= List of MicroProse games =

This is a list of games made by the American video game developer and publisher MicroProse. The games in this list were developed internally by MicroProse. Some games made by other developers were published under MicroProse's Microplay or MicroStyle label. In 1989 MicroProse acquired the British publisher Telecomsoft and subsequently published games under their Firebird and Rainbird labels. MicroProse was used as a brand name from 1998 to 2002 by Hasbro Interactive and Infogrames.

== List ==
Title	Platform	Release date	Notes
Falcon 3.0: Gold	Windows	1991	
Drop: System Breach	Windows, Nintendo Switch	2023	
Second Front	Windows	2023	
1942: The Pacific Air War	MS-DOS	1994	
1942: The Pacific Air War Scenario	MS-DOS	1995	
7th Legion	Windows	1997	
Acrojet	Commodore 64, Amstrad CPC, MSX-DOS, ZX Spectrum, PC-88, PC-98	1985	
Across the Rhine	MS-DOS	1995	
Airborne Ranger	Commodore 64, ZX Spectrum ('87) Amstrad CPC, MS-DOS ('88) Atari ST, Amiga ('89)	1987	
Addiction Pinball	Windows	1998	
The Ancient Art of War in the Skies	MS-DOS, Amiga, Atari ST	1992	
ATAC: The Secret War Against Drugs	MS-DOS	1992	Developed by Argonaut Games
Autoduel (Note: Published only in Europe)	Amiga, Apple II, Atari 8-bit, Atari ST, Commodore 64, MS-DOS, Macintosh	1985	
Avalon Hill's Diplomacy (Note: Published by Hasbro Interactive under MicroProse brand)	Windows	1999	
Avalon Hill's Squad Leader	Windows	2000	
Axis & Allies: Iron Blitz	Windows	1999	Expansion Pack
B-17 Flying Fortress	MS-DOS ('92) Amiga, Atari ST ('93)	1992	
B-17 Flying Fortress: The Mighty 8th		2000	
B.O.T.S.S.: Battle of the Solar System (Note: Copyrighted by MicroProse but published by Jaleco)	arcade	1992	
Betrayal		1990	
BloodNet	MS-DOS ('93) Amiga ('94) Windows, Mac OS X, Linux (2014)	1993	
Car Park Capital	Windows	2026	Developed by Hilkojj Interactive
Carrier Command (Note: Published by Microplay Software)	Amiga, Atari ST, MS-DOS, Amstrad CPC, ZX Spectrum, Commodore 64, Macintosh	1988	
Carrier Command 2	MacOS, Microsoft Windows	2021	
Challenge of the Five Realms	MS-DOS ('92) Linux, MacOS, Microsoft Windows (2014)	1992	
The Chaos Engine (Note: Published European SNES and Mega Drive versions)	Amiga, Atari ST, Amiga CD32, MS-DOS, RISC OS, Mega Drive, Super NES, Mobile phone, Windows, OS X, Linux	1993	
Chopper Rescue		1982	
Civilization	MS-DOS ('91) Amiga, PC-98 ('92) Atari ST, Mac, Windows 3.x ('93) SNES ('94) PlayStation ('96) Sega Saturn ('97)	1991	
Civilization II	Windows 3.x ('96) Macintosh ('97) PlayStation ('98)	1996	
Civilization II Scenarios: Conflicts in Civilization	Windows 3.x, Mac	1996	
Civilization II: Fantastic Worlds	Windows 3.x	1997	
Civilization II: Test of Time	Windows	1999	
CivNet	Windows 3.x	1995	
Colonization	MS-DOS ('94) Amiga, Mac, Windows 3.x ('95) Windows (2012) Linux (2014)	1994	
Command HQ	MS-DOS ('90) Macintosh, PC-98 ('92) Microsoft Windows, Linux (2014)	1990	
Conflict in Vietnam		1986	
Covert Action	MS-DOS ('90) Amiga ('91) Windows, Mac, Linux (2014)	1990	
Crisis in the Kremlin	MS-DOS ('91) Windows, Mac, Linux (2017)	1991	
Crusade in Europe	Apple II, Atari 8-bit, Commodore 64 ('85) Windows (2021)	1985	
CyberStrike	MS-DOS	1994	
Dark Earth	Windows	1997	
Dark Side	Amstrad CPC, Commodore 64, MS-DOS, ZX Spectrum ('88) Amiga, Atari ST ('89)	1988	
Darklands	MS-DOS ('92) Windows (2011) Mac (2013) Linux (2014)	1992	
Death by Scrolling	MacOS, Windows, Linux	2025	developed by Ron Gilbert
Decision in the Desert	Apple II, Atari 8-bit, Commodore 64 ('85) Windows (2021)	1985	
Dogfight	MS-DOS, Atari ST, Amiga	1993	
Dragonsphere	MS-DOS ('94) Windows (2011) Mac (2012) Linux (2014)	1994	
Dr. Floyd's Desktop Toys		1993	
Elite Plus	MS-DOS ('91) PC-98 ('92)	1991	
European Air War	Windows	1998	
EXFIL	Windows	2024	
F-117A Nighthawk Stealth Fighter 2.0	MS-DOS ('91) Amiga ('93) Mac, PC-98 ('94) Windows, Linux (2014)	1991	
F-117A Stealth Fighter	NES ('92) Nintendo Switch, Windows (2020)	1992	
Fleet Defender	MS-DOS ('94) PC-98 ('95) Windows, Linux (2014)	1994	
Fleet Defender: Scenario	MS-DOS	1995	
F-15 Strike Eagle	Atari 8-bit ('84) Atari ST, Commodore 64, Apple II ('85) ZX Spectrum ('86) Amstrad CPC, MSX, Thomson TO8 ('87) PC-88 ('88) PC-98 ('89)	1984	
F-15 Strike Eagle II	MS-DOS ('89) PC-98 ('90) Amiga, Atari ST, X68000 ('91) Genesis ('93)	1989	
F-15 Strike Eagle III	MS-DOS ('92) PC-98 ('95)	1992	
F-19 Stealth Fighter	MS-DOS ('88) Amiga, Atari ST ('90) PC-98 ('92) Windows, Linux (2015)	1988	
Falcon 3.0	MS-DOS	1991	
Falcon 3.0: Operation Fighting Tiger	MS-DOS	1992	
Falcon 3.0: Hornet	MS-DOS	1993	
Falcon 3.0: MiG-29	MS-DOS	1993	
Falcon 4.0	Windows, Mac OS	1998	
Fields of Glory	MS-DOS ('93) Amiga, Amiga CD32 ('94) Windows, Mac OS (2020)	1993	
Fire and Brimstone		1990	
First Contact		1990	
Flames of Freedom	Amiga, Atari ST, MS-DOS	1991	
Floyd of the Jungle	Atari 8-bit ('82) Commodore 64 ('84)	1982	
Girl Fight (Note: Released under MicroProse brand by Cybergun Group)	PlayStation 3, Xbox 360	2013	
Global Conquest	MS-DOS	1992	
GP 500	Windows	1999	
Grand Prix	Amiga, Atari ST ('91) MS-DOS ('92)	1991	
Grand Prix 2	DOS	1996	
Grand Prix 3	Windows	2000	
Grand Prix 3 Season 2000	Windows	2001	
Grand Prix 4 (Note: Published by Infogrames under MicroProse brand)	Windows	2002	
Grand Prix Manager	Windows 3.x, Windows	1995	
Grand Prix Manager 2	Windows 3.x, Windows	1996	
Grand Prix World	Windows	1999	
Ground Branch	Windows	2018	
Gunship	Atari ST, Commodore 64, Commodore 128 ('86) MS-DOS, Amstrad CPC, ZX Spectrum ('87) Amiga, MSX, PC-88 ('89) FM Towns, PC-98, X68000 ('90) Genesis ('93)	1986	
Gunship 2000	MS-DOS ('91) Amiga, PC-98 ('93), PlayStation, CD32, MS-DOS (CD-ROM Edition) ('93)	1991	
Gunship 2000: Islands & Ice	MS-DOS ('91) Amiga, PC-98 ('93) Amiga CD32, MS-DOS (CD-ROM Edition) ('93)	1992	Expansion Pack
Gunship!		2000	
Harrier Jump Jet	MS-DOS ('93) Windows (2022)	1992	aka Jump Jet
Hellcat Ace		1982	
HighFleet	Windows	2021	
Hyperspeed	MS-DOS ('91) Windows, Mac OS, Linux (2015)	1991	sequel to Lightspeed
Impossible Mission 2025	Amiga, Amiga CD32	1994	
International Soccer Challenge (Note: Published by MicroStyle)	Amiga, Atari ST, MS-DOS	1990	
Kennedy Approach	Atari 8-bit, Commodore 64 ('85) Atari ST ('88) Amiga ('89)	1985	
Knights of the Sky	MS-DOS ('90) Amiga, Atari ST ('91) PC-98 ('93) Windows, Mac OS, Linux (2016)	1990	
The Legacy: Realm of Terror	MS-DOS ('92) Windows, Mac OS, Linux (2019)	1992	
Lightspeed	MS-DOS	1990	
M1 Tank Platoon	MS-DOS ('90) Amiga, Atari ST ('90) Windows, Mac OS, Linux (2022)	1989	
M1 Tank Platoon II	Windows	1998	
Machiavelli: The Prince	MS-DOS	1993	
Magic: The Gathering	Windows	1997	
Magic: The Gathering – Desktop Themes	Windows	1995	Not a game but a high-res background pack that was published by MicroProse
Magic: The Gathering – Spells of the Ancients	Windows	1997	Expansion
Magic: The Gathering – Duels of the Planeswalkers	Windows	1998	Expansion
Majesty: The Fantasy Kingdom Sim	Windows, Mac OS (2000) Android, IOS, BlackBerry PlayBook, Nokia Symbian (2011) Windows Phone (2012)	2000	
Master of Magic	MS-DOS ('94) PC-98 ('96) PlayStation, Windows ('97) Linux (2015)	1994	
Master of Orion	MS-DOS, Mac ('93) Windows, Mac OS, Linux (2016)	1993	
Master of Orion II: Battle at Antares	MS-DOS, Windows ('96) Macintosh ('97)	1996	
MechCommander	Windows	1998	
MechCommander Gold	Windows	1999	
MechWarrior 3	Windows	1999	
MechWarrior 3: Pirate's Moon	Windows	1999	
MicroProse Golf	Amiga, Atari ST, MS-DOS	1991	
MicroProse Soccer	Amstrad CPC, Commodore 64 ('88) Amiga, Atari ST, ZX Spectrum, MS-DOS ('89) Windows, (2021)	1988	a.k.a. Keith Van Eron's Pro Soccer
Midwinter	Atari ST ('89) Amiga, MS-DOS ('90)	1989	
MiG Alley Ace	Atari 8-bit ('83) Commodore 64 ('84)	1983	
National Lampoon's Chess Maniac 5 Billion and 1		1993	
NATO Commander	Atari 8-bit ('83) Apple II, Commodore 64 ('84)	1983	
Neyyah	Windows	2025	Developed by Defy Reality Entertainment
NFL Coaches Club Football		1993	
Nightlong: Union City Conspiracy	Windows ('98) Amiga (2000)	1998	
Oriental Games		1990	
Sid Meier's Pirates!	Amstrad CPC, Commodore 64 ('87) Apple II, Apple IIGS, Mac ('88) Atari ST, PC-88, PC-98 ('89) Amiga ('90) NES ('91) MS-DOS ('94)	1987	
Pirates! Gold	MS-DOS, Genesis ('93) Amiga CD32, Mac, Windows 3.x ('94)	1993	Remake of Sid Meier's (1987) Pirates!
Pizza Tycoon (Note: Published only in North America)	Amiga, MS-DOS ('94) Windows, Mac OS, Linux (2017)	1994	
The President Is Missing	Amiga, Atari ST, Commodore 64, MS-DOS	1988	
Project Stealth Fighter	Commodore 64, ZX Spectrum	1987	
The Punisher	MS-DOS	1990	
Sid Meier's Railroad Tycoon	MS-DOS ('90) Amiga, Atari ST, Mac, PC-98 ('91) FM Towns ('93)	1990	
Sid Meier's Railroad Tycoon Deluxe	MS-DOS, PC-98	1993	
Red Storm Rising	Commodore 64 ('88) Atari ST, MS-DOS ('89) Amiga ('90) PC-98 ('91)	1988	
Regiments	Windows	2022	
Return of the Phantom	MS-DOS ('93) Windows (2020)	1993	
Rex Nebular and the Cosmic Gender Bender	MS-DOS ('92) Mac ('93) Windows, Linux (2014)	1992	
Rick Dangerous	Amiga, Amstrad CPC, Atari ST, Commodore 64, MS-DOS, ZX Spectrum ('89) Acorn Archimedes ('95) IPhone (2009)	1989	
Rick Dangerous 2	Amiga, Amstrad CPC, Atari ST, Commodore 64, MS-DOS, ZX Spectrum	1990	
Risk II	Mac, Windows	2000	
RollerCoaster Tycoon	Windows	1999	
RollerCoaster Tycoon: Corkscrew Follies	Windows	1999	Expansion Pack
RollerCoaster Tycoon: Loopy Landscapes	Windows	2000	Expansion Pack
RVF Honda		1989	
Savage	Amstrad CPC, Commodore 64, ZX Spectrum, ('88) Amiga, Atari ST, MS-DOS ('89) Microsoft Windows, Linux (2020)	1988	
Sea Rogue	MS-DOS	1992	
Sea Power: Naval Combat in the Missile Age	Steam	2024	Early access release in 2024
Sharkey's 3D Pool		1989	
Silent Service	Apple II, Atari 8-bit, Commodore 64, MS-DOS ('85) Amstrad CPC, Atari ST, ZX Spectrum ('86) Thomson MO5, Thomson TO7 ('87) Amiga, Apple IIGS, NES, PC-98 ('89) Windows, Mac OS, Linux (2014)	1985	
Silent Service II	MS-DOS ('90) Amiga, Atari ST ('91) Windows, Mac OS, Linux (2014)	1990	
Simulcra	Amiga, Atari ST	1990	
Solo Flight	Atari 8-bit ('83) Apple II ('84) Commodore 64, Thomson TO7 ('85) Thomson MO5 ('86)	1983	
Space 1889	Atari ST, MS-DOS ('90) Amiga ('91)	1990	
SpaceKids	MS-DOS	1994	
Special Forces	Amiga, Atari ST, MS-DOS	1992	
Spirit of Speed 1937 (Note: The Dreamcast port was published by Acclaim Entertainment.)	Windows	1999	
Spitfire Ace	Atari 8-bit ('82) Commodore 64 ('84)	1982	
Star Trek Generations	Windows	1997	
Star Trek: The Next Generation – A Final Unity	MS-DOS, Mac	1995	
Star Trek: The Next Generation – Birth of the Federation		1999	
Star Trek: The Next Generation – Klingon Honor Guard	Windows ('98) Mac ('99)	1998	
Starglider 2	Amiga, Atari ST ('88) MS-DOS, Mac, ZX Spectrum ('89) PC-98 ('91)	1988	
Starlord	MS-DOS ('93) Amiga ('94) Windows, Linux (2015)	1993	
Starship Troopers: Terran Ascendancy	Windows	2000	
Stunt Car Racer	Amiga, Atari ST, Commodore 64, MS-DOS, ZX Spectrum ('89) Amstrad CPC ('90)	1989	a.k.a. Stunt Track Racer
Subwar 2050	MS-DOS ('93) Amiga, Amiga CD32 ('94) Windows (2013)	1993	
Subwar 2050: The Plot Deepens	MS-DOS ('94) Windows (2013)	1994	
Super Tetris	MS-DOS, Windows 3.x ('91) Amiga, Macintosh ('92)	1991	
Sword of the Samurai	MS-DOS ('89) Windows, Mac OS, Linux (2014)	1989	
Task Force 1942	MS-DOS ('92) Windows, Mac OS, Linux (2014)	1992	WW2 Strategy and naval simulation. Simulation is just binocular sighting and turret/rail shooting.
Tactical Ops: Assault on Terror	Windows	2002	
Teamchef		1996	
This Means War!		1995	
Tinhead	Genesis ('93) SNES, Windows (2019)	1993	
Tiny Combat Arena		2022	
Tiny Football		2022	
Top Gun: Fire at Will	MS-DOS, PlayStation (console) ('96) Macintosh ('98)	1996	
Top Gun: Hornet's Nest	Windows	1998	
Track Attack	MS-DOS	1996	
Transport Tycoon	MS-DOS ('94) Macintosh ('96) PlayStation (console), Sega Saturn ('97)	1994	
Transport Tycoon Deluxe	MS-DOS, Windows	1995	
Transport Tycoon World Editor	MS-DOS	1995	
Troika	MS-DOS	1991	
Twilight: 2000	MS-DOS	1991	
Ultimate Race Pro	Windows	1998	
Ultimate Football '95		1995	
Ultimate NFL Coaches Club Football		1994	
Virtual Karts	MS-DOS	1995	
Wingman		1983	
Worms 2	Windows	1997	
Worms Armageddon	Dreamcast, Nintendo 64, PlayStation (console), Windows ('99) Game Boy Color (2000) PlayStation 4, PlayStation 5 (2022)	1999	
X-COM: Apocalypse	MS-DOS, Windows	1997	
X-COM: Email Games	Windows	1999	
X-COM: Enforcer	Windows	2001	
X-COM: Interceptor	Windows	1998	
X-COM: Terror from the Deep	MS-DOS ('95) PlayStation (console) ('96)	1995	
UFO: Enemy Unknown	Amiga, Amiga CD32, MS-DOS ('94) PlayStation (console) ('97) Windows (2007)	1994	
Xenophobe	Arcade ('87) NES ('88) Amiga, Amstrad CPC, Atari 7800, Atari ST, Commodore 64, ZX Spectrum ('89) Atari 2600, Atari Lynx ('90)	1987	
XF5700 Mantis Experimental Fighter	MS-DOS ('92) Windows (2020)	1992	
Zeppelin	Atari 8-bit ('83) Commodore 64 ('84)	1993	
Nucleares (Note: Published by MicroProse)	Windows, Linux, Mac OS X	2023	Developed by Iván Marcelo Pretti.
