= Red Baron (1981 video game) =

1981 video game

- Developer: Atari, Inc.
- Publishers: Atari, Inc.
- Platform: Arcade
- Release: May 1981
- Genre: Combat flight simulation
- Mode: Single-player

Red Baron is a combat flight simulation game developed by Atari, Inc. and released in 1981 as an arcade video game. The player takes the role of a World War I ace in a biplane fighting on the side of the Allies. The game is named after the nickname of Manfred von Richthofen, German flying ace. The game uses the same monochrome vector graphics and similar hardware as Atari's own Battlezone; the games were developed at the same time. Like Battlezone, the player is presented with a first-person view of the action. Both Battlezone and Red Baron use additional hardware to perform the mathematical computations required for simulating a 3D environment.

== Gameplay ==
The game is divided up into rounds. Most rounds are divided into air combat (shooting from one to three airplanes in formation) and ground combat (two zeppelins and multiple ground targets). While the game does not feature accurate flight physics (the plane cannot be crashed directly into the ground, for instance), the vector-rendered mountain ranges serve as solid objects and flying into or through them causes the player to crash and lose one life. The mountain ranges do not impede attacks, either from the player or the enemies, and can be shot through. Enemies include: formations of enemy biplanes, zeppelins, pillboxes, turrets, and enemy buildings.

Red Baron adjusts its own game difficulty by maintaining a consistent average game time from the last 32 games played. The NVRAM stores top three scores as well as average game times. In other words, this game has "adaptive difficulty". The goal of this feature was to adapt to the skill level of the typical player at that location and prevent excessive game times.

The upright versions of Battlezone (1980) and Red Baron share the same cabinet. In Battlezone, the player looks through a window that was shaped like a tank periscope. Side-view windows were available on both sides for people not playing the game to watch the action. Battlezone utilizes a two-way mirror to superimpose the monitor display (mounted horizontally) on a tank "interior" background. Although Red Baron uses the same cabinet as Battlezone, no mirror is used and the monitor is mounted vertically, with the player viewing the display directly.

Battlezone and Red Baron both used the same "Analog Vector Generator" (AVG) circuit boards and by switching the PROM's they could be interchanged (with very minor jumper additions). Red Baron and Battlezone use different auxiliary boards which are not interchangeable.

== Reception ==
Electronic Games magazine reported that Red Baron was not successful in arcades despite "gorgeous quadra-scan graphics and magnificent audio frills", and expressed hope that "this marvelous flight simulator with a combat theme will re-emerge in home format some day".

== Legacy ==
While playing Red Baron in 1982, Bill Stealey and Sid Meier decided to create what became MicroProse's first game, Hellcat Ace. The company later obtained the unit they had played as a memento.

Red Baron was released as part of the Atari: 80 Classic Games in One! compilation for Microsoft Windows, and later on the Xbox and PlayStation 2 in Atari Anthology. This version included parts of the cabinet art surrounding the game screen. The game is also available on Atari Greatest Hits Volume 2 for the DS. The arcade version of Red Baron is also available on the AtGames Legends Ultimate Arcade Cabinet.

== See also ==
- Red Baron (1990) and Red Baron II by Dynamix
- Knights of the Sky by MicroProse in 1990 for MS-DOS, Amiga, Atari ST
- Master of the Skies: The Red Ace (a.k.a. Hunt for the Red Baron) in 2000 by Small Rockets for Windows
- The Red Baron in popular culture - video game references
- List of games featuring von Richthofen - Mobygames
