= C.P.U. Bach =

- Developer: MicroProse
- Designers: Sid Meier and Jeff Briggs
- Platform: 3DO
- Release: 1994
- Genre: Music

C.P.U. Bach (also known as Sid Meier's C.P.U. Bach) is an interactive music-generating program designed by Sid Meier and Jeff Briggs for the 3DO. It can create Baroque music in the style of Bach for various keyboard, wind, or string instruments and in a variety of forms (e.g., concertos, fugues, minuets, chorales). The compositions are then performed by the software with synchronous 3D graphics on screen showing the virtual instruments being played.

The name of the program is a pun on the initials of one of Bach's actual sons, C.P.E. Bach, and "CPU".
