= Solo Flight (video game) =

1983 video game

- Developer: MicroProse
- Publishers: MicroProse; U.S. Gold (UK); FIL (Thomson)
- Designer: Sid Meier
- Platforms: Atari 8-bit, Apple II, Commodore 64, IBM PC, Thomson
- Release: NA: 1983; UK: 1984
- Genre: Simulation
- Mode: Single-player

Solo Flight is a third-person flight simulator written by Sid Meier for Atari 8-bit computers and published by MicroProse in 1983. It includes a game mode called Mail Pilot. This was the fourth flight simulator Meier wrote for MicroProse—following Hellcat Ace, Spitfire Ace, and Wingman—and the first which did not involve aerial combat.

In the UK, Solo Flight was published by U.S. Gold. It was ported to the Apple II, Commodore 64, and later IBM PC compatibles. A version for Thomson computers was published in 1985 by FIL in France with the title Vol Solo. A Second Edition of the game was released in 1985 with improved graphics and an instructor. A Mega Drive version was planned but never released.

== Gameplay ==
Second Edition screenshot (Atari 8-bit)

Solo Flight consists of two parts: a pure flying simulation and a game mode called Mail Pilot. The top half of the screen shows the plane being flown in third person, while the bottom portion contains instruments. The game allows flying by both visual flight rules and instrument flight rules.

In Mail Pilot, the player delivers five bags of mail to destination airports chosen from the twenty-one airports in the game. A score is given based on navigation and time. While en route, the plane may suffer mechanical and instrument failures.

== Reception ==
ANALOG Computing editor Lee Pappas wrote, "the graphics are somewhat rough, and the control panel is not up to what it should be (there is no stall indicator, and non-standard VORS)," but still concluded, "As a whole, Solo Flight is the best Atari flight simulator published to date." COMPUTE! reviewer Arthur Leyenberger praised both the simulation and game aspects of Solo Flight. InfoWorld's Essential Guide to Atari Computers recommended the game as an excellent flight simulation for the Atari 8-bit.

Roy Wagner reviewed and compared Solo Flight and Flight Simulator II for Computer Gaming World, and stated that "a very good program. The 15 pages of documentation are well written and will teach you all you need to know to taxi, takeoff, fly about, and land. It does not, however, help much in learning how to get from one specific airport to another."

Kim Nelson praised the game while reviewing it for MicroTimes. She called the flight instruments realistic and the graphics clear and easily understandable. She also described it as an excellent game for Visual flight rules and Instrument flight rules pilots, while praising the mail run game for adding a new dimension to the usual flight simulator games.
