= Sid Meier's Covert Action =

1990 video game

- Developer: MPS Labs
- Publisher: MicroProse
- Designers: Sid Meier; Bruce Shelley
- Programmer: Sid Meier
- Writer: Bruce Shelley
- Composer: Jeff Briggs
- Platforms: Amiga, MS-DOS
- Release: 1990
- Genres: Action, strategy
- Mode: Single-player

Sid Meier's Covert Action is an action and strategy video game released in 1990 by MicroProse for MS-DOSs and Amiga. The player takes the role of Max Remington (whether the male Maximillian or the female Maxine), a skilled and deadly free agent hired by the Central Intelligence Agency, and investigates criminal and terrorist plots and activities. Tommo purchased the rights to this game and digitally published it through its Retroism brand in 2015.

== Gameplay ==
The gameplay is similar to the 1987 release Pirates!, by the same developer, Sid Meier, in that the gameplay is made up of several self-directed, distinct, and unique modes of play. During the course of a game, the player will be tasked with installing wiretaps, infiltrating enemy safehouses, intercepting and decoding secret messages and interrogating prisoners. The plots are randomly generated each game, which enhances replayability.

The game is broken down into missions, with players possibly receiving promotions after each successful mission. The primary goal of each mission is to uncover details about a criminal conspiracy. Players race against the clock to discover who is involved and their roles before it's too late. When a campaign is started, there are 26 "masterminds" who initiate plots; capturing all 26 of them ends the game successfully.

Many of the pieces of data which the player needs are gathered through various mini-games. Successfully completing a mini-game often reveals one or more pieces of data, including the names and photos of those involved, as well as locations connected to the plot. The player is allowed to decide which skills his agent has mastered ahead of time, making the associated mini-games easier.

Selecting the equipment to use to infiltrate a building. On the left is shown the equipment available and on the right the floor print of the building (already explored)

The longest mini-game is combat, which involves infiltrating an enemy building. Players select their equipment, including guns, various types of grenades, and body armor. Once inside, players search desks, safes, and cabinets for clues and photograph them. Enemy agents must be avoided, slain, or knocked unconscious. If the character runs out of health, he is knocked unconscious and must either lose precious time escaping, or agree to a prisoner exchange by freeing captured enemy agents.

The driving mini-game involves either the player tailing a suspect or the player fleeing from cars to avoid a confrontation. Cars are represented by small dots on maze-like streets.

During the cryptography mini-game, players attempt to decode a scrambled message within the time limit. Players are given certain known letters to begin with, but must figure out the remaining letter mappings in a substitution cipher.

In the electronics mini-game, players attempt to either cut or connect current flowing through a set of power lines to a number of phone icons while avoiding connecting the current to alarms. By doing so, the player listens in on conversations to obtain clues and evidence. The game is played by rearranging the junctions through which power flows to produce the desired results.

== Development ==
Sid Meier was reportedly dissatisfied with the final product, because he believed that the disparate elements of the game, however good they were individually, detracted from game play. As a result, he developed what he called the "Covert Action Rule": "It's better to have one good game than two great games." He described the origins of this rule in an interview with GameSpot:

The mistake I think I made in Covert Action is actually having two games in there kind of competing with each other. There was kind of an action game where you break into a building and do all sorts of picking up clues and things like that, and then there was the story which involved a plot where you had to figure out who the mastermind was and the different roles and what cities they were in, and it was a kind of an involved mystery-type plot.

I think, individually, those each could have been good games. Together, they fought with each other. You would have this mystery that you were trying to solve, then you would be facing this action sequence, and you'd do this cool action thing, and you'd get on the building, and you'd say, "What was the mystery I was trying to solve?" Covert Action integrated a story and action poorly, because the action was actually too intense. In Pirates!, you would do a sword fight or a ship battle, and a minute or two later, you were kind of back on your way. In Covert Action, you'd spend ten minutes or so of real time in a mission, and by the time you got out of [the mission], you had no idea of what was going on in the world.

So I call it the "Covert Action Rule". Don't try to do too many games in one package. And that's actually done me a lot of good. You can look at the games I've done since Civilization, and there's always opportunities to throw in more stuff. When two units get together in Civilization and have a battle, why don't we drop out to a war game and spend ten minutes or so in duking out this battle? Well, the Covert Action Rule. Focus on what the game is.

== Reception ==
Computer Gaming World praised Covert Action for including both action and "mind-twisting brainwork", and stated that "individual cases take at least half an hour to solve, but they are addictive". The magazine criticized the poor documentation, but concluded that the game "is entertaining in the extreme", comparing it to The Fool's Errand and Starflight.

Jim Trunzo reviewed Covert Action in White Wolf #27 (June/July, 1991), rating it a 4 out of 5 and stated that "Covert Action overflows with frills that give the game its James Bond-like flavor. Case evaluations and effectiveness ratings, promotions, compiled dossiers, car chases, code breaking, and the admiration of stunning women (or handsome couriers, as the case may be) all contribute to this modern, hi-tech adventure game. Stop smugglers and extortionists, thwart kidnappings, and even uncover double-agents from within your own organization as you roleplay a super spy in Covert Action."

== See also ==
- Floor 13
- Spycraft: The Great Game
- Phantom Doctrine
