= Sea Rogue =

1992 video game

- Developer: Software Sorcery
- Publisher: Microplay
- Platform: DOS
- Release: 1992
- Genres: Simulation, Strategy

Sea Rogue is a 1992 video game published by Microplay Software.

== Gameplay ==
Sea Rogue is a game in which over 270 actual shipwrecks from the last 1000 years are available for treasure hunting. Using a six-person archeology crew, the player navigates to the coordinates of a sunken ship and sends four divers to explore the wreck. The player oversees the trawler and its crew, and their funds, and successful finds result in experience points that can be used to improve the skills of crew members and more money which allows the player to buy better ships. The advanced levels of the game involve combat with enemy divers.

== Reception ==
Reception

Review score
Publication	Score
Aktueller Software Markt	10/12

Gary Jay Levine reviewed the game for Computer Gaming World, and stated that "In the tradition of the famed Starflight series, Sea Rogue provides do-as-you-wish game play choice in its vast open-ended underwater world. Software Sorcery, in their first design effort, offers long term play value in a fascinating subject area."

T. Liam McDonald for Game Players PC Entertainment appreciated the game's open-ended design, and liked the game interface, praising the game by saying "We're talking vicarious archaeology at its best, created with a loving eye to detail and sure sense of history."
