= Sword of the Samurai (1989 video game) =

1989 video game

- Developer: MPS Labs
- Publisher: MicroProse
- Designer: Lawrence Schick
- Programmer: Jim Synoski
- Artist: Michael Haire
- Writers: Jeff Briggs; Sandy Petersen; Lawrence Schick
- Composer: Jeff Briggs
- Platform: MS-DOS
- Release: 1989
- Genres: Action, strategy
- Mode: Single-player

Sword of the Samurai is an action and strategy video game developed and published by MicroProse in 1989 for MS-DOS. It includes role-playing, strategy, and action game elements based in feudal Japan. The player begins the game as a vassal samurai where the ultimate goal is to replace Oda Nobunaga as the daimyō responsible for reunifying Sengoku Japan.

Tommo purchased the rights to this game and digitally published it through its Retroism brand in 2015. The game was re-released in 2014 on Gog.com and Steam with support for Windows, macOS, and Linux.

== Gameplay ==
The game begins by giving the player their choice of name, clan, and family specialty. Within the game, death is final and frequently risked. An early priority is establishing a family, which lets the player continue as the samurai's heir in the event of death or retirement. In the first two sections of the game, the player rises from a minor retainer to a more powerful lieutenant and then to daimyō over his entire clan. At each of these levels, the player competes to gain favor from his lord with three computer-controlled rivals who also seek to become first in favor and next in succession. Each samurai has several properties, including land holdings, army size, sword-fighting ability, and generalship. In keeping with the Bushidō theme of the game, army size and honor have the greatest influence over how the samurai are ranked.

A wide array of dishonorable actions are also possible. The player (and AI controlled characters) may kidnap and rescue family members, dishonor other samurai, or even assassinate their rivals or lord. Naturally, such behavior carries serious risk. The samurai performs these acts personally and risks capture or death. At minimum, exposure entails loss of honor and land and more serious offenses require ritual suicide (seppuku). A failed attempt on the life of the samurai's lord results in the extermination of his entire family, losing the game.

After becoming a daimyō, the game shifts to a wargame format, with the goal of conquering enough provinces to claim the title of shōgun. The player no longer wanders personally through a provincial map, but instead directs an army across the three lower Japanese islands. The player is able to direct his underlings to deal with any sword fight or melee minigames without loss of honor: the focus is on the size of the player's army and mastery of the battlefield tactics.

After winning the game, the player is given a final summary of the future of his dynasty. Depending on various factors such as the victor's honor and the presence of an adult heir, the length of the dynasty could range from hundreds of years (like the Tokugawa shogunate) to a quick dissolution after the shōgun's death (as occurred with Oda Nobunaga and Toyotomi Hideyoshi).

== Development ==
MicroProse designers Sid Arnold and Lawrence Schick began development of Sword of the Samurai in late 1987, after the success of the company's first role-playing adventure game Sid Meier's Pirates!. They chose to set it during the Sengoku period because the era's chaos made it possible for samurai to gain great power regardless of background, and gave players the goal of uniting the country and becoming shōgun. MicroProse co-owner Sid Meier helped develop the NPCs' artificial intelligence and the dueling.

== Reception ==
In the February–March 1990 issue of Games International, Brian Walker was disappointed in this game, commenting that although the outside of the box had promised "'a role-playing action-adventure simulation' [...] it is none of these things." Although he found combat quite easy and even fun, it failed to advance in challenge as he worked his way through the game. He wrote of the arcade-style combats, "they soon pale as you continuously fight the same opponents in the same locations." He did like the graphics, which he called "superb and offer a real flavour of Japan". He also called the system for fighting strategic army battles "the most innovative parts of the game", and he enjoyed the beautifully detailed glossy manual. However, the "less than cerebral arcade sequences" led Walker to give the game a poor rating of 5 out of 10, although he did give the graphics an excellent rating of 9 out of 10.

Jim Trunzo reviewed Sword of the Samurai for White Wolf #20, rating it 4 out of 5 overall, and stated that "Sword of the Samurai is one of the most complete programs designed. Virtually all aspects of the period of the genre are covered. The storyline is complete and effectively mixes warfare, domestic concerns, and political matters."

In 1990, Computer Gaming World stated that Sword of the Samurai "offers even more than its spiritual ancestor, Pirates!". It praised the graphics, soundtrack, and many choices during gameplay. Later that year and in 1993, the magazine gave it four stars out of five, saying the game did not sell as well as Pirates! despite "near perfect" gameplay and historical accuracy.
