= F-117A Nighthawk Stealth Fighter 2.0 =

1991 video game

- Developers: MPS Labs; Retroism (PC)
- Publishers: MicroProse; Nightdive Studios (PC)
- Designer: Jeff Briggs
- Programmers: Ed Fletcher; Joe Hellesen; Andy Hollis
- Composer: Jeff Briggs (PC)
- Platforms: Amiga, MS-DOS, Mac OS, PC-98
- Release: 1991: MS-DOS; NA: 1991 Amiga; NA: 1993; EU: 1993 Mac OS; NA: 1994
- Genre: Flight simulator
- Mode: Single-player

F-117A Nighthawk Stealth Fighter 2.0 is the 1991 remake of the 1988-1990 Cold War combat flight simulator video game F-19 Stealth Fighter by MicroProse, itself a remake of 1987's Project Stealth Fighter. The original PC version was updated with a corrected aircraft model once the Lockheed F-117 Nighthawk was declassified and with 256-color VGA graphics instead of the original's 16-color EGA, among other changes.

== Gameplay ==
A day mission (MCGA/VGA mode).

The F-19 of the original game, which was published before the real fighter's specifications became public, carries weapons in four weapons bays. Given that the real stealth fighter's payload capacity falls short of that offered in F-19, the sequel gives players the choice of aircraft: a "realistic" model carrying weapons in only two payload bays, or a variant retaining the four bays of the plane of the first game. In the PC version, both models of fighter resemble the F-117.

The new game introduces new theatres of warfare, such as Cuba and Operation Desert Storm (in the wake of the Persian Gulf War, the Iraqis are no longer the allied nation that they had been in the previous game). Missions typically encompass both primary and secondary targets, selected from a variety of objectives from photographing facilities (one selected weapon would have to be a high resolution camera) to bombing various ground targets. An advanced flight plan editing routine allows it to adjust waypoints to successfully skirt pulse and Doppler ground radar sites; the default flight plan will often take the plane's track into areas where it can be detected. Missions start on the runway of the originating base and end with the pilot successfully landing at the recovery base. A "time compression" feature allows the player to speed up the clock during missions.

An improved 3D object rendering system, and 256-color graphics, provide improved target viewing on a remote camera view in the cockpit. Likewise, the player can change viewing angles around the plane, outside the plane, and even reverse target view to see the aircraft passing overhead from the position of the target. This last can also be performed from the vantage point of patrolling enemy fighters.

The game's missions have the player flying at a low altitude, though the actual F-117 mission profile involved launching weapons from high altitude. In keeping with the "stealth" nature of the game, most missions are during nighttime, though a cheat command allows the player to switch the mission to daytime.

Points per mission are awarded for success or failure, as well as radar and visual detection, and identification by enemy installations and aircraft. High scores are naturally awarded for entering enemy airspace, accomplishing the primary and secondary mission objectives, and departing, all without being detected by the enemy. The game's manual includes in-depth discussion of types of radar detection and how to avoid it, called "threading the needle".

== Release ==
Originally released for IBM PC compatibles in 1991, version were released for the Amiga, Mac and PC-98 in 1993–1994. Its 3D engine was also optimised and used to create the graphics for Task Force 1942: Surface Naval Action in the Pacific in 1992.

Tommo purchased the rights to this game and digitally publishes it through its Retroism brand in 2015. In October 2014, the game was released on Steam, developed by Retroism and published by Nightdive Studios.

== Reception ==
Computer Gaming World in 1991 called F-117A as engrossing, challenging and educational simulation game. A 1992 survey in the magazine of wargames with modern settings gave the game four stars out of five, and a 1994 survey gave it three-plus stars. The game received the rating of 93% by Computer and Video Games, and scored 92% from Amiga Format. Most of other reviews were less enthusiastic, but usually with the ratings still over 80%.
