= Pirates! Gold =

1993 video game

- North American home computer cover art
- Developer: MPS Labs
- Publisher: MicroProse
- Designer: Paul Murphy
- Programmer: Randall Don Masteller
- Artist: Michael Haire
- Composers: Jeffery L. Briggs; Roland J. Rizzo
- Platforms: MS-DOS, Genesis, Classic Mac OS, Windows 3.x, CD32
- Release: 1993: MS-DOS, Genesis; 1994: Mac, Win 3.1, CD32
- Genres: Action-adventure, strategy
- Mode: Single-player

Pirates! Gold is a 1993 remake of the 1987 Sid Meier's Pirates! video game published by MicroProse.

== Development ==
MicroProse developed this 256-color version for MS-DOS, Macintosh, Sega Genesis, Amiga CD32 and Windows 3.x featuring a MIDI score and mouse support (in MS-DOS and Windows versions).

== Gameplay ==
Pirates! Gold features Super VGA graphics including hand-painted screens, and a more-detailed playing environment than the original. The update also includes 3-D modeled ship and flag animations, and graphic depictions of items that were menu choices in the original game.

The player can play as a pirate, privateer, or a pirate hunter. It features sword fighting, ocean-faring battles, and land battles as its three main arenas of action, connected by role-playing which allows the player to court the favor of local politicos, romance women, and recruit pirates in the local pub. Players have the opportunity to go on quests, but must also strategically plan raiding excursions and trading routes.

The PC versions contain a copy protection scheme requiring the player to identify the flag of a pirate ship sighted on the horizon (similar to the 1987 Commodore 64 port). Sea and sea-to-land combat are played in real-time while land battles are done in turn-based strategy. Sun sighting is not present in this version, and there are no special items. The game does, however, include several new features.

== Reception ==
Paul C. Schuytema for Compute! was positive to the game and called it "addicting".

In 1993, Computer Gaming World described Pirates! Gold as adding "three disks of graphical gold" to "a great game engine". The magazine stated that the game "has much to offer a new player and comes with the highest of recommendations", but warned those familiar with the original that it was "not a significantly revised game with fresh game play".

James Trunzo reviewed Pirates! Gold in White Wolf #39 (1994), giving it a final evaluation of "Excellent" and stated that "Pirates! Gold does have built-in replay value thanks to the option of playing in one of six historical periods or historical expeditions. By combining your initial choices with the ones that come up during play, you will have enough variety to keep Pirates! Gold on your hard drive for months."

In 1994, PC Gamer US named Pirates! Gold the 39th best computer game ever. The editors wrote: "We're recommending the new version of this old classic, because it looks so darn good and it'll be easier for most of you to get your hands on. But the award really goes out to the gameplay that made the original Pirates! great". In 2018, Complex ranked Pirates! Gold 26th among "The 100 Best Sega Genesis Games".

According to Microprose, Pirates! Gold sold in excess of 450,000 copies by September 1997.

== Reviews ==
- Mega #15 (December 1993)
- The One #65
- Amiga Computing #71 (Mar 1994)
- PC Joker (German)
- Power Play (German)
- Micro Mania (Spanish)
- Tilt (French)
- Gambler (Polish)
- PC Games (German)
- Megazin (Slovenian)
- Pelit (Finnish)
- PC Player (German)
- Amiga Joker (German)

== See also ==
- Sid Meier's Pirates! (1987)
- Sid Meier's Pirates! (2004)
