= Ultimate NFL Coaches Club Football =

1994 video game

- Developer: MicroProse
- Publisher: MicroProse
- Platform: DOS
- Release: August 1994
- Genre: Sports

Ultimate NFL Coaches Club Football is a 1994 sports video game from MicroProse. The game is licensed by the NFL Players Association.

== Gameplay ==
In Ultimate NFL Coaches Club Football, players are given a dual-layered experience that blends NFL simulation with fantasy football management. The gameplay unfolds in two primary modes:

- NFL Simulation Mode: Players take control of authentic 1994 NFL teams in a 3D-rendered environment featuring texture-mapped stadiums, detailed player sprites, and enhanced sound design. The simulation includes realistic gameplay elements such as drafting, trading, injuries, and player aging across "career leagues." This mode emphasizes action-oriented football, allowing fans to relive and reshape the NFL season with real-world stats downloaded from Prodigy or Fantasy Sports Properties.
- Fantasy Football Management Mode: This mode empowers users to set up and run their own leagues using the Franchise Football League system. It includes the full 1994 NFL rosters, customizable scoring systems, and over 40 predefined statistical categories—with the option to create 50 more. Commissioners can even reset the season to test scoring setups before kickoff. The game integrates Dick Giebel's Fantasy Football Journal, adding depth and strategy.

== Reception ==
Reception

Review scores
| Publication | Score |
|---|---|
| Aktueller Software Markt | 8/12 |
| PC Gamer | 83% |

Chicago Tribune said "Nonetheless, it's fitting that UItimate Football is endorsed by Marv Levy, whose Buffalo Bills have lost four Super Bowls in a row, because Ultimate Football, like the Bills, tries hard but comes up just short".
