= Civilization World =

- Developer: Firaxis Games
- Publisher: 2K
- Designer: Sid Meier
- Series: Civilization
- Platform: Facebook Platform
- Release: July 6, 2011 (open beta)
- Genre: Strategy

Civilization World was a massively multiplayer online Flash game in the Civilization game series, developed by Sid Meier and Firaxis Games. It was launched on July 6, 2011 on Facebook with the original name Civilization Network; the game title was changed to Civilization World on January 6, 2012. On February 28, 2013, it was announced that the game would be discontinued and was shut down on May 29, 2013.

== Gameplay ==
Civilization World contained many gameplay elements featured in previous Civilization installments such as building houses, farming lands, researching science, collecting gold and expanding communities over several eras. The goal of each game was to reach the end with the most fame points which could be achieved by completing achievements, discovering new technologies, completing era victory conditions or building a wonder of the world.

Unlike previous installments in the series, the game featured real-time strategy rather than the turn-based strategy the series is known for. When in combat with another nation, the player was able to choose from ranged, melee, mobile and naval units. The battle field had limited slots for each unit which allowed the player to prioritize and strategically pick and choose unit placements. Mini-games had also been included to add more variety to the game.

Civilization World featured online compatibility and had a heavy emphasis on multiplayer which allowed player-to-player interaction. Players were allowed to play single-player or multiplayer matches allowing several players to work together and compete against others to achieve victory. Multiplayer allowed players to form independent nations and battle other competing nations, a feature not present in previous installments. Nations were structured by hierarchy, the highest being the king while other ranks include princes, dukes and other nobles. To be crowned king and become the leader of a nation, the player had to complete a series of objectives and achieve medals. Ranking was relative to all other players within the nation, meaning each player within a nation competed against each other to become king.

== Development ==
According to an early (October 2009) announcement from Sid Meier, Civilization World was intended to offer "everything you enjoy in Civ in a fully persistent environment—you can play as much as you like, whenever you like, and it'll be free to play." From May to September 2010, the official 2K Games team offered no updates regarding Civilization World, causing many followers to believe the entire project had been scrapped (or indeed, never existed in the first place). In August, 2K Games' Community Manager "2K Greg" announced that Civilization World was, however, still very much alive. In November 2010, Take-Two's soon-to-be CEO (then the company's Executive Chairman) Strauss Zelnick confirmed once again that Civilization World was still in production, with the planned release date set for sometime in 2011.

== Release ==
On July 6, 2011, Civilization World entered open beta and was made available to the public. On February 28, 2013, it was announced that the last day of play for CivWorld would be May 29, 2013. The game servers crashed about 6 minutes after the announced time.
