= Floyd of the Jungle =

1982 video game

- Developer: MicroProse
- Publisher: MicroProse
- Designer: Sid Meier
- Platforms: Atari 8-bit, Commodore 64
- Release: 1982: Atari 8-bit 1983: v2 for Atari, C64
- Genre: Platform
- Modes: Single-player, 2-4 player multiplayer

Floyd of the Jungle is a platform game for Atari 8-bit computers released in 1982 as part of the initial batch of games from MicroProse. Designed and programmed by company co-founder Sid Meier, it is one of the few 2D action games he created and the only platform game. It allows up to four players at once.

The 1982 release is written in Atari BASIC. A second version, published in 1983, is programmed in assembly language for improved performance, and the computer controls any unused players. Version 2 was available for both Atari 8-bit computers and Commodore 64.

== Gameplay ==
The third level of version 2 of the game (Atari 8-bit)

The player can make Floyd run left and right with the joystick, leap by pressing the joystick button, and punch by keeping the button held after landing from a leap. Vines can be climbed up and down to move between platforms.

Some actions give points: collecting a bird (1 point), punching a pygmy (2 points), and reaching "Janice" at the top of the screen (4 points). In a multiplayer game, the first player to reach a predetermined point value wins. Single-player games have a time limit instead. Other hazards, such as alligators, can hurt Floyd, sending him to the bottom of the screen.

== Development ==
When asked in 1983 where the Floyd of the Jungle concept came from, Meier responded:

I had just finished Hellcat Ace and I was looking around for ideas for a new game and there was this movie on T.V., the lastest [sic] Tarzan movie with Bo Derek, and I was also working at the time with some animation tools that I'd been developing, animation effects with multiple characters and multiple player/missile images, and the two just merged together.

The name, according to Meier, was based on the cartoon series George_of_the_Jungle that he had watched as a kid.

== Reception ==
Computer Gaming World wrote:

In view of the many superbly-crafted games of this genre on the market today, FJ finds itself up against some pretty outstanding company. In my opinion, he comes up short. However, FJ is less expensive than much of its competition, and may therefore be an acceptable choice for some gamers.

In a 1984 review of the game's second release, Creative Computing concluded: "If you are really into the Donkey Kong type of games, and want every variation for your library, then you will want Floyd of the Jungle. But we think that there are others on the market that offer better playability and more fun." Antic liked the animation and 4 player capability, but found the penalty for running into obstacles to be harsh for new players.

Reviewing the C64 version for Electronic Games, Ted Salamone wrote, "it doesn't have any great moments. It doesn't even have any good ones!" He called out the visuals as "so substandard that they are an insult, display an incredible lack of detail and imagination," and also that "poorly executed collision detection routines result in many an untimely death."
