= SpaceKids =

1994 video game

- German edition boxart
- Developer(s): Evryware Software
- Publisher(s): MicroProse
- Platform(s): MS-DOS
- Release: 1994
- Genre(s): Education

SpaceKids is a video game developed by Evryware Software and published by MicroProse in 1994 for MS-DOS.

== Gameplay ==
SpaceKids plays like a collection of minigames, similar to the WarioWare series, though minigames have no time limit. Depending on the actions taken in-game, the player can discover multiple branching paths leading to different endings. For example, in one early minigame, the main characters slide down their spaceship's runway, and can either land safely at the bottom or fall off, landing in a bag carried by a pirate. The top right corner of the screen shows which of the arrow keys can be pressed to interact with the game, as well as whether the player needs to clear an interactive sequence in order to proceed.

== Plot ==
SpaceKids is an entertainment and educational game for children. In this interactive cartoon, Zeedle and Deet are Kids who travel to Earth in a living UFO to find their famous missing grandfather, a space explorer who has traveled to Earth without them. Early on, their ship, Saucer, flies past an elephant named Elmo and his friend, a bug named Buzz, before landing. Various characters that can be encountered during the game's branching plots include Balboa, a pirate who hates music, Grunges, monsters who live under a bed in the house the two have landed in, and Spike, a cat whose favorite toys are pencils. No matter what happens, the ending will always be a "happy" one, according to the website; the Kids find their Grandpa and travel back to the Moon.

== Reception ==
The game was reviewed in 1995 in Dragon #215 by Jay & Dee in the "Eye of the Monitor" column. Jay gave the game 2 1/2 out of 5 stars, while Dee gave the game 4 stars. DosGames.com gave it 3 1/2 out of 5 stars, calling its production values "generally good".

== Reviews ==
- Computer Game Review and CD-ROM Entertainment
