= Decision in the Desert =

1985 strategy video game

- Publisher(s): MicroProse
- Designer(s): Sid Meier; Ed Bever
- Platform(s): Apple II, Atari 8-bit, Commodore 64, IBM PC
- Release: 1985
- Genre(s): Strategy

Decision in the Desert is a computer wargame designed by Sid Meier and Ed Bever and published by MicroProse in 1985. Versions were released for the Apple II, Atari 8-bit computers, Commodore 64, and IBM PC compatibles (as a self-booting disk).

== Gameplay ==
Decision in the Desert is a game in which five battles are depicted: Sidi Barrani, Crusader, Gazala, First Alamein and Alam Halfa.

== Reception ==
M. Evan Brooks reviewed the game for Computer Gaming World, and stated that "While DITD lacks a campaign scenario, the scale offers a reasonable explanation."
