= F-117A Stealth Fighter =

1992 video game

- Developer(s): MicroProse; Empty Clip Studios (re-release)
- Publisher(s): MicroProse; Retroism (re-release)
- Designer(s): B. C. Milligan; James G. Thomas
- Composer(s): Ken Lagace
- Platform(s): NES
- Release: NA: December 1992
- Genre(s): Combat flight simulator
- Mode(s): Single-player

F-117A Stealth Fighter is combat flight simulator for the Nintendo Entertainment System where the player fights enemy aircraft and destroy ground targets.

== Gameplay ==
The player takes control of a stealth fighter aircraft, and is required to pilot the craft on a series of missions to destroy ground targets. The equipment of the player's craft can be customized, with different missile and bombs available for different combat roles.

Early levels of this game are based on actual conflicts, such as the 1986 United States bombing of Libya, the Gulf War, and the United States Invasion of Panama. Later missions involve theoretical conflicts in Korea and the Soviet Union, and move on to science-fiction events involving secret missions and UFOs.
