= Hellcat Ace =

1982 video game

- Original Atari box cover
- Developer(s): MicroProse
- Publisher(s): MicroProse
- Designer(s): Sid Meier
- Programmer(s): Atari; Sid Meier; C64; Ron Verovsky; Dale Gray; IBM PC; R. Donald Awalt
- Platform(s): Atari 8-bit, Commodore 64, IBM PC
- Release: 1982: Atari; 1983: C64; 1984: IBM PC
- Genre(s): Combat flight simulator
- Mode(s): Single-player

Hellcat Ace is a 1982 combat flight simulator video game written by Sid Meier for Atari 8-bit computers and published by MicroProse as their first program. The game was an immediate hit and led Meier to write several new releases for the Atari home computers. Ports of Hellcat Ace were released for the Commodore 64 in 1983 and IBM PC compatibles in 1984.

== Gameplay ==
The player flies the Grumman F6F Hellcat in a series of missions. The initial screen allows the user to select a mission from 1 to 10, each with increasing difficulty. An additional four missions are listed but cannot be selected directly in the original version. When a mission is successfully completed, the game moves onto the next mission.

On entering a mission the player is inside the Hellcat flying over the Pacific Ocean. They normally start at 10,000 feet altitude, flying north at 200 mph. In the first mission, Flying Tiger, the task is to shoot down a Japanese bomber which is placed directly in front of the player at the same altitude and thus easily shot down with a single burst from the guns. In the second mission, Pearl Harbor, the bomber is replaced by a somewhat tougher float plane, and so forth.

== Development and release ==
Sid Meier purchased an Atari 800 computer in 1980 and began writing games in Atari BASIC. He showed his first work, Hostage Rescue, to his parents; his mother became so engrossed that she had to force herself to drop the joystick and walk away.

In 1982, Meier was working for General Instrument in Baltimore. Mutual friends knew of Meier's interest in flight simulators and introduced him to Bill Stealey, a former military pilot who then worked in strategic planning at the company. The two met in Las Vegas in the summer of 1982 while at meetings, and found Red Baron in the arcade at the MGM Grand. Meier repeatedly beat Stealey at the game, as Meier was able to consistently predict the game's next moves.

Meier claimed he could write a better game than Red Baron on his home computer in one week; Stealey replied that he would sell it if Meier could write it. Despite Meier's initial one-week estimate, Hellcat Ace took two months to complete. Stealey sold fifty copies at his first sales meeting, and MicroProse was formed to sell the game. In a 1996 interview, Stealey recalled posing as a customer and calling computer stores to ask if they carried Hellcat Ace; he would then later call the stores as himself, and sell the game to them. He stated, "All these guys ended up being my regular customers. They all knew the scam I pulled on them and they all said, 'Bill, it was a great game.' And they sold a ton."

Hellcat Ace was a success and led to several new games in quick succession; Spitfire Ace was a modified Hellcat Ace released the same year, 1983's NATO Commander was a classic wargame, and 1984's F-15 Strike Eagle returned to the flight simulation side and was a hit, eventually selling more than 1 million copies.

Many years later, the original MGM Grand Red Baron machine was tracked down with the help of Bally Midway executives, and installed in the MicroProse offices.

== Reception ==
Antic reviewed the game in May 1983, summing it up by saying "While the graphics are not stunning, the game plays well and holds your interest with multiple skill levels and a variety of scenarios." The reviewer praised the overall simulation, noting that "Fancy aerobatics are easily done; loops, barrel rolls, split 'S' and Immelman turns are all possible". It concludes by saying the only obvious improvement would be better graphical effects, but that this did not detract from the playability, recommending it to anyone with an interest in flight simulators.

Page 6 also reviewed the game in May 1983. Mirroring the Antic review, the magazine said "The graphics are simple but the overall effect is quite stunning... This is a great simulation giving a real feel of action." Softline reviewed both Hellcat Ace and Spitfire Ace in their January 1984 issue, saying "The games' graphics are extremely simple" but otherwise gives it a positive review, stating that "While Commodore 64 and Atari owners still don't have access to anything as sophisticated as the Flight Simulator, they now have Hellcat Ace and Spitfire Ace, programs that could produce some vertigo in people with a lot of imagination." InfoWorld's Essential Guide to Atari Computers recommended the game as an excellent flight simulation for the Atari 8-bit.

== Reviews ==
- Fire & Movement #76
