= Jeff Briggs =

American video game developer (born 1957)

Jeffery L. Briggs
- Born: March 10, 1957 (age 69); Florence, Alabama, U.S.
- Occupations: Video game composer, designer
- Known for: Civilization series

Jeffery L. Briggs (born March 10, 1957) is the American founder and former president and CEO of Firaxis Games, a video game developer based in Hunt Valley, Maryland, United States. He was previously a game designer at MicroProse but left that company in 1996 along with Sid Meier and Brian Reynolds to form Firaxis Games.

== Career ==
Briggs holds a doctorate in musical composition and theory from the University of Illinois. Briggs' composition teachers included Samuel Adler, Warren Benson, Joseph Schwantner, Donald Freund, and John Melby. His career began in New York City where he composed music for various events, including dance and theater groups. He took a job as game editor and designer at West End Games where he worked until 1987. He then joined MicroProse Software, where he served as designer, writer, composer and producer, becoming the company's Executive Producer and, finally, its Director of Product Development.

Briggs's music first appeared in a 1989 MicroProse release Sword of the Samurai. Following that, most MicroProse games featured his work. Before working in software entertainment, Briggs' music had already received performances by ensembles internationally in Paris' Pompidou Centre ("Ecliptic"), New York City's Avery Fisher Hall ("Comets"), and in the Krannert Center for the Performing Arts in Illinois ("Adjectives," "Firaxis", "Chimera," "Aurora," and others) as well as various smaller venues in New York and other cities throughout the United States. In 1996, he was awarded US Patent 5,496,962 for a "System for Real-Time Music Composition and Synthesis" used in a product called "CPU Bach".

Briggs left MicroProse in 1996 to co-found Firaxis Games. In a 2004 interview he commented his decision: "Civ II had just come out and MicroProse had been purchased by Spectrum HoloByte. [...] Things had gotten pretty bad. By that time I was director of product development and they were asking me to do things and tell people things that I just didn't like. I decided that I could do a lot better job running the company than they could, so I left." Briggs then led the design of Civilization III and oversaw the expansion of the company into a major developer of strategy computer games. He also co-designed Colonization and Civilization II, as well as composing much of the original music in Civilization IV. He negotiated the acquisition of Firaxis Games by Take Two Interactive in 2005, became its chairman in spring of 2006, and left Firaxis in November of that year.

In 2009, the Westfield Symphony Orchestra presented the world premiere of his composition "Celebration for Orchestra".

=== Games ===
Name	Year	Credited with	Publisher
Sword of the Samurai	1989	composer, writer	MicroProse
Silent Service II	1990	composer	MicroProse
Railroad Tycoon	1990	composer	MicroProse
Covert Action	1990	composer	MicroProse
Lightspeed	1990	composer	MicroProse
Knights of the Sky	1990	designer	MicroProse
Civilization	1991	composer, writer	MicroProse
Hyperspeed	1991	composer	MicroProse
Gunship 2000	1991	composer	MicroProse
F-117A Nighthawk Stealth Fighter 2.0	1991	designer, composer	MicroProse
Task Force 1942	1992	composer	MicroProse
Rex Nebular and the Cosmic Gender Bender	1992	composer	MicroProse
F-15 Strike Eagle III	1992	composer	MicroProse
Darklands	1992	composer	MicroProse
Command HQ (Macintosh)	1992	composer	MicroProse
The Ancient Art of War in the Skies	1992	composer	MicroProse
Super Strike Eagle	1993	composer	MicroProse
Railroad Tycoon Deluxe	1993	composer	MicroProse
Pirates! Gold	1993	composer	MicroProse
Colonization	1994	designer, composer	MicroProse
Civilization II	1996	producer, designer, composer	MicroProse
Gettysburg!	1997	designer, programmer	Electronic Arts
Alpha Centauri	1999	composer, executive producer	Electronic Arts
Alien Crossfire	1999	composer, executive producer	Electronic Arts
Antietam!	1999	designer	Firaxis Games
Civilization III	2001	designer	Infogrames
Civilization III: Conquests	2003	designer	Atari SA
Pirates!	2004	designer	Atari SA
Civilization IV	2005	composer	2K Games
Civilization IV: Warlords	2006	composer	2K Games

== Awards ==
In 2011, Jeffery Briggs was awarded the 2011 International Music Prize for Excellence in Composition by the National Academy of Music for two pace-setting works: Celebration - for Orchestra and 3rd String Quartet. In 2003, Briggs was named software "Entrepreneur of the Year" by Ernst & Young, and in 2004 he was named "CEO of the Year" by Baltimore SmartCEO magazine.

He was awarded the Bernard and Rose Sernoffsky and Louis Lane Prizes for Music Composition at the Eastman School of Music (1978, 1979), the Haimsohm Prize for Musical Composition at the University of Memphis (1980),the ASCAP Award for Young Composers (1984), and a MacDowell Colony Fellowship (1986).
