= Sid Meier's Pirates! =

1987 video game

- IBM PC box art
- Developer: MicroProse (Note: NES version developed by Rare.)
- Publishers: MicroProse; NES; NA: Ultra Games; PAL: Palcom Software
- Designer: Sid Meier
- Artist: Michael Haire
- Composers: Ken Lagace; NES; David Wise
- Platform: Commodore 64: Amstrad CPC, Apple II, Apple IIGS, Macintosh, IBM PC, PC-98, PC-88, Atari ST, Amiga, NES
- Release: May 1987: C64; EU: May 1987; NA: June 1987 CPC; EU: 1987 Apple II; NA: January 1988 Apple IIGS; NA: August 1988 Macintosh; NA: December 1988 IBM PC; 1988 PC-98; JP: February 10, 1989 PC-88; JP: July 1989 Atari ST; EU: October 1989; NA: November 1989 Amiga; NA: June 1990 NES; NA: October 1991; PAL: 1991
- Genres: Action-adventure, strategy
- Mode: Single-player

Sid Meier's Pirates! is a 1987 action-adventure strategy video game developed and published by MicroProse for the Commodore 64. It was designed by Sid Meier, and was the first game to include his name in its title as an effort by MicroProse to attract fans of Meier's earlier games, most of which were combat vehicle simulation games. The game was later ported to several other platforms, including the Amstrad CPC, Apple II, Macintosh, IBM PC, Atari ST, Amiga and Nintendo Entertainment System.

Set in the Caribbean, the game is a simulation of the life of a pirate, a privateer, or a pirate hunter in the 16th, 17th and 18th centuries. The Pirates! playing field includes the Spanish Main (namely the northern coast of South America), Central America and the Yucatán Peninsula, the entire Gulf of Mexico, Florida, and all Caribbean islands, plus Bermuda in the PC version. The player is free to sail to any part of the above-mentioned lands, stopped by an invisible barrier southeast of Trinidad, all the way north to just northeast of Bermuda.

The Pirates! Gold remake, with minor improvements and better graphics, was released in 1993. An enhanced remake, also named Sid Meier's Pirates!, was released in 2004. Versions for mobile devices have also been released.

== Gameplay ==
Pirates! is a single-player, open-world game. The player receives a letter of marque authorizing service as a privateer for the Spanish Empire, the Dutch Republic, the Kingdom of England, or the French colonial empire in the Caribbean. The player's loyalties may change over the course of the game; they may also hold rank with multiple countries and may turn to piracy at any time. Gameplay is open-ended; the player may choose to attack enemy ships or towns, hunt pirates, seek buried treasure, rescue long-lost family members, or even avoid violence altogether and seek to increase their wealth through trade. The game also has no predetermined end, although as time goes on, it becomes more difficult to recruit crew members. As the player character ages, fighting becomes more difficult, and deteriorating health will eventually force the character into retirement. The game ends when the player retires, at which point they are given a position in their future life, from beggar to King's advisor, based on accumulated wealth, land, rank, marital status, and other accomplishments.

The era of play is one of the choices given to a player at game-start. Different eras provide a different challenge, as political and economic power shifts between the four fledgling European empires. Choosing 1560 (the earliest choice) as the starting year places the player in the Caribbean almost devoid of influence but that of Spain, while 1680 (the latest choice) provides a mature Caribbean with many non-Spanish colonies and an overall higher degree of activity in the region. The other choices include 1600, 1620, 1640, and 1660, with the progressive effect of reducing Spanish dominance in favor of the other nations, while increasing seafaring traffic. Ship designs are also era-dependent, with some types of ships appearing more frequently in certain eras and less in others, and certain ship types being used near-exclusively by certain nations.

In the Mac version, graphics like terrain are painted with special glyphs.

The game tests a wide range of skills: hand-eye coordination during the fencing sections, tactical ability during the land and sea combat phases, and strategic thinking, for everything from choosing a wife to deciding when to divide up the plunder. Moreover, each game is likely to take a different course, as most events in the game are random, including the economic and political systems, and early in the game, these can greatly affect future strategic options. In the course of the game a player may try to tack in a frigate in order to run down a smaller and faster pinnace, but must be fortunate enough to have the weather gage.

One of the most innovative features of Pirates! is the introduction of a dynamic playing field. In Pirates! many of the most important factors which affect player decisions are randomized at the beginning of the game and continue to shift during gameplay. This not only creates a new experience each time the game is played, but also requires the player to remain flexible, and be ready to exploit possibilities when they occur. Changes happen whenever time passes and they are unrelated to player actions. In fact, in this game in the series, random events do not have any graphical representation, and the player can do nothing to prevent them.

The most important random factor in the game lies in the diplomatic relations between the four nations laying claim to the Caribbean. Relations may differ greatly from game to game, and can shift in an instant, creating and removing opportunities, possibly even for long periods of time. The player generally benefits from periods of war between two or more countries, because any aggression towards a country's ships or cities, which occurs often if not specifically avoided, will gain recognition with its enemies, prompting them to bestow the player with land, titles, and other benefits. During peacetime, the player can only benefit from the capture of pirates on the high seas, which is seen as favorable by all nations, but is a rare occurrence.

Cities are also dynamic, with statistics like wealth and population fluctuating constantly. The player can access any city's statistics. Knowing the statistics of a city helps the player plan ahead, especially with regards to trading or any desire to raid or conquer cities.

The original versions of Pirates! sported both disk and manual copy protections. Users were asked the time at which various treasure ships were arriving at the port. If the time was wrong, the game would continue, but at a much higher difficulty level that would frustrate most people.

== Development ==
In early 1986, Meier and fellow MicroProse designer Arnold Hendrick wanted to create a role-playing adventure game, but Meier's business partner Bill Stealey was skeptical of producing non-vehicle simulations. With five successful years behind him, Microprose considered star designer Sid Meier a selling point and chose to put his name on the box of his next game, despite a shift away from combat simulators he had become known for. According to Stealey, the idea to add Meier's name came after meeting Robin Williams: "We were at dinner at a Software Publishers Association meeting, and Robin Williams was there. And he kept us in stitches for two hours. And he turns to me and says 'Bill, you should put Sid's name on a couple of these boxes, and promote him as the star'".

Meier in his interview said that "Pirates! was actually inspired by a technological trick" when "one of our programmers came up with a cool trick where we could create images, pieces of art, by packing them into a font. And that allowed us to very quickly bring in new pictures". The game is mostly written in Commodore BASIC. Comments in the source code indicate that Meier originally intended to call it Pirates of the Spanish Main!!.

Meier admits that Pirates! was not intended to provide an authentic, true-to-life recreation of historical piracy: "Pirates! was designed more around your fantasy of pirates than the actual reality. That allowed you to bring in all the stuff from the movies, whatever you had read, whatever was in your imagination". MicroProse planned several game elements removed before release, including multiple NPCs per town, more detailed sailing including fleet actions, and a subplot involving religion and nobility.

== Ports ==
The game was widely ported from the original Commodore 64 version, first to the Apple II (1987), then later to IBM PC compatibles (1987), Apple IIGS (1988), Macintosh (1988), Amstrad CPC (1988), Atari ST (1989), Amiga (1990), and Nintendo Entertainment System (1991). The NES port was developed by Rare and published by Ultra Games. Tobacco is replaced as a trade item by "crops" because of Nintendo's family-friendly requirements.

The IBM PC version was originally released in 1987 as a self-booting disk, stored on either two 5¼-inch disks or a single 3½-inch disk. A version for MS-DOS compatible operating systems was released in 1994 on CD-ROM in Europe, edited by Kixx.

== Reception ==
Reception

Review scores
Publication	Score
AllGame	5/5
Computer Gaming World	5/5
Dragon	5/5
Compute!	4/5
Amstrad Computer User	16,5/20
Amiga Joker	88%
Amstrad Action	76%
Abandonia	5/5

Pirates! was a groundbreaking game in its era. Its puzzles appealed more to female gamers than previous products from MicroProse, a company known for military simulations like F-15 Strike Eagle. Although other open-ended games had already been released, the style of player-directed gameplay in Pirates! led it to be the spiritual predecessor of countless others since, both by Sid Meier himself (Civilization, Railroad Tycoon) and many others. The game has sold more than 1 million units worldwide.

Compute!'s Gazette in 1987 praised the detailed gameplay with arcade and strategic aspects, stating that "the designers of Pirates! set themselves a variety of ambitious goals and succeeded on every count". The magazine concluded that the game "is a real treasure". Computer Gaming World said that although reminiscent of The Seven Cities of Gold or Broadsides, "Pirates will prove to be a design with fresh approaches and much historical depth ... intriguing and addicting". The magazine gave Pirates! five stars out of five in a 1990 survey of historical strategy and war games, and four stars in a 1993 survey of pre 20th-century strategy games, calling it "a genre breakthrough, this is a fascinating simulation of the Age of Piracy".

Matthew J. Costello for Asimov's Science Fiction said that "[Arnold] Hendrick seemed to have helped supply the indefinable quality of fun and purpose that fills Pirates!. It's not just a game of battles, plunder, and divvying up the loot". The game was reviewed in 1988 in Dragon #132 by Hartley, Patricia, and Kirk Lesser in "The Role of Computers" column. The reviewers gave the game 5 out of 5 stars. PC Magazine praised Pirates!'s documentation as enjoyable to read, informative about history, and useful for playing the game. While criticizing the inability to install to hard disk, and other bugs and user interface issues, the magazine concluded that "for all its frustrations, Pirates! is an ambitious game that has a lot to offer in the way of entertainment. And you might even get a history lesson along the way". The Australian Commodore and Amiga Review noted excellent manual, and educational and historical aspects. Orson Scott Card wrote in Compute! in 1989 that Pirates' use of an unusually strict copy protection was understandable because "the game is so good that even people who drive 55 mph might consider stealing it". He said that Pirates! seemed misleadingly easy, with players discovering non-obvious nuances to the gameplay.

Pirates! won many awards, including Computer Gaming World's "Action Game of the Year" for 1988, and two Origins Awards: "Best Fantasy or Science Fiction Computer Game of 1987" and "Best Screen Graphics in a Home Computer Game of 1987". In 1989, Computer Gaming World named Pirates! to its Hall of Fame for games readers rated highly over time, with a score of 9.7 out of 12, and Compute! gave it the Compute! Choice Award for Historical Game. In 1990 Pirates! received the tenth-highest number of votes in a survey of Computer Gaming World readers' "All-Time Favorites". In 1996, the magazine ranked it as the 18th best video game of all time, noting that the Amiga version was by far the best by then. In 2004, readers of Retro Gamer voted Pirates! the 84th top retro game, with the staff noting that "people still play the original version, even though Sid Meier himself produced later versions". In 2005, IGN rated it as the sixth greatest video game of all time. In 2011, Polish web portal Wirtualna Polska ranked it as the fifth most addictive classic game "that stole our childhood". In 2006, abandonware website Abandonia's Sebatianos reviewed Pirates!, who was impressed with graphics and sounds.

== Legacy ==
Pirates!' success resulted in the similar Sword of the Samurai. The Pirates! Gold remake was released for Windows 3.1x, MS-DOS compatible operating systems, Classic Mac OS, and Sega Genesis in 1993. It was also released for the Amiga CD32 (1994) with enhanced CD audio tracks. Sun sighting is not in this version, and there were no special items. The game has several new features, such as extra missions assigned to the player by governors. The MS-DOS version has VGA graphics, a MIDI score, mouse support, and a copy protection scheme requiring the player to identify the flag of a pirate ship sighted on the horizon.

An enhanced remake published in 2004, also entitled Sid Meier's Pirates!, was released for Windows, Xbox, Xbox 360, Mac OS X, Wii, and PlayStation Portable.

Sid Meier's Pirates! Mobile was developed by Oasys Mobile in 2008. Mobile versions were later released for BlackBerry (2010) and iPad (2011). A version for the iPhone and iPod Touch was released in April 2012, published by 2K Games. In addition, the game was ported over to the Windows Phone 7 on 9 April 2012.

In 2013, Tommo purchased the rights to the game and began digitally publishing it through its Retroism brand.
