= Crusade in Europe (video game) =

1985 video game

- Publisher: MicroProse
- Designers: Sid Meier; Ed Bever
- Platforms: Apple II, Atari 8-bit, Commodore 64, MS-DOS
- Release: 1985
- Genre: Computer wargame
- Mode: Single-player

Crusade in Europe is a computer wargame published by MicroProse in 1985 for the Apple II, Atari 8-bit computers, Commodore 64, and MS-DOS. It was designed by Sid Meier and Ed Bever.

== Gameplay ==
Crusade in Europe is a game in which its five available major operations include Normandy, Race for the Rhine, Market Garden, Bulge and the Campaign Scenario.

== Reception ==
M. Evan Brooks reviewed the game for Computer Gaming World, and stated that "CIE offers five scenarios in one package, a bargain."
