= Fields of Glory =

1993 video game

- Developer(s): MicroProse
- Publisher(s): NA: Spectrum HoloByte; EU: MicroProse
- Designer(s): Jim Bambra; Adrian Earle
- Programmer(s): Steven W. Green; Mark Lyhane; Andrew Walrond
- Artist(s): Allan Holloway; Edward Garnier; Martin Calvert
- Composer(s): John Broomhall
- Platform(s): MS-DOS, Amiga, CD32
- Release: May 1993
- Genre(s): Real-time strategy
- Mode(s): Single-player

Fields of Glory is a real-time strategy video game published by MicroProse for MS-DOS, Amiga (both AGA and ECS) and Amiga CD32 in 1993. In the game, players can re-enact the four major historical battles in Napoleon's Waterloo campaign (The Battle of Ligny, Battle of Quatre-Bras, Battle of Waterloo and the Battle of Wavre), as well as play two hypothetical battles (Nivelles and Wagnee) which would have possibly taken place had some of the pre-campaign maneuvering been done differently. The battles in the game are fought in real-time, and strive to create a sense of realism. It is based on a series of tabletop games of the same name.

== Reception ==
Reception

Review score
Publication	Score
Hyper	78%

Computer Gaming World in July 1994 rated Fields of Glory three stars out of five. The reviewer praised the in-game database as "one of the best orders of battle ever developed for the computer, and almost justifies the game's purchase by itself", and the accurate terrain. He criticized the "incapable" AI, and real-time combat as being too fast at brigade level and too slow at corps level; since the game required both levels to win, he said that the Waterloo battle was too large to manage. The reviewer recommended the "challenging and interesting" game only to wargamers interested in the historical era.
