= Starlord (video game) =

1993 video game

- Developer: Third Millennium Software
- Publishers: MicroProse; Retroism (digital); Night Dive Studios (digital)
- Designers: Mike Singleton; Peter Barnett
- Platforms: MS-DOS, Amiga
- Release: MS-DOS: NA: 1993; Amiga: NA: 1994
- Genre: Strategy game
- Mode: Single-player

Starlord is a science-fiction strategy game developed by Third Millennium Software and published by MicroProse in 1993.
