= Fleet Defender =

1994 video game

- Developer: MicroProse
- Publisher: MicroProse
- Producer: Scott Spanburg
- Designers: Christopher Clark; Scott Elson; Michael J. McDonald; Detmar Peterke; Scott Spanburg; George Wargo; Ned Way
- Artist: Terrence Hodge
- Writer: Lawrence T. Russell
- Composer: Michael Bross
- Platforms: MS-DOS, PC-98
- Release: 1994: MS-DOS; 1995: PC-88
- Genre: Combat flight simulator
- Mode: Single-player

Fleet Defender is a combat flight simulator published by MicroProse in 1994. The game uses the F-14B version of the F-14 Tomcat even where anachronistic because the developers found the original, underpowered F-14A unforgiving and "not much fun" in an entertainment flight simulator. An expansion pack, Fleet Defender: Scenario, and a port for the PC-98 were released in 1995.

Tommo purchased the rights to this game and digitally published it through its Retroism brand in 2015.

== Gameplay ==
Fleet Defender models detailed carrier operations including air traffic and take-off/landing under various conditions. The player has control of both the pilot and radar intercept officer (RIO) who manages the AWG-9 radar. Emphasis is placed on using the AIM-54 Phoenix missile as a standoff weapon where possible, rather than engaging the more nimble Soviet fighters in close-quarters dogfighting. Wingmen formations and support aircraft can also be controlled; unlike previous MicroProse simulations, as Computer Gaming World reported in 1994, "No longer do you alone, armed with a single aircraft and eight missiles, engage the entire third world".

Three campaign theaters are included in the original game: The Oceana training theater, the North Cape theater, and the Mediterranean theater (Italy, the Balkans, and part of North Africa).

== Reception ==
Reception

Review score
Publication	Score
Computer Gaming World	4/5

Computer Gaming World in June 1994 said that "Fleet Defender pushes the envelope of desktop computers" but "strikes a very good balance between game play and pure graphic orgasm". Describing the game as a "tactical flight simulator" unlike a "close-in dog fighter like Falcon 3", it liked the accurate flight envelope, "extensive wingman controls", and "very good" enemy AI. The magazine concluded that "Fleet Defender is an outstanding simulator that will serve to reestablish MicroProse as a major player in the flight sim wars".
