= 7th Legion (video game) =

1997 video game

- North American cover art
- Developers: Epic MegaGames; Vision Software
- Publisher: MicroProse
- Producers: Robert A. Allen; Michael Mancuso
- Programmer: Paul Andrews
- Artists: Rodney Smith; Grant Wallis
- Composer: Blair Zuppicich
- Platform: Microsoft Windows
- Release: September 24, 1997
- Genre: Real-time strategy
- Modes: Single-player, multiplayer

7th Legion is a real-time strategy video game for Microsoft Windows, developed by Vision Software and Epic MegaGames and published by MicroProse in 1997. The game consists of two single-player campaigns and supports multiplayer online games. Tommo re-released the game on GOG.com in February 2014, but without multiplayer. In a joint effort, Nintendo was going to help Epic MegaGames port the game to Nintendo 64, but this port did not come to release.

== Gameplay ==
7th Legion is a real-time strategy game. Players assume the role of a commander of either the Chosen or those that were left behind, with the overall objective being to annihilate the other faction. To do so, the players have to amass funds to construct various buildings and war-machines, while recruiting foot soldiers to combat the enemy. Each player can collect special power-ups that would be found in boxes distributed across the map. These would provide bonuses to the force who collected the box. These bonuses include making the player's forces invisible to the enemy or increasing overall unit strength. Players could also take advantage of special "power cards". These cards have certain effects on events in-game; for example, some cards damage enemy troops, while others cause mechanical troops to malfunction.

== Plot ==
The conflict in 7th Legion takes place in the future. Rampant overpopulation and overuse of Earth's natural resources have regressed the planet's ecosystem to a critical point. The governments of Earth enact the Planetary Evacuation Program (PEP) to vacate the world in vast colony ships, leaving the planet to heal. Sufficient room and resources to house the entire population was not guaranteed on these exodus ships, and only a select few were able to earn a place on the ships and jump into Hyperspace. In the centuries following the evacuation, much of Earth's population perished, the scattered tribes of those left behind forming themselves into 7 "Legions", all vying for control of what is left. As the game begins, the seventh generation of the Chosen - those descended from the evacuees - return and aim to conquer the planet for themselves.

== Reception ==
Reception

Aggregate score
Aggregator	Score
GameRankings	54.50%%

Review scores
Publication	Score
GameSpot	41%
Game Revolution	D+
Gen4	2/5
Joystick	60%
PC Jeux	79%
PC Gaming World	9.5/10
