= 1942: The Pacific Air War =

1994 video game

- North American cover art
- Developer(s): MPS Labs
- Publisher(s): MicroProse
- Designer(s): Ed Fletcher; John Paquin; Michael Rea
- Artist(s): Todd Brizzi
- Platform(s): MS-DOS
- Release: NA: 1994; EU: 1994
- Genre(s): Flight simulator
- Mode(s): Single-player, multiplayer

1942: The Pacific Air War is combat flight simulation developed and published by MicroProse for MS-DOS in 1994. It is based on the U.S. and Japanese Pacific War conflict from 1942 to 1945. An expansion pack, 1942: The Pacific Air War – Scenario, was released in 1995. A sequel, European Air War, was released in 1998. Tommo purchased the rights to 1942 and digitally publishes it through its Retroism brand in 2015.

== Gameplay ==
This simulation includes aerial combat, ground attack, and naval engagements in the Pacific Theater of Operations. The game can be played as a flight simulator or a wargame. A player can fight a single battle in mission mode or follow the war in tour of duty mode.

In tour of duty mode, a player manages his fleets and air bases on a strategic campaign map. When aircraft engages in battle, the player can jump into the cockpit of any aircraft in combat.

The game also features a fairly advanced recording and editing tool allowing the player to film a mission after its completion. The player can use any number of cameras and place them anywhere in the scene. Also the timeline can be scrubbed back and forth and edits can be customised.

== Reception ==
Computer Gaming World's reviewer, an Air National Guard F-16 flight instructor, in August 1994 rated the game four stars out of five. Praising the graphics, frame rate, and virtual cockpit, he stated that the flight modeling forced him to use the same tactics as real pilots during the war, with better game balance than Aces of the Pacific. The reviewer concluded that MicroProse succeeded in creating a "serious flight sim" with "staying power to spare".

PC Gamer US presented 1942 with its 1994 "Best Simulation" award. The editors called it an essential component of flight-sim fan's library. 1942 was named the 71st best computer game ever by PC Gamer UK in 1997.
