= Bill Stealey =

American game developer and publisher

- Born: John Wilbur Stealey Sr.
- Education: United States Air Force Academy; The Wharton School
- Military career
- Allegiance: United States
- Branch: Pennsylvania Air National Guard; USAF Reserve
- Service years: 1970–1993
- Rank: Lieutenant colonel
- Nickname: Wild Bill

John Wilbur Stealey Sr., better known as Bill Stealey, is an American game developer and publisher, and a former military pilot. Stealey founded MicroProse with Sid Meier in 1982 and released many flight simulators with the company. He was known for his appearances in military uniform and aerial stunts aboard the company's real plane while promoting the games. After a brief retirement in the early 1990s, he founded iEntertainment Network in 1995 and is the current CEO. In 2018 he also re-acquired MicroProse assets and revived the studio with David Lagettie. Stealey acts largely in a consultancy capacity at the revived studio.

== Career ==
=== US Air Force and consultancy ===
Stealey had the goal of becoming a fighter pilot and eventually a general. He attended Pennsylvania Military College in the 1960s; he wore glasses but "fought his way into the program" regardless, and was granted a waiver. This allowed him to attend the United States Air Force Academy in 1966, but unfortunately a "minor slip-up in his final days dropped him to sixth in his class and out of the running for the fighter assignments." He was however asked to work as a flight instructor after his graduation in 1970, flying the T-37. Stealey has stated that he was advocating for computer based flight simulators in military training as early as 1971, but faced opposition due to fears of new pilots losing flight hours. He attained the rank of Captain before leaving active service and going back into education, while continuing to serve with the Pennsylvania Air National Guard over the following decade.

Initially considering a law school, he realised that he would be better served with an MBA and so attended Wharton School of Business. He became a consultant with Cresap, McCormick & Paget, and later McKinsey & Company. He has stated that he was not very good at consultancy, as he would want to solve problems for the clients immediately and not sit and wait for them to "talk for years". He took job with General Instrument in corporate strategy. He built some novel software for the business for financial planning, and while purchasing computer hardware for the company he encountered early video games on the Atari and met Sid Meier, then also employed by General Instrument.

=== MicroProse ===
At a company function in Las Vegas in 1982, he was seated next to Meier, and discussed setting up a games business. The two spent time together in Vegas and competed against one another for high scores on a Red Baron arcade cabinet. Stealey was shocked that Meier beat his score, considering he had actual pilot experience, but Meier's knowledge of video games was more important for the contest.

The two founded MicroProse Software, which published its first title Hellcat Ace later that year. At that time Stealey and Meier were the only employees, with Meier developing the titles and Stealey testing them and offering advice on military accuracy. The group were simply packaging floppy disks and printing labels in Stealey's basement, but found economic success quickly. Meier and Stealey would later purchase the exact Red Baron cabinet they had competed on as a memento. The group primarily produced flight simulators through the 1980s, such as F-15 Strike Eagle (1984). Stealey's air force experience was used in their marketing for these titles, with Stealey appearing in military uniform at events. From the late 1980s Meier began to lose interest in flight simulators, and pushed to have his idea for a pirate game made by the company. In response to Meier's insistence, Stealey declared that the game should be titled "Sid Meier’s pirate-whatever", which led to the continued use of a "Sid Meier's..." prefix on video games from the designer. This was carried on into the Civilization franchise and beyond Meier's work at MicroProse.

In 1988, the group purchased a North American T-28 Trojan, which Stealey named "Miss MicroProse". He would fly games journalists in an effort to promote their games. He also ran a competition called I Cheated Death with Major Bill which selected three fans to fly with him on a "stunt-filled flight lesson". That year he was also responsible for setting up the collaboration with Tom Clancy for the military simulator Red Storm Rising. Stealey purchased Meier's half of the company in 1991, amid a disagreement over their direction. Stealey had believed in a resurgence of the arcade market, which ultimately failed and resulted in his sale of the company to Spectrum HoloByte in 1993. He resigned from the company following the merger and announced his retirement, with the intention to "play golf for a living". He retired from the military with the rank of lieutenant colonel.

=== Baltimore Spirit ===
Stealey had been a fan of the Baltimore Blast soccer team since the 1980s, having previously sponsored trips for the group. In 1988 he had also included the Blast's goalkeeper Keith Van Eron in MicroProse Soccer. When the MISL collapsed in the summer of 1992, Stealey stepped in and bought the team which was renamed to Baltimore Spirit and shifted to the NPSL. It retained many of the same players, along with the original coach Kenny Cooper. Cooper and Stealey had a "falling out" in 1994; Cooper resigned after Stealey declined to sell, and was replaced by Dave MacWilliams. The team's record over the following years was consistently poor, and Stealey lost $3 million in the venture before he sold it to Ed Hale in 1998.

=== Interactive Magic / iEntertainment Network ===
Stealey started the game software company Interactive Magic in 1995. Next Generation listed him in their "75 Most Important People in the Games Industry of 1995" for his roles as former head of MicroProse and then-current head of Interactive Magic. Stealey sold it in 1999, but re-purchased it in 2002 and renamed it to iEntertainment Network.

In 2018, Stealey worked together with David Lagettie to re-acquire MicroProse; the studio announced its first new titles in 2020. Stealey is considered the co-founder but has no specific role at the new MicroProse, providing consultancy and mentorship only due to his age.

== Personal life ==
In the 1980s and 1990s Bill Stealey flew planes recreationally on a regular basis. In 1987, an engine failure occurred aboard his plane which forced an emergency landing in poor visibility conditions, but he survived the encounter.

Stealey is fond of golf, and has often mentioned his love for the sport. He took a six-month sabbatical from the games industry in 1992 to travel around the United States playing the sport.

He has 14 grandchildren as of 2020.
