= Harrier Jump Jet (video game) =

1992 video game

- Developer: MicroProse
- Publisher: MicroProse
- Platform: MS-DOS
- Release: NA: 1992
- Genre: Flight simulator
- Mode: Single-player

Harrier Jump Jet, aka Jump Jet is a flight simulator published by MicroProse in 1992.

== Reception ==
Computer Gaming World liked the flight model and "beautiful seamless graphics", but criticized the campaign mode as "old-fashioned ... no wingmen, no interaction with one's forces, no dynamic battlefield, no feeling of being involved ... a dressed up version of F-19". The magazine recommended Domark's AV-8B Harrier Assault instead.
