= Spitfire Ace =

1982 video game

- Developer: MicroProse
- Publishers: NA: MicroProse; EU: U.S. Gold
- Designer: Sid Meier
- Programmers: Atari 8-bit Sid Meier; Commodore 64; Ron G. Verovsky; IBM PC; R. Donald Awalt
- Platforms: Atari 8-bit, Commodore 64, IBM PC
- Release: 1982: Atari; 1984: C64, IBM PC
- Genre: Combat flight simulator
- Mode: Single-player

Spitfire Ace is a combat flight simulator video game created and published by MicroProse in 1982 shortly after it was founded. It was one of the first video games designed and programmed by Sid Meier, originally developed for Atari 8-bit computers and ported to the Commodore 64 and IBM PC compatibles (as a self-booting disk) in 1984. The game followed on the heel's of Meier's Hellcat Ace, also from 1982 and for the Atari 8-bit computers.

== Gameplay ==
The game puts the player in the pilot's seat during World War II. The player defends London during The Blitz while flying the Supermarine Spitfire. The game offers 15 different scenarios that include France, Malta and D-Day.

== Development ==
Sid Meier developed Spitfire Ace as a modified version of Hellcat Ace, another game he programmed, released earlier that same year. In his 2020 memoir, Meier described Spitfire Ace as "the kind of game we'd probably call an expansion pack today. It used the same code base as Hellcat Ace, but moved the battle scenarios from the Pacific to the European theater."

== Reception ==
Softline in 1984 called Spitfire Ace and Hellcat Ace's graphics "extremely simple". Computer Gaming World in 1993 stated that the game "has been severely wrinkled by age".

== Reviews ==
- Fire & Movement #76
