= Sid Meier =

American game programmer and designer (born 1954)

- Meier at the 2017 Game Developers Conference
- Born: February 24, 1954 (age 72); Sarnia, Ontario, Canada
- Education: University of Michigan (BA)
- Occupations: Businessman, computer programmer
- Years active: 1981–present
- Employer: 2K Games
- Known for: MicroProse, Firaxis Games, Civilization series
- Spouse: Susan Meier
- Children: Ryan Meier
- Awards: AIAS Hall of Fame Award (1999)

Sidney K. Meier (/ˈmaɪər/ MIRE; born February 24, 1954) is an American businessman and computer programmer. A programmer, designer, and producer of many strategy and simulation video games, including the Civilization series, Meier co-founded MicroProse in 1982 with Bill Stealey and is the Director of Creative Development of Firaxis Games, which he co-founded with Jeff Briggs and Brian Reynolds in 1996. For his contributions to the video game industry, Meier was inducted into the Academy of Interactive Arts and Sciences Hall of Fame.

== Early life and education ==
Meier was born in Sarnia, Ontario, Canada, to parents of Dutch and Swiss descent, which conferred on him both Canadian and Swiss citizenship upon birth. When he was about three years old, his family moved to Detroit, Michigan, where he was raised. At the University of Michigan, he studied history and computer science, graduating with a Bachelor of Arts degree in computer science in 1975.

== Career ==
Following college, Meier worked in developing cash register systems for department stores. During this timeframe, Meier acquired an Atari 800 around 1981, an experience that led him to the realization of the potential for employing computer programming in the creation of video games. He found a co-worker, Bill Stealey, who had a similar interest in developing games, and shared the games that Meier had developed. The two decided to establish a new company for computer game development subsequent to the widespread advancement and growth of the software and personal computer industries, which were developing extensively during the initial years of the 1980s.

=== MicroProse ===
Sid Meier has stated on numerous occasions that he emphasizes the "fun parts" of a simulation and throws out the rest.

— Computer Gaming World, 1994

Meier founded MicroProse with Stealey in 1982. After a few initial 2D action games, such as Meier's platformer Floyd of the Jungle, MicroProse settled into a run of flight simulation titles beginning with Hellcat Ace (1982) and continuing with Spitfire Ace (1982), Solo Flight (1983), and F-15 Strike Eagle (1985), all designed and programmed by Meier.

The first appearance of Meier's name on the retail box of a game was as the credited creator of Formula 1 Racing in 1982. In 1984, Stealey began marketing Meier himself, hoping to attract other developers by promoting him as an auteur; by 1986, MicroProse was using Meier's name and face in advertisements for its games. In 1987, the company released Sid Meier's Pirates!, the first game with Meier's name in the title. He later explained that the inclusion of his name was because Pirates! is very different from the company's earlier titles. Stealey decided that Meier's name would make those who purchased the flight simulators more likely to play the game. Stealey recalled: "We were at dinner at a Software Publishers Association meeting, and Robin Williams was there. And he kept us in stitches for two hours. And he turns to me and says 'Bill, you should put Sid's name on a couple of these boxes, and promote him as the star.' And that's how Sid's name got on Pirates, and Civilization."

The idea was successful; by 1992, an entry in Computer Gaming World's poetry contest praised Meier's name as "a guarantee they got it right". While emphasizing that he did not encourage MicroProse promoting his name, Meier did insist on doing all of the work on games himself, including sound and art, until work by artist Michael Haire, whom Stealey had hired for Silent Service (1985), persuaded him. Meier is not always the main designer on titles that carry his name. For instance, Brian Reynolds has been credited as the primary designer behind Sid Meier's Civilization II, Sid Meier's Alpha Centauri, and Sid Meier's Colonization, while Jeff Briggs designed Sid Meier's Civilization III, Soren Johnson led Sid Meier's Civilization IV, Jon Shafer led Sid Meier's Civilization V, and Will Miller and David McDonough were the designers of Sid Meier's Civilization: Beyond Earth.

After the release of F-19 Stealth Fighter, Meier focused on strategy games, later saying "Everything I thought was cool about a flight simulator had gone into that game." Inspired by SimCity and Empire, he created Sid Meier's Railroad Tycoon and later the game series for which he is most widely recognized, Sid Meier's Civilization, although he designed only the first installment.

Around 1990, Stealey wanted to expand MicroProse to produce arcade games, which Meier felt was too risky. One arcade video game was released without Meier's involvement: an improved version of F-15 Strike Eagle II under the name F-15 Strike Eagle. Unable to resolve the matter with Stealey, Meier sold Stealey his half of the company, but remained with the company in his same role.

=== Firaxis Games ===
Sid Meier at the Game Developers Conference, 2010

MicroProse, after it had become a public company, merged with Spectrum HoloByte in 1993 under Spectrum's name, with Spectrum as the operating company. As a cost-cutting measure, Spectrum cut many of the jobs at MicroProse in 1996 and consolidated much of their operations. Meier, along with MicroProse employees Jeff Briggs and Brian Reynolds, were dissastified with these decisions, and opted to leave the company to form Firaxis Games in 1997.

Firaxis continued to develop the same type of strategy games that Meier had developed at MicroProse, many of which are follow-ups to those titles, such as the new Civilization games and a remake of Sid Meier's Pirates! (2004). In 1996, he was granted a patent for a "System for Real-Time Music Composition and Synthesis" used in C.P.U. Bach. Next Generation listed him in their "75 Most Important People in the Games Industry of 1995", calling him "a prolific developer of some of the best games in [MicroProse]'s catalog".

According to Firaxis employees, Meier has been constantly developing a special game engine since around 1996 which he uses to prototype his game ideas and which he has not shared with anyone else. Dennis Shirk, a senior producer, said in 2016 that Meier would sometimes arrive at the office and announce he had a new game prototype for the company to try out and see if it could be developed further. The engine is believed by Firaxis employees to be based on his original Civilization source, but expanded over the years with updates that he or other engineers will write for him.

Meier worked with a team on a dinosaur-themed game starting in early 2000, but announced in an online development diary in 2001 that the game had been shelved. Despite trying various approaches, including turn-based and real-time gameplay, he said he found no way to make the concept fun enough. In 2005, he said, "We've been nonstop busy making other games over the past several years, so the dinosaur game remains on the shelf. However, I do love the idea of a dinosaur game and would like to revisit it when I have some time."

An autobiography, Sid Meier's Memoir!: A Life in Computer Games, was published on September 8, 2020, by W. W. Norton & Company.

=== Development style ===
Computer Gaming World reported in 1994 that "Sid Meier has stated on numerous occasions that he emphasizes the 'fun parts' of a simulation and throws out the rest". The magazine reported that year how "Meier insisted that discovering the elusive quality of fun is the toughest part of design." According to PC Gamer, "Though his games are frequently about violent times and places, there is never any blood or gore shown. He designs and creates his games by playing them, over and over, until they are fun."

== Personal life ==
Meier lives in Hunt Valley, Maryland, with his second wife Susan. He is a devout Christian, and he and his wife attend Faith Evangelical Lutheran Church in Cockeysville, where he is the Director of Contemporary Music. Susan was one of the original 13 employees at Firaxis Games along with Sid. Meier has a son, Ryan Meier, who worked for Blizzard Entertainment, Firaxis Games, and Google.

== Awards ==
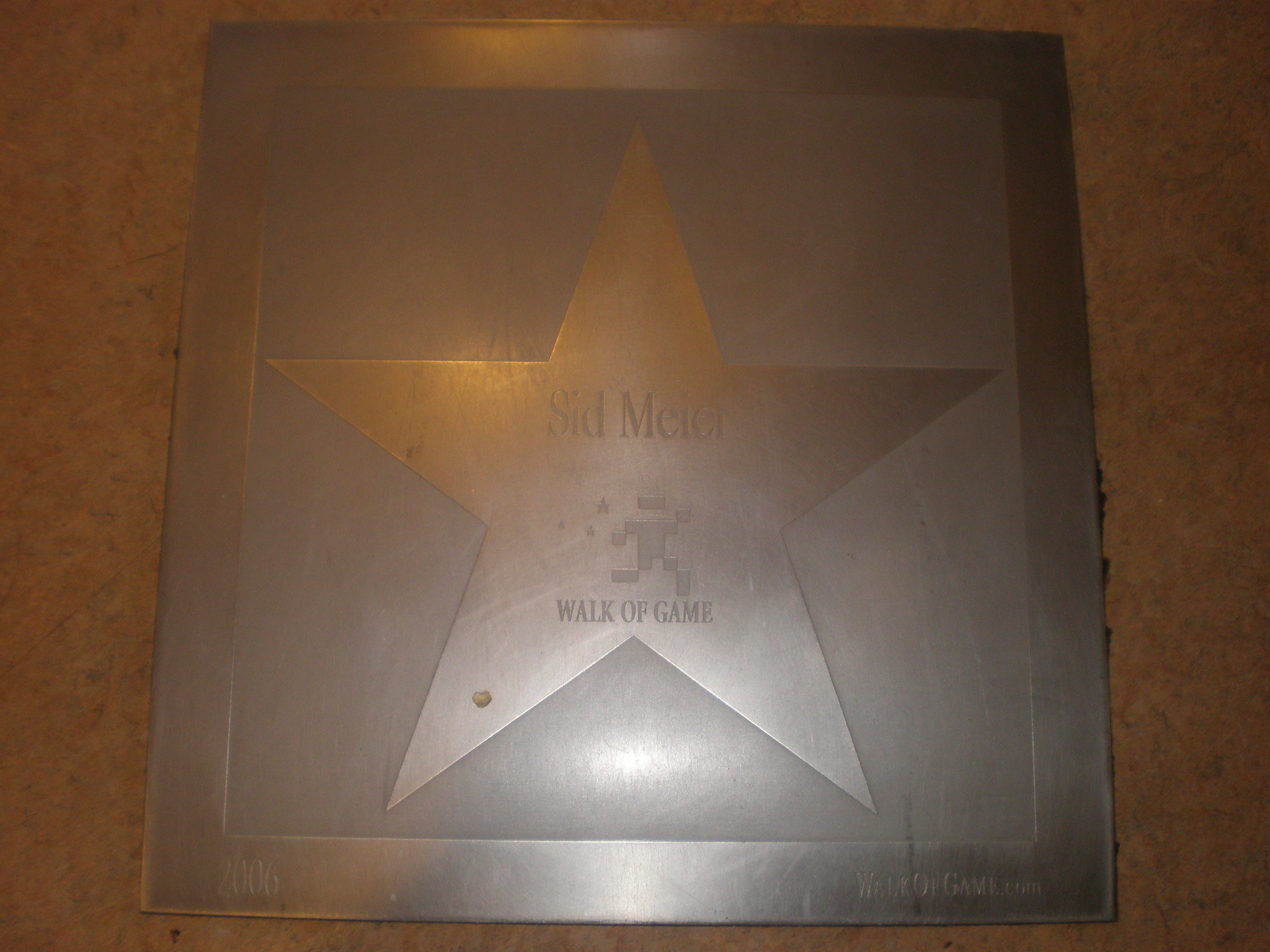
Meier's star at the Walk of Game in the Metreon, San Francisco

In 1996, GameSpot put Meier at the top of their listing of the "Most Influential People in Computer Gaming of All Time", calling him "our Hitchcock, our Spielberg, our Ellington". That same year, Computer Gaming World ranked him as eighth on the list of the "Most Influential Industry Players of All Time", noting that no game designer has had as many CGW Hall of Fame games as Sid Meier. In 1997, Computer Gaming World ranked him as number one on the list of the "Most Influential People of All Time in Computer Gaming", for game design. In 1999, he became the second person to be inducted into the Academy of Interactive Arts and Sciences' Hall of Fame.

In 2008, Meier received a Lifetime Achievement Award at the 2008 Game Developer's Conference. In 2009, he came fifth in a Develop survey that asked some 9,000 game makers about their "ultimate development hero". In 2009, he was ranked second in IGN's list of "Top Game Creators of All Time", and was called "the ideal role model for any aspiring game designer". In 2017, he was awarded the Life Achievement by the Golden Joystick Awards.

== Ludography ==
Meier has been the developer, co-developer, and producer of many games. A complete list of his works which includes early non-commercial titles is available in the appendix of Sid Meier's Memoir!

Release	Game	Notes
1981	Bank Game I	Meier was paid to make a game for a bank with a piggybank catching falling coins.
1981	Bank Game II	In Meier's second bank-game the goal was to cross the road to the bank.
1981	Faux Space Invaders	Written in assembly, and a local store bought five or ten copies.
1981	Faux Pac-Man	Pac-Man rip-off, developed as training and shared with the users group.
1982	Formula 1 Racing	The first commercial game by Sid Meier, published by Acorn Software Products Inc.
1982	Hellcat Ace	Sid Meier's first project for MicroProse according to Bill Stealey.
1982	Chopper Rescue	Improved and commercial version of Hostage Rescue. Sid Meier has said this was the first game he wrote at MicroProse.
1982	Spitfire Ace	
1982	Floyd of the Jungle	
1983	NATO Commander	
1983	Wingman	
1983	Floyd of the Jungle II	
1983	Solo Flight	
1984	Air Rescue I	
1984	F-15 Strike Eagle	
1985	Silent Service	World War II submarine simulation game
1985	Crusade in Europe	
1985	Decision in the Desert	
1986	Conflict in Vietnam	Last Sid Meier game released for Atari 8-bit computers.
1986	Gunship	
1987	Sid Meier's Pirates!	A pirate simulation game based around life of a pirate, a privateer, or a pirate hunter in the 16th–18th centuries. The first game to have Sid Meier's name included in its title.
1988	Red Storm Rising	Nuclear submarine simulation game, based on the novel by Tom Clancy.
1988	F-19 Stealth Fighter	
1989	F-15 Strike Eagle II	
1990	Covert Action	An espionage game offering a range of arcade-style game modes.
1990	Sid Meier's Railroad Tycoon	A business simulation game that paints the early development of railroads in the United States and Europe. With the release of Sid Meier's Railroads!, this series now has four installments.
1991	Sid Meier's Civilization	A vastly successful turn-based strategy game, that has now run to a franchise (see below). This is Meier's most successful game franchise to date, having sold over 73 million copies as of August 2024.
1993	Pirates! Gold	Remake of 1987's Pirates! game that included several new features, such as extra missions. Paul Murphy was lead designer on the game.
1994	Sid Meier's Colonization	A turn-based strategy game themed on the early European colonization of the New World.
1994	C.P.U. Bach	Meier's patented music-making program for 3DO, that became a commercial failure.
1995	Sid Meier's CivNet	A remake of Civilization with support for internet-based multiplayer gameplay.
1996	Sid Meier's Civilization II	Follow-up to Sid Meier's successful Civilization; Brian Reynolds was lead designer on the game.
1997	Magic: The Gathering	This would be the last game that Sid Meier worked on for MicroProse.
1997	Sid Meier's Gettysburg!	Sid Meier's first real-time tactical game.
1999	Sid Meier's Alpha Centauri	Brian Reynolds was lead designer on this adaptation of Civilization to an extraterrestrial theme.
1999	Sid Meier's Antietam!	Sid Meier's Gettysburg and Antietam are part of his Civil War set.
2001	Sid Meier's Civilization III	Jeff Briggs designed the third installment of the series, with more complex rules, graphics and gameplay.
2002	Sid Meier's SimGolf	A golfing simulation in which the player built their own golf course and played it against computer players, co-created by Maxis. (Not to be confused with Maxis' 1996 title SimGolf.)
2004	Sid Meier's Pirates!	Follow-up to the acclaimed Pirates! game from 1987, updating the graphics and featuring some entirely new gameplay elements.
2005	Sid Meier's Civilization IV	Designed by Soren Johnson. A full 3D engine replaces the isometric maps of Civilization II and III.
2006	Sid Meier's Railroads!	When Take-Two shut down PopTop Software and folded it into Firaxis, Meier once again became responsible for the Railroad Tycoon series, and this is billed as the sequel to Railroad Tycoon 3.
2008	Sid Meier's Civilization Revolution	A seventh generation console edition of Civilization.
2008	Sid Meier's Pirates! Mobile	The game was developed and published by Oasys Mobile and was led by one of the original programmers for Pirates! Gold.
2008	Sid Meier's Railroad Tycoon Mobile	Developed by Blue Heat and published by Oasys Mobile. This mobile version allows players to build their own transportation empire.
2008	Sid Meier's Civilization IV: Colonization	A 2008 remake of the 1994 Colonization, and a standalone game based on the Civilization IV engine.
2010	Sid Meier's Civilization V	Headed by Jon Shafer with new features.
2011	Sid Meier's CivWorld	A massively multiplayer online game released on Facebook. Game closed down on May 29, 2013.
2013	Sid Meier's Ace Patrol	A World War I flight strategy game published by 2K Games.
2013	Sid Meier's Ace Patrol: Pacific Skies	A World War II flight strategy game published by 2K Games.
2014	Sid Meier's Civilization Revolution 2	A mobile sequel to Sid Meier's Civilization Revolution.
2014	Sid Meier's Civilization: Beyond Earth	A spiritual successor to Sid Meier's Alpha Centauri built atop the Civilization V engine.
2015	Sid Meier's Starships	Follows on from Sid Meier's Civilization: Beyond Earth.
2016	Sid Meier's Civilization VI	Sixth main title in the Civilization series.
2025	Sid Meier's Civilization VII	Seventh main title in the Civilization series.
