= Task Force 1942 =

1992 video game

- Developer: MPS Labs
- Publisher: MicroProse
- Director: Lawrence Schick
- Designers: Lawrence Schick; Ed Fletcher
- Programmer: Ed Fletcher
- Artist: Max D. Remington III
- Composers: Jeffery L. Briggs; Roland J. Rizzo
- Platform: MS-DOS
- Release: 1992
- Mode: Single-player

Task Force 1942: Surface Naval Action in the South Pacific is an MS-DOS video game released by MPS Labs (MicroProse) in 1992.

The game is a surface naval simulation which allows the player to operate single ships or a task force made up of ships, from the United States Navy (USN), Royal Australian Navy (RAN) and Royal New Zealand Navy (RNZN), or the Imperial Japanese Navy (IJN) in the South Pacific during WWII. It was designed to run under PC DOS or MS-DOS, version 5.0 or higher. The specific historical setting was the series of ferocious naval engagements fought around the largest island in the Solomon Islands chain, Guadalcanal, in 1942.

== Gameplay ==
Game screen.

The player can fight either for the US Navy and its ANZAC allies, or the Imperial Japanese Navy. The player can start a single engagement (historical battle or battle made from the editor) or play in the campaign mode. Campaign mode takes place on the Guadalcanal campaign. The player is given full control over the naval forces of either side based in Espiritu Santo for the Allies, or Rabaul for the Imperial Japanese Navy. The player's goal is to capture Guadalcanal providing its ground forces with sufficient reinforcements and supply, while trying to disrupt the other side's own efforts.

Apart from ships, the player has control over land-based air assets which can be used as real-time reconnaissance.

== Reception ==
Task Force 1942 was mentioned in 1993 in Dragon #193 by Hartley, Patricia, and Kirk Lesser in "The Role of Computers" column. The reviewers normally gave a game from 1 to 5 stars, but instead gave this game an "X" for "Not recommended". This was due to the installation of the game not functioning properly on the reviewer's own PC, and thus not enabling them to actually boot-up and play the game. A 1993 Computer Gaming World survey of wargames gave the game three-plus stars out of five, approving of the graphics and depth of gameplay but criticizing the user interface and tactical-level AI.
