= Knights of the Sky =

1990 video game

- Developer: MicroProse
- Publisher: MicroProse
- Designer: Jeff Briggs
- Platforms: MS-DOS, Amiga, Atari ST
- Release: 1990: MS-DOS; 1991: Amiga, Atari ST
- Genre: Combat flight simulator
- Modes: Single-player, multiplayer (head-to-head)

Knights of the Sky is a World War I combat flight simulator designed by Jeff Briggs and published by MicroProse in 1990 for MS-DOS. Ports to the Amiga and Atari ST followed in 1991.

A MicroProse action-strategy game titled Knights of the Sky (actually a Sega Genesis port of 1992's The Ancient Art of War in the Skies) was also completed in 1994 but never released.

Tommo purchased the rights to this game and digitally published it through its Retroism brand in 2015.

== Gameplay ==
Knights of the Sky has multiple gameplay options including full World War 1 campaign, single dogfight, head to head and flight training.

The World War 1 campaign mode involves the players through a series of missions. Each mission contains an objective (ex: bomb a specific German airport behind enemy lines) as well as a number of dogfights that would naturally arise in the course of attempting to complete the primary objective. The game would track the number of enemy planes the players shot down in total and would rank the character as compared to other famous World War I aces. Iconic World War 1 flying aces like the Red Baron as well as other well-known historic figures are included in the game and would occasionally be encountered in dogfights. When progressing through the game the mechanic would provide intel on where the players might encounter these aces.

The single Dogfight mode allows the player to select from a number of historical World War 1 aces with which to engage in a dogfight.

Head to head mode allows the player to challenge another player to a dogfight.

== Development ==
The game's working title was Red Baron, until this name was used by Dynamix for Red Baron when the latter had been publicly announced first. Following its original PC release, the game underwent two subsequent patch-style revisions that would add a more realistic plane damage system (source of much of the early controversy, as just one well placed bullet could cause critical damage and taking non-critical hits were not communicated to the player whatsoever), and active NPC allied planes undergoing their patrols (in a way similar to enemy patrols), available for free after sending a blank floppy disk to MicroProse.

== Reception ==
Knights of the Sky was a critical success. Computer Gaming World liked the game replay and other external views, and the challenging computer opponents. The magazine concluded that "this game is a must for WWI fans and flight simulation fans". In a 1991 survey of World War I flight simulations, Computer Gaming World called Knights of the Sky "the most realistic", superior to Dynamix's Red Baron for "the advanced air combat simulation jocks"; a survey of strategy and war games that year and in 1993 gave it three and a half stars out of five, preferring Red Baron. Amiga Power awarded 87% on its initial port for the Amiga, praising the feel of the gameplay, vivid graphics and quality presentation. Criticisms included a low framerate compared to the DOS version, poor handling of analogue joystick or mouse control, and having to use the keyboard to glance around during a dogfight. On the game's budget re-release in 1993, Amiga Power revised their score to 92%, emphasising the exciting dogfights and scenery appreciation that come with simulating the low-speed World War I aircraft. In 1996, the latter ranked it as the 10th best Amiga game of all time.
