= F-15 Strike Eagle (video game) =

1984 video game

- Developers: MicroProse; FIL (Thomson); NMS Software (GB/GG)
- Publishers: MicroProse; FIL (Thomson)
- Designer: Sid Meier
- Composers: Ken Lagace (NES); Mark Cooksey (GB/GG)
- Platforms: Atari 8-bit, Apple II, Commodore 64, IBM PC, Atari ST, Amstrad CPC, ZX Spectrum, MSX, Thomson, PC-88, PC-98, Arcade, NES, Game Boy, Game Gear
- Release: 1984: Atari 8-bit; 1985: Apple II, C64, PC, ST; 1987: Amstrad, MSX, Spectrum, Thomson; 1991: Arcade; 1992: NES; 1993: Game Boy, Game Gear
- Genre: Combat flight simulation
- Mode: Single-player

F-15 Strike Eagle is an F-15 Strike Eagle combat flight simulation game released by MicroProse for the Atari 8-bit computers in 1984 then ported to other systems. It is the first in the F-15 Strike Eagle series followed by F-15 Strike Eagle II and F-15 Strike Eagle III. An arcade version of the game was released simply as F-15 Strike Eagle in 1991, which uses higher-end hardware than was available in home systems, including the TMS34010 graphics-oriented CPU.

== Gameplay ==
Gameplay screenshot (Atari 8-bit)

The game begins with the player selecting Libya (much like Operation El Dorado Canyon), the Persian Gulf, or Vietnam as a mission theater. Play then begins from the cockpit of an F-15 already in flight and equipped with a variety of missiles, bombs, drop tanks, flares and chaff. The player flies the plane in combat to bomb various targets including a primary and secondary target while also engaging in air-to-air combat with enemy fighters.

The game ends when either the player's plane crashes, is destroyed, or when the player returns to base.

According to Bill Stealey the game mechanics and the content of the manuals were all based on non-classified information that received approval from the relevant authorities. Regardless, the Soviet embassy in Washington purchased four copies on launch day; Commodore User speculated that this was in an attempt to learn more about the real aircraft. The game's depiction of the F-15 was significantly more accurate than its contemporaries.

== Ports ==
The game was first released for Atari 8-bit computers, with ports appearing from 1985-87 for the Apple II, Commodore 64, ZX Spectrum, MSX, and Amstrad CPC. It was also ported to the IBM PC as a self-booting disk, being one of the first games that MicroProse company released for IBM compatibles. The initial IBM release came on a self-booting disk and supported only CGA graphics, but a revised version in 1986 was offered on 3.5" disks and added limited EGA support (which added the ability to change color palettes if an EGA card was present).

Versions for the Game Boy, Game Gear, and NES were published in the early 1990s.

== Reception ==
F-15 Strike Eagle was a commercial blockbuster. It sold 250,000 copies by March 1987, and surpassed 1 million units in 1989. It ultimately reached over 1.5 million sales overall, and was MicroProse's best-selling Commodore game as of late 1987. Computer Gaming World in 1984 called F-15 "an excellent simulation" with "excellent documentation". It stated that "the action is fast and furious ... the graphics are excellent". The game won the "Action game of the Year" in the magazine's 1985 reader poll. In a 1994 survey of wargames the magazine gave the title two stars out of five, stating that "the first 'classic' fighter simulation" was "well loved in its time" but "extremely dated". Antic approved of the Atari ST version's graphical and speed improvements, and ability to save progress. Compute! listed the game in 1988 as one of "Our Favorite Games", stating that it "makes jet fighter combat nerve-wracking and fun at the same time".
