= MicroProse =

American video game company

MicroProse Software Pty. Limited

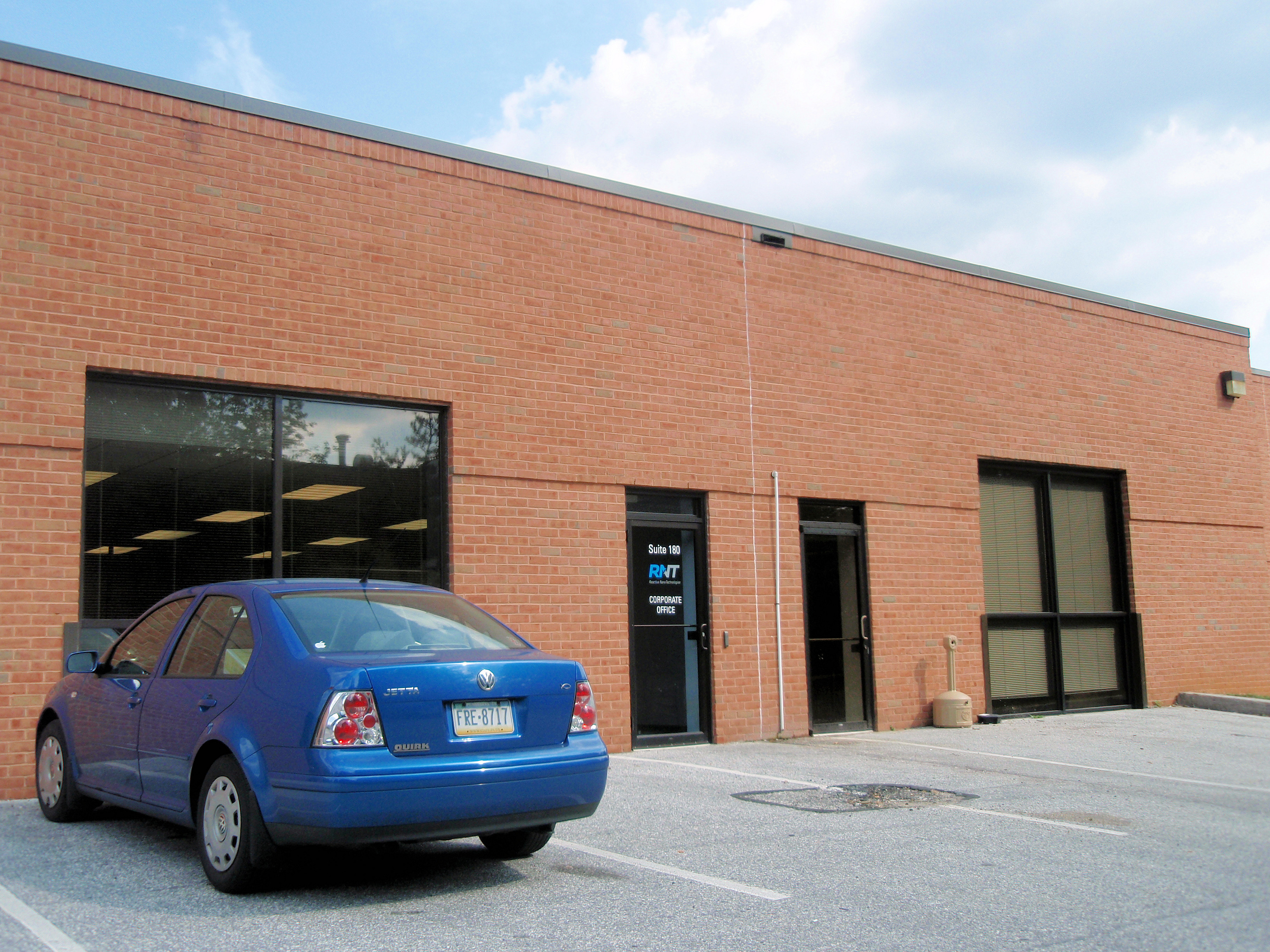
- The former MicroProse headquarters in Hunt Valley
- Formerly: MicroProse Software, Inc. (1982–2001); Infogrames Interactive Hunt Valley Studio (2001–2003); Atari Interactive Hunt Valley Studio (2003)
- Type: Private
- Industry: Video games
- Founded: 1982; 44 years ago (Note: The original company closed in 2003. The current MicroProse is founded by David Lagettie.)
- Founders: Sid Meier; Bill Stealey
- Headquarters: Hunt Valley, Maryland, U.S.
- Key people: David Lagettie, CEO (2019–present)
- Parent: Spectrum HoloByte (1993–1998); Atari Interactive (1998–2003); Interactive Game Group (2007–2010); Cybergun (2010–2018)
- Website: www.microprose.com

MicroProse is an American video game publisher and developer founded by Bill Stealey and Sid Meier in 1982. It developed and published numerous games, including starting the Civilization and X-COM series. Most of their internally developed titles were vehicle simulation and strategy games.

In 1993, the company lost most of its UK-based personnel and became a subsidiary of Spectrum HoloByte. Subsequent cuts and corporate policies led to Sid Meier, Jeff Briggs and Brian Reynolds leaving and forming Firaxis Games in 1996, as MicroProse closed its ex-Simtex development studio in Austin, Texas. In 1998, following an unsuccessful buyout attempt by GT Interactive, the struggling MicroProse (Spectrum HoloByte) became a wholly owned subsidiary of Hasbro Interactive and its development studios in Alameda, California, and Chapel Hill, North Carolina, were closed the following year. In 2001, MicroProse ceased to exist as an entity and Hasbro Interactive sold the MicroProse intellectual properties to Infogrames Entertainment, SA. MicroProse UK's main office in Chipping Sodbury was closed in 2002, followed by the company's headquarters in Hunt Valley, Maryland, in 2003.

The brand was revived in 2007 when Interactive Game Group acquired it from Atari Interactive, formerly Infogrames. The MicroProse brand was licensed to the Legacy Engineering Group for consumer electronics. Cybergun owned the MicroProse brand from 2010 to 2018, which was then acquired by David Lagettie working with Stealey.

== History ==
=== Independent company (1982–1993) ===
==== 1980s ====
In summer 1982, mutual friends who knew of their shared interest in aviation arranged for retired military pilot Bill Stealey and computer programmer Sid Meier to meet in Las Vegas. After Meier surprised Stealey by repeatedly defeating him when playing Red Baron, he explained that he had analyzed the game's programming to predict future actions and claimed that he could design a better home computer game in one week. Stealey promised to sell the game if Meier could develop it. Although Meier needed two months to produce Hellcat Ace, Stealey sold 50 copies in his first sales appointment and the game became the first product of their new company. They planned to name it Smugger's Software, but chose MicroProse. (In 1987 the company agreed to change its name to avoid confusion with MicroPro International, but MicroPro decided to rename itself after its WordStar word processor). MicroProse became profitable in its second month and had $10 million in sales by 1986.

MicroProse advertised its first batch of games in 1982, under the headline "Experience the MicroProse Challenge!!!" All three were written by Sid Meier for the Atari 8-bit computers: platform game Floyd of the Jungle, 2D shooter Chopper Rescue, and first-person airplane combat game Hellcat Ace. Hellcat Ace began a series of increasingly sophisticated 8-bit flight simulation games, including Spitfire Ace (1982) and Solo Flight (1983), that defined the company.

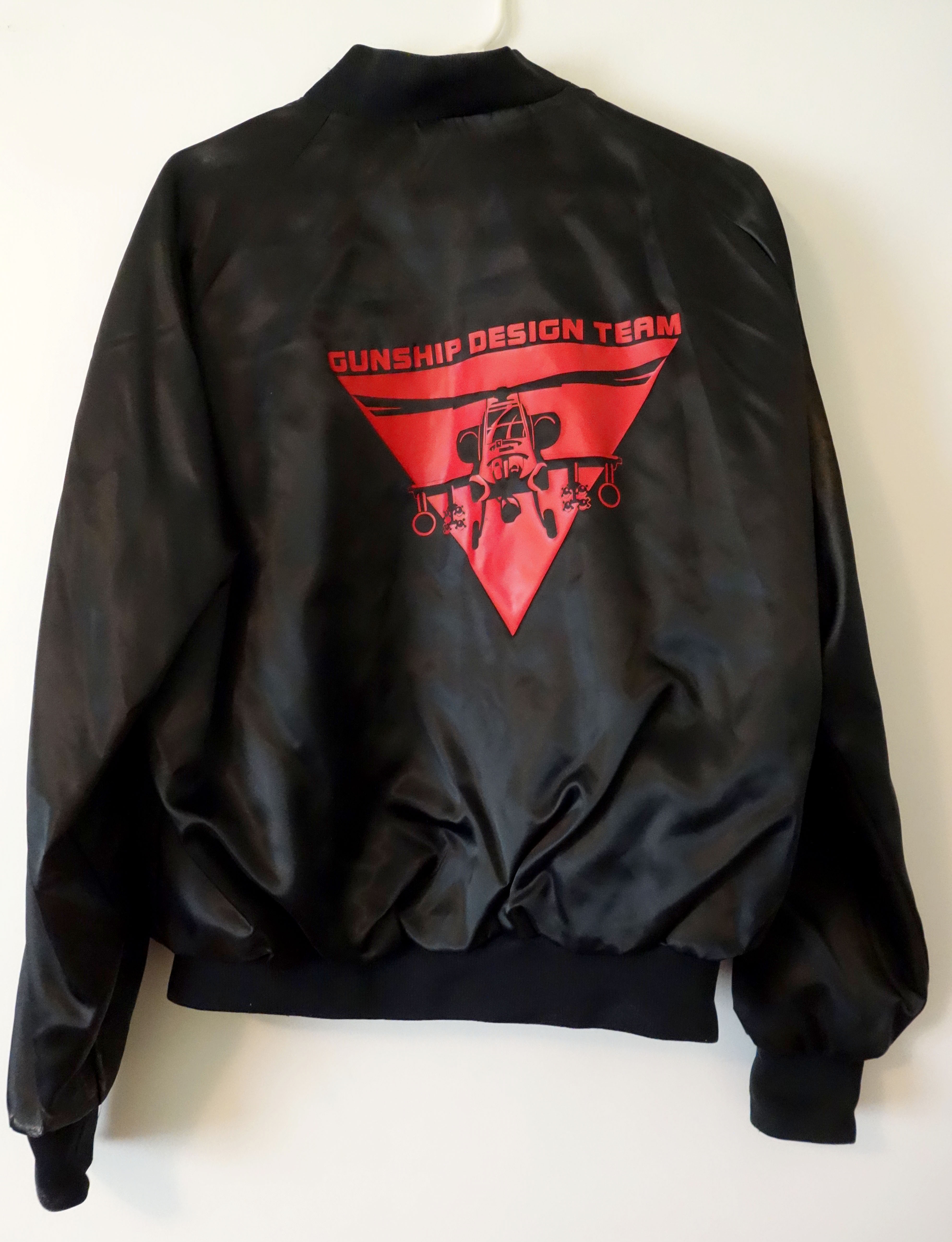
Gregg Tavares's Gunship Design Team flight jacket

In 1983, MicroProse ported Floyd of the Jungle to the Commodore 64, its first product for that machine. By 1984, the company had begun supporting the Apple II and IBM PC compatibles. MicroProse released the air traffic control game Kennedy Approach, written by Andy Hollis, in 1985. Conflict in Vietnam (1986) was MicroProse's final Atari 8-bit game.

By 1987, Computer Gaming World considered MicroProse one of the top five computer game companies, alongside likes of Activision and Electronic Arts.

MicroProse also started a branch in the United Kingdom to cross-publish titles in Europe, and to import some European titles to be published in the United States. The company had headquarters in Stroud/Chipping Sodbury and Manchester. Notable products from this period include simulation games F-15 Strike Eagle, F-19 Stealth Fighter, Gunship, Project Stealth Fighter, Red Storm Rising and Silent Service, and action-strategy games such as Sid Meier's Pirates! and Sword of the Samurai. Several games from different developers were also published by MicroProse under the labels "Firebird" and "Rainbird" (acquired after buying Telecomsoft in May 1989), including Mr. Heli, Midwinter and Core Design's Rick Dangerous. During the same period, MicroProse created two labels: MicroStyle (UK), and MicroPlay Software (US), using them for publishing a variety of externally developed games, such as Challenge of the Five Realms, Command HQ, Global Conquest, Elite Plus, Flames of Freedom, Rick Dangerous, Stunt Car Racer, Xenophobe and XF5700 Mantis. By the late 1980s, the company maintained a division, Medialist International, in order to distribute and develop independent titles that was published through the MicroPlay and MicroProse labels. Also, Medialist Software Group, a distribution division of MicroProse, expanded its program, by obtaining distribution rights to third-party titles through affiliated companies like Paragon Software.

==== 1990s ====
In the early 1990s, MicroProse released the strategy games Sid Meier's Railroad Tycoon and Sid Meier's Civilization, designed by Meier and developed by its internal division, MPS Labs, on multiple platforms. Critically acclaimed, both of them quickly became two of the bestselling strategy games of all time and spawned multiple sequels. Some of MicroProse's simulation games from the 1980s received remakes in the early 1990s, such as Night Hawk: F-117A Stealth Fighter 2.0, Silent Service II and Gunship 2000, and made some first cautious attempts to expand into the console market with F-117A Stealth Fighter and Super Strike Eagle (MicroProse also ported several of its titles to the 16- and 32-bit consoles during the mid-1990s). Brand new simulation and strategy titles included 1942: The Pacific Air War, Dogfight, Fields of Glory, Formula One Grand Prix, Harrier Jump Jet, Knights of the Sky, Starlord, Subwar 2050 and Task Force 1942.

MicroProse attempted to diversify beyond its niche roots as a sim and strategy game company, looking for opportunities into the arcade game industry. MicroProse designed further action-strategy titles such as Covert Action (also designed by Sid Meier) and Hyperspeed, and experimented with the role-playing genre by developing BloodNet and Darklands (in addition to publishing The Legacy: Realm of Terror). The company invested a large sum of money to create its arcade game division as well as its own graphic adventure game engine. Meier felt that Stealey was taking the company in a risky direction, and the two could not work out their differences. Meier opted to quietly sell Stealey his share of the company but remained on in the same apparent role for all other purposes to the rest of the staff and their customers to allow Stealey to proceed in this direction.

The arcade division did not perform well, and was canceled after making only two games: F-15 Strike Eagle: The Arcade Game and Battle of the Solar System (both of which featured high-end 3D graphics but failed to become popular as they were too different from existing machines), while the adventure game engine was used for just three games: Rex Nebular and the Cosmic Gender Bender, Return of the Phantom and Dragonsphere, before it was sold off to Sanctuary Woods.

In August 1991, MicroProse filed for an initial public offering. The company hoped to raise $18 million to help repay debts from its unsuccessful arcade games. In 1992, after Spectrum HoloByte's original distributor Mirrorsoft went under, MicroProse acquired the European distribution rights to its titles of Spectrum HoloByte. In 1992 MicroProse acquired Paragon Software, and it was renamed to MicroProse Greensburg. It also acquired Leeds-based flight simulation developer Vektor Grafix, which had already developed titles for it (such as B-17 Flying Fortress), turning it into a satellite development studio named MicroProse Leeds. In 1993, its Greensburg development unit was spun-off into Take-Two Interactive. Subsequently, MicroProse would sell the Amiga and Macintosh rights to BloodNet and Master of Orion, among other games to Take-Two Interactive in 1994.

=== Under Spectrum HoloByte (1993–1998) ===
In December 1993, following Black Wednesday in the UK, MicroProse Software Inc. merged with Spectrum HoloByte, another game company that specialized in simulation games, to form MicroProse Inc. Bill Stealey, who was good friends with Spectrum HoloByte president Gilman Louie, convinced Louie to help MicroProse as Stealey was afraid that some bank would not understand the company culture. MicroProse UK was forced to close its two satellite studios of MicroProse in northern England and dispose of over 40 staff at its Chipping Sodbury head office (Microprose Chipping Sodbury). A core group of artists, designers, and programmers left MicroProse UK to join Psygnosis, which opened an office in Stroud specifically to attract ex-MicroProse employees. In 1994, the company had bought out Shadowmasters, a studio led by William F. Denman Jr., and it was transitioned into MicroProse Chapel Hill. In 1994, Stealey departed MicroProse and Spectrum HoloByte agreed to buy out his shares. He later commented, "Spectrum Holobyte had a lot of cash and very few products. Microprose had a lot of products and no cash. It was a great marriage, but the new company only needed one chairman, so I resigned." Stealey went on to found an independent game company Interactive Magic (also specializing in vehicle simulators and strategy games), while Andy Hollis departed for Origin Systems, and Sandy Petersen joined id Software.

Spectrum Holobyte managed to line up licenses, including Top Gun (Top Gun: Fire At Will), Magic: The Gathering (Magic: The Gathering), Star Trek: The Next Generation (A Final Unity, Birth of the Federation, Klingon Honor Guard) and MechWarrior (MechCommander, MechWarrior 3). Strategy game UFO: Enemy Unknown proved to be an unanticipated hit in 1994, spawning multiple sequels. In 1996, Spectrum HoloByte/MicroProse bought out Simtex, earlier a developer of MicroProse-published bestsellers Master of Orion and Master of Magic. Simtex was re-branded as MicroProse Texas (Master of Orion II: Battle at Antares), based in Austin, Texas. Other MicroProse developed and/or published games during that period included 7th Legion, Addiction Pinball, AEGIS: Guardian of the Fleet, Civilization II, Dark Earth, F-15 Strike Eagle III, Fleet Defender, Grand Prix 2, Pizza Tycoon, Sid Meier's Colonization, Tinhead, Transport Tycoon, X-COM: Apocalypse, X-COM: Interceptor and X-COM: Terror from the Deep. Insufficient financial resources largely prevented MicroProse from developing games for other game platforms, therefore MicroProse concentrated on the PC game market.

MicroProse Software continued as separate subsidiary company under Spectrum HoloByte until 1996. That year, Spectrum HoloByte started cutting a majority of the MicroProse staff to reduce costs. Soon after, it consolidated all of its titles under the MicroProse brand (essentially renaming itself MicroProse). MicroProse's remaining co-founder Sid Meier, along with Jeff Briggs and Brian Reynolds, departed the company after the staff cut, forming a new company named Firaxis Games.

On October 5, 1997, GT Interactive announced that it had signed a definitive agreement to acquire MicroProse for $250 million in stock. The deal was unanimously approved by the Board of Directors of both companies. After the announcement MicroProse's stock price reached $7 a share. GT Interactive expected the deal to be completed by the end of that year. The acquisition was canceled on December 5, as according to both CEOs "the time is simply not right" for the deal. MicroProse's stock plummeted to just $2.31 after the announcement of the deal's cancellation, and the company had estimated losses of $7–10 million during the third quarter of 1997 which are largely attributed to dislocations caused by the aborted merger. According to Computer Gaming World, the merger was annulled due to a "fundamental" disagreement over how the joint company would be writing off its research and development costs, as MicroProse insisted to keep its method of paying off the developer immediately.

In November 1997, MicroProse was sued by both Avalon Hill (who had the U.S. publishing rights to the name Civilization) and Activision for copyright infringement. MicroProse responded by buying Hartland Trefoil, which was the original designer and manufacturer of the Civilization board game, and then sued Avalon Hill and Activision for trademark infringement and unfair business practices as a result of Activision's decision to develop and publish Civilization video games. Because Hasbro was negotiating the acquisition of both Avalon Hill and MicroProse, the lawsuits were settled in July 1998. Under the terms of the settlement MicroProse became the sole owner of the rights of the name Civilization and Activision acquired a license to publish a Civilization video game which was later titled Civilization: Call to Power.

=== Under Hasbro Interactive (1998–2001) ===
In preparation for its sale, MicroProse closed down its studio in Austin in June 1998; as a result of the closure, 35 employees lost their jobs. On August 14, 1998, Hasbro issued a $70 million cash tender offer to purchase all MicroProse's shares for $6 each. This deal was completed on September 14, when Hasbro bought 91% of MicroProse's shares and announced that MicroProse had become a wholly owned subsidiary. The remaining shares would also be acquired for $6 in cash. MicroProse was merged with Hasbro Interactive. At the time of Hasbro's acquisition, MicroProse had 343 employees, including 135 at Alameda, California (MicroProse Alameda), with a total operating cost of $20 million per year. Besides the development studio in Alameda, MicroProse had three other studios: Hunt Valley, Maryland (Microprose, Hunt Valley); Chapel Hill, North Carolina; and Chipping Sodbury, England.

In December 1998, MicroProse finally managed to publish Falcon 4.0 (in development by Spectrum HoloByte since 1992), to disappointing sales. In December 1999, Hasbro Interactive closed down former MicroProse studios in Alameda and Chapel Hill. Among titles in development that got canceled during that period was X-COM: Genesis. The last MicroProse developed game under Hasbro, B-17 Flying Fortress: The Mighty 8th, was published in 2000.

=== Under Infogrames (2001–2003) ===
On December 6, 2000, amidst struggling sales and restructurings, Hasbro announced it would entirely sell off Hasbro Interactive, including MicroProse's assets, to French holding company Infogrames Entertainment SA for $100 million, $95 million as 4.5 million common shares of Infogrames and $5 million in cash. The deal was closed on January 29, 2001 with Hasbro Interactive, Inc. being renamed as Infogrames Interactive, Inc.

After the sale, sales and distribution of MicroProse titles transitioned to Infogrames, Inc. in North America and the company's standalone international divisions everywhere else. By this time, the company began a slow phase-out of the brand with many MicroProse branded titles previously released by Hasbro being reissued with Infogrames' logo on the packaging. MicroProse's two remaining development studios in Chipping Sodbury and Hunt Valley were rebranded under the Infogrames banner as well, becoming Infogrames Interactive Chippenham Studio and Infogrames Interactive Hunt Valley Studio, respectively. The development of X-COM: Alliance was finally aborted in 2002 without a formal announcement.

The final newly released games released under the MicroProse brand name were X-COM: Enforcer, released in April 2001, Tactical Ops: Assault on Terror, released in April 2002, and Grand Prix 4, released in June 2002. In September, Infogrames shuttered the Chippenham studio and aborting the development of an Xbox port of Grand Prix 4 that had been currently worked at in the studio within the process.

The Hunt Valley studio worked on Monopoly Casino: Vegas Edition for the PC, and then focused on the development of the Xbox title Dungeons & Dragons: Heroes, which was released in October 2003. Earlier on in May, Infogrames rebranded all its subsidiaries under the Atari brand; including Infogrames, Inc. becoming Atari, Inc., and Infogrames Interactive, Inc. becoming Atari Interactive, Inc. In November 2003, Atari announced the closure of the Hunt Valley studio, which itself was the last MicroProse studio still operating. However, several game developers now exist in the area, including Firaxis Games and BreakAway Games, who all owe their origin to MicroProse.

=== Brand sale to Interactive Game Group and Cybergun Group (2007–2019) ===
In 2007, the MicroProse brand name was sold by Atari Interactive to the Interactive Game Group, a producer of video game titles. The company filed for transfer of trademark protection on December 12, 2007. Originally, it was unclear if MicroProse's titles and intellectual properties were also acquired by the Interactive Game Group from Atari/Infogrames, but was soon confirmed that the latter had remained the owners of the properties.

In January 2008, the Interactive Game Group sub-licensed the MicroProse brand and trademark to I-Drs At in January 2008. The company also licensed the MicroProse brand to the Legacy Engineering Group (LEG), which used the license to form subsidiaries called Microprose Systems and Microprose Consumer Electronics Division, selling consumer electronics from February 2008 to the second half of 2008. In October, the licensing agreement between LEG and Frederic Chesnais, owner of Interactive Game Group, was discontinued, forcing LEG to rebrand its subsidiaries to Legacy Consumer Electronics.

In 2010, the Cybergun Group, manufacturer of airsoft gun products, merged with the Interactive Game Group, acquiring the MicroProse brand within the merger. In 2011, the Interactive Game Group was rebranded under the MicroProse name and began licensing and executive producing various casual and budget video game titles that the Interactive Game Group had already licensed including Jaws: Ultimate Predator and fitness games featuring Jillian Michaels. In August 2012, MicroProse announced that it would re-partner with its former owner Atari to release Special Forces: Team X for 2013. The MicroProse brand continued in use until the end of 2013, when its domain lapsed and the brand fell into dormancy.

On July 22, 2013, during the Atari bankruptcy sale, most of MicroProse's former IPs that remained with the publisher were sold to Tommo. In October 2014, Tommo announced the launch of the "Retroism" brand and re-released a majority of MicroProse's catalogue through digital media platforms such as Steam.

=== Brand revival (2018–present) ===
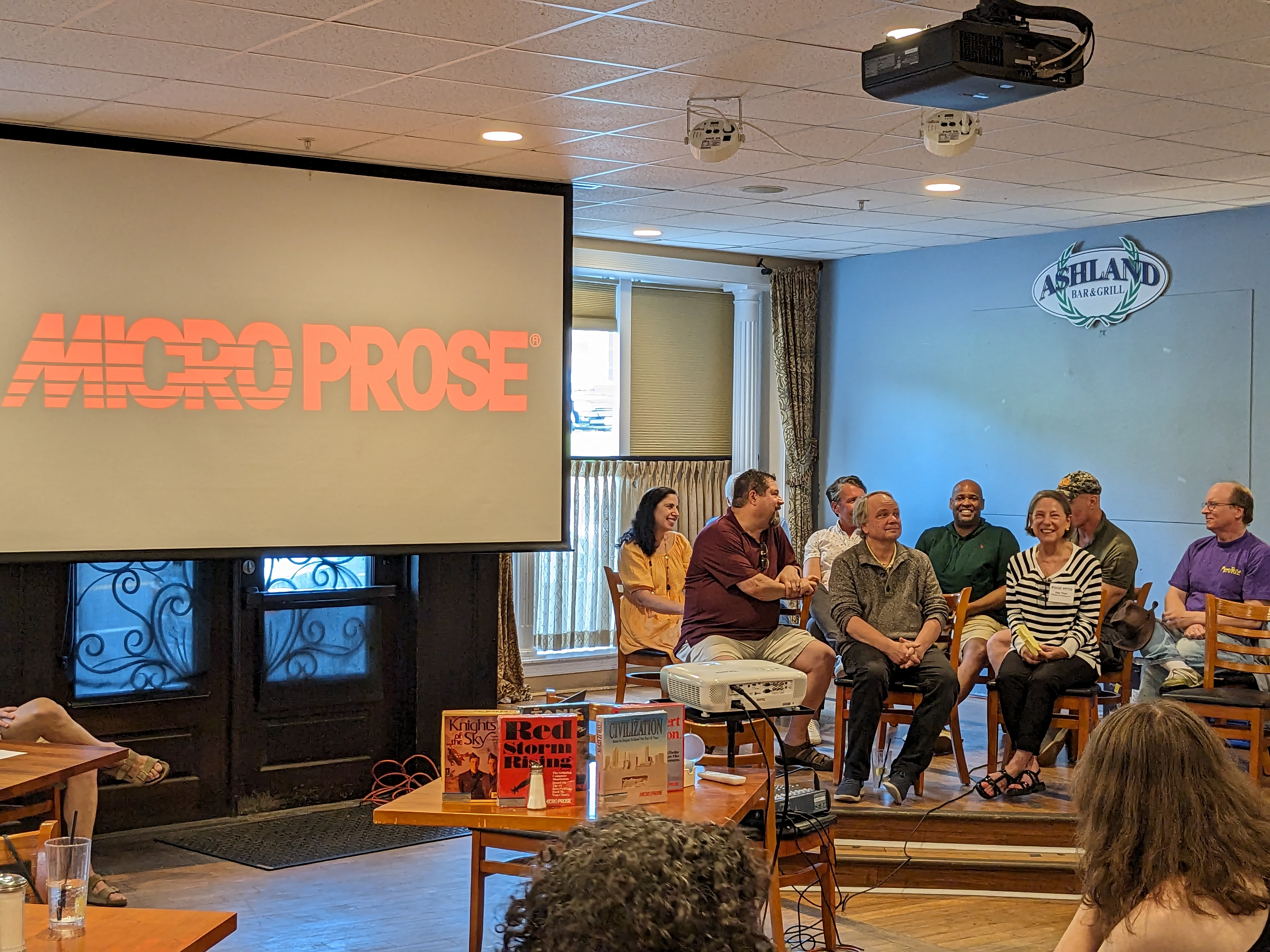
MicroProse reunion, July 2023, hosted by the Baltimore chapter of the International Game Developers Association (IGDA)

In 2018, David Lagettie, an Australian simulation software entrepreneur and one of the makers of TitanIM open world military simulation software, purchased the MicroProse brand from the Cybergun Group. Lagettie was a former developer for Bohemia Interactive at its Australian studios before starting his own company to create video game simulators to be used by military groups. Lagettie had been a fan of the original MicroProse games growing up, and as he saw the games ownership transition made the company eventually disappear, he started investigating the fate of MicroProse around 2005. When possible, he began buying whatever IP from MicroProse he could, including the name and original logo trademarks. In February 2019, MicroProse was officially revived as a full publisher of video game and simulation titles, working with the iEntertainment Network on the WarBirds series of combat flight simulators. Within the rest of 2019, MicroProse announced Sea Power: Naval Combat in the Missile Age by the developer Triassic Games AB, Task Force Admiral – Vol.1: American Carrier Battles by Drydock Dreams Games, Operation: Harsh Doorstop by Drakeling Labs, and Warfare 1944 by Drakeling Labs. Lagettie's acquisitions drew the attention of Stealey, who subsequently inquired Lagettie about his plans, leading to Stealey joining Lagettie in an unofficial manner in the new MicroProse.

The new company announced in May 2020 the first of three new games to be released for personal computers: Triassic Games' Sea Power, Drydock Dreams' Task Force Admiral, and Hexdraw's Second Front, with about twenty additional titles planned out for publishing in the future. Lagettie said that while the new MicroProse will branch out to other genres such as adventure and racing games, its core portfolio will be centered on combat-based ones. MicroProse re-released B-17 Flying Fortress on Steam in November 2021. In 2022, Microprose announced the purchase of the Outerra game engine, which it said will complete, release, and also use as the engine for some of its future games. On May 4, 2023, the company announced it had re-acquired the copyright to the Falcon series. On December 17, 2025, it was announced that MicroProse had reunited with Geoff Crammond for an updated rerelease of all four Grand Prix games, set for release on Steam in 2026.

== Games ==
Games by MicroProse include Civilization (1991), Civilization II (1996), Darklands (1992), F-15 Strike Eagle (1985), F-19 Stealth Fighter (1988), Formula One Grand Prix (1992), Grand Prix 2 (1995), Grand Prix World (1999), Ground Branch (2018), Gunship (1986), Lightspeed (1990), M1 Tank Platoon (1989), Master of Magic (1994), Master of Orion (1993), Master of Orion II (1996), Midwinter (1989), Pirates! (1987), Project Stealth Fighter (1987), Railroad Tycoon (1990), Red Storm Rising (1988), Silent Service (1985), and UFO: Enemy Unknown (1994).

== Legacy ==
It was a great run. We should've done better. We had great people.
I think all our people are still very proud of their MicroProse days.

— Bill Stealey in 2013

Sid Meier, who now works at Firaxis Games, eventually got the rights of most of his games back under his control from Atari Inc. The Railroad Tycoon series rights were sold to PopTop Software, who developed Railroad Tycoon II and Railroad Tycoon 3. Eventually, Poptop was acquired by Take-Two Interactive, which later also acquired Firaxis as well, thus returning the rights to the series to Meier, resulting in Sid Meier's Railroads!, released by Take-Two's 2K Games along with a new Sid Meier's Pirates! and the new Civilization games, including Sid Meier's Civilization III, Sid Meier's Civilization IV, Sid Meier's Civilization V, Sid Meier's Civilization IV: Colonization and Sid Meier's Civilization Revolution. Firaxis Games also developed the X-COM series' reboot XCOM: Enemy Unknown, which was followed by 2K Marin's spin-off The Bureau: XCOM Declassified.

Master of Orion III was developed by Quicksilver Software and released under the Infogrames label. Falcon 4.0 rights were sold to Graphsim Entertainment, who developed Falcon 4.0: Allied Force.
