= Mirrorsoft =

British video game publisher, 1983–1992

- Logo used from 1986 to 1990
- Type: Division
- Industry: Video games
- Founded: 1983; 43 years ago
- Founder: Jim Mackonochie
- Defunct: 1992
- Fate: Administration
- Parent: Mirror Group Newspapers

Mirrorsoft was a British video game publisher founded by Jim Mackonochie as a division of Mirror Group Newspapers. The company was active between 1983 and 1991, and shut down completely in early 1992.

== History ==
In the early 1980s, Jim Mackonochie worked as development manager for British communications company Mirror Group Newspapers. On a trip to the U.S., Mackonochie got hold of a Commodore PET personal computer, alongside a copy of VisiCalc, a spreadsheet application for the system. This combination led him to believe that Mirror, as a communications company, should be working more closely with computer software, wherefore he approached Mirror's board of directors in 1983, suggesting that they launch a software label under Mirror Group's name, and thereby diversifying the group's non-newspaper operations, which already included Mirror Boats and Mirror Books. The division, named Mirrorsoft, was officially launched in late 1983, and Mackonochie was allowed to task several of his staff from his department at Mirror Group to aid him with establishing the division.

In July 1984, Mirror Group was acquired by Robert Maxwell-owned Maxwell Communications. Initially, Mirrorsoft was unaffected by the ownership change, until Mackonochie received a call from Maxwell's son, Kevin, on Boxing Day 1984, in which he was told that he would be permanently moved from development manager of Mirror Group to full-time managing director of Mirrorsoft.

In 1986, Mirrorsoft released a desktop publishing program, Fleet Street Publisher, for Atari ST. In 1987, the company begin distributing titles by Spectrum HoloByte in Europe, while Spectrum HoloByte begin distributing most of Mirrorsoft's titles in North America. The company also acquired Personal Software Services and repurposed it into a label for videogames. The company later scored a hit with Tetris in the European market. The company later launched the labels the labels Image Works (original games) in 1988, PSS (strategy games, after acquisition of the former Personal Software Services in 1987) and Mirror Image (for re-releases at budget price) in 1991.

In early 1991, Mirrorsoft partnered with Konami to distribute titles for the North American market under the joint label, Konami/Image Works. In April 1991, the company launched a joint venture with distributor Spectrum HoloByte, who was a sister company to Mirrorsoft, as both companies was owned by Mirror Group, to launch a North American-centric label, Arena Entertainment, being run by the staff of HoloByte. The company later bought the assets of Cinemaware in 1991 at a bankruptcy auction.

On 5 November 1991, Robert Maxwell died after having previously disappeared from his yacht. Unaware of his fate, Mirrorsoft continued operations as usual, including the publishing of First Samurai, Mega-Lo-Mania and Teenage Mutant Hero Turtles: The Coin-Op through Image Works and good projections for Christmas sales, but subsequent to Maxwell's death, Maxwell Communications declared bankruptcy in 1992. Arthur Andersen was appointed administrator for Maxwell's companies, including Mirrorsoft, near the end of November. With the arrival of the administrators, they took over all day-to-day operations at the company, and shut down all Mirrorsoft sales, the division's only source of revenue. Several visits from potential buyers, including Infogrames and MicroProse, were arranged hastily, and a management buyout was considered, but the easiest option was found to be closing the company down and selling off its assets. The majority of Mirrorsoft's staff was laid off on New Year's Eve 1991, with a remaining few being kept for further 1–2 months to help with winding down the company. Several business assets were subsequently sold to Acclaim Entertainment, including the Arena label, which bought the other half of the Arena label from Spectrum HoloByte. The Cinemaware brand was transferred to Mindscape, and the European distribution rights to Spectrum HoloByte's titles went to MicroProse Software.

After the decline of Acclaim in 2004, Throwback Entertainment purchased some of Acclaim's catalogue, and in 2020, Throwback Entertainment relaunched Mirrorsoft as MIRROR Soft, releasing back catalogue titles.

== List of games ==
- First Steps with the Mr. Men, 1983
- Caesar the Cat, 1983
- Quick Thinking, 1983
- Mastermind, 1984
- Mastermind Quizmaster, 1984
- The Joffe Plan, 1984
- Know Your Own Personality, 1984
- Know Your Own Psi-Q, 1984
- Star Seeker, 1984
- Word Games with the Mr. Men, 1984
- Here and There with the Mr. Men, 1985
- Caesar's Travels, 1985
- 737 Flight Simulator, 1985
- Ashkeron!, 1985
- Boulder Dash, 1985 (UK distribution, Atari 8-Bit and Amstrad CPC versions)
- Dynamite Dan, 1985
- Mr. Men Magic Storymaker, 1985
- The Invisible Mr. Men, 1985
- Spitfire 40, 1985
- Dynamite Dan II, 1986
- Sai Combat, 1986
- Biggles, 1986
- Strike Force Harrier, 1986
- Zythum, 1986
- Bismarck, 1987
- Pegasus Bridge, 1987
- Sorcerer Lord, 1987
- Tobruk, 1987
- Zig Zag, 1987
- Legend of the Sword, 1988
- Intrigue!, 1988
- Tetris, 1988
- Firezone, 1988
- Austerlitz, 1989
- Conflict: Europe, 1989
- Falcon, 1989
- Final Frontier, 1989 (Note: Unrelated to the 1989 DOS game Star Trek V: The Final Frontier.)
- Waterloo, 1989
- Battle Master, 1990
- Speedball 2: Brutal Deluxe, 1990
- The Final Battle, 1990
- Champion of the Raj, 1991
- J. R. R. Tolkien's Riders of Rohan, 1991

== See also ==
- Personal Software Services
- Image Works
- Throwback Entertainment
