= Battlefield Germany =

1987 video game

- ZX Spectrum cover art
- Developer(s): Personal Software Services
- Publisher(s): Personal Software Services
- Series: Strategic Wargames
- Platform(s): Commodore 64, Amstrad CPC, ZX Spectrum
- Release: UK: April 1987
- Genre(s): Turn-based strategy
- Mode(s): Single-player

Battlefield Germany is a turn-based strategy video game developed and published by Personal Software Services for the Commodore 64 released in April 1987. It was also ported to the Amstrad CPC and ZX Spectrum later that year. The game is set during a fictional scenario in which the powers of NATO and the Warsaw Pact engage in a conventional war throughout Europe, mostly centring in West and East Germany.

The game is a turn-based strategy and focuses on the player building and training units that are used to attack the opposing side. The game was released for 8-bit consoles as well as 16-bit consoles. Battlefield Germany received mixed reviews upon release. Reviewers mainly criticised the tempo of the gameplay and lack of innovation from the original. Some critics, however, praised the graphics and viewed the hard difficulty favourably.

== Gameplay ==
A still image of gameplay. Red sprites represent units belonging to the Warsaw Pact whereas blue units belong to NATO forces

The game is a turn-based strategy and revolves around a fictional conflict between the powers of NATO and the Warsaw Pact. The player has the choice of choosing to control either NATO or Warsaw Pact forces at the beginning of the game. The player will begin the game on either side of Europe depending on which side was chosen; if NATO was picked, the player will start at western European countries (France, West Germany, Denmark) whereas if the player sides with the Warsaw Pact, the game will begin in eastern Europe. The map is hexagon-shaped and allows the player to move their units in six directions. Each side has a variety of units; infantry move at a slower pace than mechanised infantry however armoured units are able to withstand more damage than regular units. The game displays two maps on screen; the larger, central map displays the current situation whereas a smaller map to the corner of the screen displays a mini-map of Europe, which runs north from Denmark to southern France.

There are seven types of units in the game. Each unit has a set of statistics which is displayed in the interface once selected. The statistics range from combat strength, fatigue, efficiency, supply and movement points. During the game, both sides have the option to request air support that can be used to attack enemy units. If the other side uses their air support, the player will be given a warning of an oncoming air strike and will have the option to retreat. The game has two endings depending on the side chosen. If playing as NATO, the main objective is to stall Soviet forces long enough until American reinforcements arrive. However, if playing as the Warsaw Pact, the objective is to destroy all NATO forces.

== Setting ==
The events leading up the stand-off between NATO and the Warsaw Pact are detailed in a pre-game text; Iran declares war on Iraq and subsequently invades the latter nation, whilst Egypt succumbs to a civil war and establishes Islamic law over the country, culminating in an Egyptian invasion of Israel. The events in the Middle East prompt the superpowers of the United States and the British Empire to intervene, leading up to a conventional war in Europe against the Eastern bloc. The game is set in 1987.

== Reception ==
Reception

Review scores
Publication	Score
Crash	42%
Your Sinclair	9/10
Computer Gamer	56%

The game received mixed reviews upon release. Richard Blaine of Your Sinclair praised the graphics as "wonderful" and the gameplay as "tough", adding that the game should be aimed at advanced players. Philippa Irving of Crash criticised the graphics as repetitively "dull", despite admitting that they were "clear enough" visually. Gary Rook of Sinclair User heralded the graphics as "superb", adding that the game was one of the "best looking" wargames he had ever seen at that time. A reviewer of Computer and Video Games criticised the presentation, stating that the screen was too small and the lack of visual understanding made the game "completely unplayable". Mark Reed of Computer Gamer praised the graphics as being superior compared to Theatre Europe, heralding it as "much more detailed". However, Reed criticised the originality of the game and the lack of manual for the ZX Spectrum version.

A reviewer of ZX Computing praised the game's difficulty, suggesting that it was "recommended" for advanced gamers in the wargame genre. Irving criticised the game's value for money and playability, stating that £12.95 was "a lot" of money to spend on a game that the player would most likely dislike. However, Rook heralded the gameplay as "smooth" and "challenging", contrary to other critics.
