= Golden Joystick Awards =

Annual video game award ceremony

- Awarded for: Outstanding achievements in the video game industry
- Country: United Kingdom
- First award: 1983; 43 years ago
- Website: goldenjoystick.com

Graphic of the trophy

The Golden Joystick Awards, also known as the People's Gaming Awards, is an annual video game awards ceremony; it rewards the best video games of the year. Although originally solely voted for by the British public, it is now a global event that is voted for online by millions of fans worldwide via GamesRadar+. Launched in 1983, the Golden Joystick Awards is the longest-running and one of the biggest public-voted video game award shows.

The awards were initially focused on PC games, but were extended to include console games. The ceremony is not directly related to the golden joystick prize awarded to successful contestants on GamesMaster, a British television show, but both properties belong to Future plc.

== Winners ==
=== 1983 ===
Awards were presented by DJ Dave Lee Travis at a ceremony in London's Berkeley Square.

Award	Winner	Runners-up
Game of the Year	Jetpac	Arcadia, Manic Miner, The Hobbit
Best Arcade-Style Game of the Year	Manic Miner	Arcadia, Penetrator, Zalaga
Strategy Game of the Year	The Hobbit	Football Manager, Planet Invasion, Scrabble
Best Original Game of the Year	Ah Diddums	Ant Attack, Pssst, Splat!
Software House of the Year	Ultimate Play the Game	Imagine Software, Llamasoft, Melbourne House

=== 1984 ===
Awards were presented by Jools Holland, at a ceremony in London.

Award	Winner	Runner-Up	Commended
Game of the Year	Knight Lore	Ghostbusters	Avalon, Impossible Mission
Software House of the Year	Ultimate Play the Game	Beyond Software	Hewson Consultants, Mikro-Gen
Best Original Game of the Year	Elite	Deus Ex Machina	Ancipital, Pyjamarama
Best Adventure Game of the Year	Claymorgue Castle	Erik the Viking	Eureka, Tir Na Nog
Best Strategy Game of the Year	Lords of Midnight	Beach Head	NATO Commander, Battle for Midway
Best Arcade-Style Game of the Year	Daley Thompson's Decathlon	Boulderdash	Wanted: Monty Mole, 3D Starstrike
Best Programmer of the Year	Ultimate Team	Mike Singleton	Tony Crowther, Acornsoft

=== 1985 ===
Awards were presented by Jools Holland, at a ceremony on a Thames Riverboat.

Award	Winner	Runners-up
Game of the Year	The Way of the Exploding Fist	Elite, Summer Games II
Software House of the Year	Melbourne House	U.S. Gold, Elite Systems, Firebird Software
Best Original Game of the Year	Little Computer People	Spy vs. Spy, Paradroid
Adventure Game of the Year	Red Moon	Gremlins, Bored of the Rings
Strategy Game of the Year	Theatre Europe	Shadowfire, Battle of Britain
Arcade-Style Game of the Year	Commando	Hyper Sports, Dropzone
Programmer of the Year	Stephen Crow	Jeff Minter, Andrew Braybrook, Bo Jangeborg

=== 1986 ===
The ceremony took place at Cadogan Hall.

Award	Winner	Runners-up
Game of the Year	Gauntlet	Uridium, Space Harrier
Software House of the Year	Elite Systems	U.S. Gold, Hewson Consultants
Best Original Game of the Year	The Sentinel	Trap Door, Trivial Pursuit
Adventure Game of the Year	The Pawn	Lord of the Rings, Heavy on the Magick
Strategy Game of the Year	Nam (Vietnam)	Johnny Reb II, Silent Service
Arcade-Style Game of the Year	Uridium	Gauntlet, Ghosts'n Goblins
Programmer of the Year	Andrew Braybrook	Chris Butler, Stephen Crow
Best Soundtrack of the Year	Sanxion	Knucklebusters, Starglider

=== 1987 ===
Awards were presented by Chris Tarrant.

Award	Winner	Runners-up
Game of the Year	Out Run	The Last Ninja, Renegade
Software House of the Year	U.S. Gold	Ocean Software, Elite Systems
Best Original Game of the Year	Nebulus	Wizball, Driller
Arcade Game of the Year	Out Run	Renegade, Bubble Bobble
Adventure Game of the Year	The Guild of Thieves	Knight Orc, Shadows of Mordor
Strategy Game of the Year	Vulcan	Defender of the Crown, Annals of Rome
Programmer of the Year	Jon Ritman	Andrew Braybrook

=== 1988 ===
The ceremony took place at Kensington Roof Gardens.

Award	Winner (8-bit)	Winner (16-bit)	Runners-up
Computer Game of the Year	Operation Wolf	Speedball	Last Ninja 2, Starglider 2
Console Game of the Year	Thunder Blade (Master System)		R-Type (PC Engine)
Best Graphics of the Year	Armalyte	Rocket Ranger	Last Ninja 2, Starglider 2
Best Soundtrack of the Year	Bionic Commando	International Karate +	RoboCop, Starglider 2
Best Simulation Game of the Year	Microprose Soccer	Falcon	Project Stealth Fighter, F/A-18 Interceptor
Adventure Game of the Year	Corruption	Fish!	Ingrid's Back
Best Coin-Op Conversion of the Year	Operation Wolf	Operation Wolf	R-Type, Pac-Mania
Software House of the Year	Ocean Software	Mirrorsoft	U.S. Gold
Programmer of the Year	John Phillips	The Bitmap Brothers	Mev Dink, John Twiddy

=== 1989 ===
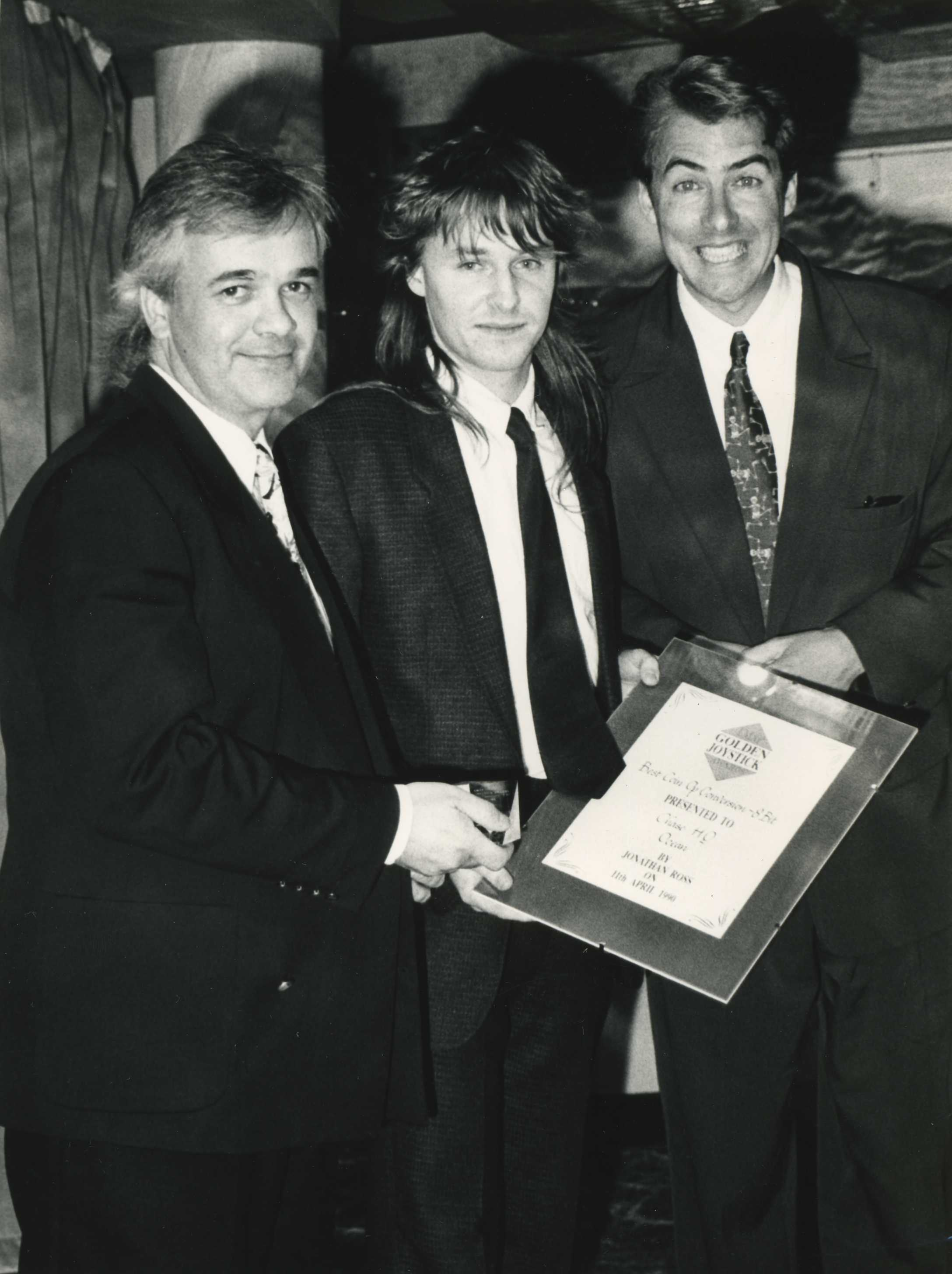
1989/1990: Paul Patterson of Ocean Software receives, from Jonathan Ross and Julian Rignall, "Best Coin-Op Conversion of the Year" (8-bit) award.

The ceremony took place at Kensington Roof Gardens, 11 April 1990.

Award	Winner (8-bit)	Winner (16-bit)
Game of the Year	The Untouchables	Kick Off
Best Graphics of the Year	Myth	Shadow of the Beast
Best Soundtrack of the Year	Chase H.Q.	Future Wars
Best Simulation Game of the Year	Carrier Command	M1 Tank Platoon
Best Coin-Op Conversion of the Year	Chase H.Q.	Hard Drivin'
PC Leisure Product of the Year	Indiana Jones and the Last Crusade: The Graphic Adventure	
Most Original Game of the Year	Populous	
Software House of the Year	Ocean Software	

=== 1990 ===
The ceremony took place at Kensington Roof Gardens, 4 April 1991.

Award	Winner (8-bit)	Winner (16-bit)
Computer Game of the Year	Rick Dangerous 2	Kick Off 2
Console Game of the Year	Mega Man (Nintendo Entertainment System)	John Madden American Football (Mega Drive)
Best Graphics of the Year	Midnight Resistance	Shadow of the Beast 2
Best Soundtrack of the Year	RoboCop 2	Speedball 2
Best Simulation Game of the Year	F19 Stealth Fighter	F19 Stealth Fighter
Best Coin-Op Conversion of the Year	Rainbow Islands	Golden Axe
PC Game of the Year	Railroad Tycoon	
Hardware Manufacturer of the Year	Sega	
Software House of the Year	Ocean Software	

=== 1991 ===
The ceremony took place at Hyde Park Hotel, London, on 7 April 1992.

Award	Winner	Developer
Overall Game of the Year	Sonic the Hedgehog	Sonic Team
16-Bit Computer Game of the Year	Heimdall	Core Design
Best Coin-Op Conversion	Toki	TAD
Best Simulation	Jimmy White's 'Whirlwind' Snooker	Virgin
Best Graphics	Heimdall	Core Design
Best Soundtrack	The Secret of Monkey Island	U.S. Gold
Programmer of the Year	Archer Maclean	
Software House of the Year	Electronic Arts	

=== 1992 ===
The ceremony took place at Kensington, London, in May 1993.

Award	Winner	Platform	Publisher
Game of the Year	Street Fighter II	Super NES	Capcom
Computer Game of the Year	Sensible Soccer	Amiga	Renegade Software
Console Game of the Year	Street Fighter II	Super NES	Capcom
Handheld Game of the Year	Super Kick Off	Game Gear	U.S. Gold
Best Licensed Console Game	Street Fighter II	Super NES	Capcom
Best Licensed Computer Game	Indiana Jones and the Fate of Atlantis	PC	LucasArts
Best Original Console Game	Sonic the Hedgehog 2 (Note: "Best Original Console Game" referred to games without an official license and that were not based on an arcade game, which is why Sonic the Hedgehog 2 was eligible, despite being a sequel.)	Mega Drive	Sega
Best Original Computer Game	Alone in the Dark	PC	Infogrames
Best Console Original Action Game	Desert Strike	Mega Drive	Electronic Arts
Best Computer Simulation	Formula One Grand Prix	PC	Microprose
Promotional Campaign of the Year	Sonic the Hedgehog 2	Mega Drive	Sega
Programming Team of the Year	LucasArts		
Software House of the Year	Electronic Arts		
Software House of the Year	Team17		

=== 1993 ===
The ceremony took place in London, on 16 May 1994.

Award	Winner	Platform
Console Game of the Year	Super Mario All-Stars	Super NES
Hand Held Game of the Year	The Legend of Zelda: Link's Awakening	Game Boy
Best Original Computer Game	Cannon Fodder	Amiga
Best Computer Simulation	TFX	Amiga
Best Advert of the Year	The Legend of Zelda: Link's Awakening	Game Boy
Best Software House	Virgin Interactive	
Best Computer Programmer	Sensible Software	
Services to the Industry	Acclaim Entertainment	

=== 1996/1997 ===
The ceremony took place at Café de Paris, in November 1997.

Award	Winner
Game of the Year	Super Mario 64
PlayStation Plus Best PlayStation Game	Resident Evil
Sega Saturn Magazine Best Saturn Game	Fighters Megamix
Nintendo Magazine Best N64 Game	Super Mario 64
CVG Best PC Game	Quake
Best Looking Game	Super Mario 64
Best Sounding Game	Wipeout 2097
Most Original Game	Parappa the Rapper
Best Ad	Tekken 2
Scoop of the Year	GoldenEye 007
Favourite Game Character	Lara Croft (Tomb Raider)
Best Development Team	Rare
Best Software House	Sony
Best Looking Pages	Sega Saturn Magazine Showcases
Best Review Writer	Ed Lomas, CVG

=== 2002 ===
The 2002 ceremony took place at the Dorchester Hotel on 25 October 2002 and was hosted by Jonathan Ross.

Award	Winner	Runners-up
Game of the Year	Grand Theft Auto III (Rockstar Games)	Halo (Microsoft Studios), Medal of Honor: Allied Assault (EA Games)
Online Game of the Year	Counter-Strike (Valve Corporation)	Medal of Honor: Allied Assault (EA Games), Warcraft III: Reign of Chaos (Blizzard)
PC Game of the Year	Medal of Honor: Allied Assault (EA Games)	Grand Theft Auto III (Rockstar Games), Warcraft III: Reign of Chaos (Blizzard)
Best Use of a Film Licence	The Thing (Vivendi Universal Games/Konami)	Spider-Man (Activision), The Sum of All Fears (Ubi Soft)
Sports Game of the Year	Pro Evolution Soccer (Konami)	Championship Manager (Eidos), FIFA 2002 (EA Sports)
Game Innovation of the Year	Grand Theft Auto III (Rockstar Games)	Max Payne (Rockstar/3D Realms), The D-Day landing in Medal of Honor: Allied Assault (EA Games)
Hardware of the Year	Microsoft Xbox	AMD Athlon XP Processor, Nintendo GameCube
British Developer of the Year	Rockstar North	Electronic Arts
Rare Publisher of the Year	Electronic Arts	Activision/LucasArts, Microsoft Game Studios
Retailer of the Year	Gameplay.com	GAME, Amazon.co.uk
Most Wanted Game for Christmas	Grand Theft Auto: Vice City (Rockstar Games)	Splinter Cell (UbiSoft), Super Mario Sunshine (Nintendo of Europe)
Xbox Game of the Year	Halo (Microsoft Game Studios)	Dead or Alive 3 (Tecmo), Max Payne (Rockstar/3D Realms)
GameCube Game of the Year	Resident Evil (Capcom Eurosoft)	Star Wars Rogue Squadron II: Rogue Leader (Activision/LucasArts), Super Smash Bros. Melee (Nintendo of Europe)
Handheld Game of the Year	Golden Sun (Nintendo)	Mario Kart: Super Circuit (Nintendo), Super Mario World: Super Mario Advance 2 (Nintendo of Europe)
PS2 Game of the Year	Grand Theft Auto III (Rockstar Games)	Final Fantasy X (SCEE), Metal Gear Solid 2: Sons of Liberty (Konami)

=== 2003 ===
The 2003 ceremony took place at the Park Lane Hilton on 28 November 2003 and was hosted by Phill Jupitus.

Award	Winner	Runners-up
PS2 Game of the Year	Grand Theft Auto: Vice City (Rockstar)	EyeToy: Play (SCEE), Pro Evolution Soccer 2 (Konami)
GameCube Game of the Year	The Legend of Zelda: The Wind Waker (Nintendo)	Metroid Prime (Nintendo), Resident Evil Zero (Capcom)
Handheld Game of the Year	Advance Wars 2: Black Hole Rising (Nintendo)	Pokémon Ruby and Sapphire (Nintendo), The Legend of Zelda: A Link to the Past (Nintendo)
Xbox Game of the Year	Star Wars: Knights of the Old Republic (Activision/LucasArts)	Soul Calibur II (Electronic Arts), Tom Clancy's Splinter Cell (Ubisoft)
PC Game of the Year	Championship Manager 4 (Eidos)	Grand Theft Auto: Vice City (Rockstar), Battlefield 1942 (Electronic Arts)
Online Game of the Year	Battlefield 1942 (Electronic Arts)	Phantasy Star Online I & II (Sega), Unreal Championship (Atari)
Film Adaptation of the Year	The Lord of the Rings: The Two Towers (Electronic Arts)	Enter the Matrix (Atari), Harry Potter and the Philosopher's Stone (Electronic Arts)
The Daily Mirror Award: Best of British	Championship Manager 4 (Eidos)	Conflict: Desert Storm II (SCi), Republic: The Revolution (Eidos)
Publisher of the Year	Nintendo	Electronic Arts, Rockstar Games
Retailer of the Year	GAME	Amazon.co.uk, Gameplay.com
Hardware of the Year	Nintendo Game Boy Advance SP	SCEE EyeToy, Microsoft Xbox Live!
Unsung Hero Game of the Year	Viewtiful Joe (Capcom)	No One Lives Forever 2: A Spy in H.A.R.M.'s Way (Monolith Productions), Steel Battalion (Capcom)
Hall of Fame Industry Personality of the Year	Shigeru Miyamoto (Nintendo)	
Editor's Award: Game of the Year	Pro Evolution Soccer 3 (Konami)	Call of Duty (Activision), The Legend of Zelda: The Wind Waker (Nintendo)
Most Wanted Game for Christmas	Mario Kart: Double Dash (Nintendo)	Pro Evolution Soccer 3 (Konami), WWE SmackDown! Here Comes the Pain (THQ)
Most Anticipated Game for 2004	Half-Life 2 (Valve)	Doom III (Activision), Halo 2 (Microsoft)
Ultimate Game of the Year	Grand Theft Auto: Vice City (Rockstar)	The Legend of Zelda: The Wind Waker (Nintendo), Star Wars: Knights of the Old Republic (Activision/LucasArts)

=== 2004 ===
The 2004 ceremony took place at the Park Lane Hilton on 5 November 2004 and was hosted by Matt Lucas.

Award	Winner	Runners-up
PS2 Game of the Year	Burnout 3: Takedown (Electronic Arts)	Pro Evolution Soccer 3 (Konami), Spider-Man 2 (Activision)
GameCube Game of the Year	Mario Kart: Double Dash (Nintendo)	Metal Gear Solid: The Twin Snakes (Konami), Final Fantasy Crystal Chronicles (Nintendo)
Handheld Game of the Year	Sonic Advance 3 (THQ)	Metroid Zero Mission (Nintendo), Mario & Luigi: Superstar Saga (Nintendo)
Xbox Game of the Year	Fable (Microsoft)	Splinter Cell: Pandora Tomorrow (Ubisoft), Grand Theft Auto: Double Pack (Rockstar Games)
PC Game of the Year	Doom 3 (Activision)	X2: The Threat (Deep Silver), Far Cry (Ubisoft)
Online Game of the Year	Battlefield Vietnam (Electronic Arts)	Burnout 3: Takedown (Electronic Arts), Counter-Strike: Condition Zero (Valve)
Publisher of the Year	Electronic Arts	THQ, Ubisoft
Retailer of the Year	Amazon.co.uk	GAME, Play.com
Hardware of the Year	Nintendo GBA SP	Creative Labs Gigaworks S750, GBA Wireless Adapter
Unsung Hero Game of the Year (Editors' Award)	The Chronicles of Riddick: Escape from Butcher Bay (VU Games)	The Suffering (Midway), Mashed (Empire Interactive)
Game of the Year (Editors' Award)	Pro Evolution Soccer 4 (Konami)	The Legend of Zelda: Four Swords (Nintendo), Joint Operations: Typhoon Rising (NovaLogic)
Hall of Fame - Industry Personality of the Year	Warren Spector (Ion Storm)	
Most Wanted Game for Xmas	Grand Theft Auto: San Andreas (Rockstar Games)	Half-Life 2 (Valve), Halo 2 (Microsoft)
Most Wanted Game For 2005	The Legend of Zelda: Twilight Princess (Nintendo)	Metal Gear Solid: Snake Eater (Konami), Resident Evil 4 (Capcom)
Ultimate Game of the Year	Doom 3 (Activision)	Fable (Microsoft), Pro Evolution Soccer 4 (Konami)
Ultimate Gaming Hero	Sonic the Hedgehog (Sega)	Master Chief (Halo 2, Microsoft); Lara Croft (Tomb Raider, Eidos)

=== 2005 ===
The 2005 ceremony took place at the Park Lane Hilton on 4 November 2005 and was hosted by Jimmy Carr.

Award	Winner
PlayStation 2 Game of the Year	Grand Theft Auto: San Andreas (Rockstar Games)
GameCube Game of the Year	Resident Evil 4 (Capcom)
Xbox Game of the Year	Halo 2 (Microsoft)
PC Game of the Year	Half-Life 2 (Valve)
Handheld Game of the Year	Super Mario 64 DS (Nintendo)
Best Film-Based Game of 2005	Resident Evil 4 (Capcom)
Best Game Soundtrack of 2005	Grand Theft Auto: San Andreas (Rockstar Games)
Online Game of the Year	World of Warcraft (Blizzard)
Publisher of the Year	Nintendo
Retailer of the Year	Play.com
Gaming Innovation of the Year	PSP
One to Watch for Xmas	The Legend of Zelda: Twilight Princess (Nintendo)
One to Watch for 2006	Resident Evil 5 (Capcom)
Hero of 2005	CJ (Grand Theft Auto: San Andreas, Rockstar Games)
Villain of 2005	Officer Tenpenny (Grand Theft Auto: San Andreas, Rockstar Games)
The Girl's Choice for 2005	The Sims 2 (Electronic Arts)
Editor's Game of the Year	Resident Evil 4 (Capcom)
Unsung Hero of the Year	Fahrenheit (Quantic Dream)
Ultimate Game of the Year	Grand Theft Auto: San Andreas (Rockstar Games)

=== 2006 ===
The 2006 ceremony took place at the Park Lane Hilton on 27 October 2006 and was hosted by Emma Griffiths.

Award	Winner
Ultimate Game of the Year	The Elder Scrolls IV: Oblivion (Bethesda Softworks)
PC Game of the Year	The Elder Scrolls IV: Oblivion (Bethesda Softworks)
PlayStation Game of the Year	Resident Evil 4 (Capcom)
Xbox Game of the Year	The Elder Scrolls IV: Oblivion (Bethesda Softworks)
Nintendo Game of the Year	New Super Mario Bros. (Nintendo)
Handheld Game of the Year	Grand Theft Auto: Liberty City Stories (Rockstar Games)
Online Game of the Year	Age of Empires III (Ensemble Studios)
The All-Nighter Award	Pro Evolution Soccer 5 (Konami)
The One to Watch 2007	PlayStation 3 (Sony)
The Editor's Choice Award	Tom Clancy's Ghost Recon Advanced Warfighter (Ubisoft)
Publisher of the Year	Electronic Arts
Retailer of the Year	GAME
Soundtrack of the Year	Need for Speed: Carbon (Electronic Arts)
Innovation Award	Xbox Live Marketplace (Microsoft)
Family Game of the Year	Nintendogs (Nintendo)
Favourite Character Award	Lara Croft (Tomb Raider, Eidos)
Girls' Choice Award	Nintendogs (Nintendo)

=== 2007 ===
The 2007 ceremony took place at the Park Lane Hilton on 26 October 2007 and was hosted by David Mitchell.

Award	Winner
Ultimate Game of the Year	Gears of War (Epic Games)
Xbox Game of the Year	Gears of War (Epic Games)
PC Game of the Year	Lord of the Rings Online: Shadows of Angmar (Midway)
PlayStation Game of the Year 2007	God of War II (Santa Monica Studio)
Nintendo Game of the Year	The Legend of Zelda: Twilight Princess (Nintendo)
The Editor's Choice Award	Gears of War (Epic Games)
Publisher of the Year	Nintendo
Retailer of the Year	GAME
The One to Watch	Assassin's Creed (Ubisoft)
UK Developer of the Year	Codemasters
Online Game of the Year	World of Warcraft: The Burning Crusade (Blizzard Entertainment)
All-Nighter	Gears of War (Epic Games)
Soundtrack of the Year	Guitar Hero II (Harmonix Music Systems)
Innovation of the Year	Nintendo Wii
Mobile Game of the Year	Final Fantasy
Handheld Game of the Year	Grand Theft Auto: Vice City Stories (Rockstar)
Family Game of the Year 2007	Wii Sports (Nintendo)
Girls' Choice Game of the Year 2007	Guitar Hero II (Harmonix Music Systems)

=== 2008 ===
The 2008 ceremony took place at the Park Lane Hilton on 31 October 2008 and was hosted by Frankie Boyle.

Award	Winner
Nuts All-Nighter Award	Call of Duty 4: Modern Warfare (Activision)
Handheld Game of the Year	The Legend of Zelda: Phantom Hourglass (Nintendo)
Mobile Game of the Year	Bejeweled 2 (PopCap Games)
Mobile Game Pitch 2008	Finders Keeper (Tobias Rowe)
Nintendo Game of the Year	Super Smash Bros: Brawl (Nintendo)
PC Game of the Year Sponsored by United Kingdom eSports Association	Call of Duty 4: Modern Warfare (Activision)
Retailer of the Year	Play.com
Official PlayStation Magazine HD PlayStation Game of the Year	Metal Gear Solid 4: Guns of the Patriots (Konami)
Soundtrack of the Year	Grand Theft Auto IV (Rockstar Games)
Xbox Game of the Year	Grand Theft Auto IV (Rockstar Games)
Most Wanted Award	Fallout 3 (Bethesda)
Online Game of the Year	Call of Duty 4: Modern Warfare (Activision)
UK Developer of the Year	Rockstar North
Grand Master Flash Award	Stickman Madness
One to Watch	Call of Duty: World at War (Activision)
UK Publisher of the Year	Activision Blizzard
Ultimate Game of the Year	Call of Duty 4: Modern Warfare (Activision)

=== 2009 ===
The 2009 ceremony took place at the Park Lane Hilton on 30 October 2009 and was hosted by Sean Lock.

Award	Winner
Family Game of the Year	LittleBigPlanet (Sony)
Handheld Game of the Year	Grand Theft Auto: Chinatown Wars (Rockstar Games)
Retailer of the Year	GAME
Mobile Game of the Year	Metal Gear Solid Touch (Konami)
Nintendo Game of the Year	Call of Duty: World at War (Activision)
Multiplayer Game of the Year	Call of Duty: World at War (Activision)
Soundtrack of the Year	Guitar Hero World Tour (Activision)
Xbox Game of the Year	Gears of War 2 (Epic Games)
PC Game of the Year	Fallout 3 (Bethesda Softworks)
UK Developer of the Year	Jagex
PlayStation Game of the Year	Killzone 2 (Sony)
Publisher of the Year	Activision Blizzard
Online Game of the Year	Left 4 Dead (Valve)
ShortList One to Watch	Call of Duty: Modern Warfare 2 (Activision)
Ultimate Game of the Year	Fallout 3 (Bethesda Softworks)

=== 2010 ===
The 2010 ceremony took place at the Bridge Park Plaza on 29 October 2010 and was hosted by Rich Hall.

Award	Winner
Action/Adventure Game of the Year, in association with Nuts	Assassin's Creed II (Ubisoft)
Download Game of the Year, in association with Green Man Gaming	Plants vs. Zombies (PopCap Games)
Fighting Game of the Year, in association with Official Nintendo Magazine	Street Fighter IV (Capcom)
Music Game of the Year, in association with Total Film	Guitar Hero 5 (Activision)
The One to Watch	Call of Duty: Black Ops (Activision)
Online Game of the Year	League of Legends (Riot Games)
Portable Game of the Year	Pokémon HeartGold/Soul Silver (Nintendo)
Puzzle Game of the Year	World of Goo (2D Boy)
Racing Game of the Year	Forza Motorsport 3 (Microsoft)
RPG of the Year	Mass Effect 2 (Electronic Arts)
Shooter of the Year, in association with ITN Game On	Call of Duty: Modern Warfare 2 (Activision)
Soundtrack of the Year, in association with Metal Hammer	Final Fantasy XIII (Square Enix)
Sports Game of the Year	FIFA 10 (Electronic Arts)
Strategy Game of the Year	Plants vs. Zombies (PopCap Games)
UK Developer of the Year	Jagex
Ultimate Game of the Year	Mass Effect 2 (Electronic Arts)

=== 2011 ===
The 2011 ceremony took place at the Bridge Park Plaza on 21 October 2011 and was hosted by Seann Walsh.

Award	Winner
Shooter of the Year	Call of Duty: Black Ops (Activision)
Action/Adventure Game of the Year	Assassin's Creed: Brotherhood (Ubisoft)
Download Game of the Year	Minecraft (Mojang)
Fighting Game of the Year	Mortal Kombat (Warner Bros.)
Free to Play Game of the Year	League of Legends (Riot Games)
Music Game of the Year	Guitar Hero: Warriors of Rock (Activision)
The One to Watch	The Elder Scrolls V: Skyrim (Bethesda Softworks)
Online Game of the Year	World of Warcraft (Blizzard Entertainment)
Mobile Game of the Year	Angry Birds Rio (Rovio Entertainment)
Racing Game of the Year	Gran Turismo 5 (Sony)
RPG of the Year	Fallout: New Vegas (Obsidian Entertainment)
Sports Game of the Year	FIFA 11 (Electronic Arts)
Best MMO	World of Warcraft (Blizzard)
Strategy Game of the Year	StarCraft II: Wings of Liberty (Blizzard)
Innovation of the Year	Nintendo 3DS
Outstanding Contribution	Sonic the Hedgehog (Sega)
Ultimate Game of the Year	Portal 2 (Valve)

=== 2012 ===
The 2012 ceremony took place at the Bridge Park Plaza on 26 October 2012 and was hosted by Ed Byrne.

Award	Winner
Shooter of the Year	Battlefield 3 (Electronic Arts)
Action/Adventure Game of the Year	Batman: Arkham City (Warner Bros.)
Download Game of the Year	Minecraft (Mojang)
Fighting Game of the Year	Mortal Kombat Komplete Edition (Warner Bros.)
Free to Play Game of the Year	Slender: The Eight Pages (Parsec Productions)
Handheld Game of the Year	Uncharted: Golden Abyss (Sony)
Top Gaming Moment	Skyrim: Throat of the World (Bethesda Softworks)
DLC of the Year	Portal 2's Perpetual Testing Initiative (Valve)
One to Watch	Grand Theft Auto V (Rockstar)
MMO Game of the Year	World of Tanks (Wargaming (company))
Mobile Game of the Year	Angry Birds Space (Rovio Entertainment)
Racing Game of the Year	Forza Motorsport 4 (Microsoft)
RPG of the Year	The Elder Scrolls V: Skyrim (Bethesda Softworks)
Sports Game of the Year	FIFA 12 (Electronic Arts)
Strategy Game of the Year	Civilization V: Gods & Kings (2K Games)
Ultimate Game of the Year	The Elder Scrolls V: Skyrim (Bethesda Softworks)
YouTube Gamer	The Yogscast
Outstanding Contribution	FIFA (Electronic Arts)

=== 2013 ===
The 2013 ceremony took place at the indigO2 on 25 October 2013 and was hosted by Ed Byrne.

Award	Winner
Best Newcomer	The Last of Us (Sony)
Most Wanted	The Witcher 3: Wild Hunt (CD Projekt Red)
Best Indie Game	Mark of the Ninja (Klei Entertainment)
Best Visual Design	BioShock Infinite (2K Games)
Best Multiplayer	Payday 2 (Starbreeze Studios)
Best Gaming Moment	Far Cry 3: "The Definition of Insanity" (Ubisoft)
Studio of the Year	Naughty Dog
Innovation of the Year	Oculus Rift
Best Storytelling	The Last of Us (Sony)
Best Online Game	World of Tanks (Wargaming (company))
Best Handheld Game	Assassin's Creed III: Liberation (Ubisoft)
YouTube Gamer Award	The Yogscast
Best Gaming Platform	Steam
Best Mobile/Tablet Game of the Year	XCOM: Enemy Unknown (2K Games)
Game of the Year	Grand Theft Auto V (Rockstar)
Hall of Fame	Call of Duty (Activision)
Lifetime Achievement	Ken Levine

=== 2014 ===
The 2014 ceremony took place at the indigO2 on 24 October 2014 and was hosted by Ed Byrne.

Award	Winner
Best Original Game	DayZ (Bohemia Interactive)
Best Online Game	Hearthstone: Heroes of Warcraft (Blizzard Entertainment)
Best Storytelling	The Last of Us: Left Behind (Sony)
Best Visual Design	Assassin's Creed IV: Black Flag (Ubisoft)
Best Audio	Assassin's Creed IV: Black Flag (Ubisoft)
Playfire Most Played Game	Rust (Facepunch Studios)
Best Multiplayer	Battlefield 4 (Electronic Arts)
Best Indie Game	DayZ (Bohemia Interactive)
Innovation of the Year	Oculus Rift DK2
Best Gaming Moment	The Last of Us: Left Behind - The Kiss (Sony)
Handheld Game of the Year	Pokémon X and Y (Nintendo)
Best Mobile Game	Hearthstone: Heroes of Warcraft (Blizzard Entertainment)
Most Wanted	The Witcher 3: Wild Hunt (CD Projekt Red)
Gaming Personality	PewDiePie
Studio of the Year	Ubisoft Montreal
Best Gaming Platform	Steam
Lifetime Achievement	Hideo Kojima
Game of the Year	Dark Souls II (Bandai Namco Entertainment)

=== 2015 ===
The 2015 ceremony took place at the indigO2 on 30 October 2015 and was hosted by Danny Wallace.

Award	Winner
Best Original Game	Bloodborne (Sony Computer Entertainment)
Best Storytelling	The Witcher 3: Wild Hunt (CD Projekt Red)
Best Visual Design	The Witcher 3: Wild Hunt (CD Projekt Red)
Best Audio	Ori and the Blind Forest (Microsoft Studios)
Best Multiplayer Game	Grand Theft Auto Online (Rockstar Games)
Best Indie Game	Kerbal Space Program (Squad)
Family Game	Splatoon (Nintendo)
Playfire Most Played Award	Grand Theft Auto V (Rockstar Games)
Best Gaming Moment	The Witcher 3: Wild Hunt (The Bloody Baron Quest)
Gaming Personality	PewDiePie
eSports Icon	Anders Blume (Counter-Strike: Global Offensive)
Studio of the Year	CD Projekt Red
Innovation of the Year	First-person mode in Grand Theft Auto V (Rockstar Games)
Gaming Platform of the Year	Steam (Valve)
Performance of the Year	Ashly Burch as Chloe Price (Life Is Strange)
PlayStation Game of the Year	Bloodborne (Sony)
Xbox Game of the Year	Ori and the Blind Forest (Microsoft Game Studios)
Nintendo Game of the Year	Splatoon (Nintendo)
PC Game of the Year	Grand Theft Auto V (Rockstar Games)
Most Wanted Game	Fallout 4 (Bethesda Softworks)
Ultimate Game of the Year	The Witcher 3: Wild Hunt (CD Projekt Red)GOTY
Critics' Choice	Metal Gear Solid V: The Phantom Pain (Kojima Productions)
Best Handheld / Mobile Game	Fallout Shelter (Bethesda Softworks)
Lifetime Achievement	Satoru Iwata (posthumous)

=== 2016 ===
The 2016 ceremony took place at the indigO2 on 18 November 2016 and was hosted by James Veitch.

Award	Winner
Best Original Game	Overwatch (Blizzard Entertainment)
Best Storytelling	The Witcher 3: Wild Hunt – Blood and Wine (CD Projekt Red)
Best Visual Design	The Witcher 3: Wild Hunt – Blood and Wine (CD Projekt Red)
Best Audio	Fallout 4 (Bethesda Softworks)
Best Indie Game	Firewatch (Panic)
Gaming Personality of the Year	Sean Plott
Best Multiplayer Game	Overwatch (Blizzard Entertainment)
Competitive Play of the Year	coldzera's jumping AWP quad kill at MLG Columbus
Best Gaming Moment	Overwatch (Play of the Game)
YouTube - Upcoming Personality of the Year	Jesse Cox
Studio of the Year	CD Projekt Red
Innovation of the Year	Pokémon Go (Niantic, Inc.)
Lifetime Achievement	Eiji Aonuma
Best Gaming Platform	Steam
Best Gaming Performance	Doug Cockle as Geralt of Rivia (The Witcher 3: Wild Hunt – Blood and Wine)
Competitive Game of the Year	Overwatch (Blizzard Entertainment)
Nintendo Game of the Year	The Legend of Zelda: Twilight Princess HD (Nintendo)
PlayStation Game of the Year	Uncharted 4: A Thief's End (Sony Interactive Entertainment)
Xbox Game of the Year	Rise of the Tomb Raider (Microsoft Studios/Square Enix)
PC Game of the Year	Overwatch (Blizzard Entertainment)
Handheld/Mobile Game of the Year	Pokémon Go (Niantic, Inc.)
Breakthrough	Stardew Valley (ConcernedApe)
Hall of Fame	Lara Croft
Critics' Choice	Titanfall 2 (Electronic Arts)
Most Wanted Game	Mass Effect: Andromeda (Electronic Arts)
Ultimate Game of the Year	Dark Souls III (Bandai Namco Entertainment)

=== 2017 ===
The 2017 ceremony took place at Bloomsbury Big Top on 17 November 2017 and was hosted by Danny Wallace.

Award	Winner
Best Storytelling	Horizon Zero Dawn (Sony Interactive Entertainment)
Best Visual Design	Cuphead (StudioMDHR)
Best Audio	The Legend of Zelda: Breath of the Wild (Nintendo)
Best Gaming Performance	Ashly Burch as Aloy (Horizon Zero Dawn)
Best Indie Game	Friday the 13th: The Game (Gun Media)
Best Multiplayer Game	PlayerUnknown's Battlegrounds (Bluehole)
Studio of the Year	Nintendo EPD
Best VR Game	Resident Evil 7: Biohazard (Capcom)
eSports Play of the Year	Agilities
eSports Team of the Year	Lunatic-Hai
eSports Game of the Year	Overwatch (Blizzard Entertainment)
Best Streamer/Broadcaster	Markiplier
Handheld/Mobile Game of the Year	Pokémon Sun and Moon (Nintendo)
Nintendo Game of the Year	The Legend of Zelda: Breath of the Wild (Nintendo)
PlayStation Game of the Year	Horizon Zero Dawn (Sony Interactive Entertainment)
Xbox Game of the Year	Cuphead (StudioMDHR)
PC Game of the Year	PlayerUnknown's Battlegrounds (Bluehole)
Critics' Choice Award	The Legend of Zelda: Breath of the Wild (Nintendo)
Breakthrough Award	Ashly Burch
Hall of Fame	Final Fantasy
Most Wanted Award	The Last of Us Part II (Sony Interactive Entertainment)
Still Playing Award	World of Tanks (Wargaming (company))
Outstanding Contribution to the UK Games Industry	Debbie Bestwick MBE
Lifetime Achievement	Sid Meier
Ultimate Game of the Year	The Legend of Zelda: Breath of the Wild (Nintendo)

=== 2018 ===
The 2018 ceremony took place at Bloomsbury Big Top on 16 November 2018, and was hosted by Danny Wallace.

Award	Winner
Best Storytelling	God of War (Sony Interactive Entertainment)
Best Competitive Game	Fortnite Battle Royale (Epic Games)
Best Cooperative Game	Monster Hunter: World (Capcom)
Best Design	God of War (Sony Interactive Entertainment)
Best Indie Game	Dead Cells (Motion Twin)
Best Audio	God of War (Sony Interactive Entertainment)
Still Playing Award	World of Tanks (Wargaming)
Best Performer	Bryan Dechart as Connor (Detroit: Become Human)
eSports Game of the Year	Overwatch (Blizzard Entertainment)
Best VR Game	The Elder Scrolls V: Skyrim VR (Bethesda Softworks)
Studio of the Year	Santa Monica Studio
Best Streamer/Broadcaster	Bryan Dechart and Amelia Rose Blaire
Mobile Game of the Year	PUBG Mobile (Tencent Games)
PC Game of the Year	Subnautica (Unknown Worlds Entertainment)
PlayStation Game of the Year	God of War (Sony Interactive Entertainment)
Xbox Game of the Year	Forza Horizon 4 (Microsoft)
Nintendo Game of the Year	Octopath Traveler (Nintendo)
Breakthrough Award	Unknown Worlds
Most Wanted Award	Cyberpunk 2077 (CD Projekt)
Critics' Choice Award	Red Dead Redemption 2 (Rockstar Games)
Lifetime Achievement	Hidetaka Miyazaki
Outstanding Contribution	Xbox Adaptive Controller
Ultimate Game of the Year	Fortnite Battle Royale (Epic Games)

=== 2019 ===
The 2019 ceremony took place at Bloomsbury Big Top on 15 November 2019.

Award	Winner
Best Storytelling	Days Gone (Sony Interactive Entertainment)
Best Multiplayer Game	Apex Legends (Electronic Arts)
Best Visual Design	Devil May Cry 5 (Capcom)
Best Indie Game	Outer Wilds (Annapurna Interactive)
Best Audio	Resident Evil 2 (Capcom)
Still Playing Award	Minecraft (Mojang)
Best Performer	Logan Marshall-Green as David Smith (Telling Lies)
eSports Game of the Year	Fortnite Battle Royale (Epic Games)
Best VR/AR Game	Beat Saber (Beat Games)
Studio of the Year	Epic Games
Best New Streamer/Broadcaster	Ewok
Mobile Game of the Year	BTS World (Takeone Company)
PC Game of the Year	World of Warcraft Classic (Blizzard Entertainment)
PlayStation Game of the Year	Days Gone (Sony Interactive Entertainment)
Xbox Game of the Year	Gears 5 (Xbox Game Studios)
Nintendo Game of the Year	Super Smash Bros. Ultimate (Nintendo)
Breakthrough Award	House House
Most Wanted Award	Cyberpunk 2077 (CD Projekt)
Critics' Choice Award	Control (505 Games)
Lifetime Achievement	Yu Suzuki
Outstanding Contribution	Life is Strange (Dontnod Entertainment)
Ultimate Game of the Year	Resident Evil 2 (Capcom)

=== 2020 ===
The 2020 ceremony took place digitally on 24 November 2020 and was hosted by Laura Bailey and Travis Willingham.

Award	Winner
Best Storytelling	The Last of Us Part II (Sony Interactive Entertainment)
Best Multiplayer Game	Fall Guys (Devolver Digital)
Best Visual Design	The Last of Us Part II (Sony Interactive Entertainment)
Best Game Expansion	No Man's Sky: Origins (Hello Games)
Mobile Game of the Year	Lego Builder's Journey (The Lego Group)
Best Audio	The Last of Us Part II (Sony Interactive Entertainment)
Best Indie Game	Hades (Supergiant Games)
Still Playing Award	Minecraft (Mojang)
Studio of the Year	Naughty Dog
eSports Game of the Year	Call of Duty: Modern Warfare (Activision)
Best New Streamer/Broadcaster	iamBrandon
Best Family Game	Fall Guys (Devolver Digital)
Best Gaming Community	Minecraft (Mojang)
Best Performer	Sandra Saad as Kamala Khan (Marvel's Avengers)
Breakthrough Award	Among Us (Innersloth)
Outstanding Contribution	The Gaming Industry
PC Game of the Year	Death Stranding (505 Games)
Best Gaming Hardware	NVIDIA GeForce RTX 3080
PlayStation Game of the Year	The Last of Us Part II (Sony Interactive Entertainment)
Xbox Game of the Year	Ori and the Will of the Wisps (Xbox Game Studios)
Nintendo Game of the Year	Animal Crossing: New Horizons (Nintendo)
Most Wanted Award	Untitled God of War sequel (Sony Interactive Entertainment)
Critics' Choice Award	Hades (Supergiant Games)
Ultimate Game of the Year	The Last of Us Part II (Sony Interactive Entertainment)

=== 2021 ===
The 2021 ceremony took place on 23 November 2021 and was hosted by Nolan North and Emily Rose.

The Golden Joystick Awards celebrated 50 Years Of Games by asking the public to vote for the Ultimate Game Of All Time, which was won by the 2011 game Dark Souls. The PC also received the Best Gaming Hardware of All Time Award, which was accepted by Valve president Gabe Newell.

Award	Winner
Best Storytelling	Life Is Strange: True Colors (Square Enix)
Best Multiplayer Game	It Takes Two (Electronic Arts)
Best Visual Design	Ratchet & Clank: Rift Apart (Sony Interactive Entertainment)
Best Game Expansion	Ghost of Tsushima: Iki Island (Sony Interactive Entertainment)
Mobile Game of the Year	League of Legends: Wild Rift (Riot Games)
Best Audio	Resident Evil Village (Capcom)
Best Indie Game	Death's Door (Devolver Digital)
Still Playing Award	Final Fantasy XIV (Square Enix)
Best Gaming Community	Final Fantasy XIV (Square Enix)
Studio of the Year	Capcom
Best Performer	Maggie Robertson as Lady Dimitrescu (Resident Evil Village)
Breakthrough Award	Housemarque
PC Game of the Year	Hitman 3 (IO Interactive)
Best Gaming Hardware	Sony PlayStation 5
PlayStation Game of the Year	Resident Evil Village (Capcom)
Xbox Game of the Year	Psychonauts 2 (Xbox Game Studios)
Nintendo Game of the Year	Metroid Dread (Nintendo)
Most Wanted Award	Elden Ring (Bandai Namco Entertainment)
Critics' Choice Award	Deathloop (Bethesda Softworks)
Ultimate Game of the Year	Resident Evil Village (Capcom)
Ultimate Hardware of All Time	PC
Ultimate Game of All Time	Dark Souls (Bandai Namco Entertainment)

=== 2022 ===
The 2022 ceremony took place on 22 November 2022.

Award	Winner
Best Storytelling	Horizon Forbidden West
Best Multiplayer Game	Elden Ring
Best Visual Design	Elden Ring
Best Game Expansion	Cuphead: The Delicious Last Course
Best Audio	Metal: Hellsinger
Best Indie Game	Cult of the Lamb
Best Early Access Launch	Slime Rancher 2
Still Playing Award	Genshin Impact
Best Gaming Community	Final Fantasy XIV
Studio of the Year	FromSoftware
Best Performer	Manon Gage as Marissa Marcel (Immortality)
Breakthrough Award	Vampire Survivors
PC Game of the Year	Return to Monkey Island
Best Gaming Hardware	Steam Deck
PlayStation Game of the Year	Stray
Xbox Game of the Year	Grounded
Nintendo Game of the Year	Pokémon Legends: Arceus
Best Game Trailer	Goat Simulator 3 Announcement Trailer
Most Wanted Award	The Legend of Zelda: Tears of the Kingdom
Critics' Choice Award	Elden Ring
Ultimate Game of the Year	Elden Ring

=== 2023 ===
The 2023 ceremony took place at the Royal Lancaster Hotel on 10 November 2023, and was hosted by Troy Baker.

Award	Winner
Best Storytelling	Baldur's Gate 3 (Larian Studios)
Best Multiplayer Game	Mortal Kombat 1 (Warner Bros. Games)
Best Visual Design	Baldur's Gate 3 (Larian Studios)
Best Game Expansion	Cyberpunk 2077: Phantom Liberty (CD Projekt)
Best Audio	Final Fantasy XVI (Square Enix)
Best Indie Game	Sea of Stars (Sabotage Studio)
Best VR Game	Horizon Call of the Mountain (Sony Interactive Entertainment)
Best Streaming Game	Valorant (Riot Games)
Still Playing Award	No Man's Sky (Hello Games)
Best Gaming Community	Baldur's Gate 3 (Larian Studios)
Studio of the Year	Larian Studios
Best Lead Performer	Ben Starr as Clive Rosfield (Final Fantasy XVI)
Best Supporting Performer	Neil Newbon as Astarion (Baldur's Gate 3)
Breakthrough Award	Cocoon (Annapurna Interactive)
PC Game of the Year	Baldur's Gate 3 (Larian Studios)
Best Gaming Hardware	PlayStation VR2
PlayStation Game of the Year	Resident Evil 4 (Capcom)
Xbox Game of the Year	Starfield (Bethesda Softworks)
Nintendo Game of the Year	The Legend of Zelda: Tears of the Kingdom (Nintendo)
Best Game Trailer	Cyberpunk 2077: Phantom Liberty (CD Projekt)
Most Wanted Award	Final Fantasy VII Rebirth (Square Enix)
Critics' Choice Award	Alan Wake 2 (Epic Games)
Ultimate Game of the Year	Baldur's Gate 3 (Larian Studios)

=== 2024 ===
The 2024 ceremony took place at the De Vere Grand Connaught Rooms on 21 November 2024, and was hosted by Ben Starr.

Award	Winner
Best Storytelling	Final Fantasy VII Rebirth (Square Enix)
Best Visual Design	Black Myth: Wukong (Game Science)
Best Multiplayer Game	Helldivers 2 (Arrowhead Game Studios)
Best Audio Design	Astro Bot (Sony Interactive Entertainment)
Best Game Expansion	Elden Ring Shadow of the Erdtree (FromSoftware)
Best Indie Game - Self Published	Another Crab's Treasure (Aggro Crab)
Best Indie Game	Balatro (LocalThunk)
Studio of the Year	Team Asobi
Best Soundtrack	Final Fantasy VII Rebirth (Square Enix)
Best Game Trailer	Helldivers 2 (Arrowhead Game Studios)
Best Early Access Game	Lethal Company (Zeekerss)
Still Playing Award (Mobile)	Honkai: Star Rail (MiHoYo)
Still Playing Award (PC & Console)	Minecraft (Mojang Studios)
Streamers' Choice	Chained Together (Anegar Games)
Breakthrough	Balatro (LocalThunk)
Best Gaming Hardware	Steam Deck OLED (Valve)
Best Game Adaptation	Fallout
Best Supporting Performer	Briana White (Final Fantasy VII Rebirth as Aerith)
Best Lead Performer	Cody Christian (Final Fantasy VII Rebirth as Cloud)
PC Game of the Year	Satisfactory (Coffee Stain Studios)
Console Game of the Year	Helldivers 2 (Arrowhead Game Studios)
Critics' Choice	Helldivers 2 (Arrowhead Game Studios)
Most Wanted Game	Grand Theft Auto VI (Rockstar Games)
Ultimate Game of the Year	Black Myth: Wukong (Game Science)

=== 2025 ===
The 2025 ceremony took place at the 8 Northumberland Avenue on 20 November 2025, and was hosted by Maggie Robertson.

Award	Winner
Best Storytelling	Clair Obscur: Expedition 33 (Sandfall Interactive)
Best Visual Design	Clair Obscur: Expedition 33 (Sandfall Interactive)
Best Multiplayer Game	Peak (Aggro Crab and Landfall)
Best Remake / Remaster	The Elder Scrolls IV: Oblivion Remastered (Virtuos and Bethesda Game Studios)
Best Audio Design	Ghost of Yōtei (Sucker Punch Productions)
Best Game Expansion	Lies of P: Overture (Neowiz and Round8 Studio)
Best Indie Game - Self Published	Hollow Knight: Silksong (Team Cherry)
Best Indie Game	Blue Prince (Raw Fury)
Studio of the Year	Sandfall Interactive
Best Soundtrack	Clair Obscur: Expedition 33 (Sandfall Interactive)
Best Game Trailer	Grand Theft Auto VI (Trailer 2)
Best Early Access Game	R.E.P.O. (Semiwork)
Still Playing Award (Mobile)	Pokémon Go (Scopely)
Still Playing Award (PC & Console)	Minecraft (Mojang Studios)
Streamers' Choice	Peak (Aggro Crab and Landfall)
Breakthrough	Schedule 1 (TVGS)
Best Gaming Hardware	AMD Ryzen 9 9950X3D
Best Game Adaptation	Arcane (Season 2)
Best Supporting Performer	Ben Starr (as Verso in Clair Obscur: Expedition 33)
Best Lead Performer	Jennifer English (as Maelle in Clair Obscur: Expedition 33)
PC Game of the Year	Hollow Knight: Silksong (Team Cherry)
Console Game of the Year	Ghost of Yōtei (Sucker Punch Productions)
Critics' Choice Award	Donkey Kong Bananza (Nintendo EPD)
Most Wanted Game	Grand Theft Auto VI (Rockstar Games)
Ultimate Game of the Year	Clair Obscur: Expedition 33 (Sandfall Interactive)

=== 2026 ===
The 2026 ceremony took place at the Troxy in London on 11 November 2026, and was hosted by Alix Wilton Regan.

Award	Winner
Best Storytelling	Dispatch (AdHoc Studio)
Best Visual Design	Control Resonant (Remedy Entertainment)
Best Multiplayer Game	Meccha Chameleon (Lemorion_1224 and Haganeiro)
Best Remake / Remaster	The Witcher 3: Wild Hunt - Remastered (CD Projekt Red and Yigsoft)
Best Audio Design	Onimusha: Way of the Sword (Capcom)
Best Game Expansion	Doom: The Dark Ages - Revelations (id Software)
Best Indie Game - Self Published	Meccha Chameleon (Lemorion_1224 and Haganeiro)
Best Indie Game	Valheim (Iron Gate Studio)
Studio of the Year	Capcom
Best Soundtrack	Dispatch (AdHoc Studio)
Best Game Trailer	Resident Evil Requiem (Evil Has Always Had a Name)
Best Early Access Game	Subnautica 2 (Unknown Worlds Entertainment)
Still Playing Award (Mobile)	Balatro (LocalThunk)
Still Playing Award (PC & Console)	Minecraft (Mojang Studios)
Streamers' Choice	Meccha Chameleon (Lemorion_1224 and Haganeiro)
Developers' Choice	Meccha Chameleon (Lemorion_1224 and Haganeiro)
Best Gaming Hardware	Steam Controller
Best Game Adaptation	Iron Lung
Best Supporting Performer	Grace Saif (as Diana in Pragmata)
Best Lead Performer	Angela Sant'Albano (as Grace Ashcroft in Resident Evil Requiem)
PC Game of the Year	Crimson Desert (Pearl Abyss)
Console Game of the Year	Resident Evil Requiem (Capcom)
Critics' Choice Award	Big Walk (House House)
Most Wanted Game	The Witcher IV (CD Projekt Red)
Ultimate Game of the Year	Resident Evil Requiem (Capcom)
