= Personal Software Services =

Defunct British video game publisher

Personal Software Services (PSS) was a British software company based in Coventry, founded by Gary Mays and Richard Cockayne in 1981. The company was acquired by Mirrorsoft in 1987. PSS produced video games for the ZX Spectrum, Commodore 64, Amiga, Atari ST, Atari 8-bit computers, Amstrad CPC, Oric computers, and IBM PC compatibles.

PSS was known for strategic wargames, such as Theatre Europe and Falklands '82. Several games produced by the French company ERE Informatique were distributed in Britain by PSS, including Get Dexter.

== History ==
Personal Software Services was founded in Coventry, England, by Gary Mays and Richard Cockayne in 1981. The company had a partnership with French video game developer ERE Informatique, and published localised versions of their products to the United Kingdom. The Wargamers series was conceptualised by software designer Alan Steel in 1984 with Battle for Midway. During development of these titles, Steel would often research the topic of the upcoming game and pass on the findings to other associates in Coventry and London. Some games of the series were met with controversy upon release, such as Theatre Europe. In 1983, the company received recognition for being "one of the top software houses" in the United Kingdom, and was a finalist for BBC Radio 4's New Business Enterprise Award for that year.

In 1988, Cockayne took a decision to alter their products for release on 16-bit consoles, as he found that smaller 8-bit home computers such as the ZX Spectrum lacked the processing power for larger strategy games. Cockayne claimed that PSS were not pulling out of the 8-bit market, but no more 8-bit games were released post-1988.

Following years of successful sales throughout the mid 1980s, Personal Software Services experienced financial difficulties, in which Cockayne admitted that "he took his eye off the ball." The company was acquired by Mirrorsoft in February 1987, and was later dispossessed by the company due to strains of debt following its bankruptcy in 1991.

== Games ==
- Blade Alley, 1983
- Metro Blitz, 1983
- The Guardian, 1983
- Cosmic Split, 1983
- Light Cycle, 1983
- Centipede, 1983
- Invaders, 1983
- Hopper, 1983
- The Ultra, 1983
- Battle for Midway, 1984
- Deep Space, 1984
- Frank 'n' Stein, 1984
- Les Flics, 1984
- Maxima, 1984
- Xavior, 1984
- The Covenant, 1985
- Macadam Bumper, 1985
- Swords and Sorcery, 1985
- Theatre Europe, 1985
- Battle of Britain, 1985
- Annals of Rome, 1986
- Falklands '82, 1986
- Get Dexter, 1986
- Iwo Jima, 1986

=== After Mirrorsoft acquisition ===
- Battlefield Germany, 1987
- Bismarck, 1987
- Pegasus Bridge, 1987
- Sorcerer Lord, 1987
- Tobruk, 1987
- Legend of the Sword, 1988
- Firezone, 1988
- Austerlitz, 1989
- Final Frontier, 1989 (Note: Unrelated to the 1989 DOS game Star Trek V: The Final Frontier)
- Conflict: Europe, 1989
- Waterloo, 1989
- Battle Master, 1990
- The Final Battle, 1990
- Champion of the Raj, 1991
- J. R. R. Tolkien's Riders of Rohan, 1991
