= Iwo Jima (video game) =

1986 video game

- Title screen
- Developer: Personal Software Services
- Publisher: Personal Software Services
- Series: Strategic Wargames
- Platforms: Commodore 64, ZX Spectrum
- Release: UK: 1986
- Genre: Turn-based strategy
- Mode: Single-player

Iwo Jima is a turn-based strategy video game developed and published by Personal Software Services for the Commodore 64 and ZX Spectrum in 1986. The game is set during the Battle of Iwo Jima in the Pacific Ocean theatre of World War II and revolves around the United States Marine Corps' objective to secure the island of Iwo Jima from the Imperial Japanese Army.

The game is a turn-based strategy and focuses on the player using their units to attack Japanese forces in order to capture the island. The player assumes control of the Marine Corps and must eliminate all Japanese forces by ground, air, or naval combat. The game received mixed reviews upon release. Critics praised the game's value for money and easy difficulty for novice gamers; however, many criticised the graphics and mechanics.

== Gameplay ==
A map showing the land battles on Iwo Jima. Red sprites represent Japanese forces while black sprites show American positions

The game is a turn-based strategy focuses on the invasion and land battles of Iwo Jima. The player commands the United States Marine Corps against the Imperial Japanese Army, who are occupying the islands as part of the Pacific Ocean theatre of World War II. The game is menu-based and only allows the player to use four command functions; move, attack, land and pass. Depending on the difficulty set, the game lasts 32 to 36 turns and can only be won by eliminating all Japanese forces from the island before the final turn ends. During the game, the enemy may fortify their positions, launch air strikes against the United States Navy fleet or may perform suicide attacks if their unit is about to be wiped out. The player also has the ability to order air strikes against the enemy, if weather permits.

At the beginning of the game, the player has to allocate a number of American troops in order to establish a beachhead on one of the six beaches of the island. However, many of the beaches are scattered with land mines and may provide an initial disadvantage to the assault. Throughout the game, the player may call in air strikes and other assaults, however they are only available after the American forces are attacked or if the enemy retreats to an inaccessible location. At any time in the game, the player is also able to request troop reinforcements from the fleet. Furthermore, Japanese air forces may sink American battleships throughout the game, although the player will be given the opportunity to shoot them down. In addition, a Japanese submarine will sink American gunboats at random intervals, and cannot be destroyed in any way. There is no save function in the game.

== Reception ==
Reception

Review scores
Publication	Score
Crash	6/10
Computer and Video Games	5/10
Your Sinclair	6/10
Sinclair User	3/5

The game received mixed reviews from critics upon release. Both Gwyn Hughes of Your Sinclair and a reviewer of ZX Computing praised the game's value for money and heralded it as a "good introduction" to the wargaming genre, although Hughes believed that Iwo Jima was unlikely to provide established tacticians with a "major challenge" and the reviewer of ZX Computing was concerned that the game was "too easy". Sean Masterson of Crash criticised the graphics, stating that it was "let down by poor unit markers and terrain features". Gary Rook of Sinclair User asserted that the game was overall "competent", however he summarised it as "failing to excite". Rook also added that the game was well implemented and "inspiring".

A reviewer of Computer and Video Games criticised the game for having an "awkward mechanism" due to the lack of a save feature and neglecting historic realism. However, he compared the historical accuracy of the Battle of Iwo Jima for being more accurate than Falklands '82's interpretation of the Falklands War. Mark Reed of Computer Gamer stated that the game is "ideal" for novice players and also praised the simplicity of the controls, despite suggesting that experienced gamers of the genre would prefer "something more complex". Masterson similarly criticised the game's suitability for experienced gamers, suggesting that any appeal for a more experienced player is likely to be "very limited".

M. Evan Brooks reviewed the game for Computer Gaming World, and stated that "While Iwo/Falklands may not be to the taste of the experienced wargamer, they may prove just the ticket to gaining another convert to computer conflict simulations."
