= Ashkeron! =

1985 video game

- Developer: Texgate Computers
- Publisher: Mirrorsoft
- Platforms: Amstrad CPC, ZX Spectrum
- Release: EU: 1985
- Genre: Interactive fiction
- Mode: Single-player

Ashkeron! is an interactive fiction video game developed by Dorset-based Texgate Computers and published by Mirrorsoft for the Amstrad CPC and ZX Spectrum in 1985.

== Gameplay ==
The player character is Stephen the Blacksmith who is set to recover five treasures from the castle of an evil wizard. The game has a graphic feature called "walk-thru" where screen pictures scroll in the direction the player travels. The game supports joystick control and has a randomising option where the objects appear in different places in each playthrough.

== Reception ==
Reception

Review scores
Publication	Score
Aktueller Software Markt	0/2/7/2
Amstrad Action	70%
Amtix	20%
Crash	8/10
Computer and Video Games	7/10
Sinclair User	3/5
Sinclair Programs	70%

Computer Gamer said "Askeron [sic] isn't actually a bad game, just very average [...]". Home Computing Weekly called the game "complex, challenging and witty". Sinclair Programs called it "[a] gripping game, excellent value for money". Sinclair User said "[...] it doesn't have the detail which provides a compelling atmosphere". Your Spectrum said that "Ashkeron is well up to Mirrorsoft's usual standards".
