= Tobruk (video game) =

1987 video game

- Amstrad CPC cover art
- Developers: Personal Software Services; Data Design Systems (Spectrum)
- Publisher: Personal Software Services
- Designer: Alan Steel
- Series: Wargamers
- Platforms: Commodore 64, ZX Spectrum, Amstrad CPC
- Release: UK: 1987
- Genre: Turn-based strategy
- Mode: Single-player

Tobruk: The Clash of Armour is a turn-based strategy video game developed and published by Personal Software Services. It was exclusively released in the United Kingdom for the Commodore 64, ZX Spectrum and Amstrad CPC in 1987. The game is set during the 1941 Siege of Tobruk of the Western Desert Campaign in World War II and revolves around the Allied forces attempts to overthrow German field marshal Erwin Rommel from the city.

The game is a turn-based strategy which focuses mainly on tank combat and contains elements of arcade gameplay. In the game, the player controls the Axis powers and must capture and hold various Allied bases in both Italian Libya and British Egypt, with the city of Tobruk being the ultimate goal. The game received mixed reviews upon release; critics were divided over the gameplay and were largely negative over its interface and tank mechanics.

== Gameplay ==
A map showing the combat and minefields in Cyrenaica, Italian Libya.

The game is a top-down turn-based strategy which contains elements of arcade gameplay and focuses mainly on tank combat. It is a simulation of the 1941 Siege of Tobruk, a part of the Western Desert Campaign of World War II. The battle revolves around Australian and British (collectively referred to Allied forces) attempts to oust German field marshal Erwin Rommel from the city. If playing alone, the player controls the Axis powers and is not able to play on the side of the Allies unless a second player is involved. The main objective of the game is to capture and hold as many fortifications in Italian Libya as possible, with the city of Tobruk and the defence of Rommel being the ultimate goals.

The main display map of the game is focused on Cyrenaica, a representation of the Allied minefield that was laid in the Gazala Line between Gazala and Bir Hachieim. The Axis troops begin the game on the western side of the line, whilst Allied forces begin the offensive in British Egypt. A command box in the game provides the player with an instant report of a unit or landscape once hovered over; data given on units includes their strength in terms of supply of infantry, provisions, artillery, and the number of moves that unit can make on one turn. Every two turns lasts one in-game day and units are available to enter combat phases once a day is finished.

In a combat phase, the game shifts to an "arcade sequence", which allows the player to control a tank in the Sahara Desert. The arcade sequence presents a menu of tank functions; a gun turret, shell loading, firing and navigational buttons. Only one function can be used at a time; in order to drive the tank, the player has to use the navigational buttons to manoeuvre. If the tank becomes under attack, the gun turret or shell-firing mode must be activated for self-defence. Both the arcade sequence and tank controlling is optional, however, and is not required to finish the game.

== Reception ==
Reception

Review scores
Publication	Score
Crash	65%
Your Sinclair	8/10
Sinclair User	2/5
Computer Gamer	84%

The game received mixed reviews upon release. Richard Blaine of Your Sinclair praised the game's playability and value for money, stating that it provides an "interesting challenge". Philippa Irving of Crash, however, criticised the playability and tank mechanics as "stunningly badly designed" and "unplayable", whilst also stating that it was "rather unatmospheric". Gary Rook of Sinclair User summarised that Tobruk was "pretty disappointing" and "nowhere near as successful" as its direct predecessor, Bismarck. Rook criticised the interface of the game as "clumsily" executed and not "half as good" as that of other strategy games at the time of release. Regarding the arcade sequences of the game, Michael Sandford of ZX Computing said they worked well but recommended inexperienced player to avoid them, as its difficulty would affect gameplay. However, Sandford praised the overall experience of the game, stating that it was "one of the best" wargames and endorsed it to anybody interested in the genre.

M. Evan Brooks reviewed the game for Computer Gaming World, and stated that "Simulations should break new ground or cover old ground in new and/or alternative conceptualizations. While Tobruk has an interesting operational interface, it is not groundbreaking in either of the above senses."

Computer Gamer asserted that Tobruk was "undoubtedly one of the most enjoyable wargames ever" and heralded its originality and playability. Irving, however, criticised its authenticity; stating that the game was lacking in both "elusive quality" and atmosphere. Rook found that the developers' intention of attempting to "marry strategy gaming with arcade gaming" was unsuccessful and produced negative results. A 1993 Computer Gaming World survey of wargames agreed while giving the game one-plus stars out of five, stating that "the simulation and arcade aspects denigrate each other's appeal".
