= Swords and sorcery (disambiguation) =

Sword and sorcery is a subgenre of fantasy characterized by sword-wielding heroes in exciting and violent adventures.

It may also refer to these:

== Books and literature ==
- Swords and Sorcery, a 1963 anthology of fantasy short stories in the sword and sorcery subgenre
- Sword of Sorcery, a 1978 comics anthology featuring Fritz Leiber's Fafhrd and the Gray Mouser
- Sword and Sorcery Studios, a publisher of role-playing game supplements
- Sword and Sorceress series of fantasy short story anthologies

== Games ==
- Swords & Sorcery (board game), 1978
- Swords & Sorcerers, a 1978 role-playing game supplement for Chivalry & Sorcery
- Swords and Sorcery (video game), a 1985 video game
- Superbrothers: Sword & Sworcery EP, a 2011 video game

== Film ==
- Sword & Sorcery Productions, a film production company founded by Milton Subotsky
- The Sword and the Sorcerer, a 1982 film
- Sword and sorcery films, a list of genre films

== Other ==
- Sword & Sworcery LP: The Ballad of the Space Babies, a video game score by Jim Guthrie

== See also ==
- Sword and sandal, a genre of Italian costume adventure epic films
