= The Final Battle (video game) =

1990 video game

- Developer(s): Silicon Software
- Publisher(s): Personal Software Services / Mirrorsoft
- Platform(s): Atari ST, Amiga, MS-DOS
- Release: 1990
- Genre(s): Adventure
- Mode(s): Single-player

The Final Battle is a fantasy adventure video game published by Personal Software Services for the Amiga and Atari ST in November 1990. The game was originally scheluded to be released in January of the same year. An MS-DOS port was released later in 1991. It is a sequel to Legend of the Sword from 1988.

== Plot ==
At the end of Legend of the Sword, the evil wizard, Suzar was imprisoned in a teardrop. He has now escaped and has stolen Avar's magical artifacts: the sword and the shield. The player character from the last game, Steroff, has been imprisoned underground with his surviving party members, Cysella and Pagan. The objective is to escape from prison and retrieve the stolen items from Suzar.

== Gameplay ==
The game is a mouse-driven point-and-click adventure game with role-playing elements. The game is depicted from an isometric viewpoint. Each party member's abilities are required to solve different puzzles.

== Reception ==
Reception

Review scores
Publication	Score
Aktueller Software Markt	32/60 (DOS)
Amiga Format	56%
ST Action	71%
ST Format	52%
Génération 4	62%

Amiga Format said "the sheer impenetrability of the game's command and control system is a deterrent from trying anything remotely innovative and ultimately from playing the game at all". ST Format criticized the controls and the camera angle. ST Action called the icon system "well implemented and simple to use" and the gameplay "challenging and entertaining".
