= Theatre Europe =

1986 video game

- North American cover art
- Developer: Personal Software Services
- Publisher: Personal Software Services
- Designers: Alan Steel; Sean Pearce; David Bolton
- Series: Strategic Wargames
- Platforms: Commodore 64, ZX Spectrum, Amstrad CPC, Atari 8-bit, Apple II
- Release: UK: 1985; NA: 1986
- Genre: Turn-based strategy
- Mode: Single-player

Theatre Europe is a turn-based strategy video game developed and published by Personal Software Services (PSS). It was first released in the United Kingdom for the Commodore 64, ZX Spectrum, Amstrad CPC, and Atari 8-bit computers in 1985. It was later released in France by ERE Informatique in 1986, and was released in the United States by Datasoft later that year.

The game is set during a fictional war in Europe between NATO and the Warsaw Pact, in which both sides use nuclear and chemical weapons. The developers used information and statistics on military strength from the Ministry of Defence and the Soviet embassy in London. The objective is to fight conventional battles in continental Europe, whilst trying to avoid a worldwide nuclear holocaust. During the game, capital cities and their civilian populations are destroyed by nuclear weapons. The game ends once either side is forced to surrender or if the entire population of Europe perishes. To request a nuclear strike, the player was required to call a dedicated telephone number to hear an automated message giving the authorisation code.

Theatre Europe was criticized by the Campaign for Nuclear Disarmament (CND) and The Sun newspaper. Some high street retail chains refused to sell the game upon release. The game received critical acclaim for its accuracy, playability and value for money. It won the "Best Strategy Game" award at the 1985 Golden Joystick Awards and was nominated for "Game of the Year".

PSS released a 16-bit follow-up game in 1989, Conflict: Europe.

== Gameplay ==
A map displaying NATO and Soviet troop deployments in Europe. The background colour will turn red once a chemical or nuclear strike is imminent.

The game is a turn-based strategy and revolves around a fictional conflict between the powers of NATO and allies of the Warsaw Pact. The player has the choice of choosing either NATO or the Warsaw Pact (collectively referred to as Soviet forces), or a "demo" computer versus computer option, where the game plays itself. The game takes place over a period of 30 in-game days, in which one day is equal to one "round". There are three types of difficulty; level one, in which unless provoked, the enemy will not use nuclear weapons, whilst levels two and three will enable the enemy to use nuclear and chemical attacks to prevent the player from winning the game.

The main feature of the game is focused on a map of Europe and western Russia, which displays accurate terrain such as mountain ranges, major cities, borders and all military forces belonging to each side. The game also features an arcade sequence which involves shooting down enemy units in order to secure combat bonuses; this gameplay mode, however, can be ignored by changing the game's settings. If the arcade sequences are turned on, the player will be notified to choose a battle on the map. Depending on the area chosen, an illustration of a battle commencing in countryside or a city is presented with various forms of military equipment including aeroplanes, helicopters and tanks. The player must shoot down and destroy enemy units using their cursor, in similar style to Missile Command. The outcome of the arcade sequence will affect the game; performing poorly will result in severe losses throughout that round.

After combat has been resolved, the player must move and assemble their forces in continental Europe, which is known as the movement phase. Two special units are exclusively available to the Warsaw Pact: "the 1st Airborne Army which can be flown directly behind enemy lines, and the 1st Amphibious Army which can move over the sea to a tactical attack point". Units are moved by cursor, and only one may be moved at a time. Once all units have been moved within a round, the attack phase will begin. Any amount of friendly units may attack an opposing army; however, once a unit has been dispatched for battle it cannot be stopped until the current attack phase concludes. During the attacking phase, a separate screen displaying combat information, such as enemy numbers and casualties, is displayed. If the screen detailing the attacking phase has been turned off in the settings, the battle will instead be decided on warrants of air superiority and armaments.

In this sequence, a capital city and its civilian population have been completely destroyed by nuclear weapons.

After battle sequences, the player will have the opportunity to rebuild their units by allocating a quantity of armament supplies, such as air support, which can be issued to any friendly unit on the map. After rebuilding ground units, the game will move onto an "air phase", which consists of commanding aircraft such as aeroplanes, bombers and a limited number of reserve air units. Several options for allocating air forces include: counter air strikes, reconnaissance on enemy movement, interdiction, assault breakers, and deep strikes. Counter air strikes involve attacks on enemy air bases, whereas interdiction involves aircraft being sent behind enemy lines in order to attack supply and movement networks. If interdiction aircraft are discovered in enemy territory, there will be a chance that the side will respond with a retaliatory nuclear strike. The remaining three aircraft options are to attack a single unit, strike enemy territory, and attack railways in order to disable enemy reinforcements, respectively.

The game allows the player to request chemical and nuclear tactical strikes against the enemy. A chemical attack is automatically targeted at an enemy capital city, and will conclude with a readout announcing the outcome of the attack, such as civilian casualties. In order to launch a strategic nuclear attack, the player is given 30 seconds to call a dedicated 1-800 telephone number and obtain a special authorisation code from the automated answerphone message (the authorisation code was 'Midnight Sun'). Once the authorisation code has been received, the player will be given three separate options on how to proceed. Standby mode will postpone the nuclear launch, whereas a strategic launch will involve one nuclear warhead targeting a city. The third option, known as "Fire-Plan", will issue a full-scale nuclear strike across Europe and results in a nuclear holocaust, which will end the game.

== Release ==
In the game, losing the conventional war was not as bad as starting a holocaust. We received plenty of criticism but we also had plenty of awards for a strategy game which created atmosphere.

— Richard Cockayne in an interview with Your Computer magazine in 1986

In an interview with Your Computer magazine, Gary Mays stated that Theatre Europe received heavy criticism from the Campaign for Nuclear Disarmament (CND). The CND accused the developers of "bad taste", despite Cockayne claiming that the organisation never "looked into the product". During development of the game, Cockayne and Mays obtained figures and statistics of various military strength from the Ministry of Defence and the Soviet embassy in London. Cockayne asserted that the statistics the developers gained were realistically plausible, stating that he would let the "horrifying results speak for themselves" during the game. Game designer Alan Steel stated that during testing, he was "alarmed" to discover when the computer played itself, the Warsaw Pact always won a conventional war overwhelmingly, forcing NATO to either surrender or begin a nuclear war. Steel adjusted the game to give NATO a chance to win. Theatre Europe was first released in the United Kingdom for the Commodore 64, ZX Spectrum, Amstrad CPC and Atari 8-bit home computers in 1985. It was then re-released in France and the United States for those consoles in 1986. Due to lobbying from the CND, high street outlets such as Boots and John Menzies refused to sell the game in their stores, with the former finding it "morally offensive".

== Reception ==
Reception

Review scores
Publication	Score
Crash	84%
Computer and Video Games	9/10
Your Sinclair	8/10
Computer Gamer	95%
Sinclair User	5/5
Zzap!64	94%
ACE	9/10

Awards
Publication	Award
Golden Joystick Awards	Best Strategy Game
Sinclair User	SU Classic

The game received critical acclaim upon release. Gwyn Hughes of Your Sinclair defended the accuracy and morality of the game, stating that it was not in "bad taste" and that the game was a "well researched program", which he thought would give the player an insight into the nature of modern war. Philippa Irving of Crash similarly stated that Theatre Europe offered more than a usual "run-of-the-mill" war game and heralded its simplistic nature, adding that novice gamers would "get in to it with ease". John Gilbert of Sinclair User added scepticism over the developer's intention of making something "so serious" as opposed to their other titles; however he praised the game as a "brilliant, if chilling" simulation. A reviewer writing for ZX Computing similarly stated that the game was "superbly chilling" and "extremely" well-presented. A reviewer of Computer and Video Games criticised the inferior graphics on the ZX Spectrum, stating that they were "a bit flawed" in comparison to the Commodore 64 version.

Bill Harrington reviewed the game for Computer Gaming World, and stated that " TE does a credible job of demonstrating the perils of escalation and dramatizing how slippery the slope to nuclear war might be, but is basically a game in search of a market."

Computer Gamer noted that the game attracted media attention, despite the objective of the game discouraging the use of nuclear weapons. Reed praised the presentation and gameplay, also stating that the use of a joystick and keyboard is "excellent". A reviewer from Zzap!64 heralded the presentation and value for money, stating that it is overall "very special indeed". The reviewer also gave praise to the sound, suggesting that the game featured "one of the best pieces of micro music ever". Antic stated that the Atari 8-bit version's "execution is uneven". The magazine reported that the arcade portion "quickly becomes a nuisance" and NATO could not defeat the Warsaw Pact because of lack of balance, flaws that did not exist in the Commodore 64 version. Peter Connor of Advanced Computer Entertainment said that Theatre Europe was a "gift", in regards to its value of money and level of playability. In a 1994 survey of wargames Computer Gaming World gave the title two-plus stars out of five, stating that it was "rendered obsolete by history and game play".

The game won the "Best Strategy Game" award at the 1985 Golden Joystick Awards and was nominated for "Game of the Year".
