= Sai Combat =

1986 video game

- Developer: David T Clark
- Publisher: Mirrorsoft
- Platforms: Amstrad CPC, ZX Spectrum
- Release: 1986
- Genre: Fighting
- Modes: Single-player, multiplayer

Sai Combat is a 1986 fighting video game published by Mirrorsoft for the ZX Spectrum and Amstrad CPC.

== Gameplay ==
Sai Combat is a one-on-one fighting game. The sais in the game don't refer to the stabbing weapons but rather long wooden poles. The player has to defeat eight opponents before becoming the Sai Master. In order to win a fight, the opponent has to be knocked down three times. The game includes a two-player multiplayer mode.

== Reception ==
Reception

Review scores
| Publication | Score |
|---|---|
| Aktueller Software Markt | 40/40 (ZX) |
| Amtix | 82% (CPC) |
| Crash | 81% (ZX) |
| Computer and Video Games | 34/40 (ZX); 30/40 (CPC) |
| Sinclair User | 5/5 (ZX) |

Award
| Publication | Award |
|---|---|
| Computer and Video Games | C+VG Hit |

Aktueller Software Markt called it the best fighting game on the Spectrum. Amtix called it "[a] competent fighting game that's worth looking at". The reviewers compared the game to The Way of the Tiger and The Way of the Exploding Fist. Computer and Video Games said the game is "good fun" and "graphically excellent". Crash said the game is better than International Karate but not as good The Way of the Exploding Fist.
