= Waterloo (video game) =

1989 video game

- Developer: Personal Software Services
- Publishers: EU: Mirrorsoft; NA: SSI
- Designer: Peter Turcan
- Platforms: MS-DOS, Amiga, Atari ST, Archimedes
- Release: EU: 1989; NA: 1990
- Genre: Wargame
- Mode: Single-player

Waterloo is a computer wargame by Personal Software Services for MS-DOS, Atari ST, Amiga, and Acorn Archimedes. It was released in the UK by Mirrorsoft in 1989 and in the US by Strategic Simulations in 1990.

The player takes the role of either Wellington or Napoleon at the Battle of Waterloo. The battle may be played with the historical orders or custom orders. It is a turn-based strategy game. The 100-page manual provides historical and military background to the battle as well as gameplay information. A fold-out map of the battlefield and initial dispositions of units is also provided.

== Gameplay ==
The game is played from the point of view of the commander, with the battlefield rendered in simple three-dimensional perspective rather than the overhead view traditionally typical of battlefield strategy games. This means that the player's knowledge of the progress of the battle is limited to what he can see with his own eyes and the reports of subordinates. The player may move around the battlefield to better observe events, but risks death or capture if he approaches too close to the front.

The player is not permitted to micromanage the movements of individual units, as these are not under his direct command; instead he must give orders to subordinate commanders who interpret them according to their own judgement. A subordinate commander will ignore an order he considers unfeasible.

Orders are issued using natural language commands reminiscent of adventure games. For example,

- "D'Erlon, at 1 15 pm order Donzelot defend the hills 1 mile south of you"
- "Lobau, transfer your cavalry to Reille"
- "Drouot, at 6 30 pm give support to Reille, D'Erlon and Milhaud"

Orders take time to arrive at their destinations, as do combat reports sent by subordinates to the player. Messengers may also be killed or captured. This means that units remote from the commander may not receive orders in time, while units engaged in combat may not receive them at all.

The game begins at 11:30 am and ends at 9:30 pm, when the results are assessed. The computer then decides if the player has been defeated, is victorious, or if the result is inconclusive.

== Reception ==
In the September–October 1989 edition of Games International (Issue #9), Mike Woodhouse called this "a marvellous simulation of a battle which was a pivotal point in history, and I am impressed with the quality of programming." He pointed out that the ground-level perspective, and the delay from issuing orders to having them executed "make for a game rather different to the usual computer wargame." He found the interface "a real pain" because the program did not highlight developments that occurred in each new segment of play, leaving the player to try to figure out what had developed. He also found that on slower machines, completing a game could take more than five hours. He concluded by giving the game play an average rating of 3 out of 5, and the graphics a below average score of only 2 out of 5. He recommended the game especially to students of military history, but warned board wargamers more used to conventional wargames "that you try Waterloo before splashing out on it."

In the July–August 1990 edition of Computer Gaming World (Issue 73), M. Evan Brooks, who had studied the Battle of Waterloo at the United States Army Command and General Staff College, admired the documentation, the background and history provided, and the method of issuing orders, although he pointed out certain ambiguities in attack and defense orders and their subsequent effects. He thought that the unusual, three-dimensional ground perspective was a radical departure from the usual bird's eye view usually employed, and the resulting uncertainty over the battle's progress helped make the game the most accurate of the ten simulations of the battle he had played. He found the graphics to be "very good", and although he found commanders and dispatch riders "displayed somewhat like Gumby" he still found the overall impression to be impressive. However, Brooks found that constant map redrawing, while it was not a problem on a fast computer, "does become burdensome on slower machines" and he also criticized the lack of audio. He concluded by giving the game an average rating of 3 out of 5, saying, "Waterloo is a radical departure from most wargaming. Its ground perspective and issuance of orders places the player in the role of the battlefield commander — with the disadvantages inherent in such position. The simulation will rapidly teach the user why commanders have difficulty in achieving battlefield success and why we compensate generals so well."

Two issues later, in the October 1990 edition of Computer Gaming World ((Issue 75), Brooks summarized his previous review as: "Much more of a wargame than the historic staff simulations more commonly produced, it is a fascinating, albeit frustrating, game."
