= Swords and Sorcery (video game) =

1985 video game

- ZX Spectrum cover art
- Developer: Personal Software Services
- Publisher: Personal Software Services
- Designers: Michael Simpson; Paul Hutchinson
- Platforms: ZX Spectrum, Amstrad CPC
- Release: UK: 1985
- Genre: Role-playing
- Mode: Single-player

Swords and Sorcery is a fantasy role playing video game developed and published by Personal Software Services. It was released exclusively in the United Kingdom for the ZX Spectrum in 1985 and the Amstrad CPC in 1986. The game contains elements of dungeon crawling and revolves around a customisable player-character navigating through catacombs in order to secure a large wealth of treasure, whilst simultaneously collecting seven pieces of sacred armour.

The game was released with dedicated t-shirts, badges and posters. It suffered from several delays throughout 1985 due to the complexity of programming. Swords and Sorcery received positive reviews from critics upon release; prominent praise included the graphics, colours, animation and its menu interface. It also won the "Game of the Month" award from Computer and Video Games in January 1986.

== Gameplay ==
The interface displays multiple functions; a map of the catacombs, a first person view of a location, and a command box. In this screenshot, the player-character has died and the Grim Reaper grants them an extra life.

Swords and Sorcery is presented in a first person top-down perspective and contains elements of dungeon crawling, a common trait of role playing video games. The game is set in a fictional land called Zob, where the main objective is to explore its catacombs and discover a large wealth of treasure, and collect the seven pieces of the sacred Zob armour. The game begins by allowing the player to choose their character; the default protagonist is called Flubbit the Dull, but there is an option to allow the player to create and personalise their own character. Once a character has been created, a 14 in-game day training scheme will commence which gives the player an opportunity to improve their abilities such as lock picking, sword fighting and thieving. An armoury is also accessible at any time, which includes utilities such as body armour and weaponry. The form of currency is dragon's teeth, which can be used to buy items and equipment.

Movement through the catacombs is controlled by command inputs and keywords, which is referred to in-game as MIDAS. For example, entering the word "hit" will bring down a menu and display various forms of attacking techniques. The left side of the screen displays an animated first person perspective of the respective tunnel or room the player is in, whereas the right side of the interface displays a top-down view of the catacombs. The bottom of the screen features a command box and announces available options or hints to the player; flashing arrows indicate where movement is possible throughout the catacombs. During the game, enemies such as gargoyles, catmen and warriors will appear at random and attack the player if confronted. Magic spells such as poison and fire are able to defeat enemies, alongside weaponry like swords and axes. The player-character has both a health and magic bar, which will slowly deplete once attacked by an enemy or by using magic spells, respectively. Items in the game include treasure and artefacts which may have a chance of giving the player negative effects, such as draining life and paralysing movement.

== Development ==
The game was announced in summer of 1984, but was delayed several times for over a year. Before its announcement, Swords and Sorcery had been in development for nearly two years prior to 1985. PSS explained the delays were due to game's complexity that required a lot programming man-hours. The game was PSS's biggest launch to date. Upon release, Swords and Sorcery came with t-shirts, badges and posters.

== Reception ==
Reception

Review scores
Publication	Score
Crash	9/10
Computer and Video Games	8/10
Your Sinclair	7/10
Sinclair User	4/5
ZX Computing	4/5
Aktueller Software Markt	95/100
Amstrad Action	70%

Awards
Publication	Award
Computer and Video Games	Game of the Month
Crash	Smash

The game received positive reviews upon release. Rachael Smith of Your Sinclair praised the imaginative atmosphere the game offered, stating that developers drew the players into a "convincing world" and speculated the game would become a "cult of sorts". Philippa Irving of Crash praised the presentation as "super" and the graphics as "rare for this type of game", saying it also offered "brilliant" animation which shows the detail in the "best way possible". Gary Rook of Sinclair User opinionated that Swords and Sorcery was aimed at "Rambo-style" dungeon explorers. Regarding the graphics, Rook stated they were "not staggering", but felt they served a purpose and would have been "deadly dull" if the game was text-based only.

A reviewer of ZX Computing called it the best Dungeons & Dragons version "ever produced on a computer", and said that it was "worth the wait". A reviewer of Computer and Video Games stated that the game was "unique" and could not be classified, but the reviewer criticized the speed of in-game combat, calling it "frustrating" at times. Despite this, Computer and Video Games awarded it their "Game of the Month" award for January 1986. Robert Fripp of German magazine Aktueller Software Markt concluded that the game presented a "successful" adventure. Bob Wade of Amstrad Action praised the game's presentation, depth and atmosphere, but criticized initial complexity and required time commitment. Computer Gamer received the game highly positively, calling it complex, difficult and immersive, giving particularly high points to atmosphere.

In a later retrospect of role-playing games, Advanced Computer Entertainment noted a common criticism of the game was that it was similar to "exploring an NCP car park", but the reviewer praised the game's ability to portray a "complex" world.
