= Battle for Midway (video game) =

1984 video game

- ZX Spectrum cover art
- Developer: Personal Software Services
- Publisher: Personal Software Services
- Designer: Alan Steel
- Series: Wargamers
- Platforms: Commodore 64, ZX Spectrum, MSX, Amstrad CPC
- Release: UK: 1984
- Genre: Turn-based strategy
- Mode: Single-player

Battle for Midway (also called The Battle of Midway) is a turn-based strategy video game developed and published by Personal Software Services. It was released in the United Kingdom for the Commodore 64 in 1984, with versions for the Amstrad CPC, MSX and ZX Spectrum published in 1985. It is the first instalment of the Wargamers series. The game is set during the Battle of Midway in the Pacific Ocean theatre of World War II and revolves around the United States Navy attacking a large Imperial Japanese fleet stationed at Midway Atoll, in retaliation for the attack on Pearl Harbor.

In the game, the player assumes control of American forces and must eliminate all Japanese forces around the atoll by air or naval combat. Battle for Midway received largely negative reviews upon release. It was criticised for its incompatibility with black and white television sets, as the game was only accessible in a limited range of colours. The easy difficulty of the gameplay was also criticised.

== Gameplay ==
A map showing combat around Midway Atoll

The game is a turn-based strategy and focuses on naval battles during the Battle of Midway, which is initiated in response to the Japanese attack on Pearl Harbor. The player commands three American task forces; two United States Navy forces and one United States Army Air Force unit, which are stationed on Midway Atoll. The objective of the game is to defeat three attacking Imperial Japanese naval forces. Each American task force has an aircraft carrier, whereas the Japanese have four. The player begins the game with two American search aircraft used to locate and track the attacking Japanese forces.

When the main attacking Japanese force has been located, the player must send all available air units to engage them in combat. Air combat takes place over real time, and may take up to a minute of travel time once launched from an aircraft carrier. Aircraft will run out of fuel over time and will crash if not refuelled at a carrier. The game contains elements of arcade gameplay, which will automatically enable once the player comes into contact with the enemy. The arcade sequences involves the player utilising an anti-air machine gun in order to shoot down Japanese aircraft. The game ends once all four Japanese aircraft carriers have been destroyed.

== Release ==
Upon release, Battle for Midway was packaged with an exclusive ring-binder and a manual detailing the nature of the Battle of Midway. It was later re-released as part of a Wargamers compilation cassette known as Conflicts 2, published by Personal Software Services.

== Reception ==
Reception

Review scores
Publication	Score
Crash	4/10
Your Sinclair	5/10
Sinclair User	2/5
Your Spectrum	2/5
Amstrad Action	59%
Amtix	57%
Your Computer	2/5

The game received negative reviews upon release. Angus Ryall of Crash criticised the game's incompatibility with black and white television sets, stating that, despite a growing British economy, Ryall expected the developers to have designed games for "the lowest common denominator". Gwyn Hughes of Your Sinclair criticised the tactical elements of the game as too light, stating that the success of the player depends on dexterity, and not "brainpower". Clare Edgely of Sinclair User praised the game's historical accuracy, however she felt that its late release in comparison to other wargames made Battle for Midway feel "ordinary". A reviewer of Your Computer stated that the game was a "flawed" attempt to recreate the famous Battle of Midway, despite admitting that it contained "some nice touches". A reviewer of Australian Commodore Review praised the game's wide range of features such as the save and load functions. However, they criticised menu designs and "insufficiently integrated" arcade sequences, calling them both "poor".

Two reviewers of Your Spectrum criticised the combat sequences' reliance on the speed of pressing keys instead of the use of strategy. One reviewer considered the game to be sophisticated, however the other reviewer viewed the game's slow pace and graphics negatively. Despite the criticism, Ryall praised the real time element of the game and accessibility, saying that Battle for Midway is up to "current standards". A reviewer of Amstrad Action praised the game's "accurate" reproduction of events and different levels of speed, however criticised the easy predictability of Japanese forces. A reviewer of Amtix stated that the game suffered from "average" graphics and "poor" sound, and also questioned the inclusion of the arcade sequences. A reviewer of Your 64 recommended Battle for Midway for beginners to the genre, despite stating that it was "not a simple game". A reviewer of Commodore Horizons called it an "enthralling" game.
