= Battle of Britain (1985 video game) =

1987 video game

- Commodore 64 cover art
- Developer: Personal Software Services
- Publisher: Personal Software Services
- Series: Strategic Wargames
- Platforms: Commodore 64, Amstrad CPC, ZX Spectrum
- Release: UK: 1985 (C64), Amstrad; UK: 1986 (Spectrum)
- Genre: Turn-based strategy
- Mode: Single-player

Battle of Britain is a turn-based strategy video game developed and published by Personal Software Services for the Commodore 64 and Amstrad CPC in 1985, and the ZX Spectrum the following year. The game is set during the Battle of Britain campaign of the Second World War and revolves around Britain's defence and prevention against a Nazi invasion. In the game, the player commands the Royal Air Force as they must defend key cities against the Luftwaffe.

The game contains elements of first-person shooting; during some sequences the game requires a certain number of aircraft to be shot down. Battle of Britain received mixed to positive reviews from critics upon release. Critics praised the fast pace of the gameplay and features, however, one reviewer was divided over the historical accuracy of the battle.

== Gameplay ==
A still image of gameplay. Gold colours represent cities, green represents RAF air bases and yellow represents radar installations.

The game is a turn-based strategy and focuses on air battles during the Battle of Britain campaign of the Second World War. The player commands squadrons of the Royal Air Force and the main objective of the game is to defend key cities and radar installations from the Luftwaffe. Unlike previous games in the series, Battle of Britain includes cursor movement, a scrolling interface and elements of first-person shooter gameplay.

The game has three individual scenarios; training mode (set on the lowest difficulty), Blitzkrieg mode, and campaign mode. Blitzkrieg mode only lasts one in-game day and features the Luftwaffe going out for an "all-out" attack simultaneously on every target and city, while the campaign mode takes place over a period of 30 days and is set on the highest difficulty. In addition, the campaign mode features historically accurate movements and strategies used by both the RAF and Luftwaffe.

The game contains elements of first-person shooting. In this sequence, a Spitfire attempts to destroy a Messerschmitt Bf 109.

At the start of the game, a wave of Luftwaffe aircraft (in the appearance of Balkenkreuz sprites on the map) will cross the English Channel and proceed to bomb various cities, air bases and radar installations. In response, the player must choose which RAF squadrons are scrambled and give orders to them. When an RAF squadron has successfully engaged a Luftwaffe unit on the map, if the player selected the optional arcade mode at the beginning of the game, the game will shift to first-person shooter perspective, in which the point of view is portrayed from a cockpit of a Spitfire. During this dogfight sequence, the number of Luftwaffe casualties will depend on how many aircraft the player was able to shoot down, however, choosing not to play the dogfights does not appear to disadvantage the player.

The game features a changing weather system, which will vary from every hour. Fog will close runways, and storms will slow down resupplies. Over time, RAF squadrons will run out of ammunition or fuel, and thus must replenish at the nearest RAF station. In between turns, the player has the opportunity to request reinforcements from RAF reserves, however the longer the campaign progresses, the quality of the reserves will diminish.

== Reception ==
Reception

Review scores
| Publication | Score |
|---|---|
| Crash | 8/10 |
| Computer and Video Games | 5/10 |
| Your Sinclair | 5/10 |
| Sinclair User | 3/5 |
| ACE | 83/100 |
| Commodore User | 4/5 |

The game received mixed to positive reviews from critics upon release. Gwyn Hughes of Your Sinclair praised the game's fast pace and tempo of gameplay, stating it to be "fast and furious". However, he criticised the arcade-style flying sequences, referring them as "dodgy" due to the system's lack of processing power. Philippa Irvine of Crash praised the "all-action" theme of the game, and heralded the campaign as "impressive" in both terms of content and length. Gary Rook of Sinclair User similarly praised the gameplay, suggesting that it had a "workmanship" quality to it, however he noted that it lacked a "certain sparkle". Gordon Hamlett of ZX Computing found some aspects of the gameplay confusing, comparing it to juggling. Jon Sutherland of Commodore User concluded that the game "is an enjoyable and absorbing game with a good balance between reflex and strategy gaming."

A reviewer of Computer and Video Games stated that the game "isn't very good", nor the best Battle of Britain recreation on the market, and criticised on how interceptions were "far too easy" to make. Reviewing the ZX Spectrum version of the game, a critic from Advanced Computer Entertainment cited the game as historically inaccurate due to it lasting only 30 days, whereas the actual Battle of Britain was considerably longer. However, they praised the gameplay as an "enjoyable challenge" and a good value for money.

The game was a runner-up for the 1985 Strategy Game of the Year at the Golden Joystick Awards.
