= Austerlitz (video game) =

1989 video game

- Amiga cover art
- Developer: Personal Software Services
- Publisher: Mirrorsoft
- Designer: Peter Turcan
- Series: Strategic Wargames
- Platforms: Amiga, Atari ST, MS-DOS
- Release: EU: 1989
- Genre: Turn-based strategy
- Mode: Single-player

Austerlitz is a turn-based strategy video game developed by Personal Software Services and published by Mirrorsoft. It was released in the United Kingdom and Germany for the Amiga, Atari ST and MS-DOS home computers in 1989. It was also re-released in France for Amiga home computers by Mirror Image in 1991. The game is set during the Battle of Austerlitz of the Napoleonic Wars and revolves around Napoleon's forces defending the Austrian village of Austerlitz from the invading army of Alexander I of Russia.

The game was developed by Peter Turcan, who also developed similar turn-based strategies such as Waterloo and Borodino for home computers in the 1980s. Austerlitz is presented in a 3D perspective over a battlefield; however, it features no sound. The game received mostly positive reviews upon release. Critics praised the graphics and presentation; however, some were divided over the historical accuracy of the battle and lack of sound.

== Gameplay ==
A view of the ongoing battle between French and Austro-Russian forces. An order from Napoleon is announced in the command box.

The game is a turn-based strategy and revolves around Battle of Austerlitz, where the forces under the command of Napoleon must defend the Austrian village of Austerlitz from the invading Austro-Russian army, led by Tsar Alexander. In the game, the battle itself begins at 7 am on 2 December 1805 and is played out in a series of turns. A turn lasts fifteen minutes and a total number of eight orders must be issued before the turn ends. The player may pick either French or Russian forces to control throughout the game. In order to move a unit, the player must select them and point their cursor over the desired location; however, it is restricted within a turn. At the start of a movement phase, the player can issue a command to one of their units. Orders include move, attack, defend, shell, stay in reserve, retreat and report.

Rotating the map using a compass is essential for ensuring an army moves in the desired direction. The order of a moving unit will not be carried out until the unit has reached its destination or if they have been killed before arriving there. Each order carried out is announced through the game's command box, which is situated at the bottom of the screen. Actions such as battles and unit losses are also announced. In order to attack the enemy from a distance, the player is able to command a unit to commence shelling, which will neutralise an enemy unit if successful. The game features no sound.

Austerlitz was developed by Peter Turcan, who also developed similar turn-based strategies, such as Waterloo and Borodino for the Atari ST.

== Reception ==
Reception

Review scores
Publication	Score
The Games Machine	82%
Tilt	D
ST Format	92%
ACE	73/100
Amiga Power	44%
Power Play	73%

The game received mostly positive reviews upon release. John Highcliffe of The Games Machine praised the historical accuracy of the game, stating that players with an interest in the era would enjoy the game. However, Highcliffe expressed concern over the slow pace of the game. Alain Huyghes-Lacour of Tilt praised the game's graphics and 3D presentation of the battle, stating that it exceeded the benchmark set by other wargames. Mark Higham of ST Format questioned the historical accuracy, stating that during the real battle, French forces used smoke grenades frequently, and criticised the lack of this inclusion in the game. However, Higham heralded the game as the best, saying that there is "no other wargame like it".

Mark Patterson of ACE praised the smooth animation and impressive graphics; however, he criticised the game's lack of sound as uninspiring. Higham considered Austerlitz superior to other games released by the developer, suggesting that it offered a higher state of realism. Lucinda Orr of Amiga Computing stated the graphics were "wonderful" and opinionated that the game was the best Napoleon warfare simulation of its kind. A reviewer of Amiga Format said that the 3D graphics were "great", but declared the lack of sound was the "last thing" a player would need in a serious wargame. Jonathan Davies of Amiga Power praised the graphics as the only "plus side" aspect of the game, however he criticised the slow pace of gameplay, stating that it would take hours and a lot of patience to type out orders. A reviewer of Australian Commodore and Amiga review asserted Austerlitz was designed for serious gamers, saying the complexity of the game would make "seasoned wargamers happy as pigs in mud".
