= Get Dexter =

1986 video game

- Amstrad CPC cover art
- Publishers: ERE Informatique; PSS
- Programmer: Remi Herbulot
- Platforms: Amstrad CPC, Atari ST
- Release: 1986: Amstrad CPC; 1987: Atari ST
- Genre: Adventure
- Mode: Single-player

Get Dexter (known as Crafton & Xunk in its country of origin, France) is a graphic adventure game, originally released for the Amstrad CPC in 1986. It was programmed by Remi Herbulot, with graphics by Michel Rho, and was published in France by ERE Informatique and by PSS in Britain. An Atari ST version was released in 1987. The game is played out in isometric area with a futuristic sci-fi plot with puzzle solving.

A sequel, Get Dexter 2, was released in 1988.

== Plot ==
In 2912 a war rages on Earth and is escalating out of control. If the Central Galactic Control Computer on Earth is destroyed then all life on the planets will perish with it. The council of Sages give Dexter, an android expert in dangerous missions, and Scooter his trusty Podocephalus, the mission to infiltrate the computer centre and copy the memory in order that Galactic life can continue.

== Reception ==
Reception

Award
Publication	Award
Amstrad Action	Mastergame
