= Bismarck (video game) =

1987 video game

- Atari ST cover art
- Developer: Personal Software Services
- Publishers: UK: Mirrorsoft; US: Datasoft
- Designer: Alan Steel
- Series: Strategic Wargames
- Platforms: Amiga, Apple II, Atari 8-bit, Atari ST, Commodore 64, ZX Spectrum
- Release: UK: 1987; NA: 1988
- Genre: Turn-based strategy
- Mode: Single-player

Bismarck is a turn-based strategy video game developed by Personal Software Services and published by Mirrorsoft. It was first released for the Commodore 64 and ZX Spectrum in 1987 for the United Kingdom. It was ported to Amiga, Apple II, Atari ST, and Atari 8-bit computers in both the United Kingdom and the United States the following year. In the game, the player can choose to control either the German battleship Bismarck or command the pursuing fleet of Royal Navy ships.

The game is set during the Last battle of the battleship Bismarck of World War II and revolves around the Bismarck attempting to escape a pursuing fleet of Royal Navy ships, who desire to avenge the deaths of 1,412 men in the sinking of the flagship and "pride of the Royal Navy", HMS Hood. The game received positive reviews upon release; critics praised the graphics and presentation, though one reviewer found difficulty with the controls.

== Gameplay ==
The Bismarck must evade the pursuing Royal Navy fleet by either heading to Iceland or Nazi occupied France.

The game is a turn-based strategy and takes place during the Last battle of the battleship Bismarck on 27 May 1941. The battle is a sequel to the Battle of the Denmark Strait, in which the Kriegsmarine ships Bismarck and Prinz Eugen sank the Royal Navy flagship, HMS Hood, resulting in the deaths of 1,412 men. Incensed by the loss of the "pride of the Royal Navy", a large British force was dispatched in order to pursue and destroy the Bismarck and its support ship, the Prinz Eugen.

The player has the option to choose which side they wish to command at the beginning of the game. If the German side is picked, the objective of the game is to evade the Royal Navy fleet by either sailing to Iceland or heading to the safety of Nazi occupied France. The player will only have the ability to control the Bismarck itself, and must defend themselves against Royal Navy and Royal Air Force attacks if compromised. If the British side is chosen, then the player must command the hunting Royal Navy fleet in order to search and destroy the Bismarck. To achieve both these ends, the player will be able to access an in-game command centre, which will give out alerts depending on the side chosen. If controlling the Bismarck, the player will be reported of hostile British U-boat sightings. If controlling the Royal Navy fleet, they will be told of radio intercepts, which will pinpoint the Bismarck's approximate location.

A diagrammatic representation is displayed once any ship comes into contact with the enemy.

If the Bismarck has been intercepted or compromised by Royal Navy ships, the game will automatically shift to an arcade sequence which will give the player an opportunity to defend the ship against a British attack, or alternatively, if playing as the British, the sequence is utilised in order to destroy the Bismarck. The feature can be displayed at any time, though it is automatically enabled if either side comes into conflict. The interface of the feature is split into three sections; the upper part of the screen shows a view of the ocean in front of the ship and any hostile ship in the vicinity. The middle section contains buttons and icons which are used to control ship movement and to fire weapons. The lower part of the screen displays a diagrammatic representation of the ship from the side chosen (Bismarck or Royal Navy ships); the diagram will change colours once the ship receives damage from shelling.

Once a hostile ship is in range, the player will have the choice to either open fire or outmanoeuvre the enemy. The Bismarck is able to withstand 99 points of damage; internal fires may break out during battle and will risk destroying the ship if the fires are not contained quickly enough or if they reach fuel tanks. If fires occur, the player is given the option to order fire-fighting crews to contain the blaze, although it will cause the ship to disengage from combat. The game proceeds in real time, and has the option to change speed from slow to fast at any time.

== Reception ==
Reception

Review scores
Publication	Score
Crash	7/10
Computer and Video Games	8/10
Your Sinclair	7/10
Sinclair User	4/5
Computer Gamer	84%

The game received positive reviews upon release. Peter Berlin of Your Sinclair praised the presentation of the game, stating that it was "good to look at" and well organised. Philippa Irving of Crash asserted that the graphics and interface were "rather bland" but "pretty". Despite stating that the map of the game was "unexciting", Irving noted that it was offset by "pretty touches" and new graphical additions. A reviewer of Computer and Video Games stated that the game was "historically good". Their only criticism was the unsuitability of using a joystick for the game, which they deemed "virtually unusable". David Buckingham of Computer Gamer considered Bismarck the best game Personal Software Studios had released at the time, and added that the two genres of strategy and action work "very well".

Gary Rook of Sinclair User heralded the gameplay as an "exciting" blend of strategy and arcade simulation. Berlin suggested that Bismarck was a good introduction for players who were "bored" with the arcade genre and preferred "something a little bit tougher". Irving praised the gameplay as smoothly-presented and "undemanding", stating that the type of game Personal Software Studios were creating was "successful". She also considered the rules of the game to be detailed in all important respects, well-presented and "helpful", albeit "not voluminous". Regarding the arcade aspect of the game, Rook noted that the level of action in it was sufficient, but was sceptical that it was a "true" wargame.

== See also ==
- Bismarck – 1962 board game based on the Bismarck's last battle published by Avalon Hill
- Computer Bismarck – 1980 video game based on the Bismarck's last battle developed by Strategic Simulations
