= Intrigue! =

1986 video game

- Developer: Kinemation
- Publishers: NA: Spectrum HoloByte; EU: Mirrorsoft
- Platforms: Apple II, Commodore 64/128
- Release: 1986
- Genre: Adventure
- Modes: Single-player, multiplayer

Intrigue! is an adventure video game developed by Kinemation and published by Spectrum HoloByte for Apple II and Commodore 64 in 1986.

== Plot ==
International terrorists are planning to blow up a bomb that spreads a virus called PF13. The player is a private detective set to find and defuse the bomb in Washington, D.C. The game's plot is randomized each playthrough with suspects, motives, and clues different.

== Gameplay ==
The player chooses from text options during exploration and dialog scenes. Close-ups of characters and other images accompany the text during these sequences. The graphics are in monochrome. 360 degree panoramic view of the gameworld is used on the streets and in building interiors. The characters react differently to the player depending on the gender chosen for the detective. Multiplayer is supported up to four players, where each player controls a different detective.

== Reception ==
Reception

Review scores
Publication	Score
ACE	671/1000 (C64)
Aktueller Software Markt	4/8/9/9/9 (C64)
Computer and Video Games	7/7/9 (C64)
Tilt	15/20 (C64, Apple II)
Zzap!64	83% (C64)
Commodore User	9/10 (C64)

Computer and Video Games wrote: "Here is a completely novel game system, with a mixture of cartoon style graphics amid digitised pictures, plus some catchy music, that has taken over a year to reach the UK. What a shame! I wonder why!" Commodore User called it "the most polished and absorbing game". ACE said the graphics are of poor quality, conversations are amusing but limited and concluded that it is "a game for mugs". Zzap!64 called the audiovisual presentation atmospheric and said the game overall is "quite good". Aktueller Software Markt said the graphics are outdated but don't distract from the dense atmosphere. Tilt said there's no apparent difference between the Apple and Commodore versions: both have the same limited graphics but retain "the power of seduction".
