= Battle Master =

1990 video game

- Cover art designed by Chris Achilleos
- Developers: PSS; Nick Pelling (Genesis)
- Publishers: Mirrorsoft; Arena Entertainment (Genesis)
- Designers: Mike Simpson; Simon Jones
- Programmers: Simon Jones; Tony Stoddart
- Platforms: Amiga, Atari ST, MS-DOS, Genesis
- Release: Amiga, Atari ST, MS-DOS 1990; Genesis November 1991
- Genres: Action, strategy
- Mode: Single-player

Battle Master is a 1990 fantasy action adventure game designed by Mike Simpson and Simon Jones for PSS and published by Mirrorsoft. The game is a fantasy adventure in which the player controls a champion who must battle evil forces to conquer four kingdoms, uniting the four kings' crowns and presenting them to the Watcher in order to restore the world to peace.

== Gameplay ==
The Atari ST version of Battle Master (captured from the Steem emulator)

Battle Master is a squad-based action-adventure game viewed from a top-down isometric perspective.

After choosing a race - human, elf, dwarf or orc - and a Dungeons & Dragons-style class - warrior, merchant, archer or mage - the player is presented with a map, from which destinations are chosen. At each destination the player may choose to parley - giving an opportunity to purchase useful items from the destination, rather than having to find them - or may enter the destination.

At this point the player enters the area and must defeat a minimum of 75% of the hostile forces present in order to proceed. Combat is either close-quarters mêlée, using such weapons as swords and clubs, or ranged, using arrows or magic. In addition to the main player character it is possible to recruit up to four followers, who may be given rudimentary formations (row, column, wedge), positions (front, rear) and basic commands (rally). Defeating enemies and proceeding on from an area is the only way to unlock further destinations on the map.

Difficulty increases as the player progresses to new areas; to cope with this players may either find or buy (using looted gold) improved equipment such as armour and weaponry.

== Plot ==
Following an age of conflict between the races of men, elves, dwarves and orcs that destroyed towns and cities and left the land decimated and impoverished, the mysterious Watcher came and settled in the Tower. The Watcher withdrew the power of magic, leaving remnants of magic only in artifacts created before his arrival, and cast a spell of apathy on the four kings. Then he spoke a prophecy: "Where there is chaos there will be order; where discord, harmony will flourish. From the south will come a hero to conquer the land and unite the crowns. Where there were fragments, there will be a whole. then will a new age begin".

== Reception ==
Reception

Review scores
Publication	Score
Amiga Format	83%
ST Format	82%
Zero	81%
Amiga Action	77%
Your Amiga	76%
Zzap!64	58%

Critical reception of Battle Master was mixed, with scores ranging from 58% (Zzap!64) to 83% (Amiga Format) for the Atari ST and Amiga formats of the game. Whilst Amiga Format praised its graphics, "clever design" and "instant and lasting appeal", Zzap!64 criticized it for having "too little depth" and "too little tactical meat", and although ST Format also criticized the graphics it considered its action to be "heart-racing" and its strategy "innovative".
