= Dynamite Dan II =

1986 video game

- Publisher: Mirrorsoft
- Designer: Rod Bowkett
- Programmers: ZX Spectrum; Rod Bowkett; Amstrad CPC; Keith Goodyer
- Platforms: Amstrad CPC, ZX Spectrum
- Release: 1986
- Genre: Platform
- Mode: Single-player

Dynamite Dan II: Dr Blitzen and the Islands of Arcanum is a platform game and the sequel to 1985's Dynamite Dan. It was written for the ZX Spectrum by Rod Bowkett and published by Mirrorsoft. An Amstrad CPC port was released the same year.

== Reception ==
Reception

Awards
Publication	Award
Crash	Crash Smash
Sinclair User	SU Classic
Your Sinclair	Megagame

CRASH gave a 93% review Readers chose it as the best platform game of the year.

Your Sinclair rated it 9 out of 10. Reviewers were impressed with the graphical and sound effect improvements over the original game, and the fun gameplay.
