= Commodore Disk User =

Defunct UK computer magazine

- Issue 1, November/December 1987
- Former editors: Stuart Cooke; Paul Eves
- Categories: Computer magazine
- Frequency: Monthly
- First issue: November 1987
- Final issue Number: October 1991; 36
- Company: Argus Specialist Publications; Alphavite Publications
- Country: United Kingdom
- Based in: London
- Language: English
- ISSN: 0953-0614

Commodore Disk User, also referred to as CDU, was a magazine for the Commodore range of computers, including the Commodore 64, Commodore 128, and Plus/4. Each issue had a cover-mounted disk containing software.

== History ==
Cover mounted disk

It was published in the UK by Argus Specialist Publications which also published the Your Commodore. It was aimed at Commodore users who had a 1541 disk drive and did not want to have to type in program listings. It also meant that larger programs could be included with the magazine. Initially, an issue of the magazine was published every two months but after two years, it became monthly.

The magazine survived until the end of 1991. The last issue (number 36) was cover dated October 1991. Copies were scanned into Archive.org in 2011.
