= J. R. R. Tolkien's Riders of Rohan =

1991 video game

- European cover art
- Developers: Beam Software; Papyrus Design Group
- Publishers: EU: Personal Software Services; NA: Konami, Mirrorsoft
- Designers: Hank Howie; Adam Levesque; Phil Redmond
- Composer: Alice Lei
- Series: Middle-earth
- Platform: MS-DOS
- Release: 1991
- Genre: Strategy
- Mode: Single-player

J. R. R. Tolkien's Riders of Rohan is a video game from 1991 based upon the fictional War of the Ring set in the Middle-earth world created by J. R. R. Tolkien, centered in The Lord of the Rings novels. The massive-scale simulation takes part in the realm of Rohan and the player controls the forces of Good during the onslaught of the forces of Evil, namely centered on the conflict with Saruman of Isengard. It was published by Konami and Mirrorsoft.

== Gameplay ==
Army view

Gameplay is similar to the 1988 War in Middle Earth, except the setting was downsized from the entire world to the land of the Rohirrim, mostly following the story from The Two Towers, and part of the ending in The Return of the King. In a combination of a single-unit adventure, small-scale battlefield tactics and broadscale campaign warfare, the player must coordinate the Fellowship and Rohan's troops to fend off the invasion of Saruman's Orcs and save the Rohirrim lands. The player must also mount enough forces to push the war on the fronts in the east to contribute to Sauron's defeat.

On the main menu screen, the player can start a new game, load an old one, access encyclopedias about units and characters, quit, or practice. The practice folds down to tutorials in single-fighter combat:

Archery: the player takes control of Legolas attempting to shoot down (18) Orcs from a wall, while crouching from their spears.

Duel: the player chooses between four Heroes: Aragorn, Legolas, Gimli and Éomer, to fight either an Orc or a Dunlending in melee combat.

Magic Duel: the player takes control of Gandalf fighting a Nazgûl flying mounted on a Felbeast.

The game begins just before the Battles at the Fords of Isen, with the player taking control of Rohan's western armies (an army consisted of an infantry unit [Westfold Militia], a light cavalry unit [Outriders], a horse archers unit [Harrowdale Bow] and three heavy cavalry units [Helms Deep Guards and Edoras Guards, the Grimslade squadron being under Théodred's personal leadership]). The main army is led by Théodred, while there is a separate unit of heavy cavalry [Harrowdale] that is still behind on the road. The game ends when Sauron is destroyed after the Battle at the Black Gates and Frodo and Sam reach Mount Doom.

== Reception ==
Computer Gaming World called the graphics "simple, yet pleasing", but described it as "a lightweight strategy game that includes several action sequences and some very limited character interaction". The magazine stated that those who had not read Tolkien's books would probably not understand the backstory, and strategic players would dislike how closely they needed to follow the original story's actions to succeed in the game. Computer Gaming World only recommended it to devoted Tolkien fans.

== See also ==
- War in Middle Earth (1988 computer game)
