= Conflict: Europe =

1989 video game

- Developers: Personal Software Services; Ariolasoft (DOS)
- Publisher: PSS/Mirrorsoft
- Platforms: Amiga, Atari ST, MS-DOS
- Release: 1989
- Genre: Turn-based strategy
- Mode: Single-player

Conflict: Europe is a 1989 turn-based strategy video game developed and published by Personal Software Services (PSS) for the Amiga and Atari ST. An MS-DOS port was released later. The game is considered a follow-up to PSS' 8-bit game from 1985, Theatre Europe.

== Gameplay ==
The game presents several scenarios where Anglo-Soviet relationships have deteriorated to the point of open warfare. The player can choose to lead either NATO or the Warsaw Pact in a thirty-day period of hostilities. The main screen displays a map and small monitors for communication and information. The player can choose from options such as nuclear aggression, troop movement, chemical attacks, negotiation, and air control.

Each option has a different screen with specific actions. For example, the nuclear terminal requires an authorisation code and offers choices such as launch fire mission or reflex strike. The diplomatic terminal allows for communication with other countries and presenting peace terms or threats to the enemy. The supply readout helps determine if a weak unit can survive until supplies arrive. The vidiprinter provides reports from army and navy sub divisions. Unit orders are given through the main map screen, which covers Europe and operates on a grid system. Moving the command cursor over a unit and clicking on its destination allows for movement and attacking. Units can move one square per turn, depending on the terrain. The report shows the results of battles, with units either untouched, retreated, or erased from the map. The game ends with a percentage command assessment and the number of civilian casualties.

== Reception ==
Reception

Review scores
Publication	Score
ACE	882/1000 (Amiga)
Aktueller Software Markt	32/48 (Amiga); 33/48 (DOS)
Computer and Video Games	83% (Amiga)
ST Format	84%
The Games Machine (UK)	53% (ST)

Computer and Video Games called the game "[a]n exciting, atmospheric and easy-to-operate war game that will appeal to all computer users." ACE noted the game as "an excellent wargame which should appeal to beginners as well as experienced players". ST Format said the game is "extremely addictive even for players who aren't wargame fanatics". The Games Machine said the game "becomes boring after a while due to repetitive play".
