= Sorcerer Lord =

1987 video game

- Developer: Personal Software Services
- Publisher: Personal Software Services
- Platforms: ZX Spectrum, Amstrad CPC, Commodore 64, Atari ST, Amiga, MS-DOS
- Release: 1987
- Genre: Strategy
- Mode: Single-player

Sorcerer Lord is a turn based strategy-fantasy video game published and developed by Personal Software Services. It was released in 1987 for ZX Spectrum and Amstrad CPC, then ported to the Commodore 64, Atari ST, MS-DOS, and Amiga.

== Plot ==
The game is set in the fictional land of Galanor, which contains three human kingdoms, a forest kingdom of elves, a kingdom of barbarians and two kingdoms of mountain warriors. An invading army commanded by the evil sorcerer, the Shadowlord, is controlled by the computer. The player takes on the role of the Sorcerer lord and must use the forces of the Galanor Alliance under his command to counter this attack.

== Gameplay ==
The human player and the computer take turns to recruit and move troops on a 2D map. The aim of the game for the Sorcerer Lord is to resist the initial attack of the Shadowlords' army and prevent him from holding any Galanor city or any magical Rune Rings for more of 11 days. The game is lost if the Shadowlord takes Galanor's capital city.

The strategy element of the game is enhanced by the unique abilities of soldiers from the different kingdoms. For example, mountain warriors have the advantage of a siege bonus and whilst fighting on mountainous terrain, and some higher ranking human leaders have a magic bonus. Movement bonuses also depend on the terrain; for example Elves can move faster in the forest, whereas barbarians can move faster in desert areas.

The game has a limit of 40 moves in the easy level, and fewer moves in the higher levels.

== Reception ==
Reception

Awards
Publication	Award
Sinclair User	SU Classic
Your Sinclair	Megagame

Ken St. Andre gave the game a positive review in Computer Gaming World, calling it a "fantasy wargamer's delight", albeit a very difficult game. He noted the exclusive use of the numeric keys for movement made it easy to make mistakes with. St. Andre also lamented the simple victory message upon winning or losing the game.
