= Firezone =

1988 video game

- Developer: Arcadia
- Publisher: Personal Software Services
- Platforms: Amstrad CPC, Commodore 64, Amiga, Atari ST, MS-DOS
- Release: 1988
- Genre: Computer wargame
- Modes: Single-player, multiplayer

Firezone is a 1988 computer wargame developed by Arcadia and published by Personal Software Services (PSS) for the Amstrad CPC. It is part of PSS' Wargamers series. Ports for Commodore 64, Amiga, Atari ST, and MS-DOS were released later.

== Gameplay ==
Firezone is a turn-based strategy game played on a hexagonal grid and is set in the 21st century during a war between the superpowers of the Pacific Combine and the European League. On their turn, the player can move a unit or fire at the enemy. The damage values are left to random chance. The objective of the game is to destroy all enemies on the map or force them to retreat. The game features sci-fi concepts like grav tanks and beam weapons. The disk version comes with nine scenarios, cassette version comes with three. A scenario designer is also included. A two-player multiplayer is supported. The DOS version supports CGA and EGA graphics modes.

== Reception ==
Reception

Review scores
Publication	Score
ACE	710/1000 (CPC); 734/1000 (ST); 735/1000 (Amiga)
Aktueller Software Markt	39/60 (ST)
Amiga User International	8/10
Amstrad Action	64%
Tilt	14/20 (DOS)
The Australian Commodore and Amiga Review	85/100 (Amiga)
Datormagazin	3/10 (Amiga)
DOS International	7/10
Génération 4	84% (Amiga, ST)
.info	3/5 (C64)
Jeux & Stratégie	7/10 (DOS, ST)

ACE reviewed the Amstrad CPC version and said that "[w]hile the display is colourful, the screen updating is tediously slow, as the screen is re-drawn rather than scrolled." The review was concluded: "A simple wargame then that provides a nice design feature and a vicious computer opponent but not much else." Amstrad Action said the sound and graphics are simple, the play area is too small, and each scenario is over too quickly. In a review of the Amiga version, ACE noted that the "scrolling and sound effects are much better than the 8-bit versions [...]" .info said: "Wargames come and wargames go, and Firezone will be no memorable than most of the rest, but it's a pleasant enough diversion to burn up a few afternoons." Amiga User International concluded: "The game is simple to play, but is nevertheless addictive in its qualities". The Australian Commodore and Amiga Review noted the game as very user friendly and the overall presentation as excellent. The game was said to be "[a] good introductory game for newcomers, which still provides experienced veterans with a serious challenge." Datormagazin didn't recommended to buy the game since there are much better strategy games on the Amiga.
