= Annals of Rome =

1986 turn-based strategy video game

- Amiga cover art
- Developer: Personal Software Services
- Publisher: Personal Software Services
- Platforms: ZX Spectrum, Amstrad CPC, Commodore 64, Atari ST, Amiga, MS-DOS, Amstrad PCW
- Release: 1986
- Genre: Strategy
- Mode: Single-player

Annals of Rome is a turn-based strategy video game developed and published by Personal Software Services. It was first released in the United Kingdom for the ZX Spectrum, Amstrad CPC and Atari ST in 1986. It was then released in Germany for the Commodore 64 and Amiga in 1987 and 1988, respectively. The game is set in the Late Roman Empire, with the objective being to survive for as long as possible against rebelling European states.

== Gameplay ==
Gameplay screenshot (Atari ST)

The game is played in two windows. The first is the troops movement window, which allows the player to control the placement of troops in the Roman state or to attack computer players. This window shows the number of forces for all players, inflation, popularity and national score of the Roman state, and human player score. The last step for the player in this window is to set the tax rate, between 1.0 and 2.0% (higher taxes cause higher inflation). In the next window, the player decides which of the 21 Senate members will receive command of the various Roman armies. To help the player in making this decision, all Senate members are listed with numbers, the first two indicating their military ability and loyalty, respectively. The last number indicates their age. If the government's popularity falls below 2 (popularity is measured within a range between -5 and +5), armies with disloyal commanders can revolt and try to take Rome. If this happens before 50 BC, the successful rebel will be declared dictator, and if this happens after, he will become emperor, which will lead to a dynasty.

== Reception ==
Reception

Review scores
Publication	Score
Crash	85%
Your Sinclair	40%

Despite poor graphics and interface even for 1986, Annals of Rome received an 85% rating from Crash magazine in 1987. In November 1986, Popular Computing Weekly called the game a "perfect choice if you take your strategy games seriously". Because of such popularity, the game received conversion to all computer platforms in its day. Originally, Personal Software Services released the game for C-64, Spectrum, Amstrad CPC and Atari ST (platforms until September 1987) followed by versions for PC and Amiga.

Computer Gaming World gave the game a positive review, noting innovative mechanics such as the variable turn length. The review noted that the game felt unfinished and unpolished, citing the lack of victory conditions and poor save mechanism. In 1990 the magazine gave the game three-plus out of five stars, stating that despite the poor graphics and seemingly incomplete nature, "it succeeds on many levels", especially the superior 16-bit versions. In 1993 the magazine gave the game two-plus stars. Orson Scott Card wrote in Compute! that Annals of Rome's programmers did an excellent job of recreating Roman history, but that sales would suffer because it "looks like it was programmed in the Bronze Age".
