= Falklands '82 =

1986 video game

- Commodore 64 cover art
- Developer: Personal Software Services
- Publisher: Personal Software Services
- Designer: John Bethell
- Series: Strategic Wargames
- Platforms: ZX Spectrum, Commodore 64
- Release: UK: 1986
- Genre: Turn-based strategy
- Mode: Single-player

Falklands '82 (released as Malvinas '82 in Spanish markets) is a 1986 turn-based strategy video game developed and published by Personal Software Services for the ZX Spectrum and Commodore 64. The game is set during the 1982 Falklands War and revolves around the Argentine occupation and subsequent British re-capture of the Falkland Islands. The player controls the British Task Force as they must either defeat all Argentine forces on the archipelago or re-capture every settlement.

A port for the Amstrad CPC was advertised but never released. During development, the developers obtained information and statistics of the war from NATO. The game met with mixed reviews and controversy: critics praised the detailed graphics, but some were divided over the gameplay and authenticity; others criticised the in-game potential of an Argentine "victory".

== Gameplay ==
A map showing the battles in northern East Falkland

Falklands '82 is a turn-based strategy game focusing on land battles during the Falklands War. The player commands the British Task Force against the Argentine ground forces, who are occupying the islands. The game begins by allocating fifteen Royal Navy ships for the task force; a proportionate amount must be devoted for attack and defence purposes. The player must then choose one of four landing spots in northern East Falkland to begin the invasion: Port Stanley, Berkeley Sound, Cow Bay and San Carlos Bay. The SAS or SBS are available throughout the game to provide intelligence on Argentine movements; however, intelligence is limited and may only be collected a certain number of times. At any time, the player may request reinforcements from either one of the two aircraft carriers, HMS Hermes or HMS Invincible.

The main objective of the game is to either defeat all occupying Argentine forces in the archipelago, or to capture and hold all ten settlements of the Falklands simultaneously. Depending on the difficulty setting, the game lasts 25 or 30 turns; if every settlement has not been occupied or any Argentine forces remain by the end of the last turn, the game will end. The capital of the Falklands, Stanley, has the highest concentration of Argentine forces. There are a total of four choices for combat: attack, move, pass, and "recce". The game includes a weather system that changes from every turn and provides obstructions for various forces. For example, stormy seas will temporarily render naval vessels and troop reinforcements unavailable, while fog will render both naval and air forces unavailable.

Text alerting the player that one of the Royal Navy ships has been sunk

During the course of the game, Argentine airstrikes will frequently sink Royal Navy ships, depending on how many of them were initially allocated to defensive positions. In addition, Argentine air forces will occasionally bomb and destroy British forces on the ground, which are represented as animated sprites on the map. The map also displays terrain details, including rivers and mountains. If troops are situated on top of a mountain, they will receive a defensive bonus once attacked; however, due to the steep terrain, they will move more slowly. If the player chooses to enter an enemy-controlled zone, the move will instantly end, leaving the unit vulnerable to an Argentine attack.

== Background and release ==
In Falklands '82, we were attacked for having a game where the Argies could win - but it could have happened.

— Richard Cockayne in an interview with Your Computer magazine in 1986

During development of both games, Cockayne and Mays obtained statistics for both the Cold War and Falklands War from NATO and the Soviet embassy in London. In an interview with Your Computer magazine, Richard Cockayne stated that both Theatre Europe and Falklands '82 received heavy criticism from the Campaign for Nuclear Disarmament and The Sun newspaper, respectively. An editor from The Sunday Press suggested that Falklands '82 was "distasteful" because of the game's possibility of an Argentine victory. The game was planned for an Amstrad CPC port, but was never released for that computer. In Spanish markets, the game was released as Malvinas '82, the Spanish name for the Falkland Islands.

== Reception ==
Reception

Review scores
Publication	Score
Crash	3/10
Your Sinclair	8/10
Sinclair User	4/5
Zzap!64	34%

Falklands '82 was criticised for including a scenario where "Argentina could win," but Cockayne maintained that his company's video games did not trivialise the war. The game received mostly positive reviews from critics upon release. Rachael Smith of Your Sinclair praised the overall experience of the gameplay, stating that it was "ideal" for newcomers and plays "smooth"; however, she criticised it for being "annoyingly slow" at times. Sean Masterson of Crash criticised the gameplay, stating that it fails to "offer a serious challenge" and prohibits the player from experimenting with choices the real commanders never had, such as planning tactical air strikes. A reviewer from Sinclair User praised the gameplay, stating that it was "swift" and had "nice touches" for beginners to the wargame genre. He sarcastically remarked that the inability to play on the Argentine side would help improve Anglo-Argentinian relations. A reviewer from Zzap!64 criticised the game's lack of authenticity and strategy, stating that the developer's previous games had more credence if the player "played them with their eyes shut".

M. Evan Brooks reviewed the game for Computer Gaming World, and stated that "While Iwo/Falklands may not be to the taste of the experienced wargamer, they may prove just the ticket to gaining another convert to computer conflict simulations."

A reviewer from ZX Computing heralded the graphics and details of the map but suggested that "hardened wargamers" would not be interested in graphical advancements. A reviewer from Computer Gamer praised its simplicity, stating that it was a "simple game" and would prove to be an "excellent" introduction to the wargame strategy genre. In a 1994 survey of wargames Computer Gaming World gave the title one star out of five, stating that "it has aged poorly".

In a retrospective review, Tim Stone of Rock, Paper, Shotgun praised the game's ability to display the war in a neutral manner; however, he questioned the inability to play on the Argentine side. Stone concluded that the game had "greater significance" over other war strategy games at the time and had an "undeniable quality".
