= Pegasus Bridge (video game) =

1987 video game

- Amstrad CPC cover art
- Developers: Personal Software Services; Data Design Systems (Spectrum, CPC)
- Publisher: Personal Software Services
- Designer: John Bethell
- Series: Wargamers
- Platforms: ZX Spectrum, Amstrad CPC, Commodore 64
- Release: UK: 1987
- Genre: Turn-based strategy
- Mode: Single-player

Pegasus Bridge is a turn-based strategy video game developed and published by Personal Software Services. It was released exclusively in the United Kingdom for the ZX Spectrum, Amstrad CPC and Commodore 64 in 1987. The game is set during the landings in Normandy on D-Day in the Second World War and revolves around the British 6th Airborne Division's attempts to secure a bridge over the Caen Canal.

The player can assume control of either British or German forces, in which gameplay of Pegasus Bridge focuses on British forces securing various locations in Normandy or German forces defending the area from the attacking British. The game received mixed reviews upon release, with praise being directed at its "attractive" graphics, however a major bug which caused the game to crash was discovered during one reviewer's initial testing.

== Gameplay ==
In this screenshot, the player selects landing sites for the British 6th Airborne Division in Normandy

The game is a turn-based strategy and revolves around the British 6th Airborne Division's attempts to secure Bénouville Bridge (later renamed Pegasus Bridge, in honour of the battle) over the Caen Canal during the Normandy landings on 5 June 1944. The player is able to command either the British or German side in the game. Regardless of the side chosen, British units will not appear on the map at the beginning of the game as the British 6th Airborne Division have not yet made their parachute drops. German forces are distributed around the four far corners of the map, with a few units positioned near Bénouville Bridge. If playing as the British, the objective is to defeat all German forces and secure all bridges in the area, with the capture or destruction of the Merville Battery being the ultimate goal. If playing as the Germans, the only objective is to hold off all British attacks for 18 hours, which is the equivalent to 36 in-game turns.

Pegasus Bridge features ten different types of terrain, which affect the movement of the troops and the defensibility of certain areas. If units are situated in towns or woodland areas, their attacks will be less effective. High wind speeds will also render British parachuting troops temporarily ineffective. Units on the map are presented as small squares and can be stacked together to increase defence. While British forces may destroy various bridges throughout the game, certain bridges such as those over the Caen Canal and Orne river must be preserved in order to win the game.

== Reception ==
Reception

Review scores
Publication	Score
Crash	78%
Computer and Video Games	8/10
Your Sinclair	4/10

The game received mixed reviews upon release. Owen Bishop of Your Sinclair found a major bug during testing of the game which caused the game to crash, and ultimately affected his experience, stating that "being Brits [we] were obviously too gentlemanly to take advantage of such a situation". Bishop also criticised the high speed at which the in-game messages flash as "excessive". Philippa Irving of Crash criticised the presentation of the game, saying that the "annoying" key action ruined playability and that its controls were limited by a cursor. However, Irving praised its graphics and historical accuracy, stating that it was "attractive" yet "unatmospheric" and clearly based on the historical situation. A reviewer of Computer and Video Games called it an "excellent game", and praised its value for money. However, the reviewer criticised the "slow moving" pace of the game, as opposed to the fast tempo of the historical battle.
