= Legend of the Sword =

1988 video game

- Developer: Silicon Software
- Publisher: Rainbird Software
- Designers: Karl Buckingham; Colin Mongardi; Eugene Messina
- Platforms: Atari ST, Amiga, MS-DOS
- Release: 1988
- Genre: Interactive fiction
- Mode: Single-player

Legend of the Sword is a 1988 fantasy interactive fiction video game developed by Silicon Soft and published by Rainbird Software for the Atari ST. Ports for the Amiga and MS-DOS were released later. A Macintosh version was expected to release shortly after the Atari ST version but was never released. A sequel, The Final Battle, was released in 1990.

== Plot ==
The lands of Anar have been invaded by the forces of an evil wizard, Suzar. In times past, a magical sword and shield guarded the inhabitants. The player character and his party set out to search for the items in order to stop the wizard.

== Gameplay ==
The interface is divided into four areas, the top left is used for images which change depending the situation, the top right is the scrolling map area, the middle shows the movement commands and hitpoints which are depicted as a burning candle. The bottom third of the screen is used for text display.

== Development ==
Legend of the Sword was in development for over two years. The development started when Karl Buckingham decided to write a novel about a dream he had. When talking to Colin Mongardi, he decided to write it as a video game instead. He hadn't played an adventure game before and after playing The Pawn, decided his game wasn't going to have any vague puzzles. Silicon Soft was based in Eastbourne, England and was set up under the Enterprise Allowance Scheme. The game was designed by a three-person team of Buckingham, Mongardi, and Eugene Messina for the Amstrad CPC. When finished, they contacted publisher Mastertronic but didn't like their offhand approach to the game. Next was Rainbird which required a 16-bit version because they thought an Amstrad version wouldn't sell, also an additional six months of development time was requested by the publisher in collaboration with their development team. The game was then remade for the Atari ST and written in the C programming language.

== Reception ==
Reception

Review scores
Publication	Score
Aktueller Software Markt	49/60 (ST); 46/60 (DOS)
Amiga User International	10/10
Computer and Video Games	33/40 (ST)
The Games Machine (UK)	91% (ST)
Zzap!64	87% (Amiga)
Power Play	6.5/10 (ST)
Your Amiga	59/100

Computer and Video Games said the parser is not up to Infocom standard but concluded that the game "should establish Silicon Soft as among the best of adventure producers [...] The Games Machine said "[t]he screen layout and control of the game are what make Legend of the Sword work so well". Amiga User International praised the parser as "a delight" and also commended the game's "sheer playability" and user friendliness. Your Amiga called it "a competent and good-looking adventure" but said it is "treading some well-hallowed but tired ground".
