= Star Trek V: The Final Frontier (computer game) =

1989 video game

- Developer: Mindscape
- Publisher: Mindscape
- Series: Star Trek
- Platform: DOS
- Release: September 1989

Star Trek V: The Final Frontier is a 1989 video game published by Mindscape.

== Gameplay ==
Star Trek V: The Final Frontier is a game in which the crew of the Enterprise voyages to the planet of Sha Ka Ree as seen in the film Star Trek V: The Final Frontier.

== Reception ==
John Harrington reviewed Star Trek V: The Final Frontier for Games International magazine, and gave it 2 stars out of 5, and stated that "Despite the graphics and the very familiar subject matter, it is not particularly addictive. It is, perhaps, a bit too cerebral for your average shoot-em-up fan and probably a little too reliant on arcade adventure to appeal to the adult market."

Charles Ardai reviewed the game for Computer Gaming World, and stated that "It could have been so much more, though, than ten minutes of excitement followed by twenty years in a display case. That it isn't, especially with so much going for it, is a true pity."

Jim Trunzo reviewed Star Trek V: The Final Frontier in White Wolf #21 (June/July 1990), rating it a 3 out of 5 and stated that "Star Trek V: The Final Frontier isn't the paragon of game design, but the segments that are enjoyable when coupled with the see-to-believe graphics make this program worth having, even if you're not a die-hard trekkie."
