= Argus Press =

Argus Press was a British publishing company. It was acquired by British Electric Traction (BET) in 1966, and became the publishing arm of that company. It was the subject of one of the most hotly contested management buyouts of the 1980s when a management team led by Kimble Earl, George Fowkes, and Scott Smith secured financing of £207m from forty national and international banks to acquire the UK and US businesses from BET. The acquisition was of particular note as the publisher Robert Maxwell was among the rival bidders, and widely considered as capable of out-witting the management team. Only an eleventh-hour intervention by Earl – exposing members of Maxwell's secret consortium as rival newspaper publishers which meant Maxwell would fall foul of the Monopolies Commission – brought success for the management team. The new company traded under the name of Team Argus. Its portfolio of businesses included the largest group of paid-for and free weekly newspapers in the UK, an extensive range of business titles in the UK and the USA, and a group of specialist hobby-interest magazines in the UK. Team Argus businesses were sold off to various buyers during the early 1990s.

== Argus Newspapers ==
The newspaper division of the company, Argus Newspapers, was built up into the UK's largest group of weekly paid and free newspapers during the 1970s and 1980s by chairman Norman Richards and his successor Kimble Earl. Their philosophy was to act under the radar, shunning publicity whilst they acquired and launched throughout London and Southern England. They were renowned for cutting unnecessary costs whilst insisting on competent editorial coverage, believing it to be the only reason the public would continue buying or reading. At its peak, the group published and printed over a million copies per week. Argus Newspapers were pioneers in the joint-publishing of paid and free newspapers in the same town. Among the titles were Reading Chronicle, Surrey Mirror, Sutton Herald, Walthamstow Guardian, South London Press and The Crawley News.

Argus Newspapers was purchased by Trinity International Holdings (later Trinity Mirror) in 1993, who immediately sold a number of titles to other provincial press publishers.

== Argus Specialist Publications ==
The hobby magazine division of the company was Argus Specialist Publications. Among its titles were several devoted to model engineering, photography, woodworking, and other hobbies and interests. It published several computer magazines for popular Home computers including Commodore Disk User (November 1987 – October 1991), Your Commodore (October 1984 – October 1991), Computer Gamer (April 1985 – June 1987), and ZX Computing (1982–1987).

The business was based in Hemel Hempstead, and following the management buyout from BET in 1988 was run by chairman Kimble Earl and MD Terry Pattison. The operation included a book publisher and an exhibition business which staged hobby-related shows of national importance at venues including Alexandra Palace, Sandown Park and Olympia. Argus Press Group sold the business to Nexus in 1994.

== Argus Consumer Publications ==
Argus Press Group ran a significant portfolio of consumer magazines from premises adjacent to London's Leicester Square. These included Mother & Baby, Mother, Slimming and True Story. The business was run by chairman Kimble Earl and MD Gill Butler from the Argus Press management buyout in 1988 until being sold to EMAP in 1991. The division also owned a chain of slimming clubs and a retail magazine distribution business SMD.

== Argus Business Publications ==
This business was a major player in business-to-business publications in both the UK and the USA, with publishing centres in Redhill, Surrey, and in Atlanta, Denver, Clarksdale, Mississippi and others. Titles served a wide range of commercial sectors including mining, duty-free trading, electronics, and agriculture. The chief executive of the division was George Fowkes, who looked after the UK business publications with Scott Smith reporting to him for the US division. All titles were sold during 1994-1995.

== Argus Press Software ==
The software division, Argus Press Software, was active in the 1980s, producing games for several home computer systems of the time. It acquired Quicksilva and Starcade in 1984, Bug-Byte in 1985, and also published titles by the wargame company MC Lothlorien. In 1987, Argus Press Software was purchased by its managing director, Stephen Hall, and renamed Grandslam Entertainment.
