= Fun School =

- Logo
- Genre: Edutainment
- Developers: Database Publications (1984); Database Educational Software (1989); Europress Software (1992)
- Publishers: Database Publications (1984); Database Educational Software (1989); Europress Software (1991)
- Creators: Derek Meakin; Meash Meakin; Peter Davidson
- Platforms: 1989-1994; Acorn Electron, BBC Micro, ZX Spectrum, Commodore 64, Amstrad CPC, Atari ST, Amiga, MS-DOS; 1995-1998; Windows
- First release: Fun School; 1984
- Latest release: Fun School 7; 1998

Fun School is a series of educational packages developed and published in the United Kingdom by Europress Software, initially as Database Educational Software. The original Fun School titles were sold mostly by mail order via off-the-page adverts in the magazines owned by Database Publications. A decision was made to create a new set of programs, call the range Fun School 2, and package them more professionally so they could be sold in computer stores around the UK. Every game comes as a set of three versions, each for a specific age range.

== Fun School ==
Fun School is the first set of educational games, created in 1984 by Database Educational Software for the Acorn Electron and BBC Micro computers. The three individual games catered for children aged under 6 years, between 6 and 8 years and over 8 years respectively. They also include five children's nursery rhymes. The products were tested in classrooms and were educationally approved.

Under 5 years	Ages 5–8	8-12 years
Numbers; Pelican; Counting; House; Magic Garden; Match Maker; Seaside; Snap; Colours; Alphabet	Derrick; Castle; Freds Words; Hilo; Maths Test; Mouser; Number Signs; Seawall; Super Spell; Balance	Anagrams; Code Breakers; Hangman; Dogduckcorn; Tower-Hanoi; Maths Hike; Guessing; Odd Man Out; Nim; Pelmanism

== Fun School 2 ==
Fun School 2 is the second set of educational games, created in 1989 by Database Educational Software. It was released on more computers than its predecessor including Acorn Electron, BBC Micro, ZX Spectrum, Commodore 64, Amstrad CPC, Atari ST, Amiga, MS-DOS and RISC OS. The three individual games catered for children aged under 6 years, between 6 and 8 years and over 8 years respectively.

Fun School 2: Under 6 Years

Review scores
Publication	Score
Amstrad Action	89% (Amstrad CPC)
Your Sinclair	89% (ZX Spectrum)
Amstar	14/20 (Amstrad CPC)
Commodore Format	62% (C64)

Fun School 2: Ages 6-8

Review scores
Publication	Score
Amstrad Action	89% (Amstrad CPC)
Your Sinclair	89% (ZX Spectrum)
Commodore Format	60% (C64)

Fun School 2: Over 8 Years

Review scores
Publication	Score
Amstrad Action	89% (Amstrad CPC)
Your Sinclair	89% (ZX Spectrum)
Commodore Format	64% (C64)

The Fun School 2 games were programmed using the STOS (derived from BASIC) programming language with the STOS Compiler Engine.

Fun School 2 was reviewed as "The number one choice for our school" by Shelley Gibson. Fun School 2 was rated 3rd place in the "Gallup full-price software chart". Commodore Force rated Fun School 2 for Under 6 Years as #43, Fun School 2 Ages 6–8 as #36 and Fun School 2 Over 8 Years as number 10 in rankings of the top 100 Commodore 64 games of 1993. Despite its popularity among children, Fun School 2 was criticized by left-wing educationalists due to a competition element and the matter was brought to British MP Kenneth Baker.

Under 6 Years	Ages 6–8	Over 8 Years
Find the Mole; Teddy Count; Colour Train; Pick a Letter; Teddy Bears Picnic; Shape Snap; Spell a word; Pick a Letter	Number Train; Shopping; Maths Maze; Treasure Hunt; Bounce; Packing; Caterpillar; Number Jump	Logic Doors; Souvenirs; Bridge; Unicorn Quest; Code Boxes; Guardians; Machine; Escape

== Fun School 3 ==
Fun school 3: Under 5 Years

Review scores
Publication	Score
Crash	84% (ZX Spectrum)
Amiga CD32 Gamer	80% (Amiga)
CPC Attack!	90% (Amstrad CPC)
8000 Plus	18/20 (Amstrad PCW)
ST Format	91%(Atari ST)

Fun school 3: Ages 5-7

Review scores
Publication	Score
Amstrad Action	90% (Amstrad CPC)
Crash	86% (ZX Spectrum)
CPC Attack!	90% (Amstrad CPC)
8000 Plus	4/5 (Amstrad PCW)
ST Format	94%(Atari ST)

Fun school 3: Over 7 Years

Review scores
Publication	Score
Amstrad Action	92% (Amstrad CPC)
CPC Attack!	90% (Amstrad CPC)
ST Format	90%(Atari ST)

Fun School 3 is the third set of educational games, created in 1990 by Database Educational Software released for the ZX Spectrum, BBC Micro, Commodore 64, Amstrad CPC, Amstrad PCW, Atari ST, Amiga, Amiga CD32, MS-DOS and RISC OS computers. The three individual games catered for children aged under 5 years, between 5 and 7 years and over 7 years respectively. The games and their age ranges took in to full account of the new National Curriculum and the school syllabus content at the time.

The Fun School 3 games were developed using the STOS (derived from BASIC) programming language with the STOS Compiler Engine. For the Amiga version it was converted to AMOS using the AMOS Compiler by William Cochrane and Peter Hickman.

The Amiga version was hosted on the "Commodore 1990 Christmas" talk show along with AMOS 3D. The Amstrad PCW version won the European Computer Leisure Award as "Best Home Education Package" and also got the 8000 Plus Seal of Approval.

Under 5 Years	Ages 5–7	Over 7 Years
Matching; Actions; Gallery; Counting; Letters; Painting	Journey; Collect; Toyshop; Electricity; Funtext; Time	Wordsearch; Robot Draw; Planet Maths; Treasure; Database; Sentences

== Fun School 4 ==
Fun School 4: Under 5 Years

Review scores
Publication	Score
Amstrad Action	93% (Amstrad CPC)
Crash	86% (ZX Spectrum)
Sinclair User	80% (ZX Spectrum)
Your Sinclair	9/10 (ZX Spectrum)
CPC Attack!	90% (Amstrad CPC)
CU Amiga	4/5 (Amiga)
ST Format	82% (Atari ST)
Commodore Format	75% (C64)

Fun School 4: Ages 5-7

Review scores
Publication	Score
Amstrad Action	93% (Amstrad CPC)
Crash	86% (ZX Spectrum)
Sinclair User	81% (ZX Spectrum)
Your Sinclair	8/10 (ZX Spectrum)
Zzap!64	79% (C64)
CPC Attack!	90% (Amstrad CPC)
ST Format	82% (Atari ST)
Commodore Format	68% (C64)

Fun School 4: Ages 7-11

Review scores
Publication	Score
Amstrad Action	93% (Amstrad CPC)
Crash	85% (ZX Spectrum)
Sinclair User	83% (ZX Spectrum)
Your Sinclair	84% (ZX Spectrum)
Zzap!64	82% (C64)
CPC Attack!	90% (Amstrad CPC)
CU Amiga	4/5 (Amiga)
ST Format	82% (Atari ST)
Commodore Format	70% (C64)

Fun School 4 is the fourth set of educational games, released in 1991 by Europress Software (formerly called Database Educational Software) and released on the ZX Spectrum, Amstrad CPC, Commodore 64, Atari ST, Amiga, MS-DOS and RISC OS computers. The three individual games catered for children aged under 5 years, between 5 and 7 years and between 7 and 11 years respectively. The content of the games matched the educational material taught in schools of England and Wales in accordance with the National Curriculum. During the planning stages, an education competition was held by ST Format, in which the best entries were incorporated in the game.

The Amiga version of the Fun School 4 games were mostly created with the AMOS code using the AMOS Compiler engine. TimeTable and Exchange Rates were written in asembler, this was primarily due to the complex nature of these two games and wanting to keep the performance up to an acceptable level.

Under 5 Years	Ages 5–7	Ages 7–11
Addition; Teddy Paint; Fun Train; Teddy's House; Teddy's Karaoke; Teddy's Books	Library; Basketball; Shopkeeper; Log Cabin; Opposites; Typing	Proportions; Spy Quiz; Exchange Rates; Timetable; Spy Travels; Desert Dates

== Fun School Specials ==
Fun School Specials is a set of educational games, created in 1993 by Europress Software, consisting of four different games. Upon demand, Europress designed each game specifically with a certain major topic to add depth to spelling, maths, creativity and science, respectively and comply fully with the National Curriculum.

=== Paint and Create ===
Paint and Create was released on Commodore 64, Amiga and MS-DOS computers and has an easy interface divided into six activities aimed at younger audiences to do their own artwork.

Paint and Create got good review scores including 91% from Commodore Format and 94% from the CU Amiga magazine. It also got awarded the Screenstar from Amiga Reviews.

=== Spelling Fair ===
Spelling Fair was released on Commodore 64, Amiga and MS-DOS computers.

=== Merlin's Maths ===
Merlin's Maths was released on Amiga and MS-DOS computers. Merlin's Maths teaches mathematics on the topics of counting, decimals, fractions and volumes within six activities.

=== Young Scientist ===
Young Scientist was created in 1995 and released on CD for Windows and Macintosh to teach science in depth. The game stars the main character Ozzie S. Otter and has up to forty scientific experiments to try out.

Publication	Paint & Create	Spelling Fair	Merlin's Maths	Young Scientist
Commodore Format	91% (C64)	90% (C64)		
CU Amiga	94% (Amiga)	84% (Amiga)	79% (Amiga)	
Amiga Format		87% (Amiga)		
Amiga Joker		18% (Amiga)		

Paint & Create (Ages 5 to 11)	Merlin's Maths (Ages 7 to 11)	Spelling Fair (Ages 7 to 13)	Young Scientist (Ages 5 to 9)
Interactive Intro; Make a Monster; Card Creator; Art Alive; Jigsaw; Music Maestro	Crystal Conference; Perfect Potions; Decisive Data; Broken Battlements; Magic Machine; Weight Weapons	Coconut Shy; Test Your Strength; Mechanical Grab; Circus Word; Haunted House; Word Juggle	

== Fun School 5 ==
Fun School 5 is the fifth set of educational games, released in 1995 by Europress Software on Windows. The games were originally planned to be released in 1993 with the age ranges 'Under 5s', '5s to 7s' and '7s to 11s', but there was a delay due to the development of the subject-specific Fun School Specials. The games were written using DOS 4GW and early versions had problems with some video drivers, forcing Europress to recall an entire stock before revising new versions. The three individual games catered for children aged between 4 and 7 years, between 6 and 9 years and between 8 and 11 years respectively and had their own specific themes with a goal to complete the game. The games introduced two children, Suki and Rik, and their pet purple dinosaur, Gloopy. The player has to assist Gloopy and the children in solving a number of challenges.

Dreamland (Ages 4–7)	Space (Ages 6–9)	Time (Ages 8–11)
Number Town; Paint Book; Watery Word; Music Box; Tell Time	Blobtastic; Get Lost; Ecology Factory; Taxi; Paint It	Cave School; Farming; Maths Maze; Roller Coaster; Paint

Fun School 5: Dreamland (Ages 4–7)

Award
Publication	Award
PC Plus	Gold Award

== Fun School 6 ==
Fun School 6 is the sixth set of educational games, created in 1996 by Europress Software released on Windows. The three individual games catered for children aged between 4 and 7 years, between 6 and 9 years and between 8 and 11 years respectively and had their own specific themes but each of the five topics remained in the same category with certain variations related to the age level. The games star Gloopy from Fun School 5, this time a pink dinosaur.

Fairyland (Ages 4–7)	Magicland (Ages 6–9)	Futureland (Ages 8–11)
Maths; English; Science; Art; Music	Maths; English; Science; Music; Art	Maths; English; Science; Music; Art

== Fun School 7 ==
Fun School 7 is the seventh and final set of educational games, created in 1998 by CBL Technology and released on Windows. The three individual games catered for children aged between 4 and 7 years, between 6 and 9 years and between 8 and 11 years respectively. The game makes use of 3D graphics.

Ages 4–7	Ages 6–9	Ages 8–11
		Get Lost; Write On; Space Shuffle; Head Hunt; Trog Eat Trog

== Commercial performance ==
Before 1989, the educational market was dwindling and the release of Fun School 2 was an outstanding success. The games sold over 60,000 copies by February and by this time a German Amiga package was developed. By April the games sold over 100,000 copies. During August in 1990, over 150,000 copies had been sold (including 30,000 Amstrad CPC copies). During the development of Fun School 3 by December, 250,000 copies of the games had been sold.

Before the BBC Micro and PC versions were released Fun School 3 had already sold 45,000 copies of other formats. By the time Fun School 4 was in development, Europress had sold 300,000 copies of its Fun School products and 400,000 copies by April.

By 1992, over 500,000 copies of the Fun School Range products were sold. By 1993, over 650,000 Fun School packages had been sold. When Fun School 5 was released, over 800,000 Fun School packages were sold and becoming an international bestseller. During the release of Fun School 6, around 1,500,000 copies of the Fun School Range were sold. When Fun School 7 was released, 2 million copies of the Fun School Range were sold.
