= Amstrad Action =

British magazine for Amstrad CPC users

- Amstrad Action issue #1, October 1985
- Launch Editor: Peter Connor
- Categories: Computer, Amstrad CPC, GX4000
- Frequency: Monthly
- Circulation: 38,457
- First issue: October 1985
- Final issue Number: June 1995; 117
- Company: Future plc
- Country: United Kingdom
- Language: English
- ISSN: 0954-8068

Amstrad Action is a discontinued monthly magazine, which was published in the United Kingdom. It is about home computers from the Amstrad CPC range and later the GX4000 console.

It is the first magazine published by Chris Anderson's Future Publishing, which with a varied line-up of computing and non-computing related releases has since become one of the foremost magazine publishers in the UK.

The publication, often abbreviated to AA by staff and readers, had the longest lifetime of any Amstrad magazine, running for 117 issues from October 1985 until June 1995 - long after the CPC had ceased production and games were no longer available.

== History ==
Published by Future plc, a company set up by Chris Anderson (ex-Personal Computer Games and Zzap!64 editor). Launch Editor, Peter Connor, also an ex-PCG staff member, shared the writing duties with the only other staff writer, Bob Wade. Bob, another ex-PCG/Zzap!64 staff member, was given the title ‘Software Editor’ and would review the vast majority of the games featured, with Peter given a second opinion. Trevor Gilham, Art Editor, would complete the four man team.

Issue 1 dated October 1985 was released in September 1985 with the cover price of £1; 1p for every one of the 100 pages. It took the new publication a few issues to find its readers, but with the help of a bumper 116 page Christmas 1985 issue with a cover mounted tape, the circulation figures grew rapidly. In October 1986 Amstrad Action split into three separate publications. AA still catered for the CPC range, while 8000 Plus and PC Plus focused on the Amstrad PCW and PC range respectively.

Amstrad Action #100, with re-designed logo

AA eventually gave in to reader's pleas to have a permanent cover tape. An announcement was made, in AA66, that the following issue would not only include a cover tape, but contain more colour and be printed on different paper. Review pages were also slightly re-designed.

In April 1992 the Audit Bureau of Circulation figures showed an increase to 37,120, the highest circulation since July–December 1988's 38,457.

AA100 looked at the top 100 products for the CPC and took a trip down memory lane, looking back at past editors and staff. As circulation figures wound down further still there was a drastic drop in page numbers from 60 to 36 in July 1994's AA106. More compact issues mean no superfluous columns or features. AA107 became the first issue with only one member of official staff.

In AA111 there was no credits list, but the new editor, Karen Levell, answered the Reaction letters and confirmed her appointment. Although everything appeared as normal in June 1995's AA117, with AA118 advertised in the next month box, this was the last AA ever. The final headline (on issue AA117) was Publish and be Damned.

== Features and editorial style ==
AA covered both 'games' and 'serious' side of the CPC, maintaining a 50/50 coverage throughout its run. The editorial coverage was always seen as being one of the three main areas; games/leisure, serious (programming, business software etc.), and the regulars, such as 'Amscene', 'Forum', 'Action Test', and 'Cheat Mode'.

Amscene

The latest CPC news regarding all things in the Amstrad world. Later included the games charts and games preview pages.

Reaction

The readers letters were answered in the Reaction section, where numerous arguments and, usually good natured, humour was found. Later during AAs run the standout letter of the month was highlighted and given the star prize award of £25. The technical problems page 'Problem Attic' started out in the Reaction pages in the early years before getting its own space. "If your CPC’s in danger, if you need help, then you can contact the AA team."

Action Test

The review approach included a main write up, a second opinion box, a good news / bad news comparison list and the percentages. Percentages were given to Graphics, Sonics, Grab Factor, Staying Power and an overall AA Rating. High rated games of 80% and above were given an 'AA Rave' accolade, while the highest rated game of the month received the 'Mastergame' award. This review style continued well into the early 1990s when the award accolades were scrapped. As budget games became more prominent during the CPC's life AA covered this growing market by including budget reviews in the 'Budget Bonanza' and later 'Action Replay' sections.

The Pilgrim

Interactive fiction was covered by "The Pilgrim", then "Balrog" and "The Examiner". The Pilgrim format included the latest adventure game reviews. 'Clue Sniffing With The Pilgrim' included adventure clues and tips. 'Pilgrim Post' was the letters column for adventure game topics. 'Adventure News' detailed the latest happenings in the world of adventure games.

Forum

The Forum carried on from the Problem Attic column where the resident Technical Editor answered reader's hardware or software problems and queries. As space in the magazine became restrictive other features like 'Helpline' and 'Ask Alex' were merged into the new 'Techy Forum'.

Type-In

One long running feature of AA was the Type-In section. This included utility, games and demo type-ins sent in by the readers. One had to type in the program code into the computer then run it. The core of this split the readership over whether the programs should be put on the covertape instead - over a six-month period this is what happened, until this practice (and ultimately the Type-Ins section) was abandoned due to space restrictions.

Helpline

The Helpline page was where eager Amstrad readers would offer contact details help fellow readers having problems. It was later merged with Technical Forum.

Cheat Mode

The tips pages included game pokes, tips, cheats and maps all contributed by the readers.

Aafterthought

Initially called Rear View, the back page was where all the loose ends were closed off, like competition winner results and last minute happenings.

Features

As activity in the Amstrad world declined, the editorial staff, and subsequently the editorial content, was constantly being reduced and the magazine adopted an increasingly eccentric style, with one edition in particular featuring an eight-page script for a Christmas pantomime. Later on, a double spread review for the 2nd Teenage Mutant Hero Turtles game was split between the review itself and a bizarre transcribed interview between Rod Lawton and Adam Peters (pretending to be one of the turtles). Peters would usually try and promote his band in some way (he featured on the cover of 'music orientated' issue and had one of his techno-MIDI band's songs on the covertape). The magazine is also notable for pioneering the kind of responses – sometimes dry, sometimes surreal, usually humorous and mildly rude – to readers' letters of a form now seen throughout UK gaming magazine culture. These characteristics, for many readers, added to AA's charm.

=== Cover Tapes ===
Chris Anderson using his previous success of covermounted cassette tapes with Personal Computer Games included one with the Christmas special issue of 1985. This included two unreleased games from Ocean Software; Kung Fu and Number 1. The covermount cassette tape was only an occurrence on the Christmas and AA birthday issues, not becoming a regular feature until AA67 in 1991, mainly due to requests from many readers. Cover-cassettes featured game demos, applications, software utilities and, in some instances, complete games. Due to the low quality of the cassettes used many Amstrad owners found them to be unreliable, something which was commonly reflected in the letters pages. One solution to fixing the unreliable tapes as posted to the letters section was to unwind the tape and put a warm iron on it. Later, a utility was released on the covertape to convert the contents to the proprietary 3" disk.

Dizzy, AA Special Edition

Codemasters produced a Dizzy game specially for the AA birthday covertape in October 1988. This 'Special Edition' included different rooms and objects to explore.

Action Pack #1

AA67, dated April 1990, came with the first of the permanent cover tapes called Action Pack #1, along with a new cover price of £2.20. A playable demo of Ocean Software's Total Recall and complete games Hydrofool and Codemasters' Dizzy were included on the tape.

Action Pack #2

This tape caused some controversy among the readers as one of the featured games How To Be A Complete Bastard featured mild swearing, plus the game's quest was to be violent and obnoxious throughout a house party.

Stormlord Censored

December 1993 AA99's Serious Action cover tape included the complete Stormlord game, albeit a censored version. With the self-censoring of the Hewson game it seemed that AA was trying to avoid similar controversy that followed AA68's Action Pack #2.

Best Game Ever On Covertape

Voted the best game on the CPC, Firebird's Elite was the complete game given away with the 100th issue's Serious Action cover tape.

=== AA Games Accolades ===
Initially only the best rated game of the month earned an AA Mastergame accolade, but from issue 57 this was changed to all games that received a 90% or higher rating. Games receiving 80–90% were awarded an AA Rave. Publishers of CPC games such as Activision, Ocean and Infogrames proudly mounted these awards on their packaging to promote their games to potential customers. The first game to receive a 'Mastergame' award was Melbourne House's The Way of the Exploding Fist, gaining an impressive 94% AA Rating. Issue 38 was the first issue not to award any game the Mastergame accolade. Apparently there were no games worthy of the award that month. The lowest rated Mastergame was Target Renegade, from Imagine Software, receiving an 86% overall rating. Quite why it was awarded a Mastergame was not explained and remains a mystery.

Laser Squad, by Blade Software, which was mentioned many times as being an AA staff favourite, was awarded the Mastergame accolade, in AA49, with a 91% rating. March 1990 and the mysterious lost Mastergame that would be Chase HQ. The Ocean arcade game conversion received a score of 90%, coupled with being the highest rated game this issue. This would normally justify the Mastergame accolade, however the game only got an AA Rave accolade and no explanation or corrections were made since. June 1990 was the first issue to award the Mastergame accolade to more than one game; E-Motion by US Gold and Turrican by Rainbow Arts received ratings of 92% and 90% respectively. November 1990 and Rick Dangerous 2 received the highest rating so far. The MicroStyle game gained a MasterGame award and an AA Rating of 97%.

Psygnosis' Lemmings and Ocean's The Addams Family were the last games to receive a Mastergame accolade in July 1992's AA82; receiving 97% and 90% respectively. Following issues dispensed with AA Rave and Mastergame accolades. Lemmings joins Rick Dangerous 2 as gaining the highest AA rating given during its publication. March 1993's issue 90 featured the first highest rated game not to receive an AA accolade. Nigel Mansell’s World Championship received an overall rating of 93%, but no accolade of either Rave or Mastergame. The long standing AA signature accolade had been discarded.

== Editorial staff ==
Memorable staff included Publisher Chris Anderson, Bob Wade, Richard Monteiro, Steve Carey, Rod "The Beard" Lawton, Trenton Webb, James Leach, Frank O'Connor and Adam Waring. Later editorial staff included Linda Barker, Dave Golder, Tim Norris and Simon Forrester, whose magazine nickname/handle was "The Hairy One", "The Hairy Happening" or often just "Hairy". Simon had written various programs himself for the platform and was known to jump down the throats of people who didn't agree with his fondness for the video game Chuckie Egg.

=== Editors ===
Bob Wade
Software Editor (AA1–AA12)
Deputy Editor (AA13–AA16)
Editor (AA17–AA34)

Like Chris, Bob started out at PCG and Zzap!64, before becoming the Software Editor on AA. Climbed the ranks of Deputy Editor before becoming the Editor. Bob left after issue 34 to Edit sister publication Advanced Computer Entertainment and later Amiga Format. While at Amiga Format he helped launch Amiga Power. Left journalism, in the mid-1990s, to form his own games development company; Binary Asylum, producing Amiga games like Zee Wolf and Zee Wolf 2. After Binary Asylum failed to establish itself into the PC market Bob moved over to the internet product monitoring service; Game Campaign. He is now back at Future.

Steve Carey
Editor (AA35–AA50)

Having spent some time at PC Plus as Production Editor, Steve replaced the departing Bob Wade as Editor on issue 35. Left after issue 50 in November 1989 to edit ST Format. Later went on to become a Publisher overseeing such titles as MEGA, Amiga Power, PC Gamer, .net and the games industries well respected EDGE, among others. In January 1995 he was made Publishing Director for the Consumer Division. He now lives in Australia.

Rod Lawton
Editor (AA51–AA89)

Previous experience of working on New Computer Express and ACE, Rod arrived at AA51 and holds the record for longest serving editor, spanning 39 issues and over three years. Left to work as Editor at Future's newly launched Leisure publishing section. Has written, or co-written, many computing and games books. Has written for many publications since, including PC Plus, PC Answers, PC Format. Most recently has written for the weekly "Computing for beginners" style magazine Computeractive. Also runs a Digital Imaging web site where photographers at all levels of expertise can find out more about the terms, concepts and techniques behind photography.

Dave Golder
Editor (AA96–AA109)

Previous work on Your Sinclair and Commodore Format before arriving as Editor on AA96. Left after issue 111 to edit fellow Future title Ultimate Future Games. In 1995 he helped launch the new Future Publishing Sci-Fi mag SFX, taking over the editor position in 1996 and remained there until 2005. Currently writes a Sci-Fi column on the Sci-Fi UK website.

=== Staff Writers ===
Richard Monteiro
Technical Editor (AA15–AA32)

Richard arrived as the new Technical Editor on issue 15. After 18 issues he left to launch new Future publication ST/Amiga Format. In 1990 Richard formed the company Words Works Limited, in Trowbridge with his own editorial team and produced RAZE under subcontract from Newsfield Publications. The first issue of RAZE appeared in October 1990 and ran for 12 issue until Newsfield couldn't sustain any more publications. In 1992 Richard, along with another ex-Future Publishing staff member Dianne Taverner, co-founded Paragon Publishing, holding the title managing director. Key titles published during the 1990s included Sega Pro, Play, XGen and Games World: The magazine.

Trenton Webb
Staff Writer (AA42–AA59)

Trenton arrived as the new games reviewing guru in June 1989's issue. After 18 issues had left to work on many other Future Publishing titles including Amiga Format and Your Sinclair. During this time he appeared on Channel 4's GamesMaster video games TV show in the reviews section. Later became Editor of magazines such as Game Zone, Commodore Format and ST Format. He left journalism in the mid-1990s to work in the industry itself, working with Bob Wade, at Binary Asylum, as a Games Designer. After Binary Asylum closed, he went to work for Internet and Intranet website design firm Zehuti as Project Manager.

James Leach
Staff Writer (AA60–AA64)

Experienced member of Future publishing who has worked on many magazines. Apart from Amstrad Action James had worked on Your Sinclair, Amiga Format, PC Format, GamesMaster and as Editor on SNES magazine Super Play. After leaving Future Publishing, in the mid-1990s, James went on to work for software company Bullfrog, contributing to many games including Syndicate Wars, Dungeon Keeper and Theme Hospital. Other companies James has worked for include Black & White Studios and Lionhead, holding positions such as Lead Writer and Head of Scripting & Writing respectively, working on such games as Black & White, Fable and Black & White 2. In 2006 James left Lionhead to go freelance where he now describes his skill and experience as "Writer of game plots, dialogue, websites, ads (ATL and BTL), children's books, sitcoms and more."

Frank O'Connor
Staff Writer (AA65–AA72)

Frank's first job in the industry was Amstrad Action's position of Staff Writer. Frank left AA after issue 71 to work on EMAP's Computer & Video Games (a.k.a. C+VG). After his stint on C+VG Frank came back to Future Publishing to edit the Nintendo games magazine Total!. Appeared, as co-commentator, on many GamesMaster episodes during the second and third series from 1992 to 1994. Later moved into the games industry; worked as Editor in Chief on DailyRadar.com an online video games site. Later held the position of Executive Editor on the Official Xbox Magazine. Is currently Content Manager for Bungie; the developer of Halo, Myth, Oni, and Marathon.

Adam Waring
Technical Editor (AA50–AA83)

Joint second longest serving editorial staff, along with Bob Wade, Adam was the Technical Editor for 34 issues. Reviewed Rick Dangerous 2, which is the joint highest rated AA game. Adam had written several games himself, including Lost Caves and Ninja Massacre, and if one came up for review upon re-release, he would gracefully be allowed to write a second opinion. He also wrote Your Sinclair's "Spec Tec" column where readers technical queries were answered. Left Future Publishing in 1992 to travel around the world. Returned to Future Publishing Editing magazines such as Max Magazine. Went on to edit Merricks Media's Spanish Magazine based in Bath.

Simon Forrester
Staff Writer (AA89–AA106)

One of the last Staff Writers to work on AA, arriving just as Rod Lawton was leaving in 1993. Later shared duties between AA and Commodore Format before taking over the editorship of CF in 1995. Later worked for Bath-based internet monitoring company called FYI, and their site gamecampaign.com, and then Bath-based web designers Zehuti Ltd.

== Freelance writers ==
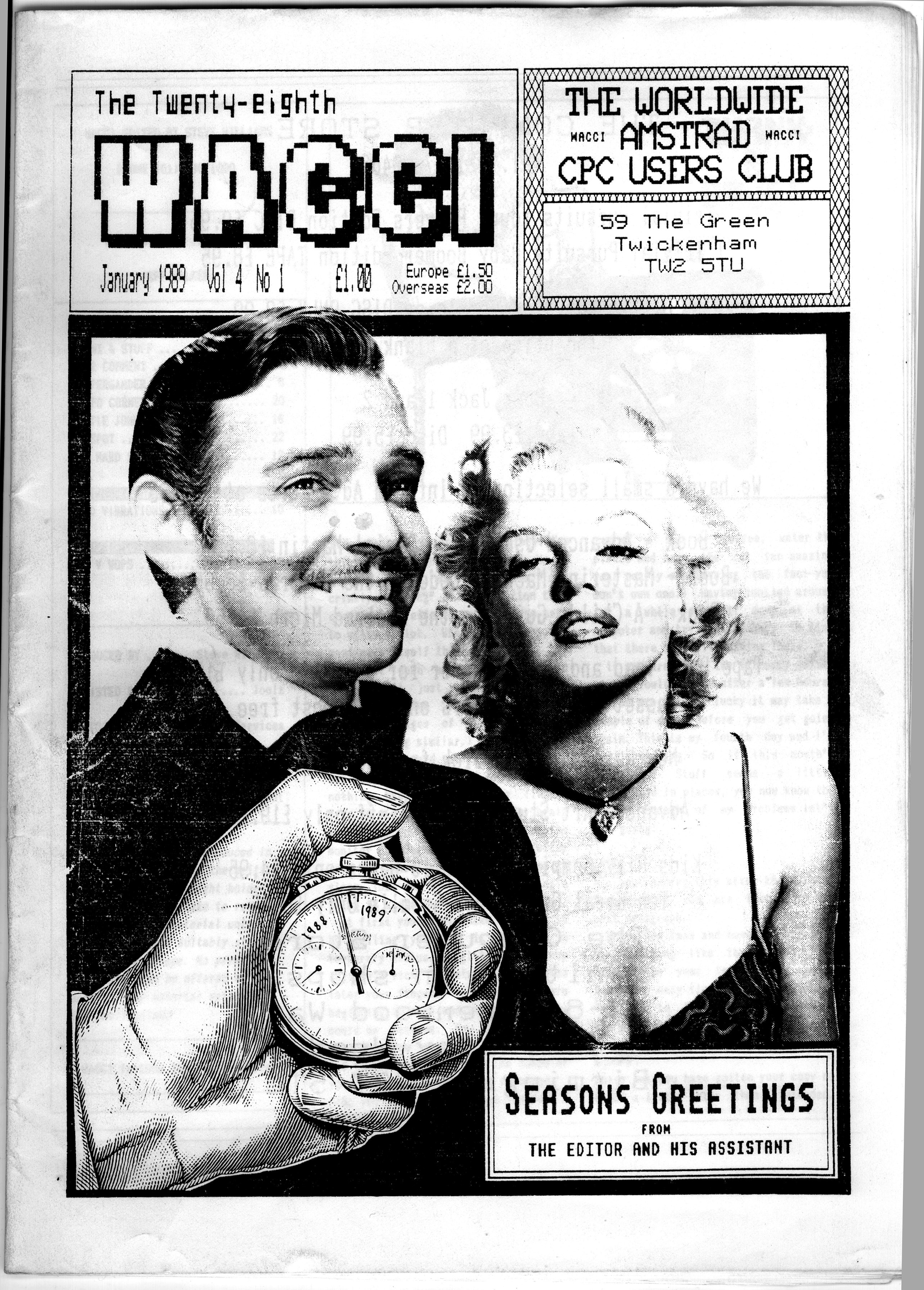
WACCI fanzine

There were many freelance writers, with many producing a regular, monthly column. They included Steve "The Pilgrim" Cooke; Stuart "The Balrog" Whyte; PD columnists Jerry Glenwright, Caroline Lamb (a.k.a. Steve Williams), Tim Blackbond and Keith Wood; fanzine columnist David Crookes; and reviewers Richard Wildey and Angela Cook. David Crookes continues to write about the Amstrad as a freelance writer for Retro Gamer magazine.

One of the most memorable, however, was technical writer and covertape editor Richard Fairhurst, a.k.a. CRTC. The latter name matched the initialism of the CPC's Cathode Ray Tube Controller and was sometimes expanded to ChaRleyTroniC. He ran a public domain library called Robot PD and was also an accomplished computer programmer, producing the fully-fledged utilities PowerPage and RoutePlanner for the CPC as well as contributing to various demos. In the CPC fan community, he wrote articles about demos for CPC Attack, was editor of the Amstrad-centred disczine Better Than Life, and was the final editor of the more professional-centric fanzine WACCI.
