= Redmi K70 =

Android smartphone developed by Xiaomi

Redmi K70 (POCO F6 Pro) Redmi K70 Pro Redmi K70E POCO X6 Pro
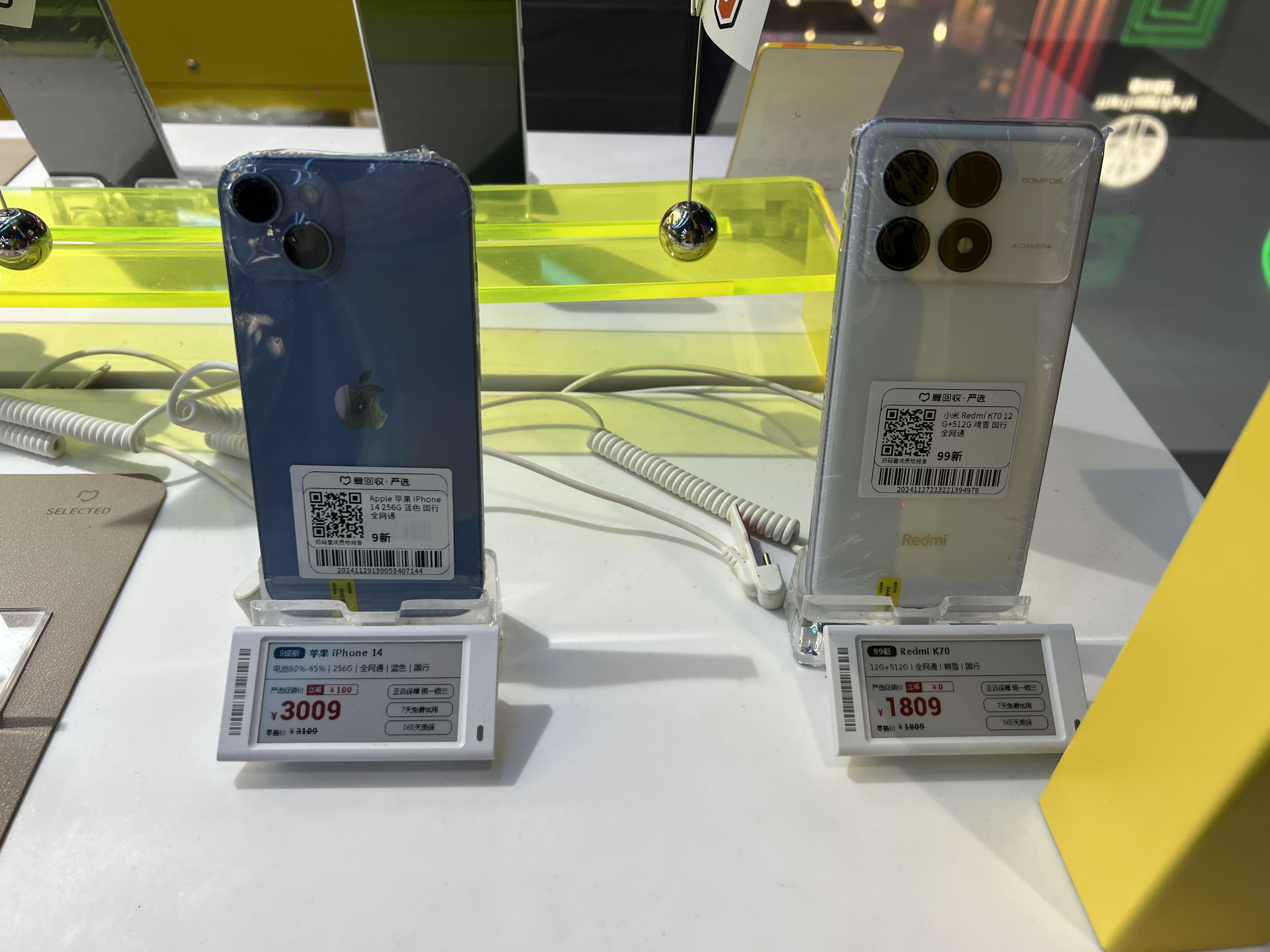
- iPhone 14 (left) and Redmi K70 (right)
- Brand: Redmi; POCO
- Manufacturer: Xiaomi
- Type: Phablet
- Series: Redmi K POCO F/X
- First released: K70 / Pro / 70E: November 29, 2023; 2 years ago POCO X6 Pro: January 11, 2024; 2 years ago POCO F6 Pro: May 23, 2024; 2 years ago
- Predecessor: Redmi K60 / POCO F5 Pro; POCO X5 Pro 5G
- Successor: Redmi K80
- Compatible networks: GSM, 3G, 4G, LTE, 5G
- Form factor: Slate
- Colors: K70: Bamboo Moonlight, Light Eggplant Purple, Clear Snow, Ink Feather; K70 Pro: Bamboo Moonlight, Clear Snow, Ink Feather, Green (Automobili Lamborghini SQUADRA CORSE), Yellow (Automobili Lamborghini SQUADRA CORSE); K70E: Shadow Green, Clear Snow, Ink Feather; POCO F6 Pro: White, Black; POCO X6 Pro: Spectre Black, POCO Yellow, Racing Grey
- Dimensions: K70 / Pro / POCO F6 Pro: 160.86 mm H 74.95 mm W 8.21 mm D; K70E: 160.45 mm H 74.34 mm W 8.05 mm D; POCO X6 Pro: 160.45 mm H 74.34 mm W 8.25 mm D (plastic) / 8.35 mm D (vegan leather)
- Weight: K70 / Pro / POCO F6 Pro: 209 g K70 Pro Automobili Lamborghini SQUADRA CORSE: 211 g K70E: 198 g POCO X6 Pro: 186 g (plastic) / 190 g (vegan leather)
- Operating system: Initial: Android 14 with Xiaomi HyperOS; Current: Android 16 with Xiaomi HyperOS 3
- System-on-chip: K70 / POCO F6 Pro: Qualcomm Snapdragon 8 Gen 2 (4 nm); K70 Pro: Qualcomm Snapdragon 8 Gen 3 (4 nm); K70E / POCO X6 Pro: MediaTek Dimensity 8300 Ultra (4 nm)
- CPU: K70 / POCO F6 Pro: Octa-core (1x3.2 GHz Cortex-X3 & 2x2.8 GHz Cortex-A715 & 2x2.8 GHz Cortex-A710 & 3x2.0 GHz Cortex-A510); K70 Pro: Octa-core (1x3.3 GHz Cortex-X4 & 3x3.2 GHz Cortex-A720 & 2x3.0 GHz Cortex-A720 & 2x2.3 GHz Cortex-A520); K70E / POCO X6 Pro: Octa-core (1x3.35 GHz Cortex-A715 & 3x3.2 GHz Cortex-A715 & 4x2.2 GHz Cortex-A510)
- GPU: K70 / POCO F6 Pro: Adreno 740; K70 Pro: Adreno 750; K70E / POCO X6 Pro: Mali-G615 MC6
- Memory: K70 / POCO F6 Pro: 12 GB / 16 GB; K70 Pro: 12 GB / 16 GB / 24 GB; K70E: 8 GB / 12 GB / 16 GB; POCO X6 Pro: 8 GB / 12 GB; LPDDR5X
- Storage: K70 / Pro / 70E / POCO F6 Pro: 256 GB / 512 GB / 1 TB; POCO X6 Pro: 256 GB / 512 GB; UFS 4.0
- Removable storage: No
- SIM: Dual SIM (Nano-SIM)
- Battery: All models: Non-removable, Li-Po; K70 / Pro / POCO F6 Pro / X6 Pro: 5000 mAh; K70E: 5500 mAh
- Charging: K70 / Pro / POCO F6 Pro: 120 W fast charging, Power Delivery 3.0, Quick Charge 3+ K70E: 90 W fast charging, Power Delivery 3.0, Quick Charge 2.0; POCO X6 Pro: 67 W fast charging, Power Delivery 3.0, Quick Charge 2.0
- Rear camera: K70 / POCO F6 Pro: 50 MP, f/1.6 (wide), 1/1.55", 1.0 µm, PDAF, OIS + 8 MP, f/2.2 (ultrawide) + 2 MP, f/2.4 (macro); Video: 8K@24fps, 4K@24/30/60fps, 1080p@30/60/120/240/960fps, 720p@960/1920fps, gyro-EIS; K70 Pro: 50 MP, f/1.6 (wide), 1/1.55", 1.0 µm, PDAF, OIS + 50 MP (telephoto), PDAF, 2x optical zoom + 12 MP (ultrawide); Video: 8K@24fps, 4K@24/30/60fps, 1080p@30/60/120/240/960fps, 720p@960/1920fps, gyro-EIS; K70E / POCO X6 Pro: 64 MP, f/1.7 (wide), 1/2", 0.7 µm, PDAF, OIS + 8 MP, f/2.2, 120° (ultrawide) + 2 MP, f/2.4 (macro); Video: 4K@24/30fps, 1080p@30/60/120/240/960fps, 720p@960/1920fps, gyro-EIS; All models: LED flash, HDR, panorama
- Front camera: 16 MP, f/2.4 (wide), 1/3.06", 1.0 µm HDR; Video: 1080p@30/60fps
- Display: All models: OLED, 120 Hz, Dolby Vision, HDR10+, 6.67", 20:9; K70 / Pro / POCO F6 Pro: 3200 × 1440 (WQHD), 526 ppi K70E / POCO X6 Pro: 2712 × 1220 (1.5K), 446 ppi
- Water resistance: K70E / POCO X6 Pro: IP54
- Model: K70: 23113RKC6C; K70 Pro: 23117RK66C; K70E: 2311DRK48C; POCO F6 Pro: 23113RKC6G; POCO X6 Pro: 2311DRK48G, 2311DRK48I
- Made in: K70 / Pro / 70E: China; POCO X6 Pro: China, India
- Website: www.mi.com/redmi-k70 www.mi.com/redmi-k70-pro www.mi.com/redmi-k70e www.mi.com/ua/product/poco-f6-pro/ www.mi.com/ua/product/poco-x6-pro/

The Redmi K70 is a line of smartphones from Xiaomi's sub-brand Redmi, forming part of the Redmi K series. The Redmi K70, K70 Pro, and K70E were announced on November 29, 2023.

On January 11, 2024, alongside the POCO X6, POCO introduced the POCO X6 Pro, which serves as the global version of the Redmi K70E with a slightly smaller battery capacity, less powerful charging, and different color variants. Additionally, on May 23, 2024, POCO announced the POCO F6 Pro alongside the POCO F6, serving as the international market version of the Redmi K70.

== Design ==
The front panel of all models is made of Corning Gorilla Glass 5. The frame on the Redmi K70, K70 Pro, and POCO F6 Pro is made of aluminum, with a glass back panel, whereas the Redmi K70E and POCO X6 Pro (in black and grey) feature a plastic frame and back. The POCO X6 Pro in yellow features a vegan leather back panel.

The rear panel design is similar to the Xiaomi MIX Fold 3. Additionally, the Redmi K70E and POCO X6 Pro feature dust and splash protection rated at IP54.

At the bottom are the USB-C port, speaker, microphone, and a dual SIM card slot. At the top are a secondary microphone, infrared port, and a second speaker on the Redmi K70E and POCO X6 Pro. The volume buttons and power button are located on the right side.

The Redmi K70 and K70 Pro share 3 colors: Bamboo Moonlight (Green), Clear Snow (White), and Ink Feather (Black). The Redmi K70 is also available in Light Eggplant Purple.

The Redmi K70E is sold in 3 colors: Shadow Green, Clear Snow, and Ink Feather.

The POCO F6 Pro is sold in Black and White.

The POCO X6 Pro is sold in 3 colors: Spectre Black, POCO Yellow, and Racing Grey.

== Specifications ==
=== Hardware ===
The Redmi K70 and POCO F6 Pro are powered by the Qualcomm Snapdragon 8 Gen 2 processor paired with an Adreno 740 GPU; the K70 Pro uses the Snapdragon 8 Gen 3 paired with an Adreno 750 GPU; and the K70E and POCO X6 Pro use the MediaTek Dimensity 8300 Ultra paired with a Mali-G615 MC6 GPU.

=== Battery ===
The Redmi K70, K70 Pro, POCO F6 Pro, and POCO X6 Pro feature a 5000 mAh battery capacity, while the K70E features a 5500 mAh battery. All models utilize a non-removable Li-Po battery.

The Redmi K70, K70 Pro, and POCO F6 Pro support 120 W fast wired charging, the K70E supports 90 W, and the POCO X6 Pro supports 67 W.

=== Camera ===
All models feature a triple rear camera setup. On the Redmi K70 and POCO F6 Pro, it consists of a 50 MP wide primary camera with an f/1.6 aperture and a 2 MP macro module with an f/2.4 aperture. The Redmi K70E and POCO X6 Pro share a similar camera setup except for a 64 MP main module with an f/1.7 aperture. Meanwhile, the Redmi K70 Pro features the same primary camera as the Redmi K70, but includes a 12 MP ultrawide lens and a 50 MP telephoto lens with 2x optical zoom. It is the first Redmi K series smartphone since the Redmi K30 Pro Zoom to include a telephoto lens.

The main camera on the Redmi K70, K70 Pro, and POCO F6 Pro can record video at up to 8K@24fps, while the K70E and POCO X6 Pro support up to 4K@30fps.

All smartphones feature a 16 MP wide front-facing camera with an f/2.4 aperture, capable of recording video up to 1080p@60fps.

=== Display ===
The display is a 6.67" OLED panel with a 20:9 aspect ratio, 120 Hz refresh rate, support for Dolby Vision and HDR10+, a centered hole-punch cutout for the front camera, and an under-display optical fingerprint scanner.

The Redmi K70, K70 Pro, and POCO F6 Pro feature a WQHD (3200 × 1440) resolution with a pixel density of 526 ppi, whereas the K70E and POCO X6 Pro feature a 1.5K (2712 × 1220) resolution with a pixel density of 446 ppi.

=== Audio ===
The smartphones feature stereo speakers. On the Redmi K70, K70 Pro, and POCO F6 Pro, the earpiece acts as the secondary speaker, while on the Redmi K70E and POCO X6 Pro, the second speaker is dedicated and located on the top edge.

=== Storage and memory ===
The Redmi K70 is sold in 12 GB/256 GB, 16 GB/256 GB, 12 GB/512 GB, 16 GB/512 GB, and 16 GB/1 TB configurations; the K70 Pro in 12 GB/256 GB, 16 GB/256 GB, 12 GB/512 GB, 16 GB/512 GB, and 24 GB/1 TB configurations; the K70E in 8 GB/256 GB, 12 GB/256 GB, 12 GB/512 GB, and 16 GB/1 TB configurations; the POCO F6 Pro in 12 GB/256 GB, 12 GB/512 GB, and 16 GB/1 TB configurations; and the POCO X6 Pro in 8 GB/256 GB, 12 GB/256 GB, and 12 GB/512 GB configurations.

=== Software ===
The smartphones were released with Xiaomi HyperOS based on Android 14 and were updated to Xiaomi HyperOS 3 based on Android 16. The POCO X6 Pro was the first smartphone shipped with the global version of HyperOS pre-installed. The Redmi K70E and POCO X6 Pro are guaranteed to receive 3 major Android OS updates and 4 years of security patches.

== Special editions ==
=== Redmi K70 Pro Automobili Lamborghini SQUADRA CORSE ===
The Redmi K70 Pro Automobili Lamborghini SQUADRA CORSE is a special edition of the Redmi K70 Pro created in collaboration with Automobili Lamborghini. Inspired by the Lamborghini Essenza SCV12, it differs from the standard Redmi K70 Pro in camera island shape, a two-tone color scheme featuring a carbon fiber texture on top with green or yellow on the lower half, custom lettering on the camera housing, and the Automobili Lamborghini logo. The packaging includes a custom box, SIM ejector tool, charger, protective case, and a lanyard strap attached to the inside of the case. The device also features a custom system theme. It was sold exclusively in a 24 GB/1 TB configuration priced at ¥4,599.

== Reception ==
=== POCO X6 Pro ===
Criticized from Tech Advisor reviewer Jon Mundy, a primary criticism of Xiaomi smartphones was the design and user interface of their proprietary software, MIUI. In late 2023, Xiaomi officially phased out MIUI, replacing it across its device lineup with HyperOS, a newly developed operating system designed to improve software performance and ecosystem integration.

While the auxiliary hardware specifications are modest, overall imaging performance remains uncertain on the primary sensor's capability to deliver acceptable quality via 2x in-sensor cropping.

Preceded by Redmi K60 / Pro	Redmi K70 / Pro; 2023	Succeeded by Redmi K80 / Pro
Preceded by Redmi K60E	Redmi K70E; 2023	Incumbent
Preceded by POCO F5 Pro	POCO F6 Pro; 2024	Succeeded by POCO F7 Pro
Preceded by POCO X5 Pro	POCO X6 Pro; 2024	Succeeded by POCO X7 Pro
