= Alien 3 (video game) =

1992 video game

- North American Genesis box art
- Developers: Probe Software; Bits Studios (Game Boy)
- Publishers: Acclaim Entertainment (Commodore 64 version); Arena Entertainment (Game Gear and Genesis versions); LJN (all other versions)
- Producer: Joe Bonar
- Programmers: Michael Archer (Commodore 64); Squidgy (NES)
- Composers: Matt Furniss (Genesis, Game Gear, Master System); Andrew Rodger (C64); Jeroen Tel (NES); Steve Collett (SNES)
- Series: Alien
- Platforms: Amiga, Commodore 64, Game Boy, Game Gear, Master System, NES, Genesis, Super NES
- Release: October 1992: Genesis; NA/EU: October 1992 Master System; EU: October 21, 1992 Amiga; EU: November 1992 Game Boy; NA: January 1993 NES; NA: March 1993 SNES; NA: June 1993; UK: July 1993; BR: December 1993 Commodore 64; EU: November 1993 Game Gear; NA: 1993
- Genre: Run and gun
- Modes: Single player Multiplayer (Master System)

Alien 3 (stylized as ALIEN^{3}) is a 1992 run and gun video game based on the film of the same name. It was released for the Sega Genesis and Amiga in 1992, then for the Commodore 64, Game Boy, Game Gear, Nintendo Entertainment System, Super Nintendo Entertainment System, and Master System.

Each version was developed by Probe Software, except for the Game Boy version, which was developed by Bits Studios. The versions on all platforms differ in gameplay and graphics, the level layouts are most similar in the Amiga, Genesis and Master System versions.

== Gameplay ==
Alien 3 is a side-scrolling run and gun game in which the player controls Ellen Ripley, the film's main character, who progresses through the Fiorina 161 prison colony that was featured in the film. The player can jump, shoot, climb ladders, crawl through tunnels, open doors and use elevators. Unlike the film, Ripley has a large arsenal of weapons that can be used against the game's enemies, consisting of Aliens and Facehuggers. Weapons include pulse rifles, flamethrowers and grenades. A motion tracker warns the player of nearby enemies.

Level objectives are chosen from computer terminals, which are located throughout the game and also offer blueprints of the prison layout. Objectives include sealing off doors to prevent Aliens from entering, and rescuing prisoners. A time limit is present on each level, and the player loses a life if the level is not completed before the time expires. The game concludes with a battle between Ripley and the Alien Queen.

The SNES version includes six stages, and a password feature, which is absent from the Game Boy version. The Sega Genesis version includes 15 stages. The Genesis and SNES versions differ in design and graphics, and the Genesis version includes larger Alien character models. The Amiga version, which has 14 levels, features gameplay that moves slightly slower than the Genesis version, but is otherwise nearly identical. The Commodore 64 version has 15 levels, and is a nearly identical port of the Amiga version, but with slightly different level layouts. The Game Gear version is identical to the other versions of the game. The Master System version uses the same level layouts as the Genesis version, but includes a two-player option. The Game Boy version, unlike other versions of the game, is played from an overhead perspective.

== Release ==
The Genesis version was originally scheduled for a U.S. release in summer 1992, but was ultimately released in October 1992 for both North America and Europe. Also in Europe, the Master System version was released on October 21, 1992 followed up by the Amiga version a month later. In the United States, the Game Boy version was released in January 1993, while the NES version was released in March 1993, and the SNES version was released in June 1993. The SNES version was subsequently released in the United Kingdom in July 1993. The Commodore 64 version was released in Europe in November 1993.

== Reception ==
Reception

Review scores
Publication	Score						
Publication	Game Boy	Game Gear	Master System	NES	PC	Sega Genesis	SNES
AllGame		3/5		3.5/5		3.5/5	4.5/5
Electronic Gaming Monthly		7/10, 7/10, 8/10, 7/10					
Mean Machines Sega		90%					
Nintendo Power							3.85/5 (Note: Nintendo Power rated the SNES version 4.1/5 for graphics/sound, 3.5/5 for challenge, 3.8/5 for play control, and 4/5 for theme/fun.)
Official Nintendo Magazine	90/100						94/100
Super Play							84%
Commodore Force					93%		
Commodore Format					78%		
CU Amiga					92%		
Sega Force		84%	77%			92%	

Awards
Publication	Award
GameFan (Golden Megawards)	Best Movie Game (Genesis version, 1993) (Note: Chosen by three of GameFan's four editors.)
GameFan (Golden Megawards)	Best Action/Adventure game (SNES version, 1994)

GamePro praised the SNES version for its music, sound effects and graphics, and concluded that the game was "highly original–enough to please even jaded veterans of the Alien 3 wars on other systems." Jonathan Davies of Super Play praised the graphics of the SNES version and called it "damn good fun", while noting that it "makes effective use of the license without trying to be too true to it". Scott Alan Marriott of AllGame praised the sound and smooth animation of the SNES version and wrote, "Despite everything being gray and metallic-looking, the graphics are extremely impressive."

Nintendo Power praised the SNES version's action, sound, graphics and its diverse variety of missions, but criticized blueprints for only being accessible from computer terminals. Nintendo Magazine System praised the large number of levels in the SNES version, as well as the music and sound effects, but noted that the control system "takes a bit of getting used to". Nintendo Magazine System praised the music of the Game Boy version, but criticized the lack of abundant sound effects, as well as the absence of a password system. The magazine concluded that it was a "spiffing game, imaginatively designed and well-programmed". Nintendo Power praised the "very effective" cinema scenes in the Game Boy version, but criticized the controls for being slow to respond. Skyler Miller of AllGame noted that the NES version "isn't a mindless shooting fest," and wrote that the "atmosphere is appropriately creepy, with a gloomy color palette, foreboding soundtrack, and some semi-gory scenes".

GamePro reviewed the Genesis version, praising the music and writing that it "balances straight-up arcade-style action with enough tension to effectively capture the nail-biting mood of the movie". Shawn Sackenheim of AllGame reviewed the Genesis version, and wrote: "Graphically, Alien 3 has a lot going for it. The levels are vast and well detailed, the animation is smooth and believable, the game play is solid, and the challenge is just right. Control is excellent, though a bit troublesome when you are trying to land from jumps. [...] The sound and music are a bit shoddy, however. The music is a rather shallow PCM score that doesn't really add to the game. The effects are also a bit weak, sounding rather mono and unrealistic." Sega Force praised the Genesis version for its controls, its graphics, its large number of levels and noted that the "Suspenseful music gives the game a suitably scary feel." The magazine declared: "This is the game film fans have been waiting for!"

Sega Force praised the graphics of the Master System version for looking similar to the Genesis version, and also praised its music, sound effects, and controls, but noted that the gameplay sometimes becomes repetitive. Sega Force also praised the music, sound effects and graphics of the Game Gear version, but noted the repetitive gameplay. GamePro wrote that players should not expect the Game Gear version to "pack the same pulse-pounding action as the Genesis version. The Game Gear obviously doesn't pack enough power to match up with the 16-bit special effects. However, challenging gameplay and lengthy stages give the game more punch than average Game Gear fare." Mean Machines Sega reviewed the Game Gear version and praised its character animations and music, but criticized its sound effects and similar-looking backgrounds. The magazine also noted that it "doesn't move as well" as the Genesis version. Kyle Knight of AllGame reviewed the Game Gear version and criticized its music and "some quirky and occasionally frustrating AI actions". However, Knight wrote that the game "successfully combines exploration and action", and that the "background details and alien sprites are nicely done, but unfortunately the main character isn't."

CU Amiga praised the Amiga version's graphics, sound effects and music, and called it an "excellent Aliens game." The magazine's reviewer concluded: "This is one of the best movie-to-game conversions I've seen." James Price of Commodore Force praised the Commodore 64 version for its graphics, music, sound effects and abundance of levels, and wrote that "despite its obvious technical excellence, it's glitchy in places. But with its large amount of options, surprisingly unobtrusive multi-load and large, well-designed levels, Alien 3's a winner." Commodore Format reviewed the Commodore 64 version and criticized the "fairly standard" gameplay, the similar levels, and the easiness, but praised the "well-paced" action and noted that the time limits add to the game's tension.

Entertainment Weekly gave the game an A− and wrote that "Where the movie had no armament and only one full-grown monster, this game has an armed-to-her-teeth Ripley racing against time to smoke hordes of fanged critters."

=== Accolades ===
The Genesis version was chosen by three of GameFan's four editors as the Best Movie Game, a category for the publication's 1992 Golden Megawards. For the 1993 Golden Megawards, the SNES version won in the category of Best Action/Adventure game, and was the runner-up for Best Movie Game, losing to the Genesis version of Disney's Aladdin. In 1995, Total! ranked the game 30th on their Top 100 SNES Games, writing: "The graphics are mean 'n' moody just like the film and the platform shoot-'em-up action just seems to draw you fight in. It's a superb blast." IGN rated the SNES version 56th on its Top 100 SNES Games.
