= Rick Dangerous =

1989 video game

- Developer: Core Design
- Publisher: Firebird Software
- Designer: Simon Phipps
- Platforms: Amiga, Amstrad CPC, Atari ST, Acorn Archimedes, Commodore 64, ZX Spectrum, SAM Coupé, MS-DOS
- Release: 1989
- Genre: Platform
- Mode: Single-player

Rick Dangerous is a platform game developed by Core Design for the Acorn Archimedes, Amiga, Atari ST, Amstrad CPC, ZX Spectrum, Commodore 64, and MS-DOS. The game was released in 1989 and published by MicroProse on the Firebird Software label in the UK, and on the MicroPlay label in America. It was also published in Spain by Erbe Software. Later, it was released with two other games, Stunt Car Racer and MicroProse Soccer, on the Commodore 64 Powerplay 64 cartridge. The game was followed by a sequel, Rick Dangerous 2, in 1990. Loosely based on the Indiana Jones film franchise, the game received mixed reviews from critics.

== Plot ==
The plot of Rick Dangerous is largely based on the Indiana Jones film Raiders of the Lost Ark. Set in 1945, British agent Rick Dangerous travels to the Amazon jungle to search for the lost Goolu tribe. His plane crashes in the jungle, and Rick must escape from the enraged Goolu. When the game starts Rick finds himself in a cave running from a rolling boulder, a famous scene from the Indiana Jones film.

Armed with a pistol and dynamite, Rick must fight hostiles and evade traps in three more levels. The second level of the game is set inside a pyramid located in Egypt. In the third level, Rick must venture to the Nazi stronghold of Schwarzendumpf castle to rescue captured Allied soldiers. The rescued soldiers tell him that the Nazis are planning a missile attack on London. Therefore, in the last level, Rick must infiltrate their secret missile base.

== Gameplay ==
Rick can jump and climb, as well as carry a limited amount of dynamite and ammunition for his gun. This gun is Rick's primary means of disposing of enemies. Most traps throughout the game that can kill Rick can also kill his enemies, which can be to the player's advantage. The dynamite sticks that Rick carries are generally used for solving puzzles, such as through exploding certain blocks (some of them fly towards the explosion, potentially killing Rick in the backfire). Rick is also armed with a pogo stick that allows him to paralyze enemies.

Many of the traps in Rick Dangerous have no visible warning, which means that a player's initial progress through the game may consist of trial and error. This was criticized by some reviewers.

== Reception ==
Reception

Review scores
Publication	Score
The One for Amiga Games	5/5 (Amiga, re-release)
Amiga Format	89% (Amiga)
ACE	890/1000 (Amiga); 5/5 (Amiga re-release)
The One for 16-bit Games	88% (Amiga); 88% (ST)
Computer and Video Games	87% (Spectrum); 87% (Amiga); 87% (C64); 87% (ST)
Sinclair User	85% (Spectrum); 84 (Spectrum, re-release); 79% (Spectrum)
CU Amiga-64	84% (C64)
Amstrad Action	83% (Amstrad)
Crash	81% (Spectrum); 76% (Spectrum)
Your Sinclair	78% (Spectrum); 70% (Spectrum re-release)
The Games Machine	76% (Amstrad); 81% (C64); 78% (Spectrum)
Zzap!64	73% (C64)
Amiga Power	2/5 (Amiga); 17% (Amiga, re-release)

Your Sinclair awarded Rick Dangerous a 78% rating, while Computer and Video Games gave the Spectrum game an 87%, plus a "C+VG Hit" award, saying that it was "an excellent platform game ..."

The C64 version received an 84% from CU Amiga-64 and a 73% from Zzap!64. Zzap!64 pointed out that the game was a playable and fun platform-style game but not much more than that. The Amstrad version also received the same response getting a 76% from The Games Machine, although the game fared slightly better with Amstrad Action who rated it 83% and awarded it with an "AA Rave" accolade.

ACE gave the Amiga version an 890 rating, and Amiga Format gave an 89%. Amiga Power was highly critical of both games and the reliance on pattern learning.

The Atari ST version received positive reviews; 88% and 87% from The One for 16-bit Games and Computer and Video Games, respectively. The One magazine opined that Rick Dangerous was one of the best 16-bit arcade games at that time.

Game developer David Cage considers Rick Dangerous to be his favourite game.
