= List of computer magazines in Spain =

This is a list of computer magazines published in Spain.

== List of computer magazines ==
- Arroba
- CiberSur
- Computer Hoy
- Gaceta Tecnológica
- Hobby consolas
- Linux Magazine
- Micromanía
- Novática
- PC Actual
- PC Forma
- PC Pro
- PC World
- Linux+
- Linux Actual
- Linux User
- Superjuegos
- Todo Linux

== Defunct ==
- 8000 Plus
- Amiga World
- Amigos del Amstrad
- Amstrad Acción
- Amstrad Educativo
- Amstrad Mania
- Amstrad Personal
- Amstrad Sinclair Ocio
- Amstrad User
- Computer Music
- CPC Attack
- CPC User
- FamilyPC
- Megaocio
- MicroHobby
- Microhobby Amstrad Especial
- Microhobby Amstrad Semanal
- Mundo Amstrad
- PC Magazine
- PC Manía
- PC Soft
- PC User
- PC Útil
- PC World
- PCW Plus
- Programación Actual
- Programando mi Amstrad
- Solo Programadores
- Super máquinas
- Todo sobre el Amstrad
- Tu Micro Amstrad
- Users
- Xtreme PC

== See also ==
- List of magazines in Spain
