= Apex Computer Productions =

Video game developer

- Industry: Video games
- Headquarters: United Kingdom
- Key people: John Rowlands; Steve Rowlands

Apex Computer Productions was the brothers John Rowlands and Steve Rowlands, British based game designers and programmers on the Commodore 64 in the late 1980s and early 1990s.

They programmed in pure assembly language and their earliest commercial release was Cyberdyne Warrior, a platform shooter, for Hewson in 1989. Soon after, they entered a relationship with Thalamus, the game publishing arm of Newsfield, who published their next game, Retrograde.

== Thalamus relationship ==
After Creatures, Apex began work on the sequel Creatures II: Torture Trouble, still developing on the Commodore 64. In a startling coup—since Thalamus were associated with a rival magazine publisher in Newsfield, the home of ZZAP!64 — Commodore Format (Future Publishing) secured the rights to serialise the development of the game, which again proved very popular. Creatures II was received favorably by the critics. Creatures II focused more on the popular torture screens than on the side-scrolling platforming of Creatures.

Thalamus collapsed shortly after the publication of Creatures II, as the Commodore 64 had started to wane in popularity. Apex then decided to publish for themselves.

== Solo ==
Mayhem in Monsterland was their swan song. Platformers had become very popular, with Sonic The Hedgehog and Super Mario Bros. on the consoles. Mayhem was a game fashioned after Sonic, though mostly a direct descendant of Creatures.

Mayhem in Monsterland was given a "perfect" 100% score when reviewed by Commodore Format magazine. This proved controversial both because the game contained bugs (not all stars could be collected on all levels), and because the Rowlands brothers had close ties with the magazine, documenting the development of the game in game diary features.

== Games ==
- Cyberdyne Warrior (Hewson, 1989)
- Retrograde (Thalamus Ltd, 1989)
- Creatures (Thalamus Ltd, 1990)
- Creatures II: Torture Trouble (Thalamus Ltd, 1992)
- Mayhem in Monsterland (Apex, 1993)
