= Commodore Force =

UK computer games magazine

- November 1993 cover
- Editor: Steve Shields; James Price
- Categories: Computer and video games
- Frequency: Monthly
- First issue: January 1993
- Final issue Number: March 1994; 16
- Company: Europress Impact
- Country: United Kingdom
- Based in: Ludlow, Shropshire
- Language: English
- Website: www.zzap64.co.uk
- ISSN: 0967-7461

Commodore Force was a computer games magazine covering games for the Commodore 64. It was published in the UK by Europress Impact. Its predecessor was Zzap!64.

== Background ==
Commodore Force was created when Zzap! 64 was re-launched with a new name and design. The name change was not only in line with the then current Europress Impact titles, Sega Force, N-Force, Amiga Force, but served to distance the magazine from the old Zzap! 64 style.

The editorial team included Steve Shields (managing editor), Phil King (deputy editor), Chris Hayward, Ian Osborne and James Price, all staff writers. Issue 1 had the cover date of January 1993. Regular editorial content included What's Happening (news), Reel Action (2x cover tapes), Lloyd Mangram's Mail Bag (letters), The Tipster, Public Sector (PD column), Bash Yer Brains (Adventure section) and The Mighty Brian (a technical section). First Samurai received the first new Commodore Force "Hurricane Hit" accolade with a 97% overall rating.

By issue 2 Phil King had gone, his vacant Deputy Editor position filled by Ian Osborne. Miles Guttery joined as staff writer to replace James Price who had also left.

In issue 4, publishers Europress Impact changed their name to Impact Magazines. Controversy ensued as Emlyn Hughes International Soccer was released on budget and harshly reviewed by Chris Hayward and Miles Guttery, who gave ratings of 46% and 70%. Countless Emlyn Hughes International Soccer fans bombarded the magazine with complaints. The magazine later retracted the rating in a games round up in issue 10 and awarded it a middle-of-the-road 75%.

With issue 10 Zzap! 64, or Commodore Force (incorporating Zzap! 64), reached 100 issues. A pull-out Zzap!64 100th issue special featured all the gold medal games in the magazine's history. Steve Shields had left, to go to Sega Force Mega / Sega Master Force, leaving the Editor's position to James Price, who had previously returned in issue 6. Ian Osborne had also left, going over to Amiga Force.

In Issue 11 and Commodore Force listed its Top 100 Commodore 64 games of all time. Top three games listed included Head over Heels, runner up Laser Squad and top spot goes to Frankie Goes To Hollywood. Chris Hayward also departed during this time.

A triple whammy of Hurricanes were reviewed in issue 12. The long-awaited Mayhem In Monsterland and Lemmings both received an overall rating of 97%, while Alien 3 was awarded 93%.

The readers got their chance to have a top 100 Commodore 64 game of all-time list. Creatures came out on top, followed by The Blues Brothers, Creatures 2, Turrican 2 and Bubble Bobble.

A readers awards of 1993 is listed in issue 15. Main awards included Beat ‘em up for Barbarian 2, best sport game was Emlyn Hughes International Soccer. The Blues Brothers won best movie tie-in, while the main best game overall went to Mayhem In Monsterland.

Issue 16’s next-month page announced that the next issue would feature the CF team's favourite game. "Issue 17 – on sale, March 10", though it never did go on sale due to Impact Magazines closing down. Issue 16 also contained no new game reviews, with much space taken up by reprinting old cheats and tips.

== See also ==
- Video game journalism
- Video game industry
- Video game
