= Rick Dangerous 2 =

1990 video game

- Developer: Core Design
- Publisher: Micro Style
- Designers: Simon Phipps; Terry Lloyd; Robert Churchill
- Programmer: Simon Phipps
- Artists: Simon Phipps; Terry Lloyd
- Composer: David K. Pridmore
- Platforms: Amiga, Atari ST, Commodore 64, Amstrad CPC, ZX Spectrum, MS-DOS
- Release: 1990
- Genre: Platform
- Mode: Single-player

Rick Dangerous 2 is a platform game developed by Core Design for the Amiga, Atari ST, Amstrad CPC, ZX Spectrum, Commodore 64, and MS-DOS. It was released in 1990 and published by Micro Style as a sequel to Rick Dangerous.

== Plot ==
At the end of Rick Dangerous, an alien invasion comes to Earth. As Rick Dangerous 2 starts, UFOs land in London. The image shift in the character of Rick Dangerous is evident from the start: the coat is nowhere to be found and the Indiana Jones-style hat from the previous episode is almost symbolically blown off by a laser beam coming from one of the spaceships in the introduction sequence. One UFO lands in Hyde Park, and Rick goes there to settle the score with the aliens.

== Gameplay ==
There are a number of changes to the game play that make the Rick Dangerous 2 more complex and more challenging than its predecessor. For a start, Rick is now armed with a laser gun and bombs that can not only be placed but slid, making way for strategic bomb-placement. The pogo stick is replaced by a punch attack. Rick can also employ a special flying vehicle in certain areas of the game that allows for faster movement, but this may also become a danger factor.

Also, while there is a linear story to the game, the first four levels may be played in any order. Completing these four levels (Hyde Park, the ice caverns on the planet Freezia, the deep forest of Vegetablia and the "atomic mud mines") unlocks the fifth and final level, the Fat Guy's Headquarters, which ends in a boss fight. This level can then be played as often as desired, until the player quits the game, but the endgame movie only plays if the player completes all five levels in order.

== Unclosed ending ==
The end of Rick Dangerous 2 does not complete the story. The game finishes with a cliffhanger, with the Fat Guy escaping at the final moment via a teleporter device, and Rick following him with familiar caption "What will Rick do next?". Though this may have hinted another sequel to the story, Rick Dangerous 3 was never made. Although a "Rick Dangerous II½" was given away by The One Amiga on a cover disk, this was only a few additional levels and more of a demo than an actual sequel. Many of the concepts featured in these levels were later used in a Super Nintendo Entertainment System game titled Danger Dan, which was also unfinished. Both games were re-released under the budget label Kixx.

== Reception ==
Reception

Review score
Publication	Score
Amstrad Action	97%

Awards
Publication	Award
Crash	Crash Smash
Your Sinclair	Megagame
Amstrad Action	Mastergame

The ZX Spectrum version fared well amongst its respective magazines. CRASH awarded the sequel game a "CRASH Smash" accolade with 90% in their issue #82. Your Sinclair also gave the game a 90 rating, calling the game superior to the original.

Amstrad Action gave the highest rating of the lot for the Amstrad version, and the highest rated game in AA history at the time, with a 97% rating and a "MasterGame" award. Computer and Video Games also gave the CPC version a high rating of 90%.

Zzap!64 reviewed the C64 version in issue 67 and gave it a 75%, ACE (Advanced Computer Entertainment magazine) awarded the same C64 game an 889 (out of a possible 1000) overall rating.

The Amiga game scored highly as well. CU Amiga gave an 89% rating and a "CU Screen Star" award in their November 1990 issue. Amiga Format awarded the Amiga game their 'Gold' award with a 92% rating. The game was ranked the 17th best game of all time by Amiga Power.

Atari ST reviews were also positive; The One gave the game an overall rating of 90%, while Zero magazine gave an overall 84% rating in its October 1990 review.
