= Creatures II: Torture Trouble =

1992 video game

- Cover art
- Developer: Apex Computer Productions
- Publisher: Thalamus Ltd
- Platform: Commodore 64
- Release: NA: 1992; EU: 1992
- Genre: Platform
- Mode: Single-player

Creatures II: Torture Trouble is a platform game for the Commodore 64 computer, released in 1992. It was developed by Apex Computer Productions, the company started by two brothers, John Rowlands (who wrote the code) and Steve Rowlands (who created the graphics and music). It is the sequel to Creatures.

== Gameplay ==
The game is composed of three islands, each with a set of stages that have to be completed. During torture screens, interludes, and island-hopping levels, bonus coins can be gathered for extra lives.

=== Torture screens ===
The first torture screen in Creatures 2

These levels offer a Heath Robinson situation in which one of Clyde's children has been placed. The player must figure out which actions to take in order to free his child. For example, in the first level shown in the screenshot, the player must navigate over the stepping stones and push the bomb down to the loose rock; then he must kill the monster in the middle and light the bomb. After this is done, the player must shoot the switch that is attached to the bicycle, detaching it from the generator and freeing his child. If this is not done in time, the child will be transported by the conveyor belt until he is under the rock-crushing machine, at which point he will be reduced to pulp.

=== Interludes ===
Following each torture screen are the interludes. These levels are fairly straightforward. A monster at the top right of the screen will throw Clyde's child over the edge. The player must then use the stretcher as a trampoline, bouncing the child safely to the other side.

=== Demon screens ===
After two torture screens and two interludes come the demon screens. The player must kill three demons of increasing size, by kicking small animals secreted from a Bug-O-Matic into pneumatic tubes at either end of the screen.

=== Island hoppin' ===
After clearing an island, it is time to move onto the next island. During Island Hoppin', Clyde is wearing scuba gear and must transport his children across a series of islands while avoiding various dangerous animals and monsters.

=== End sequence ===
After the last demon family has been destroyed, an end sequence follows wherein Clyde and his children capture the last remaining monster and kill it with a chainsaw.

=== Cheats ===
The built-in cheat in Creatures II is unorthodox. To gain infinite lives, the player must wait for the credits screen to appear, then wet their finger and quickly rub it across Joystick Port One. A big picture of Maximus Mouse (from the games Summer Camp and Winter Camp by Thalamus) will appear, waving his arms every time the player rubs their finger across the port. The player must repeatedly rub the port until Maximus Mouse turns grey, at which point the Fuzzy fountain will also flash to confirm that the cheat is now active.

== Reception ==
Creatures II was awarded 97% in Zzap!64 and 90% in Commodore Format.

== See also ==
- Mayhem in Monsterland
