= Monster Land =

Monster Land may refer to:

- Waiwai Monster Land (stylized as Y² Monster Land), a 1986 video game released by Epoch for the Super Cassette Vision
- Wonder Boy in Monster Land, the second game in the Wonder Boy series, first released for the arcade in 1987
- Mayhem in Monsterland, a 1993 Commodore 64 game
- Monsterland (TV series), an American anthology horror television series
- Monsterland (1985–1987), a Forrest J Ackerman horror-oriented magazine
