= Tech Advisor =

Tech website and digital magazine

Tech Advisor, formerly known as PC Advisor, is a consumer tech website and digital magazine published by Foundry. Foundry was previously a subsidiary of International Data Group (IDG, Inc.), which was acquired by Blackstone in 2021, but in March 2025 Foundry was acquired by Regent. Foundry also produces Macworld, PC World and TechHive.

Tech Advisor is a mobile brand, offering reviews and buying advice for the best phones, tablets and wearables, and hacks for improving your life using the technology that is always with you. These applications extend into controlling smart home tech and streaming, which are also covered by the website.

It originated with the 1995 launch of a localised UK and Ireland edition of the US-based PC World magazine. This was renamed PC Advisor to avoid confusion with an unrelated magazine and retailer. In 2017, around the time of the end of the print edition, the PC Advisor website was rebranded as Tech Advisor.

== Tech Advisor ==
Tech Advisor started out as techAdvisor.co.uk, a spin-off website "from the editors of PC Advisor and MacWorld".

In March 2017, the online version of PC Advisor- still at the "pcadvisor.co.uk" domain- adopted the Tech Advisor brand. In June 2017- around the same time that publication of PC Advisor's print edition ended- the rebranding from PC Advisor to Tech Advisor was completed with the move of the main website from "pcadvisor.co.uk" to "techadvisor.co.uk" (although the PC Advisor name was retained as part of Tech Advisor for certain pages and uses).

Tech Advisor continues to operate as both a website and monthly digital magazine focused on consumer and small business technology buying advice.

On 24 August 2020 a formal announcement was made that the Tech Advisor forums would close permanently on Wednesday 2 September 2020.

In April 2021, Tech Advisor moved from a UK ccTLD (.co.uk) to a gTLD (.com) domain, focused primarily on smartphones, tablets, and wearables, but also covering smart home and appliances, and entertainment.

In February 2022, Tech Advisor publisher IDG Communications was formally renamed Foundry.

== PC Advisor ==
PC Advisor
- Frequency: Monthly
- Publisher: IDG
- First issue: August 1995
- Final issue Number: July 2017; 264
- Country: United Kingdom

PC Advisor magazine offered advice on various aspects of PCs, related items such as digital photography, the internet, security and smartphones, and other personal-technology products and services.

PC Advisor was the UK & Ireland edition of IDG's PCWorld (another discontinued magazine called Personal Computer World and a PC World retailer – neither related to the PCWorld magazine – already existed in the UK).

PC Advisor's slogan was "Expert Advice You Can Trust".

Each month PC Advisor ran tests on various areas of the IT world from new pre-built desktop computers and laptops, LCD displays, graphics cards, motherboards, PDAs, wireless network routers, printers and many more. The magazine also included many reviews from products across the IT board including phones and accessories, cameras, and software from a wide range of vendors.

Each issue of the magazine featured a cover disc - either a DVD or a CD. The discs contained full-version commercial software products, as well as commercial software demos. In 2010 PC Advisor also became one of the first UK ESD (electronic software delivery) vendors of Microsoft's Windows 7 and Office 2010 products.

PC Advisor's website hosted one of Europe's largest online communities with its tech forums and was considered one of the most popular technology magazine websites.

=== History ===
The print publication first appeared on UK news-stands in August 1995 with an October cover date. The website was launched in 1996.

In 2007, PC Advisor print magazine had an audited rate base of 65,160 readers (ABC audit: Jan-Dec 06) and a claimed 195,480 readers.

PC Advisor's editorial team routinely recommended best-in-class hardware and software products, while the PC Advisor Awards ran annually, with awards chosen by a combination of the editorial team and readers. In 2009 it also ran a UK Broadband Survey in association with Broadband Genie, and published Home Broadband Surveys annually.

In 1997, PC Advisor was given an official seal of Approval by the British Association of Criminal Experts. It achieved a '3-star' rating in three different categories, which is the highest level of rating for a non-forensic and expert publication. The magazine received 3 stars in each of the following categories; Academic Opinion, use as a Reference Source and use of Plain English.

The editorial team behind PC Advisor was awarded Content Team of the Year in the 2014 British Media Awards.

In 2016 PC Advisor was recognised as the UK's most popular tech website by Hitwise.

PC Advisor ran for 264 issues, with the last being July 2017.

== See also ==
- Computer Shopper
- PC Format
- PC Plus
- PC Pro
- Personal Computer World
