= Xiaomi Mi Mix Fold =

Foldable Android smartphone by Xiaomi

Xiaomi Mi MIX Fold

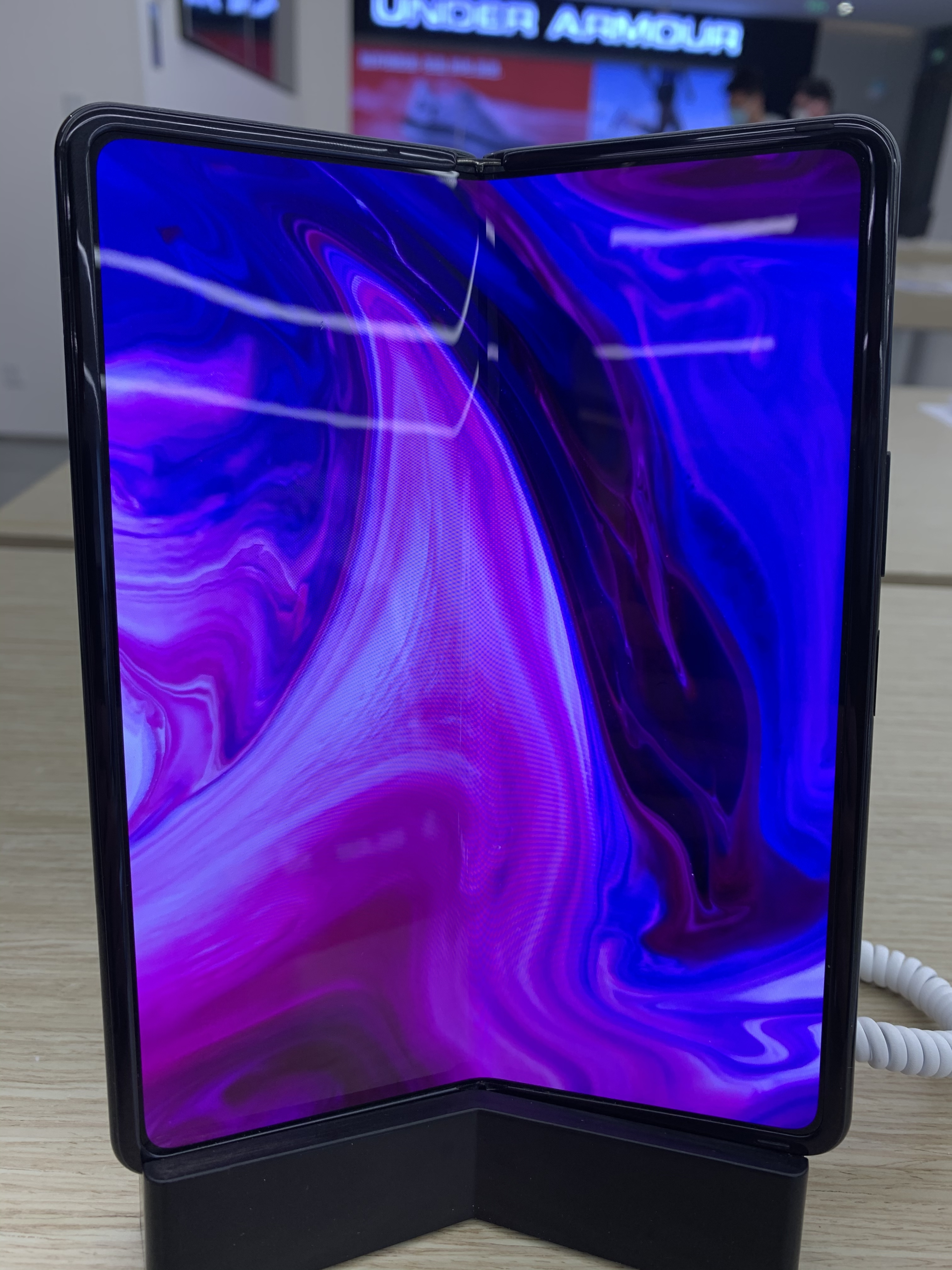
- Brand: Xiaomi
- Manufacturer: Xiaomi
- Type: Foldable smartphone
- Series: MIX Fold
- First released: 16 April 2021; 5 years ago
- Successor: Xiaomi MIX Fold 2
- Compatible networks: GSM / CDMA / HSPA / EVDO / LTE / 5G
- Form factor: Phablet
- Colors: Black, Ceramic
- Dimensions: Unfolded: 173.3 mm (6.82 in) H 133.4 mm (5.25 in) W 7.6 mm (0.30 in) D; Folded: 173.3 mm (6.82 in) H 69.8 mm (2.75 in) W 17.2 mm (0.68 in) D
- Operating system: Initial: Android 10 with MIUI 12; Current: Android 13 with Xiaomi HyperOS
- System-on-chip: Qualcomm Snapdragon 888 5G (5 nm)
- CPU: Octa-core (1x2.84 GHz Cortex-X1 & 3x2.42 GHz Cortex-A78 & 4x1.80 GHz Cortex-A55)
- GPU: Adreno 660
- Memory: 12/16 GB RAM
- Storage: 256/512 GB UFS 3.1
- Battery: 5020 mAh
- Display: 8.01 in (203 mm); 1860 x 2480 pixels, 4:3 ratio (~387 ppi density); Foldable OLED
- External display: 6.52 in (166 mm); 840 x 2520 pixels, 27:9 ratio; AMOLED

Xiaomi Mi MIX Fold is an Android-based foldable smartphone manufactured by Xiaomi. Unveiled on 30 March 2021, and released on 16 April 2021, this is Xiaomi's first attempt at a Foldable smartphone.

== Specifications ==
The Mi MIX Fold has two displays, one outer 6.52-inch AMOLED display for when the device is closed and an inner 8.01-inch AMOLED display when unfolded. Xiaomi rated the hinge in the phone to last at least 200,000 bends and the flexible screen for 1 million folds. The phone is powered by the Qualcomm Snapdragon 888 and can have either 12 or 16 GB of RAM. It also has a 5020 mAh battery.
