= Xiaomi Mix Fold 2 =

Foldable Android smartphone by Xiaomi

Xiaomi MIX Fold 2
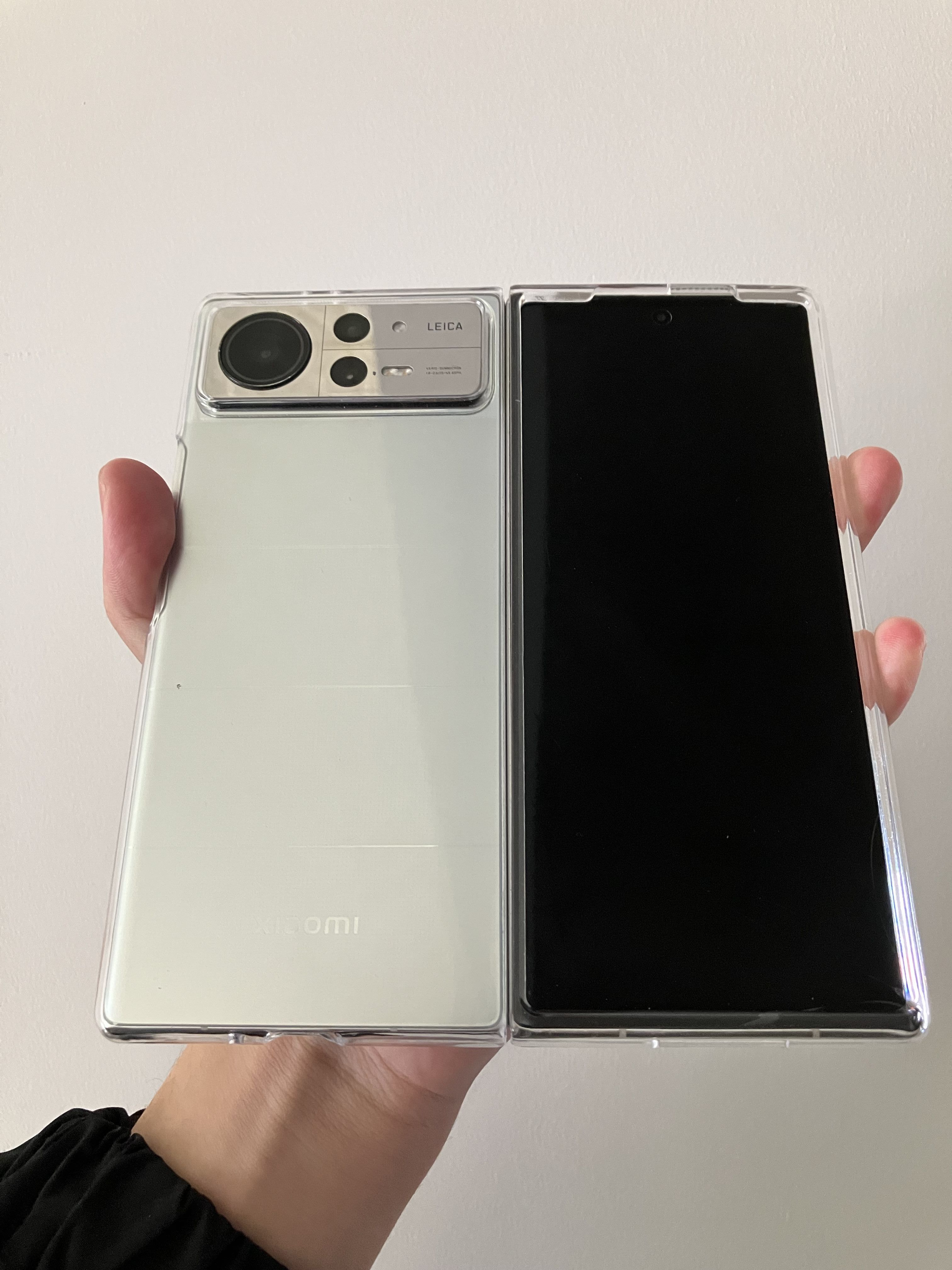
- Manufacturer: Xiaomi
- Type: Foldable smartphone
- Series: MIX Fold
- First released: August 11, 2022; 3 years ago
- Predecessor: Xiaomi Mi MIX Fold
- Successor: Xiaomi MIX Fold 3
- Compatible networks: GSM / CDMA / HSPA / EVDO / LTE / 5G
- Form factor: Phablet
- Colors: Black, Gold
- Dimensions: Unfolded: 161.1 mm (6.34 in) H 144.7 mm (5.70 in) W 5.4 mm (0.21 in) D; Folded: 161.1 mm (6.34 in) H 73.9 mm (2.91 in) W 11.2 mm (0.44 in) D
- Weight: 262 g (9.2 oz)
- Operating system: Initial: Android 12 with MIUI Fold 13; Current: Android 15 with Xiaomi HyperOS 2
- System-on-chip: Qualcomm Snapdragon 8+ Gen 1 (4 nm)
- CPU: Octa-core (1x3.19 GHz Cortex-X2 & 3x2.75 GHz Cortex-A710 & 4x1.80 GHz Cortex-A510)
- GPU: Adreno 730
- Memory: 12 GB RAM
- Storage: 256, 512 GB or 1 TB UFS 3.1
- SIM: Dual SIM (Nano-SIM, dual stand-by)
- Battery: 4500 mAh
- Charging: Fast charging 67W; Power Delivery 3.0; Quick Charge 4+
- Rear camera: 50 MP, f/1.8, (wide), 1/1.56", 1.0µm, PDAF, OIS; 8 MP, f/2.6, 45mm (telephoto), Dual Pixel PDAF, 2x optical zoom; 13 MP, f/2.4, 15mm, 123˚ (ultrawide), 1.12µm; Dual LED flash, HDR, panorama, Leica lenses; 8K@24/30fps, 4K@30/60fps, 1080p@30/60/120/240/960fps, gyro-EIS
- Front camera: 20 MP, 27mm (wide), 1/3.4", 0.8µm; HDR, panorama; 1080p@30/60fps, 720p@120fps
- Display: 8.02 in (204 mm); 1914 x 2160 px resolution (~360 ppi density); Foldable LTPO2 OLED, 1B colours, 120Hz, HDR10+, Dolby Vision, 1000 nits (HBM), 1300 nits (peak); Schott UTG glass
- External display: AMOLED, 120Hz, HDR10+, Dolby Vision, 1000 nits (HBM), 1300 nits (peak); 6.56 in (167 mm), 1080 x 2520 pixels, 21:9 ratio; Corning Gorilla Glass Victus
- Sound: Harman Kardon stereo speakers
- Connectivity: Wi-Fi 802.11 a/b/g/n/ac/6e, dual-band, Wi-Fi Direct, hotspot Bluetooth 5.2, A2DP, LE
- Model: 22061218C
- Codename: zizhan

Xiaomi MIX Fold 2 is an Android-based foldable smartphone manufactured by Xiaomi. For the first time in the MIX Fold series, the phone developed in partnership with Leica camera, it was announced on August 11, 2022.

A feature of MIX Fold 2 is its thickness: 5.4 mm in the unfolded state and 11.2 mm in the folded state, in this state, its thickness is close to ordinary smartphones, and this thickness also makes it the thinnest smartphone with a foldable display after the Huawei Mate Xs 2.

== Design ==
The external screen is made of Corning Gorilla Glass Victus. The inner screen is made of plastic Schott UTG glass. The back panel is made of glass. The ends are made of aluminum.

The main camera unit is made in the style of Redmi K50 Ultra, but it is placed in a horizontal position.

The USB-C connector, speaker and microphone are located below. On top are the second speaker, a slot for 2 SIM cards, a second microphone and an IR port. On the right side are volume buttons and a button to lock the smartphone, which has a built-in fingerprint scanner.

Xiaomi MIX Fold 2 is sold in 4 colors: Moon Shadow Black (black), Star Gold (gold), Night Black (black with matte blocks) and Moonlight Silver (silver with matte blocks).

== Specifications ==
=== Platform ===
The smartphone received a Qualcomm Snapdragon 8+ Gen 1 processor and an Adreno 730 GPU.

=== Battery ===
MIX Fold 2 has a battery with a capacity of 4500 mAh and support for 67-watt fast charging.

=== Camera ===
The smartphone received a main triple camera of 50 MP, f/1.8 (wide-angle) + 8 MP, f/2.6 (telephoto lens) + 13 MP, f/2.4 (ultra-wide-angle) with Dual Pixel phase autofocus and the ability to record video in 8K@24fps resolution. Also, like the Xiaomi 12S line, the MIX Fold 2 received Leica optics for rear cameras, as well as additional modes. The front camera received a resolution of 20 MP (wide-angle) and the ability to record video in 1080p@60fps resolution.

=== Screen ===
The internal screen is a flexible LTPO 2.0 Eco² OLED-matrix, 8.02", 2480 × 1914 with a pixel density of 360 ppi and support for HDR10+ and Dolby Vision technologies.

The smartphone also received an external AMOLED screen, 6.56", FullHD+ 2520 × 1080 with an aspect ratio of 21:9, a display refresh rate of 120 Hz, support for HDR10+ and Dolby Vision technologies, and a round cut-out for the front camera located top in the center.

=== Sound ===
The smartphone received stereo speakers developed in cooperation with Harman Kardon. Speakers are located on the upper and lower ends.

=== Memory ===
The device is sold in 12 GB/256 GB, 12 GB/515 GB and 12 GB/1 TB.

=== Software ===
The smartphone was released on MIUI Fold 13 based on Android 12. Later, it was updated to Xiaomi HyperOS 2 based on Android 15.

== See also ==
- Samsung Galaxy Z Fold 4
- Foldable smartphone
