= Xiaomi Mix Fold 4 =

Foldable Android smartphone by Xiaomi

Xiaomi MIX Fold 4
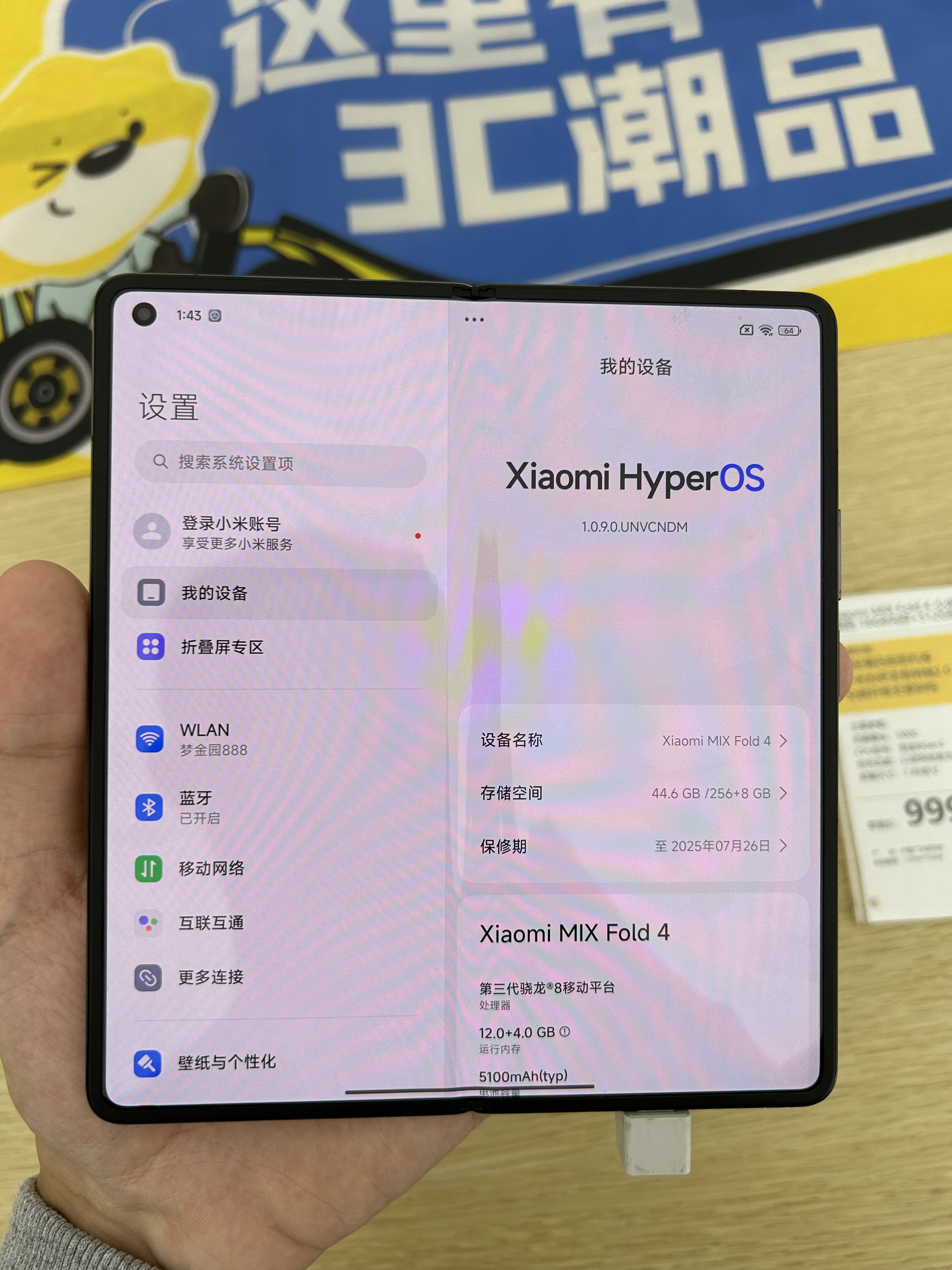
- Xiaomi MIX Fold 4, unfolded
- Manufacturer: Xiaomi
- Type: Foldable smartphone
- Series: MIX
- Family: Xiaomi
- First released: 2024, July 19
- Availability by region: 2024, July 19; China
- Predecessor: Xiaomi MIX Fold 3
- Related: Xiaomi MIX Flip
- Compatible networks: GSM / CDMA / HSPA / EVDO / LTE / 5G
- Form factor: Foldable
- Colors: Black, White, Blue
- Dimensions: Unfolded: 159.4 x 143.3 x 4.6 mm Folded: 159.4 x 73.1 x 9.5 mm
- Weight: 226 g or 228 g (7.97 oz)
- Operating system: Original: Android 14, Xiaomi HyperOS; Current: Android 15, Xiaomi HyperOS 2
- System-on-chip: Qualcomm SM8650-AB Snapdragon 8 Gen 3 (4 nm)
- CPU: Octa-core (1x3.3 GHz Cortex-X4 & 3x3.2 GHz Cortex-A720 & 2x3.0 GHz Cortex-A720 & 2x2.3 GHz Cortex-A520)
- GPU: Adreno 750
- Memory: 12 GB / 16 GB
- Storage: 256 GB, 512 GB, 1 TB (UFS 4.0)
- Removable storage: None
- SIM: Nano-SIM + Nano-SIM
- Battery: Li-Po 5100 mAh, non-removable
- Charging: 67W wired, PD3.0, QC4, 31% in 10 min 50W wireless, 24% in 10 min
- Rear camera: 50 MP, f/1.7, 23mm (wide), 1/1.49", 1.0µm, PDAF, OIS; 50 MP, f/2.0, 47mm (telephoto), PDAF, OIS, 2x optical zoom; 10 MP, f/2.9, 115mm (periscope telephoto), PDAF, OIS, 5x optical zoom; 12 MP, f/2.2, 15mm, 120˚ (ultrawide); Laser AF, color spectrum sensor, LED flash, HDR, panorama, Leica lenses; 8K@24fps, 4K@24/30/60fps, 1080p@30/60/120/240/960fps, 720p@1920fps, Dolby Vision HDR
- Front camera: 16 MP, (wide); Cover camera: 16 MP, (wide); Dolby Vision HDR; 1080p@30/60fps
- Display: Foldable LTPO AMOLED, 1B colors, 120Hz, HDR10+, Dolby Vision, 1700 nits (HBM), 3000 nits (peak), 7.98 inches (~89.4% screen-to-body ratio), 2224 x 2488 pixels (~418 ppi)
- External display: LTPO AMOLED, 68B colors, 120Hz, HDR10+, Dolby Vision, 1700 nits (HBM), 3000 nits (peak), 6.56 inches, 1080 x 2520 pixels, 21:9 ratio Scratch/drop-resistant glass
- Sound: Stereo speakers, 24-bit/192kHz Hi-Res & Hi-Res Wireless audio, Snapdragon Sound
- Connectivity: Wi-Fi 802.11 a/b/g/n/ac/6e/7, dual-band (tri-band after SW update), Wi-Fi Direct, Bluetooth 5.4, A2DP, LE, aptX HD, aptX Adaptive, LHDC, NFC, Infrared port, USB Type-C 3.2, OTG
- Water resistance: IPX8 (immersible up to 1.5m for 30 min)
- Model: 24072PX77C
- Codename: goku
- Made in: China
- Other: Two-way satellite communication (calls, messages)

Xiaomi MIX Fold 4 is an Android-based foldable smartphone manufactured by Xiaomi. It was released in 2024 and sold exclusively in China.

When released, it was one of the thinnest commercially available book-style foldable phones, at 9.47mm when closed and 4.6mm when opened. According to Xiaomi, the thinness was achieved with an "all-carbon architecture", including a hinge made with carbon fiber.

It has four cameras. It supports both wired and wireless charging.

== Reception ==
Reception of the Mix Fold 4 was negatively impacted by problems with software and user experience. Tom's Guide called the phone solid and praised its display and battery life but said its camera was disappointing. According to a 2025 report, Xiaomi was planning to release a new model in 2026 that would address some of the flaws of the Mix Fold 4.

A review in the South China Morning Post praised the model's thinness, sleekness, and lightness. It also spoke positively about the display, performance, and cameras, but stated that these features were not innovations compared to existing foldable phones.

== Gallery ==
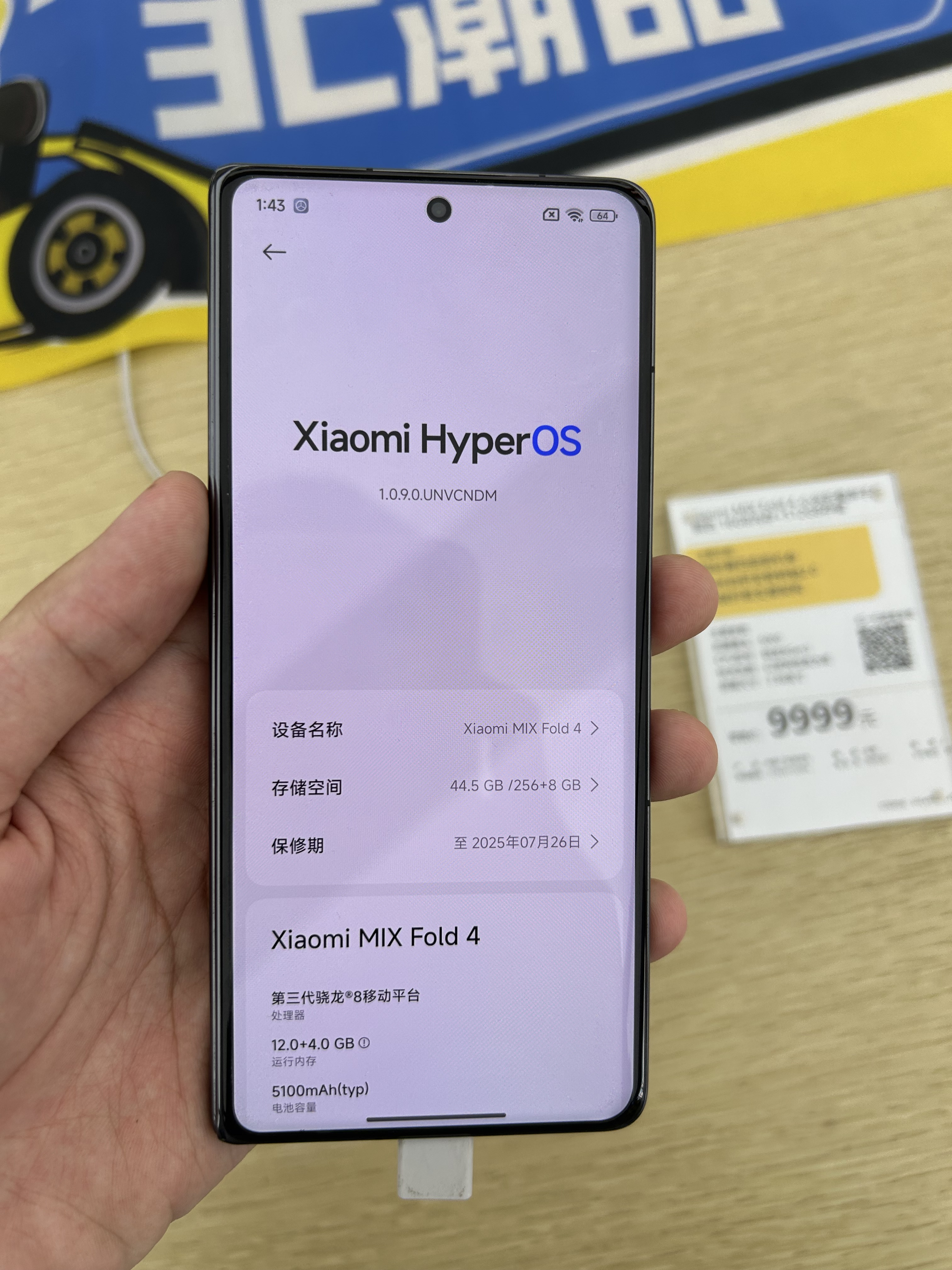
Folded, front

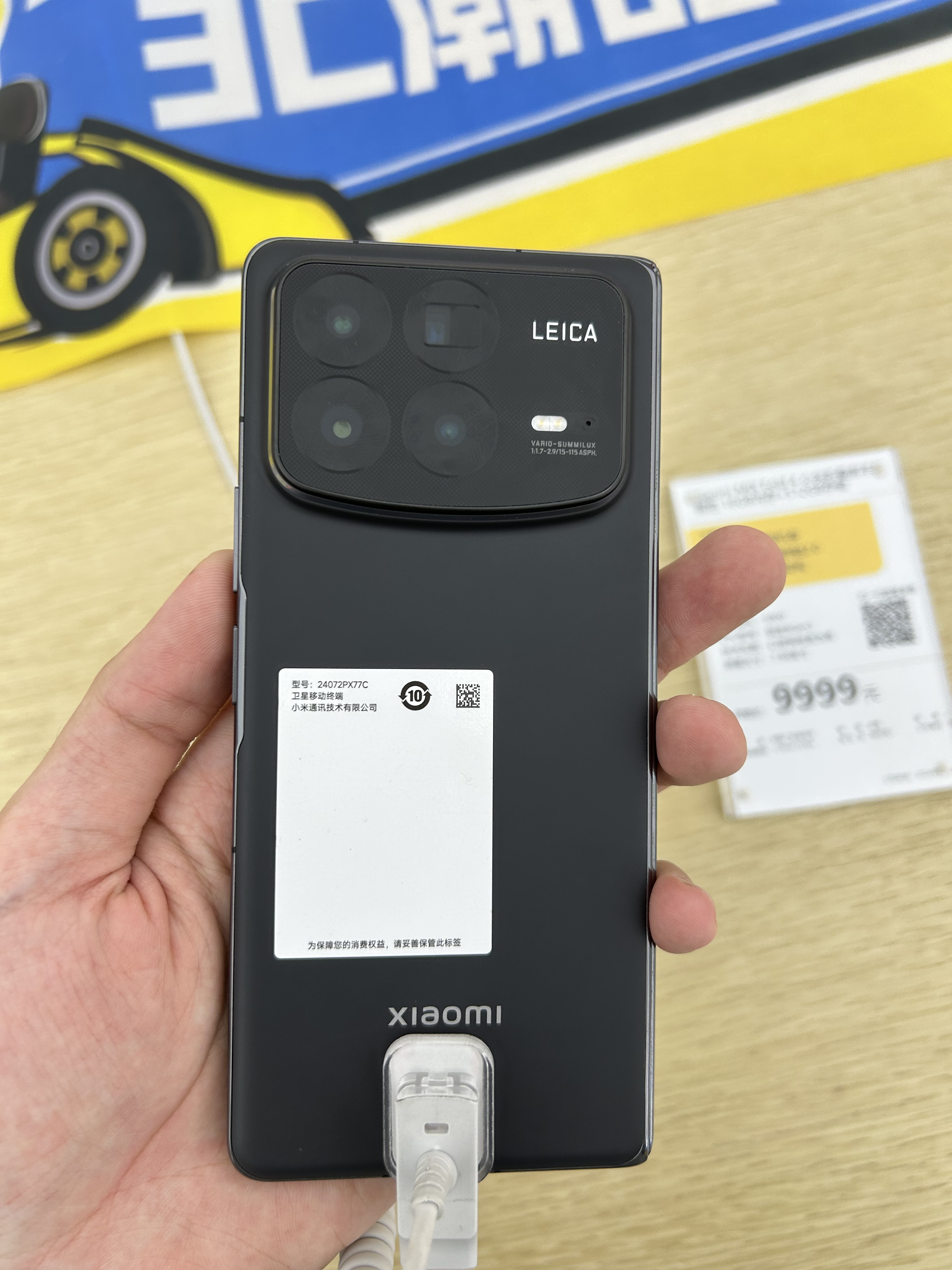
Folded, back

== See also ==
- Samsung Galaxy Z Fold 7
- Foldable smartphone
