= Steve Jarratt =

British journalist

Steve Jarratt is a long-time video game journalist and magazine editor. He has launched a large number of magazines for Future Publishing, many of which are still published. Magazines he has worked for include:

- Zzap!64: Reviewer and assistant editor (March 1987 – May 1988)
- CRASH: Editor (April–July 1988)
- CU Amiga: Reviewer (approx. late 1988)
- Amiga Format: Writer and reviewer (August 1989–?), editor (June 1994 – Jan 1995)
- S: The Sega Magazine: Launch editor (December 1989–?)
- Commodore Format: Launch editor (October 1990 – early 1992)
- Total!: Launch editor (January 1992 - late 1993)
- Edge: Launch editor (1993–?)
- Official UK PlayStation Magazine
- T3: Launch editor (1997–?)
- Laptop Magazine: Launch editor (September-November 2003)
- 3D World
- Official Nintendo Magazine: Group Senior Editor 12 February 2006 (2006–?)
- Windows Vista: The Official Magazine: Editor-in-chief (2007)

As Group Senior Editor at Future Publishing, he oversaw existing titles like SFX, Practical Classics, 3D World and Official Xbox Magazine. He won the Games Media Legend award at the 2008 Games Media Awards but left Future Publishing in 2011. He went on to work for a small digital publisher in Bristol.

Jarratt listed Elite, GoldenEye 007, The Legend of Zelda: Ocarina of Time, Mercenary, Ridge Racer, Street Fighter II for the Super Nintendo Entertainment System, Super Mario World, Tetris for the Game Boy, Tomb Raider, and XCOM as his favorite games in 2000.

== Works cited ==
- "The 100 best games of all time". Edge. No. 80. Future plc. 2000.
