= Paul Glancey =

British journalist

Paul Glancey is a video game producer and former journalist in the United Kingdom. He made his first steps into the videogame industry as a writer with Zzap!64 and CVG before contributing a few reviews to Mean Machines (Wrestle War in issue 9 was the first). Like Julian Rignall and Richard Leadbetter, he tended to appear in both EMAP magazines at the same time.

He went on to launch MegaTech — the first UK Mega Drive only magazine. This was an impressive publication, which, at its peak, had a monthly sale of over 40,000 copies. Ultimately, its publisher, EMAP Images, sold the magazine to Maverick Magazines, the publisher of a competing magazine called Mega Drive Advanced Gaming. Shortly after MegaTech was bought, Maverick closed it down.

After ten years in videogames journalism Paul moved into the business itself by becoming the Senior Game Evaluator at publisher Eidos Interactive from 1998 to 2000.

He has worked as a Senior Producer at Electronic Arts' Criterion studio in Guildford, UK. Criterion has developed the best-selling Burnout series and 'gun porn' shooter Black. After that, Paul worked at BlackRock Studio followed by a period as Game Design Manager at Ubisoft Reflections. He was a Senior Designer/Producer at Criterion. In September 2021 Glancey became a Design Manager at Double Eleven Limited.
