= MegaTech =

British video games magazine

- MegaTech #1, XMAS 1991
- Editor: Paul Glancey; Steve Merrett; Julian Rignall
- Categories: Video game magazines
- Frequency: Monthly
- First issue: XMAS 1991
- Final issue: 1994
- Company: EMAP; Maverick Magazines
- Country: United Kingdom
- Language: English
- ISSN: 0964-5764

MegaTech (sometimes styled with the katakana メガテケ) was a publication from EMAP aimed specifically at the Sega Mega Drive gaming market. The magazine was started in 1991. The launch editorial consisted of a small team including Paul Glancey (editor) and Mark Patterson (deputy editor). It was published monthly. In 1993 the magazine was acquired by Maverick Magazines. It ceased publication in 1994 when it was merged into Mega magazine.

Founding editor Paul Glancey spoke about the magazine's difficult launch, evolution and eventual closure, in a 2022 retrospective article, The MegaTech story: An oral history.
