= Xiaomi Mix Fold 3 =

2023 foldable flagship smartphone by Xiaomi

Xiaomi MIX Fold 3
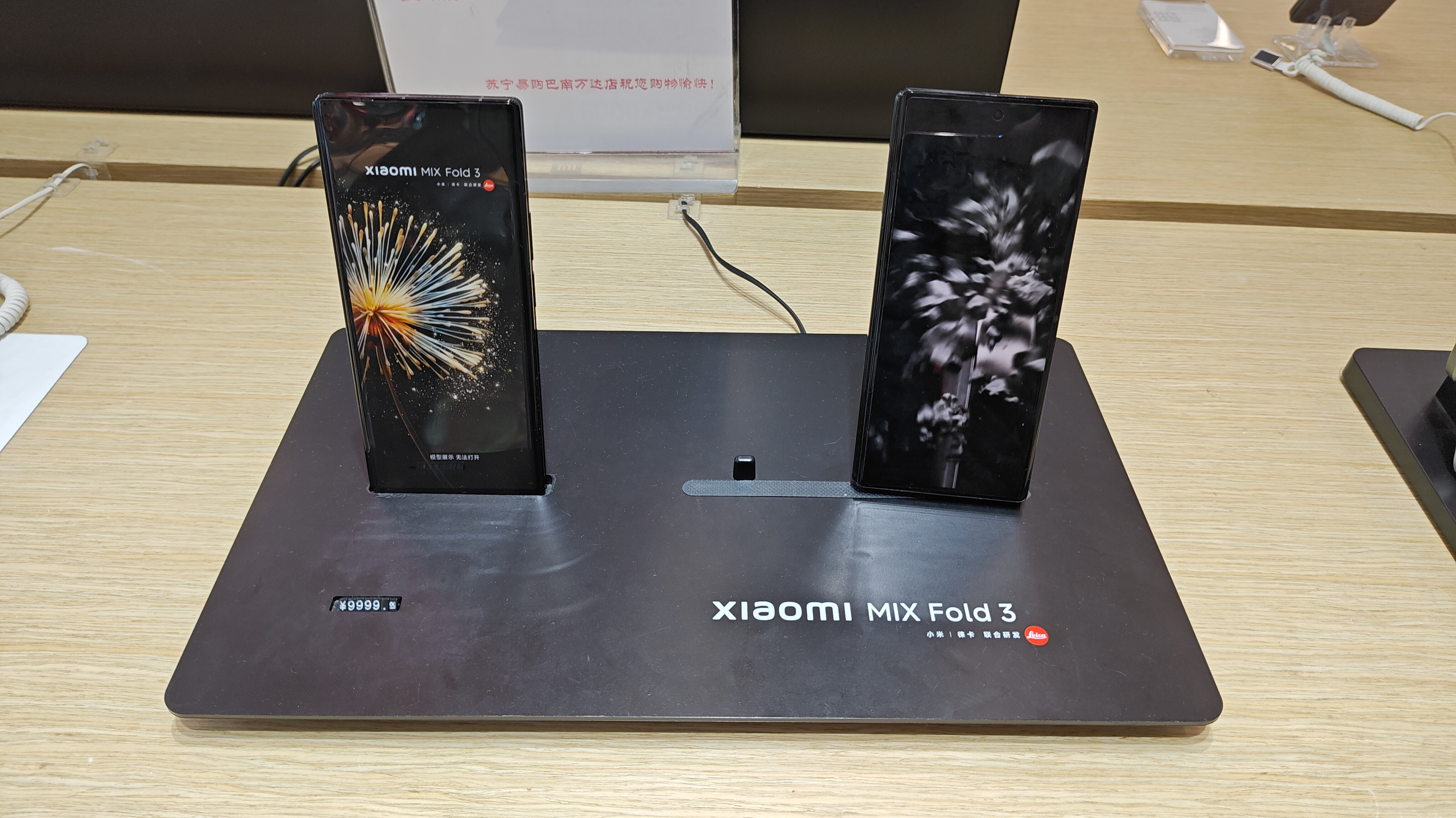
- Developer: Xiaomi
- Manufacturer: Xiaomi
- Type: Foldable smartphone
- Series: MIX series
- First released: August 14, 2023; 3 years ago
- Predecessor: Xiaomi MIX Fold 2
- Successor: Xiaomi MIX Fold 4
- Compatible networks: GSM / CDMA / HSPA / EVDO / LTE / 5G
- Form factor: Foldable slate
- Colors: Black; Gold
- Dimensions: Unfolded: 161.2 mm × 143.3 mm × 5.3 mm (6.35 in × 5.64 in × 0.21 in); Folded: 161.2 mm × 73.5 mm × 10.9 mm (6.35 in × 2.89 in × 0.43 in)
- Weight: 255 g (9.0 oz) or 259 g (9.1 oz)
- Operating system: Original: Android 13 with MIUI Fold 14; Current: Android 15 with Xiaomi HyperOS 2
- System-on-chip: Qualcomm Snapdragon 8 Gen 2 (4 nm)
- CPU: Octa-core (1x3.36 GHz Cortex-X3 & 2x2.8 GHz Cortex-A715 & 2x2.8 GHz Cortex-A710 & 3x2.0 GHz Cortex-A510)
- GPU: Adreno 740
- Memory: 12 GB or 16 GB LPDDR5X
- Storage: 256 GB, 512 GB, or 1 TB UFS 4.0
- SIM: Nano-SIM + Nano-SIM
- Battery: 4800 mAh Li-Po
- Charging: 67W wired, 100% in 40 min (PD3.0, QC4); 50W wireless, 100% in 55 min
- Rear camera: 50 MP, f/1.8, 23 mm (wide), 1/1.49", 1.0μm, PDAF, OIS; 10 MP, f/2.0, 75 mm (3.2x telephoto), OIS; 10 MP, f/2.9, 115 mm (5x periscope telephoto), OIS; 12 MP, f/2.2, 15 mm (ultrawide), 120˚ FOV; Leica optics, LED flash, HDR, panorama, color spectrum sensor; Video: 8K@24fps, 4K@24/30/60fps, 1080p@30/60/120/240/960/1920fps, Dolby Vision HDR
- Front camera: 20 MP, f/2.3, 23 mm (wide), HDR, panorama: Video: 1080p@30/60fps
- Display: Main: 8.03 in (204 mm) Foldable LTPO OLED+, 1B colors, 120Hz, HDR10+, Dolby Vision, 1300 nits (peak), 1916×2160 px (~360 ppi); Cover: 6.56 in (167 mm) AMOLED, 120Hz, HDR10+, Dolby Vision, 2600 nits (peak), 1080×2520 px (21:9), Gorilla Glass Victus 2
- Sound: Stereo speakers 24-bit/192kHz Hi-Res & Hi-Res wireless audio Tuned by Harman Kardon
- Connectivity: Wi-Fi 802.11 a/b/g/n/ac/6e/7 (tri-band capable); Bluetooth 5.3 (A2DP, LE); NFC; Infrared port USB-C 3.2 OTG; GPS, GLONASS, BDS, Galileo, QZSS, NavIC
- Other: Side-mounted fingerprint sensor, aluminum frame, aramid fiber or glass back, barometer
- Website: mi.com/global/

Xiaomi MIX Fold 3 is a foldable flagship smartphone developed by Xiaomi and officially announced on August 14, 2023. It is the third generation of Xiaomi's MIX Fold lineup and builds upon its predecessor with a stronger hinge design, upgraded camera system and a more refined form factor.

The MIX Fold 3 features a foldable 8.03-inch LTPO OLED+ display with a peak brightness of 1300 nits. The cover screen is a 6.56-inch AMOLED panel with a peak brightness of up to 2600 nits.

Internally, it is powered by the Qualcomm Snapdragon 8 Gen 2 chipset with up to 16 GB RAM and 1 TB of UFS 4.0 storage. It runs Android 13 with Xiaomi's custom HyperOS, and is upgradeable to Android 14.

The quad-camera setup includes two telephoto lenses (3.2x and 5x optical zoom), a 50 MP main sensor, and a 12 MP ultrawide sensor. Video capabilities include up to 8K at 24 fps and 4K at up to 60 fps, with support for Dolby Vision HDR. Both the main and cover displays feature identical 20 MP selfie cameras.
