= Mayhem in Monsterland =

1993 video game

- Developer: Apex Computer Productions
- Publisher: Apex Computer Productions
- Designers: John Rowlands; Steve Rowlands; Andy Roberts
- Platform: Commodore 64
- Release: EU: 1993
- Genre: Platform
- Mode: Single-player

Mayhem in Monsterland is a 1993 platform game for the Commodore 64. Its titular hero, "Mayhem", is a yellow triceratops blessed with the gift of speed. His goal is to return his world from sad to happy, ridding the world of monsters along the way.

== Plot ==
An apprentice magician dinosaur living in Monsterland, Theo Saurus, made a mistake while practising a spell one day. He turned the lands Jellyland, Pipeland, Spottyland, Cherryland, and Rockland into sad places, void of color or life. Theo began living in a hidden cave to avoid the wrath of the other monsters until discovered one day by the hero of the story, Mayhem. Mayhem promised to bring Theo the necessary magic dust to transform Monsterland to its previous happy state.

== Gameplay ==
Gameplay screenshot

At the beginning of each stage the goals are displayed to the player. There are two types of quota to be met. The first is magic dust quota where enemies must be defeated to gain magic dust. Enemies may be killed in two ways. Enemies may be bounced on. Mayhem bounces upwards a small amount when destroying an enemy like this. Once the lightning power up has been obtained, enemies may also be charged at with speed in a special attack. Monsters are not always simple to dispatch as some have spikes and others shells. Soft spots on such enemies have to be found by the player in order to defeat them.

Happier music plays once all the enemies are defeated. It is then a race against the clock to collect the quota of stars and to get to the exit to complete the stage. The faster a star is rotating, the more points it is worth. If all stars are collected on a stage, then the player can receive a Super-Star bonus, but only on the first and last stage of the game on the cassette and disk versions of the game.

== Development ==
Mayhem in Monsterland was produced by Apex Computer Productions, who had previously made Creatures and Creatures 2, which featured Clyde Radcliffe as the main character. Mayhem was far lighter in tone than Creatures, which featured end-of-level action puzzles that, if not successfully accomplished, meant death by various gruesome means.

The developers used special techniques to allow the then 12 year old C64 to process gameplay at previously unseen speeds.

== Reception ==
Reception

Review scores
Publication	Score
Eurogamer	9/10, 8/10
Nintendo Life	9/10
Retro Gamer	94%
64'er	9/10
Commodore Force	97%
Commodore Format	100%
Play Time	65%
Top Secret	10/10

Mayhem in Monsterland received acclaim from critics.

== Legacy ==
The game was released on the European Virtual Console online store for the Nintendo Wii system on 17 October 2008.

In 2009, a 15th Anniversary Edition of the game was released on cassette and disk by British retro publisher Psytronik Software. The same publisher later released a 25th Anniversary Edition in 2019.

A new game for mobile phones starring Mayhem, Mayhem's Magic Dust, was released in 2004. It was developed by Infinite Lives.
