= Creatures (1990 video game) =

1990 Platformer

- Cover art of Creatures (C64 version)
- Developer: Apex Computer Productions
- Publisher: Thalamus Ltd
- Designers: John Rowlands; Steve Rowlands
- Artist: Steve Rowlands
- Composer: Steve Rowlands
- Platforms: Commodore 64; Amiga; Atari ST
- Release: Amiga: NA: 1993; Atari ST: NA: 1992; Commodore 64: NA: 1990
- Genres: Puzzle, Platform
- Mode: Single-player

Creatures is a platform game for the Commodore 64 computer developed by Apex Computer Productions and released in 1990. The game was made by two brothers who were founders of the company, John Rowlands (programming) and Steve Rowlands (music and visual design). It was later ported by WJS Design for Atari ST and released in 1992 and to the Amiga in 1993.

The backronym "Clyde Radcliffe Exterminates All The Unfriendly Repulsive Earth-ridden Slime" is used as a subtitle for the game.

The game was followed by Creatures II: Torture Trouble in 1992.

== Plot ==
Amiga version gameplay screenshot

The game takes place on a fictional planet called Blot. This planet was previously an inhabitable place for a race of creatures called Blotians, but they were in great danger and had to build a spaceship and search for another suitable planet. The creatures were renamed the Fuzzy Wuzzies. The spaceship they built had to land due to a collision with an asteroid, and the only planet near them was Earth. Fuzzy Wuzzies landed in the Pacific Ocean near an unknown island where they built a city and named the island “The Happiest Place in The Known Universe”.

Another type of creature that is found in the game are demons. They live on the other side of the island that Fuzzy Wuzzies are living on. The characteristics of these two in-game creatures made them natural enemies. Demons invited the Fuzzy Wuzzies to a big party, captured them and locked them all up in a torture chamber.

The protagonist of the game is Clyde Radcliffe, a Fuzzy Wuzzy, who left the party before the demons' capture of Fuzzy Wuzzies. The game is about the journey of Clyde Radcliffe trying to save his species from the demons' torture chambers.

== Reception ==
The development of the game was chronicled in Zzap!64 magazines. ZZap64 gave Creatures a score of 96%, Gold Medal (issue 12/90).

== See also ==
- Mayhem in Monsterland
