= PC Answers =

issue 145 cover

PC Answers was a computer magazine published in the United Kingdom by Future plc.

It was notable for its focus on the technical side of computing. It ran several series of articles on overclocking, a "Danger! Don't Try This At Home!" section which reviewed hardware projects such as the Stone Soupercomputer and Tomohiro Kawada's dual Celeron PC. Its "Extreme Customisation" series reviewed alternate shells for Microsoft Windows such as Litestep and desktop enhancements such as Stardock's WindowBlinds.

PC Answers was reported to cease publication in September 2010. The title's last issue appeared in October 2010.
