= CPC Attack! =

UK video game magazine

- Issue 1
- Editor: Pat Kelly
- Technical editor: Rob Scott
- Sub-editor: Paul Hales
- Staff writers: Vic Barnes; Richard Fairhurst; Richard Wildey
- Categories: Computer magazine
- Frequency: Monthly
- Publisher: HHL Publishing
- First issue: June 1992
- Final issue Number: November 1992; 6
- Country: United Kingdom
- Based in: London, England
- Language: English
- OCLC: 807116186

CPC Attack! was a magazine dedicated to Amstrad CPC gaming. The magazine was a successor to Amstrad Computer User magazine. It was characterised by a strong comic-like graphical style featuring a recurring mascot - a Tank Girl-like character called Amy Strad. Funnily enough, this same character featured in C+VG magazine under the name Sadie. Originally, Amstrad Computer User had been a much more serious magazine than its main rival Amstrad Action. The radical redesign to CPC Attack! was probably an attempt to appeal to Amstrad Action readers.

The magazine only ran for six issues between June and November 1992. This may have been because it did not have a cover-mounted tape (like Amstrad Action) and was devoted entirely to gaming leaving little room for other computer uses, but was probably also due to the waning popularity of the Amstrad 8-bit computer systems. The magazine did give away a number of free gifts with its early issues, although their relevance to readers was questionable. Issue 1 came with a pair of 3D glasses and a poster.

The magazine also drew criticism for running features that promoted the new wave of 16-bit consoles such as the Mega Drive and SNES. CPC Attack! also openly dismissed its rival Amstrad Action within its pages on several occasions, which many readers thought was unnecessary and immature.
