= Total! =

Video game magazine (1991–1996)

- TOTAL! #1, January 1992
- Editor: Steve Jarratt
- Categories: Video game journalism
- Frequency: Monthly
- Founded: 1991
- First issue: January 1992
- Final issue Number: October 1996; 58
- Company: Future plc
- Country: United Kingdom
- Based in: Bath
- Language: English
- ISSN: 0964-9352

Total! was a video game magazine published in the United Kingdom by Future plc. It was published monthly for 58 issues, beginning in December 1991 (cover-dated January 1992), with the last issue bearing the cover-date October 1996. A "1993 Annual" featuring reprint material and a poster magazine were also released during the magazine's lifetime.

== Content ==
It focused on current and upcoming Nintendo consoles of the era, initially the NES and Game Boy, and then shared coverage with the SNES, Virtual Boy and Nintendo 64 as they were released. The arcade games Cruis'n USA, Killer Instinct and Killer Instinct 2 were also reviewed.

Each game review featured a rating out of 10 for the graphics, sound, gameplay and lifespan, plus an overall percentage score. The first Nintendo 64 game reviewed, Super Mario 64, was also the first game to receive the perfect score of 100%. Other notable high scores included 99% for Super Mario All-Stars on the SNES, in September 1993, and 98% each for Super Mario Bros. 3 on the NES and Super Mario World on the SNES, both in 1992. It is also notable for giving a score of 77% to Rise of the Robots, uncommonly high among reviews for this game.

== History ==
The magazine was launched by Steve Jarratt Editor, Wayne Allen Art Editor and Andy Dyer Staff Writer. Steve Jarratt and Andy Dyer were credited with writing all the reviews. They also appeared in the form of computer sprite-style pictures, with comic book-style speech bubbles on many pages, though these were dropped by the end of 1993. Further named staff writers were brought in, there were usually around four writers credited at a time from 1994 onwards. Jarratt left to become the launch editor of Edge. By 1992, the magazine was selling about 80,000 copies per issue.

The final issue featured "Gamefreak", a Q&A section carried over from sister-magazine Super Play that had ended the month before. Issue 58 was not planned to be the final issue as issue 59 was previewed in the back of the magazine. However shortly after release subscribers received a letter informing them that the magazine had ended.

During the last few years of its life subscribers to the magazine received an extra page in the form of "Total! Arena", a black and white insert featuring a brief summary of the corresponding issue's contents. Also featured on the page was "Fave Raves" where the current writers briefly mentioned their current favourite game - as a one-off this was changed to "Fave Daves" for issue 53's insert. There was also on occasion subscriber only competitions. There was no insert with the final issue.

The rights to the name were bought for a German magazine of the same name, which appeared from 1993 to 2000. The German-language TOTAL! was not a pure translation magazine, but a magazine with independent editorial work. It was characterized above all by reports and a rating system for video games based on the school grading system, and attempted to separate objective from subjective ratings.
