= PC Plus =

Defunct UK computer magazine

- Cover from 2003
- Editor: Martin Cooper
- Categories: Computer magazine
- Frequency: Monthly
- Founded: 1986
- Final issue: September 2012
- Company: Future plc
- Country: United Kingdom
- Language: English
- Website: web.archive.org/web/20080416215415/http://www.pcplus.co.uk/home
- ISSN: 0952-2565

PC Plus was a computer magazine published monthly from 1986 until September 2012 in the UK by Future plc. The magazine was aimed at intermediate to advanced PC users, computer professionals and enthusiasts. The magazine was specifically for users of PCs and related technologies so features articles were undiluted by coverage of other platforms. It began its life specifically as a magazine aimed at the Amstrad PC user.

== Staff ==
For many years, the editor (later editor-in-chief) was Dave Pearman. PC Plus print magazine was closed in October 2012, when the editor was Martin Cooper.

Each edition of the print magazine was centered on four main sections - news, reviews, features, and tutorials.

Under Pearman's editorship, the magazine was characterised by the inclusion of irreverent off-the-wall features and content including Huw Collingbourne's Rants and Raves, a serialisation of a fictional office entitled Group Efforts and the Bastard Operator From Hell. The magazine frequently drew on images of Bath, its office base, during multimedia tutorial articles.

Future plc. no longer publishes PC Plus as a print publication although the on-line domain is still serviced by parent brand TechRadar.com.
