= 8000 Plus =

Discontinued British computer magazine

- Categories: Computer magazine
- Frequency: Monthly
- Publisher: Future plc
- First issue: October 1986
- Final issue Number: December 1996; 124
- Country: United Kingdom
- Based in: Somerton, Somerset

8000 Plus (renamed PCW Plus early in 1992) was a monthly British magazine dedicated to the Amstrad PCW range of microcomputers. It was one of the earliest magazines from Future plc, and ran for just over ten years, the first issue being dated October 1986 and the last (as PCW Plus) being issue 124, dated Christmas 1996.

Science fiction writer David Langford wrote a regular column for 8000/PCW Plus, which ran (albeit not continuously) for the magazine's entire lifespan.
