= Commodore Format =

British computer magazine

- Issue #1, October 1990
- Former editors: Steve Jarratt; Collin Campbell; Trenton Webb; Andy Hutchinson; Dave Golder; Tim Norris & Karen Levell; Rebecca Lack; Karen Levell; Simon Forrester
- Categories: Computer magazine
- Frequency: Monthly
- Circulation: 50,135 (Jan – Jun '91); 55,178 (Jul – Dec '91); 60,045 (Jan – Jun '92); 44,442 (Jul – Dec '92); 41,626 (Jan – Jun '93); 25,063 (Jul – Dec '93)
- First issue: October 1990
- Final issue Number: October 1995; Issue 61
- Company: Future plc
- Country: United Kingdom
- Based in: Bath
- Language: English
- ISSN: 0960-5169

Commodore Format was a British magazine for users of the Commodore 64 home computer. It was published on the third Thursday of every month. All 61 issues were produced by Future plc. These came towards the end of the machine's commercial life - from October 1990 until October 1995. The magazine would however be in publication for two more years after commercial software for the machine ceased, in which articles were mainly tech-related and reviews of new games were from Public Domain publishers.

== Launch ==
The launch editorial staff was dominated by journalists who had worked on Zzap!64, including editor Steve Jarratt. Sean Masterson was Steve's deputy. Contributions came from Gordon Houghton and Kati Hamza. There was one fresh face - staff writer, Andy Dyer.

The first issue previewed the new cartridge-based C64 GS (Games System). The magazine had 98 pages and came with a games tape known as the "Power Pack". Issue one's tape included a playable preview of upcoming arcade conversion Iron Man, and the full version of Tau Ceti. It retailed for £1.95.

== Format ==
The magazine's content was varied, but heavily biased towards gaming. Each issue usually kicked off with a news section called "Network 64" - a round-up of the previous month's C64 stories. The section was renamed "Snippets" in later issues. After initially appearing at the very back of the magazine, the "Early Warning!" preview section usually followed. It featured a full-page submarine style "scanner" showing how near to release new games were. The scanner featured six rings; if a game was placed on the outer ring, it was six months from release. Graphics and charts like this made the magazine's information easy to digest and were common. The letters page was next. It featured "The Mighty Brain", a cartoon character noted for its arrogance in answering the readers' questions. "Andy Dyer's Gamebusters" (later by Andy Roberts) provided tips and cheats on the latest software releases, and Paul Lyons' "Inside Info" column answered technical questions. This section was latterly written by Jason Finch and renamed "Techie Tips". And every month there was a large review section of the latest games - those scoring over 90% received the "It's A Corker" accolade, and an "Uppers and Downers" box at the end of each review made it easy for readers to see just how good a game was at a glance.

One of Commodore Format′s most famous sections was "Roger Frames Buys Budjit Games". The budget game round-up was accompanied by a story told in three or four cartoons. Drawn by artist Mike Roberts, they were often inspired by the games Roger was playing. Famously, Roger appeared on the cover of the Codemasters game "Tilt". There was also a Roger Frames "UGH! GIRLS" T-shirt, and readers could send in photos of themselves or their friends if they thought they looked a bit like Roger. As Commodore 64 software became increasingly scarce, Roger's column was removed by editor Trenton Webb following a redesign in 1993. But his presence remained in the magazine in one form or another until the very final issue - whose cover he graced.

== Power Pack ==
Every month, a games tape was attached to the front of Commodore Format. Known as the "Power Pack", it featured both full games and demos of upcoming software releases. Early issues included cut-down versions of "Spiderman" and "Midnight Resistance" so that readers could road test software before they bought it. On four occasions (issues 16, 25, 27, and 37), the magazine included a second Power Pack tape with extra games or utilities. "The Graphic Adventure Creator" (CF16), "Saracen Paint" (CF25) and "Dropzone" (CF50) were notable "Power Pack" inclusions.

== Controversies ==
When the publisher of rival magazine Zzap! 64 filed for bankruptcy in 1992, Commodore Format reported that Zzap! was no more. "Let's have a moment's silence for the old sizzler," it said (a reference to Zzap! awarding highly rated games "Sizzler" status) - only for Zzap! to reappear two months later. The rivalry between the two magazines bubbled over in this manner on a few occasions, most regularly in 1992 and 1993 when some suggested Zzap was copying Commodore Format′s design (see "success" section below).

Commodore Format was one of a number of magazines which reported it had seen a running C64 version of Grandslam's "Beavers". It said the animation was "superb". It later emerged that the screenshots were faked on an Amiga in order to gain publicity for the game - which was never made.

In 1993 - after more than a year of the game's production being chronicled in the magazine - issue 38 of Commodore Format gave Mayhem In Monsterland an unprecedented 100% score in its review. It has been suggested that as the C64's popularity declined, Commodore Format used the game to keep readers interested in the magazine.

And in 1995, the last ever issue of Commodore Format featured two games on the "Power Pack" tape by Jon Wells. He claims that he did not give Future plc permission to use them, but that they did so regardless after he turned down their offer of £75 for "Escape From Arth" and "Treasure Isle".

== Success ==
The magazine was an immediate hit, soon outselling its nearest rival Zzap! 64. For a short time, Zzap! was accused of aping Commodore Format′s style - but editor Steve Jarratt said it "wasn't worth going legal. We just outsold them month after month". At its peak, in the first half of 1992, it sold over 60,000 copies a month (see circulation boxout).

== Decline ==
Commodore Format was the last commercial magazine in the UK for any of the three main 8 Bit machines (Spectrum and Amstrad being the other two). It ran until October 1995, long after commercial software for the C64 had ceased to be available in shops (unlike its sister publication Your Sinclair, which ceased publication when commercial software for the ZX Spectrum also ceased). By its final issue, it was barely recognisable from the one which had first appeared on news stands in 1990. The decline of the C64 meant the magazine was reduced to 24 pages, and it ran increasing numbers of technically oriented articles, while reviews of new games were that of those produced by Public Domain (PD) publishers, mainly due to the machine itself having a strong presence of PD publishers throughout its lifetime, which the Spectrum and Amstrad lacked.

It now retailed for £3.25. Editor Simon Forrester was the only full-time staff member of a magazine which once had a five strong team. He wrote almost every word of the last three issues, including the sign-off letter to the readers in the final issue. The letter advised readers to never buy a games console. When Forrester was writing this, the office of Official Playstation Magazine was preparing its first issue. According to message board forum posts made many years later by former writing staff, they were never made aware by Future that while they were putting together issue 60, that issue 61 would be the last.

The final cover featured Roger Frames and his dog, Debit. The Mighty Brain was slung over Roger's shoulder in a glass jar. Together, they made their way into the sunset. The image dominated the cover, along with the words "THE END".

== Online revival ==
Some of Commodore Format's former staff now write articles and answer questions on an unofficial, dedicated website. The site is edited by fans of the magazine. A number of new Power Packs have also been released.
