= Zzap!64 =

British video game magazine

- Issue 1 (May 1985)
- Editor: Chris Anderson; Roger Kean; Gary Penn; Ciarán Brennan; Julian Rignall; Gordon Houghton (issues 40-50); Stuart Wynne; Phil King; Steve Shields
- Categories: Computer magazine
- Frequency: Monthly
- Circulation: 77,483 (Jan 1987)
- First issue: May 1985
- Final issue Number: November 1992; 90
- Company: Newsfield Publications Ltd; Europress Impact
- Country: United Kingdom
- Based in: Yeovil
- Language: English
- ISSN: 0954-867X

Zzap!64 was a magazine covering video games for computers manufactured by Commodore International, especially the Commodore 64 (C64). It was published in the UK by Newsfield Publications Ltd and later by Europress Impact.

The magazine launched in April, with the cover date May 1985, as the sister magazine to CRASH. It focused on the C64 for much of its shelf life, but later incorporated Amiga game news and reviews. Like CRASH for the ZX Spectrum, it had a dedicated cult following amongst C64 owners and was well known for its irreverent sense of humour as well as its extensive, detailed coverage of the C64 scene. The magazine adopted an innovative review system that involved the use of the reviewers' faces, artistically rendered by in-house artists Oliver Frey and Mark Kendrick, to express their reaction to the games. These eventually evolved into static cartoons as the magazine began catering for a younger market. High-quality games were indicated in reviews via the "Gold Medal" award, the logo was used as a selling point for games, big and small.

By 1992, the magazine had changed so dramatically in design and editorial direction that then-publisher Europress decided to relaunch the magazine. Thus, issue 91 of Zzap!64 became issue 1 of Commodore Force, a magazine that itself lasted until March 1994.

== History ==
The first issue of Zzap!64, dated May 1985, was released on 11 April 1985. Its inaugural editorial team included editor Chris Anderson, Software Editor Bob Wade, freelance writer Steve Cooke (who joined the staff from the recently folded Personal Computer Games), and reviewers Gary Penn and Julian Rignall, who won their jobs after having placed as finalists at a video game competition. The editorial headquarters was in Yeovil, more than 120 miles from Newsfield's headquarters in Ludlow; the team was relocated to Ludlow after three months to cut costs, and Anderson and Wade left the staff after declining to make the move. Anderson would later found Future Publishing and the TED Conference.

As the Amiga gained popularity in the UK, Zzap!64 began to publish occasional reviews of Amiga games. The Amiga coverage became a fixed feature of the magazine in issue 43 (November 1988), when the title was renamed to Zzap!64 Amiga.

The magazine experienced controversy in 1989, when three out of four reviewers (Gordon Houghton, Kati Hamza and Maff Evans) were fired and replaced during production of issue 50 (June 1989). The only one remaining, Paul Rand, had been employed at Zzap!64 a mere two months. Issue 50's editorial mentioned nothing of what happened, and the issue featured content from the three fired reviewers without discussing their fates.

Issue 74 (June 1991) saw the dropping of all Amiga coverage (the word "Amiga" was dropped from the name in 1990), and the magazine became completely devoted to the C64 once more. Four months later the publisher Newsfield declared bankruptcy and publication was suspended for a month. Europress Impact (a satellite company of Europress launched by Roger Kean, Oliver Frey and Jonathan Rignall) became the new publisher of Zzap!64, beginning with issue 79 (December 1991).

Issue 90 (November 1992) was the last official Zzap!64 issue. From the following month, the magazine was replaced by Commodore Force.

=== In Italy ===
The Italian edition (just titled Zzap!), authorised by the original publisher, was not limited to Commodore 64 games, but it also reviewed games for other 8-bit machines like the ZX Spectrum, MSX, Amstrad CPC, and Atari 8-bit computers. Around 80% of the content was translated with the remainder written in Italy. From issue 1 (May 1986) to issue 73 (December 1992) it was released as an actual magazine; with issue 74 (January 1993) it became an inset of the Italian version of The Games Machine until December 1993 when it stopped being published.

From 1996 to 1999, Zzap! became an online magazine, a PC gaming website with a different "cover" each month and a mailbag, which reviewed games with the same style of the original magazine.

In 2002, a special "issue 85", dedicated to then recently released games for 8-bit machines, was released in PDF format.

In 2021, the Airons cultural association in Vigevano resumed the publication of a new Zzap! magazine, founded by a group of former editors. The magazine is published aperiodically and only sent via mail to the members; it focuses on retrogaming and new games for 8- and 16-bit systems, still made by enthusiasts and small independent software houses.

== Commemorative issues ==
In March 2002, a special "Issue 107" of Zzap!64 was published digitally in PDF format, later receiving a limited print run of 200 copies. Originally intended as a fan project based on a suggestion by journalist Cameron Davis in a Zzap!64 discussion forum, a number of ex-Newsfield writers later volunteered to join the project, including former editors Gordon Houghton, Robin Hogg and Paul Glancey.

The special issue reflected the C64's continuing popularity in the 21st century as a platform for retro gamers and hobbyists, with the majority of reviews focusing on recently released C64 games. The magazine's design was based on "classic era" Zzap!64, and the front cover was based on an illustration by former Newsfield artist Oli Frey, significantly revised by designer Craig Grannell.

Another special issue of Zzap!64 was created in July 2005 to celebrate the magazine's twentieth anniversary. Dubbed The Def Tribute to Zzap!64, it was professionally printed and given away with issue 18 of Retro Gamer magazine. Although more celebratory and retrospective in design than issue 107, it nevertheless featured a great deal of new content, including a foreword and articles by former Newsfield director and Zzap!64 editor Roger Kean and new material from former editors Gary Penn and Chris Anderson. The front cover and centerfold featured rare illustrations by Oli Frey from his pre-Newsfield days.

Fusion Retro Books licensed the rights to use the ZZAP! and Crash trademarks from Future Publishing, creating a series of Annuals funded through Kickstarter and published in time for Christmas. Roger Kean was involved in editing and compiling the issues alongside Chris Wilkins. The Annuals up to 2022 featured new and specially commissioned Oli Frey cover artwork.

Fusion Retro Books then negotiated the transfer of the remaining Newsfield trademarks for future use.

Since March 2021, a new bimonthly volume of Zzap! 64 has been available through Patreon subscriptions. This is a 64-page A5 magazine, published bi-monthly by Fusion Retro Books. Original staff member Robin Hogg is part of the reviewing team, with artist Simon Butler contributing the regular Gallery section looking at artwork. The Technical Bit In The Middle now focuses on modern hardware and other upgrades for the computer, with a regular section dedicated to the MEGA65 computer.

== Staff ==
- Chris Anderson
- Bob Wade
- Roger Kean
- Gary Penn
- Julian Rignall
- Gary Liddon
- Sean Masterson
- Steve Jarratt
- Dan Gilbert
- Paul Glancey
- Matthew "Maff" Evans
- Kati Hamza
- Robin Hogg
- Mark Caswell
- Carl Rowley
- Gordon Houghton
- Ciarán Brennan
- Richard Eddy
- Lucy Hickman
- Stuart Wynne
- "Footy" Phil King
- Steve Shields
- Dominic Handy (aka Paul Sumner)
- Warren Lapworth
- Paul Rand
- Nik Wild
- Massimo Valducci

== Columnists ==
- Jeff Minter - left early, disagreeing about the bad review of his game Mama Llama but returned to write a diary of the production of Iridis Alpha.
- Andrew Braybrook - wrote diaries on the production of his games Paradroid and Morpheus, titled Mental Procreation
- Martin Walker - following suit for his game Citadel, titled Walker's Way
- Apex Computer Productions - the Rowlands Brothers, John & Steve, doing the same for their game Creatures
