= Index of DOS games (F) =

This is an index of DOS games.

This list has been split into multiple pages. Please use the Table of Contents to browse it.

Title	Released	Developer(s)	Publisher(s)
F-117A Nighthawk Stealth Fighter 2.0	1991	MicroProse	MicroProse
F-14 Tomcat	1990	Activision	Activision
F-15 Strike Eagle	1984	MicroProse	MicroProse
F-15 Strike Eagle II	1989	MicroProse	MicroProse
F-15 Strike Eagle II: Operation Desert Storm Scenario Disk	1992	MicroProse	MicroProse
F-15 Strike Eagle III	1993	MicroProse	MicroProse
F-16 Combat Pilot	1989	Digital Integration Ltd.	Digital Integration Ltd.
F-19 Stealth Fighter	1994	MicroProse	Kixx
F-22 Lightning II	1996	NovaLogic	NovaLogic
F29 Retaliator	1989	Digital Image Design	Ocean Software
Fable	1996	Simbiosis Interactive	Telstar Electronic Studios
Face Off!	1989	Mindspan Technologies	Gamestar
Faces	1990	Sphere	Spectrum Holobyte
Fade to Black	1995	Electronic Arts	Delphine Software
Faery Tale Adventure: Book I	1989	MicroIllusions	MicroIllusions
Fahrenheit 451	1984	Byron Preiss Video Productions	Trillium Corp.
Falcon	1987	Sphere	Spectrum Holobyte
Falcon 3.0	1991	Sphere	Spectrum Holobyte
Falcon 3.0: Hornet: Naval Strike Fighter	1993	Spectrum Holobyte	Spectrum Holobyte
Falcon 3.0: MiG-29	1993	Spectrum Holobyte	Spectrum Holobyte
Falcon 3.0: Operation Fighting Tiger	1992	Spectrum Holobyte	Spectrum Holobyte
Falcon A.T.	1988	Sphere	Spectrum Holobyte
Fallout	1997	Black Isle Studios	Interplay Entertainment
Family Feud	1987	I.J.E., Softie	ShareData
Fantastic Adventures of Dizzy, The	1991	Oliver Twins	Codemasters
Fantasy Empires	1993	Strategic Simulations	Silicon Knights
Fantasy General	1996	Strategic Simulations	Mindscape
Fantasy World Dizzy	1989	Oliver Twins	Codemasters
Fascination	1991	Tomahawk	Coktel Vision
Fast Break	1988	Accolade	Accolade
Fast Food	1989	Codemasters	Codemasters
Fatal Racing	1995	Gremlin Interactive	Gremlin Interactive
Fatty Bear's Birthday Surprise	1993	Humongous Entertainment	Humongous Entertainment
Fatty Bear's FunPack	1993	Humongous Entertainment	Humongous Entertainment
Fellowship of the Ring, The	1986	Beam Software	Addison-Wesley
FernGully Computerized Coloring Book, The	1992	Capstone Software	IntraCorp
Fernando Martín Basket Master	1990	Dinamic Software	Dinamic Software
Ferrari Formula One	1989	Imagitec Design	Electronic Arts
Feud	1988	Binary Design	Mastertronic
F.Godmom	1991	Soggybread Software	Soggybread Software
Fields of Glory	1993	Microprose	Microprose
Fiendish Freddy's Big Top O'Fun	1989	Gray Matter	Mindscape
FIFA International Soccer	1994	EA Canada	Electronic Arts
FIFA Soccer 96	1995	Extended Play Productions	Electronic Arts
FIFA Soccer 97	1996	EA Canada	Electronic Arts
Fighter Duel	1995	Jaeger Software	Philips Interactive Media
Fighter Wing	1995	Gemsoft Corp.	Merit Studios
Final Assault	1988	Infogrames	Infogrames
The Final Battle	1991	Silicon Software	Personal Software Services
Final Conflict, The	1991	Plato	Impressions Games
Final Crusade of Kroz, The	1990	Scott Miller	Apogee Software
Final Doom	1996	id Software, TeamTNT, Casali brothers	GT Interactive
Fire-Brigade: The Battle for Kiev - 1943	1988	Panther Games	Panther Games
Fire Hawk: Thexder The Second Contact	1990	Game Arts	Sierra On-Line
Fire & Ice	1992	Graftgold	Renegade Software
Fire King	1990	Strategic Studies Group	Micro Forte
Fire Power	1988	Silent Software	MicroIllusions
First Expedition	1987	Interstel Corporation	Interstel Corporation
First Mile, The	2005	Malinche Entertainment	Malinche Entertainment
First Samurai, The	1992	Vivid Image	Ubisoft
Fish!	1988	Magnetic Scrolls	Rainbird Software
Flames of Freedom	1991	Maelstrom Games	MicroProse
Flashback: The Quest for Identity	1993	Delphine Software	U.S. Gold
Flash Traffic: City of Angels	1994	Tsunami Games	Tsunami Games
Fleet Defender	1994	Microprose	Microprose
Fleet Defender Gold	1995	Microprose	Microprose
Fleet Street Phantom, The	1995	Sherston Software	Sherston Software
Flight Assignment: Airline Transport Pilot	1990	Sublogic	Sublogic
Flight of the Amazon Queen	1995	Interactive Binary Illusions	Renegade Software
Flight of the Intruder	1990	Rowan Software	Spectrum Holobyte
Flight Unlimited	1995	Looking Glass Technologies	Softgold Computerspiele
FlixMix	1993	Celeris	Celeris
Floor 13	1992	David J Eastman	Virgin Interactive
Flying Corps	1996	Rowan Software	Empire Interactive
Flying Corps Gold	1997	Rowan Software	Empire Interactive
Fooblitzky	1985	Infocom	Infocom
Fool's Errand, The	1987	Cliff Johnson	Miles Computing
Football	1986	Sublogic	Sublogic
Football Glory	1995	Croteam	Black Legend
Football Manager	1987	Addictive Games	Addictive Games
Football Manager 2	1988	Addictive Games	Addictive Games
Football Manager World Cup Edition	1990	Addictive Games	Addictive Games
Football Manager 3	1992	Addictive Games	Addictive Games
Ford Simulator II	1990	The SoftAd Group	Ford Motor Company
Ford Simulator, The	1987	Beck-Tech, The SoftAd Group	Ford Motor Company
Forgotten Realms Archives, The	1997	Strategic Simulations	Interplay Entertainment
Forgotten Worlds	1991	Arc Developments	U.S. Gold
Fortress of Dr. Radiaki, The	1994	Future Vision, Maelstrom Software	Merit Studios
Fountain of Dreams	1990	Electronic Arts	Electronic Arts
Fragile Allegiance	1996	Gremlin Interactive, Cajji Software	Gremlin Interactive
Framed	1995	Machination	Machination
Frank Bruno's Boxing	1985	Elite Systems	Elite Systems
Franko: The Crazy Revenge	1996	World Software	Mirage Software
Frank Thomas Big Hurt Baseball	1995	Iguana Entertainment	Acclaim Entertainment
Freakin' Funky Fuzzballs	1990	Sir-Tech	Sir-Tech
Freddy Pharkas: Frontier Pharmacist	1993	Al Lowe, Josh Mandel	Sierra On-Line
Freddy's Rescue Roundup	1984	IBM	IBM
Frederik Pohl's Gateway	1992	Legend Entertainment	Legend Entertainment
Fritz 1.0	1991	Frans Morsch, Mathias Feist	Chessbase
Frogger	1983	Olaf Lubeck	Sierra On-Line
Frogger II: Three Deep	1984	Sega	Sega
Frontier: Elite II	1993	GameTek	GameTek, Konami
Frontier: First Encounters	1995	Frontier Developments	GameTek, Konami
Front Lines	1994	Impressions Games	Impressions Games
Front Page Sports: Football	1992	Dynamix	Sierra On-Line
Full Count Baseball	1984	Lance Haffner Games	Lance Haffner Games
Full Throttle	1995	LucasArts	LucasArts
Full Wormage, The	1998	Team17	Hasbro Interactive
Fun School 2	1989	Database Educational Software	Database Educational Software
Fun School 3	1991	Database Educational Software	Database Educational Software
Fun School 4	1992	Europress Software	Europress Software
Fun School: Spelling	1995	Europress Software	Europress Software
Fury of the Furries	1993	Kalisto Entertainment	Kalisto Entertainment
Future Wars	1989	Delphine Software	Delphine Software
FX Fighter	1995	Argonaut Software	GTE Entertainment, Philips Interactive Media
