= Boffin (disambiguation) =

Boffin was originally a British slang term for a scientists and other technical people who were recognized as particularly innovative and effective, but more recently is being applied to people who resemble the popular stereotypes of asocial scientists. It may also refer to:

- Boffins, an Australian children's television series.
- Boffin (computer game), computer platform game for the Acorn Electron and BBC Micro systems
- Boffin, nickname given by the Royal Navy during World War II to the Mark V mountings for the Oerlikon 20 mm cannon up-gunned with the Bofors 40 mm gun
- Boffin, variant spelling of the Welsh family name Baughan

People:

- Danny Boffin, Belgian former football player
- Ruud Boffin, Belgian former goalkeeper
- Henri M. J. Boffin, Belgian astronomer
