= Football Manager 2 =

1988 video game

- C64 cover art
- Developer: Addictive Games
- Publisher: Addictive Games
- Designer: Kevin Toms
- Series: Football Manager
- Platforms: Commodore 64, ZX Spectrum, Amstrad CPC, Amiga, Atari ST, MS-DOS
- Release: 17 June 1988
- Genre: Sports
- Mode: Single-player

Football Manager 2 is a 1988 hybrid sports business simulation video game developed and published by Addictive Games. It is the second game in the Football Manager series, initially released on 17 June 1988. It is also one of the 48 games included in The Spectrum, which was released in November 2024.

== Gameplay ==
Commodore 64 screenshot

Gameplay is very similar to the first game, with mostly text based screens, although they are more colorful than the original and usually contain at least basic graphical elements. Input is mostly by moving a cursor (using either joystick or mouse depending on system) rather than entering numbers. The game again starts the player, whichever team is chosen, in division four with a random allocation of players and the player must attempt to gain promotion to division one but now, as well as the FA Cup, the player can also compete in the League Cup to eventually attempt to win the treble.

Added features include team sponsorship, a training screen which allows the choice of long or short passing tactics, and the ability to place your players in positions on the pitch. This is done by moving boxes representing your players on a graphical screen while comparing individual opponent players' skills (like the first game, the opposing players are not named). This means opposing strikers can be man marked. Another main difference to the first game is the graphical highlights, now on all versions, that feature the full length of the pitch over three screens rather than just the goal attempts. At half time, substitutions and formation changes can be made.

== Development and release ==
Following the sale of Addictive Games to Prism Leisure Corporation in 1987, Kevin Toms concentrated on creating a second Football Manager game. Unlike the original BASIC only game, the sequel required machine code, which meant working with a number of developers for various systems. For the ZX Spectrum version, this was Bedrock Software. Unlike the first game that was stagger-released over a period of five years, Football Manager 2 was launched on all formats at the same time in June 1988, although it was available on a much smaller range of systems, including Commodore 64, ZX Spectrum, Amstrad CPC, Amiga, Atari ST, and PC. Unlike the first game, there was no customiser utility with the original release. In 1989, Football Manager 2 Expansion Kit was released as a stand alone release, and also as a packed in with Football Manager 2. As well as being able to rename teams and players, this offered the chance to start in division one or play in other leagues such as the Euro Super League or as a national team in a World Championship.

== Reception ==
Critical reception was generally positive, although there were mixed reviews. In a highly positive review, based mainly on the Atari ST version, Julian Rignall in C&VG said the game was "simply a football fan's dream come true ... a beautifully structured and presented game and is engrossing, challenging and very, very addictive", awarding a score of 9/10. Sinclair User were similarly impressed, giving a score of 94% concluding that it is "an improvement on a legendary game. It still looks tatty but plays brilliantly." In contrast, Tony Dillon in a review for Commodore User gave the game only 2/10, labelling the game "a very big letdown" with "little or no improvement over the original". Additionally, he said the mouse control on the Amiga version was "appallingly bad", a criticism also levelled in the positive C&VG review).

John S. Davison for Page 6 said: "I'm no football fan, but I actually enjoyed this game despite its failings. As with all good simulations I soon found myself totally absorbed by it, and the desire to play just one more match was very strong. If it does this to me, then football enthusiasts should love it." Zzap! said: "There is sufficient depth, particularly in the training section, for your managerial skills to be honed, and varied, so lasting interest is quite high. Decision-makers, this game is for you." Crash said: "Real football fans everywhere will love it; it may not have mass appeal, but it's a leader in its field."

Andrew Baines for The Australian Commodore and Amiga Review said: "The whole new look and feel of Football Manager 2 gives the impression of a true winner, and definitely something you grow to enjoy more and more. This one receives the top spot out of all the others as a game that is essential for everyone, as it is a true classic." Football Manager 2 entered the Gallup game chart at number one, with the ZX Spectrum version becoming the best selling game on any format in the country.
