= Software Star =

1985 video game

- Developer: Addictive Games
- Publisher: Addictive Games
- Designer: Kevin Toms
- Platforms: Amstrad CPC, Commodore 64, ZX Spectrum
- Release: EU: 1985
- Genre: Business simulation
- Mode: Single-player

Software Star is a 1985 business simulation video game designed by Kevin Toms and released by Addictive Games for the Amstrad CPC, Commodore 64 and ZX Spectrum.

== Gameplay ==
This is essentially a text-based management game. The player's task is to manage a software house, create new games, manage publicity and make a profit of £10000. Meanwhile, the player must achieve the status of "Software Star" for ten successive months.

Having a large portfolio of games has its advantages by increasing the player's monthly sales. However, money must be spent on promoting aging titles. Each game has its own quality rating, where the quality increases with the amount of time spent on development. Managing the productivity of the player's staff is also key to the game. The player can view a snapshot of productivity over the last six months and decide to discipline, offer incentives, or take no action. There are four sales regions where the player's products are sold. These regions are ordered from one to four, depending on how much importance they are given based on consulting the sales from the previous month. Public relations is adjusted by choosing Honesty or Hype. Each decision has an effect on the company's image. Finally, the player will have to evaluate the potential market depending on the time of year and decide how many advertising pages to buy. Markets are larger around Christmas and New Year. It is then time to look at the sales figures as the player's game enters the Top 20. The player is then given a sales break-even figure and each game climbs the chart if it sells well to the Number One spot.

At the end of the month, the player views a monthly statement showing progress and Stardom rating ranging from Nobody to Software Star. At the end of the year, the directors will check the player's progress. They will fire the player, raise the bar, or give the player another chance.

== See also ==
- Millionaire

== Reception ==
Zzap!64 thought the game was a disappointing follow-up to Football Manager, with too little to do for the player and less feeling of control. It received a rating of 43%.
