= Time Riders in American History =

1992 video game

- Developer: The Learning Company
- Publisher: The Learning Company
- Platform: MS-DOS
- Release: 1992
- Genre: Educational

Time Riders in American History is a history-themed, educational video game developed and published by The Learning Company. It was released in 1992 for MS-DOS.

== Plot ==
The game's plot revolves around the notorious Dr. Thanatopsis Dread, who is trying to take over the world. To lend credibility to his bid for world domination, Dread manipulated historical records to make it seem like his ancestors were responsible for major accomplishments in American history from 1492 to 1905. Players must travel through time to correct these historical inaccuracies and ensure that the true American history is preserved and Dread is defeated.

== Reception ==
Compute! wrote that the title is a "one well-rounded text adventure". The New York Times felt it was "riding the current historical-games wave". Deseret deemed it similar in concept to Davidson's Headline Harry and the Great Paper Race.

PCGames nominated Time Riders in American History for its award for the best children's game of 1992.

== Other sources ==
- "Gadsden Times – Google News Archive Search".
- "Herald-Journal – Google News Archive Search".
- "Sarasota Herald-Tribune – Google News Archive Search".
- "Sarasota Herald-Tribune – Google News Archive Search".
- PC Mag. Ziff Davis, Inc. March 25, 1997. p. 562. ISSN 0888-8507.
- PC Mag. Ziff Davis, Inc. June 11, 1991. pp. 1–532. ISSN 0888-8507.
- PC Magazine: The Independent Guide to IBM-standard Personal Computing. Vol. 11. PC Communications Corporation. 1992. ISSN 0888-8507.
- Studies, C.C.S. (1993). Social Studies Review. California Council for the Social Studies. ISSN 1056-6325.
- Scholastic Inc (1996). Literacy Place: America's journal. Scholastic Incorporated. ISBN 9780590906685.
- Leonhard, W.; Simon, B. (1994). PC Mom: The Mother of All PC Books, Wherein Mom's Mordant Minions Muck in the Multimedia Madness. Addison-Wesley. ISBN 9780201406818.
