= Mission Control (video game) =

2001 video game

Mission Control V2
- Mission Control V2 box art
- Developer: Sherston Software
- Publisher: Sherston Software
- Series: The Crystal Rainforest
- Platforms: Acorn Archimedes, Windows, classic Mac OS
- Release: V2: PAL: June 2001
- Genre: platformer
- Mode: Single-player

Mission Control is an educational platform game developed and published by Sherston Software for use in primary schools.

== Plot ==
As with its predecessor, the game takes place on the planet Oglo. The last remaining rainforest is threatened by dangerous chemicals produced by the antagonist scientist "Gomez", aided by his robots. Through a variety of settings and activities, the player-character must save the planet and the local tribes from the planet's deforestation.

== Gameplay ==
A screenshot showing the first level of the game and the general interface. The player must repair the drinks machine

The game is presented in a first-person perspective, in which the player has to use various controls and mechanisms to explore the dense rainforests and solve puzzles. The game contains nine fully narrated interactive activities which include machinery, puzzles, computer programmes and control mechanisms. The player-character takes part in various scenarios including "Lifting the Heavy Box" in which the player has to use the lifting machine to load boxes into the back of a 'hoverheli', the "South Temple Maze" which involves a machine named Rover, who needs to be programmed so that it can find its way through the South Temple Maze. A control panel enables the player to give commands to Rover. "The Chemical Store" ensures the player that the poison trucks are moved safely to the recycling tank without polluting the river. "Switch the Robots Off" involves a set of coloured lights which has to be programmed in order to deactivate the robots. The final task "Building the Bridge" involves controlling Gomez's machine to build a bridge safely to the island. The player must use logic in order to work out how to build the bridge by dropping stones one-by-one onto the supports.
