= Grand Prix Manager (1984 video game) =

- Loading screen
- Publisher(s): Silicon Joy
- Writer(s): P. Boulton
- Platform(s): ZX Spectrum
- Release: EU: 1984
- Genre(s): Management simulation
- Mode(s): Single-player

Grand Prix Manager is a Formula 1 management simulation video game released for the ZX Spectrum in 1984. It was written by P. Boulton and published by Silicon Joy.

== Gameplay ==
Screenshot showing sponsorship negotiations

Grand Prix Manager places the player in the role of the manager of a Formula 1 racing team, with the ultimate goal being to reach to highest management rating. This can only be achieved by winning the championship on the hardest difficulty setting.

The player can choose how many races to take part in over the course of a season, and after each race the player is presented with a race performance screen, followed by car upgrade options. Revenue is generated through sponsorship, however sponsors will base their investment on their satisfaction with previous race results. This income is used to hire mechanics and a driver from a set list of well-known Formula 1 drivers.

The player makes choices from menu screens regarding aspects of the car such as the tires, depth of tire tread and angle of the rear wing, and is then shown highlights of the race.

== Reception ==
Chris Bourne of Sinclair User found the game to be unimpressive, especially as it was from the same publisher as Football Manager. He found the in-race graphics to be motionless. He scored the game 1/10. Sean Cox of Big K was more positive towards the game, giving it a "KK" rating (maximum is "KKK"), and saying that people who enjoyed Football Manager would enjoy this game as well.
