= Andy Hollis =

American video game designer

- Occupations: Video game designer, programmer, producer
- Years active: 1983–1999
- Employer(s): MicroProse; Electronic Arts
- Known for: Flight simulators

Andy Hollis is an American video game designer, programmer and producer, mainly known for his flight simulators. He was one of the founding members of MicroProse.

== Video game development ==
He began his career at MicroProse Software, where he was responsible for games such as Kennedy Approach, Gunship, F-15 Strike Eagle II, F-19 Stealth Fighter and F-15 Strike Eagle III, as well as science fiction titles Lightspeed and Hyperspeed.

In 1993, Hollis joined Origin Systems, where he was responsible for creating games for Electronic Arts' Jane's Combat Simulations brand. Among the simulations created at Origin are AH-64D Longbow, Longbow 2 and Jane's F-15. In 1996, GameSpot named him as the number five in their listing of the Most Influential People in Computer Gaming, "honored for helping to bring back serious flight simulations that don't alienate beginners."

When Origin changed its focus to online games, he moved around within Electronic Arts and was working on NASCAR games and a Harry Potter online game.

He returned to Origin in 2003 after two years of retirement, where he oversaw the development of Ultima X, which was cancelled before release in 2004. Later, he served as president of Fastlane Games, Inc., working on the development of a massively multiplayer online game for NCsoft before retiring again in 2006.

=== Games ===
Name	Year	Credited with	Publisher
MiG Alley Ace	1983	designer	MicroProse
Solo Flight (Apple II port)	1983	designer	MicroProse
Kennedy Approach	1985	designer	MicroProse
Gunship	1986	director, designer, programmer	MicroProse
Sid Meier's Pirates!	1987	artist	MicroProse
F-19 Stealth Fighter	1988	programmer	MicroProse
F-15 Strike Eagle II	1989	designer, programmer	MicroProse
Lightspeed	1990	designer, programmer	MicroProse
Hyperspeed	1991	designer, programmer	MicroProse
F-117A Nighthawk Stealth Fighter 2.0	1991	programmer	MicroProse
F-15 Strike Eagle III	1992	producer, designer, programmer	MicroProse
Jane's AH-64D Longbow	1996	producer	Electronic Arts
Jane's AH-64D Longbow – Flash Point: Korea	1996	producer	Electronic Arts
Jane's Longbow 2	1997	executive producer	Electronic Arts
Jane's F-15	1998	executive producer	Electronic Arts
Fighter Pilot	1998	executive producer	Electronic Arts
Sid Meier's Alpha Centauri	1999	executive producer	Electronic Arts

== Motorsports ==
Hollis has won a total of thirteen SCCA Solo national championships, and is an instructor for the Evolution Performance Driving School. He served on the Solo Events Board (SEB) and its various advisory committees for 20 years, and is a very active member of the SCCA's Solo program. In 2006, his seven straight class wins and two Super Challenge victories lead to the Overall Championship in SCCA ProSolo. In 2010, he repeated as Overall champ and added a Solo national championship in the STX class. 2011 brought another Solo championship, this time in STC. 2012 was another undefeated season in a new car and class (STF Mazda 2), with six straight Pro Solo class wins, a third Overall title and a fourth Solo championship. Notably, Hollis has won the Pro Solo Super Challenge 14 times, 13 of which have been in the last ten years. In 2014, he added an SMF class championship to his tally.

Continuing through 2014, Hollis has been a participant in the One Lap of America, finishing in the overall top ten for five years running. This, despite competing in a car from the slowest class. An avid track day enthusiast in the One Lap CRX, he instructs at a variety of road courses in Texas.

Beginning in 2017, Hollis served as crew chief for American Honda's associates race team in 24-hour+ events, with multiple class wins and overall podium finishes.
