= Kevin Toms =

British video game designer (born 1957)

- Born: 22 April 1957 (age 68); Paignton, United Kingdom
- Occupation: Video game designer
- Known for: Football Manager; Addictive Games

Kevin Toms (born 22 April 1957 in Paignton) is a British video game designer who founded Addictive Games and created the original Football Manager, a simulation game released in the early 1980s. It included a portrait of his bearded face on publicity material and cassette covers.

== Life and career ==
Toms worked as a professional computer programmer for large companies in the late 1970s and early 1980s. He developed games in his spare time, taking over a year to create the original versions of his Football Manager game for the TRS-80 and ZX81. Toms began selling these versions by mail order in 1982 through advertisements placed in computer magazines using the name Addictive Games. The game became a big success, particularly after being ported to the ZX Spectrum, and began to be stocked by high street stores. When the stores ordered thousands of copies, Toms quit his day job to run Addictive Games. Football Manager was ported to a wide variety of systems (there were sixteen different versions by 1987). Between 1982 and 1987, Toms ran the company which published a number of games by other programmers as well as new games from Toms, Software Star and President. Toms then sold Addictive to Prism Leisure Corporation, although he still created two more versions of Football Manager for them; Football Manager 2 and Football Manager World Cup Edition.

Toms returned to corporate work and moved to New Zealand to work as a software architect for large companies. By 2018, he had relocated to Canada. Toms currently resides in the Netherlands.

Circa 2003, Toms created an online football management game called New Zealand Football Championship Manager based on New Zealand's national league and as of 2010 was working on a new football manager style game for the iPhone. In August 2015, Toms began rewriting the original 1982 Football Manager game for mobile devices after pitching the idea to his followers, drawing on his work experience of business app development. The new game, Football Star* Manager (KTFSM), was released in 2016 to an overwhelmingly positive response from buyers – many of them former players of the original Football Manager series. KTFSM was first released on iOS and Android; since its release, the game has been ported to macOS, Windows 10 and Amazon Fire. The game is as near to the original Football Manager as you can get on the new platforms.

In January 2022, Kevin launched a Kickstarter to fund a new version of his Football Manager game, Football New Manager, to mark the 40th anniversary of the original game It was renamed Kevin Toms Football Game and released in 2023. Kevin Toms Football Star Manager was ported to Steam in August 2025.

== Releases ==
- Football Manager (1982)
- Software Star (1985)
- President (1987)
- Football Manager 2 (1988)
- Football Manager: World Cup Edition (1990)
- New Zealand Football Championship Manager (2003)
- Kevin Toms Football Star Manager (2016) - a reimagining of the original game for mobiles, PC and Mac
- Kevin Toms World Football Cup (2018) - a World Cup version for mobiles, which is no longer available
- Kevin Toms Football Game (2023) - a new free-to-play mobile game
