= HotShot (video game) =

1988 video game

- Developer: Maxwell Technology
- Publishers: Addictive Games; Prism Leisure
- Platforms: Amiga, Amstrad CPC, Atari ST, Commodore 64, MS-DOS, ZX Spectrum
- Release: 1988
- Genre: Breakout clone
- Modes: Single-player, multiplayer

HotShot is a Breakout style video game published in 1988 for Amiga, Amstrad CPC, Atari ST, Commodore 64, and ZX Spectrum, as well as MS-DOS compatible operating systems.

== Gameplay ==
Two competitors play with a ball, in an arena which is split into two halves with breakable blocks on both sides. The aim is to get a higher score than your opponent by breaking more blocks on your side than your opponent does. Competitors are in the form of humanoids, robots and aliens, all of which have a 'gun' of some sort enabling them to take control of the ball. The range of arenas have several pinball-style flippers which make the ball bounce off at unpredictable angles. The game can be played as one player versus a computer player (controlled with good AI for its time), or as two players competing against one another. Players can suck the ball into their gun then fire it at their blocks for points, or deliberately shoot the ball into their opponent to make them lose points. When hit, players disintegrate but instantly respawn with control of the ball going to the opponent.

There are six characters to choose from: Maxx, a humanoid armed with a magnetic gun to control the ball; Wobbly, an alien blob of slime with eyes on stalks who sucks in and fires the ball with his elephant-like trunk; Triffid, a tripedal robot with a magnet gun built into his head; Killer, a bipedal robot with a magnet gun for a head; Tojoi, a humanoid holding a magnet gun in a spacesuit with large 80s shoulder pads; Yuri, physically identical to Maxx but with different abilities.

== Reception ==
Sinclair User gave the game a 91%, complimenting the gameplay and replayability. Crash's score was 77% and found the game addictive, but criticised the awkward controls and unrealistic bouncing of the ball. Justifying Your Sinclair's 8 out of 10, the reviewer enjoyed the playability of the game while also saying that "frustration really sets in after a long session".
