= F-15 Strike Eagle II =

1989 video game

- Developer: MPS Labs
- Publisher: MicroProse
- Designers: Andy Hollis; Sid Meier
- Composer: Matt Furniss
- Platforms: Amiga, Atari ST, MS-DOS, PC-98, X68000, Genesis
- Release: 1989: MS-DOS, PC-98; 1991: Amiga, ST, X68000; December 1993: Genesis
- Genre: Combat flight simulation
- Mode: Single-player

F-15 Strike Eagle II is an F-15E Strike Eagle combat flight simulator released in 1989 by MicroProse and is the sequel of F-15 Strike Eagle. It was followed in 1992 by F-15 Strike Eagle III, the final game of the series.

The fighter is equipped with a M61 Vulcan and three different kinds of missiles, Sidewinders, AMRAAMs and Mavericks. F-15 Strike Eagle II comes with four scenarios: Libya, Persian Gulf, Vietnam and Middle East. In a mission the player has to fight a variety of enemy aircraft, missile boats, satellite stations and other ground targets, to take out one primary and one secondary target, making sure to not attack friendly targets. Promotions and medals are based on the mission score.

Strike Eagle II was very similar in both appearance and game play to MicroProse's previous release, F-19 Stealth Fighter. Like many flight simulators of the time, realism was at times sacrificed due to either computing requirements or playability.

In 1991, a scenario disk was released called F-15 II Operation Desert Storm. It added three new scenarios, two from the earlier F-19 Stealth Fighter, North Cape and Central Europe, and a new scenario based on the contemporary Gulf War called Desert Storm. In addition, night missions, improved sound support and new weapons were included.

== Reception ==
The game was reviewed positively in Computer Gaming World. The review described it as "a gamer's game", emphasizing the game aspects over the simulation, and notably less complicated than F-19 Stealth Fighter. 1992 and 1994 surveys in the magazine of wargames with modern settings gave the game three and a half stars out of five.
