= Millionaire (video game) =

1984 video game

- BBC Micro cover art
- Publisher: Incentive Software
- Designer: John Hunt
- Platforms: ZX Spectrum, Acorn Electron, BBC Micro
- Release: EU: 1984
- Genre: Business simulation
- Mode: Single-player

Millionaire is a business simulation game originally written for the ZX Spectrum by John Hunt and ported to the Acorn Electron and BBC Micro. The objective is to become a software millionaire and avoid bankruptcy.

== Gameplay ==
Millionaire is a text-based management game in which the player takes the role of a home-based games programmer who has written a program and must market it to the retailers. Starting with an investment of £500, the player uses this money to pay advertisers and cover tape duplication costs. Meanwhile, new games must be written and promoted while keeping costs down. The style of game that could be programmed included arcade, adventure, and strategy.

The player then has to allocate 20 management points to spread amongst programming, presentation, original ideas, and maintaining player interest.

A character called Honest Harry who can offer deals such as cheap cassettes, which will lessen distribution costs, or programs. Sometimes, these deals are not so good as the programs could be bugged or stolen, having negative effect.

Progress in the game is monitored by observing the sales figures at the end of each month. If the player makes enough money the a screenshot of a bigger and better house/office is displayed. Chance plays a role; certain events will affect sales positively or negatively.

== Reception ==
Reception

Review score
Publication	Score
Crash	80%

A review in Crash praised the games graphics. In Your Spectrum's "Joystick Jury" feature, two of the three reviews thought the game would be a Hit.

== See also ==
- Software Star
