= MiG Alley Ace =

1983 video game

- Developer(s): MicroProse
- Publisher(s): NA: MicroProse; EU: U.S. Gold
- Designer(s): Andy Hollis
- Platform(s): Atari 8-bit, Commodore 64
- Release: 1983: Atari; 1984: C64
- Genre(s): Combat flight simulation game

MiG Alley Ace (shown as Mig Alley ACE on the Commodore title screen) is a combat flight simulation game published by MicroProse for Atari 8-bit computers in 1983. A Commodore 64 port followed in 1984.

== Gameplay ==
Split screen gameplay screenshot (Atari 8-bit)

MiG Alley Ace is a head-to-head combat flight simulator designed by Andy Hollis. It is based on the combat in MiG Alley.

== Reception ==
David Patton reviewed the game for Computer Gaming World, and stated that "While this game lacks too many features to be called a true flight simulator (it has no attitude indicator, no "weather problems", no runways, no player control over ailerons and rudders, etc. . .), the excellent aerial dogfight action and Korean war setting make it worthy purchase for both the war gamer who is looking for a good arcade experience and for the arcader who is ready to go to war." InfoWorld's Essential Guide to Atari Computers recommended the game as an excellent flight simulation for the Atari 8-bit, citing the split screen as an improvement over Hellcat Ace.

In 1996, Computer Gaming World declared MiG Alley Ace the 129th-best computer game ever released.
