= F-19 =

Fictional fighter aircraft

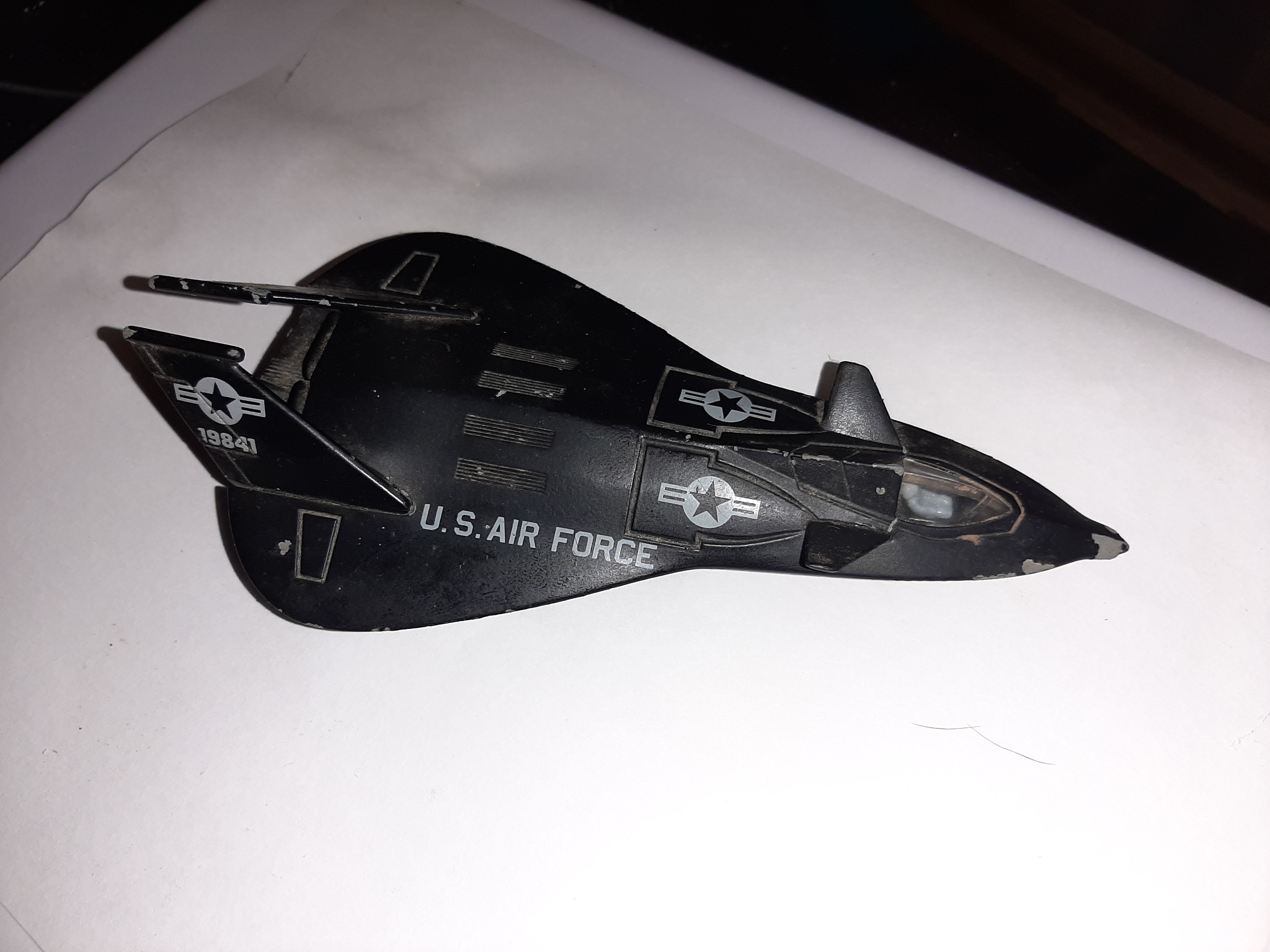
A fictitious F-19 design as a scale model

F-19 is a skipped DoD designation in the Tri-Service fighter aircraft designation sequence which was thought by many popular media outlets to have been allocated to the Lockheed F-117 Nighthawk. The designation was actually skipped at Northrop's request, to avoid confusion with the MiG-19.

== History ==
Since the unification of the numbering system in 1962, U.S. fighters have been designated by consecutive numbers, beginning with the F-1 Fury. F-13 was never assigned to a fighter due to triskaidekaphobia, though the designation had previously been used for a reconnaissance version of the B-29. After the F/A-18 Hornet, the next announced aircraft was the F-20 Tigershark. The USAF proposed the F-19 designation for the fighter, but Northrop requested "F-20" instead. The USAF finally approved the F-20 designation in 1982. The truth behind this jump in numbers is that Northrop pressed the designation "F-20" as they wanted an even number, to stand out from the Soviet odd-numbered designations.

The United States received the first Lockheed F-117 Nighthawk stealth attack aircraft in 1982. During the decade many news articles discussed what they called the "F-19". The Testor Corporation produced an F-19 scale model. The company had decades of experience in producing highly detailed models that pilots and aerospace engineers purchased, and used its sources in the United States military and defense contractors. The CBS Evening News with Dan Rather and other media discussed the model after its January 1986 introduction. When the real stealth aircraft crashed in California in July 1986, news stories used the model to depict it. Representative Ron Wyden asked the chairman of Lockheed Corporation why an aircraft that Congressmen could not see was sold as model aircraft. The publicity helped to make the model the best-selling model aircraft of all time, but the model's smooth contours bore little resemblance to the F-117 and its angular panels. The F-117 designation was publicly revealed with the actual aircraft in November 1988.

The Alabama Air National Guard's 117th Intelligence Squadron features a fictional F-19A Specter design on their squadron logo, inspired by the fictitious design popularized by the Testor toy.

== Notable appearances in media ==
- In 1986, the Testor Corporation released a model aircraft kit, calling it the "F-19 Stealth Fighter". The kit is claimed to be the best-selling plastic model kit of all time.
- Like the Testor Corporation, Monogram models also released the "F-19A Specter" which was based on the design by Loral Inc.
- In his 1986 novel Red Storm Rising, Tom Clancy featured the "F-19A Ghostrider" (nicknamed "Frisbee" by the pilots and crew) as a secret weapon used to combat a Soviet invasion of Germany.
- MicroProse released the 1987 video game Project Stealth Fighter and the successor 1988/1990 game F-19 Stealth Fighter, both featuring an imagining of the F-19's capabilities, with artwork based on the Testor Corporation model kit.
- The Alabama Air National Guard’s 117th Intelligence Squadron uses the F-19A Specter on their squadron logo.

== See also ==
Related lists

- 1962 United States Tri-Service aircraft designation system
- List of fighter aircraft
- List of military aircraft of the United States
