= President (video game) =

1987 video game

- Developer: Addictive Games
- Publisher: Addictive Games
- Designer: Kevin Toms
- Platforms: Amstrad CPC, Commodore 64, ZX Spectrum
- Release: EU: 1987
- Genre: Strategy
- Mode: Single-player

President is a 1987 game released by Kevin Toms for the Amstrad CPC, Commodore 64 and ZX Spectrum.

== Gameplay ==
Following on from Toms' Football Manager and Software Star games, President is a game where the player takes control of a small country, and decides whether to be a dictator, or a hero. The player has to balance the wants and needs of their virtual citizens, while also balancing the books and trying to build up an army and search for oil.

== Reception ==
Your Sinclair gave the game a positive review, awarding it 7/10. Similarly, Sinclair User gave the game 4/5. However, Crash were less favourable, only awarding it 29%.

== See also ==
- President Elect
