= Project Stealth Fighter =

1987 video game

- Developer: MicroProse
- Publisher: MicroProse
- Designers: Jim Synoski; Arnold Hendrick
- Programmers: Jim Synoski; Dan Chang; Gregg Tavares
- Artists: Michael Haire; Michele Mahan
- Composer: Ken Lagace
- Platforms: Commodore 64; ZX Spectrum
- Release: 1987 (C64); 1989 (Spectrum)
- Genre: Combat flight simulator
- Mode: Single-player

Project Stealth Fighter is a combat flight simulator released for the Commodore 64 in 1987 by MicroProse, featuring a fictional United States military aircraft. During the time of the game's release, there was heavy speculation surrounding a missing aircraft in the United States Air Force's numbering system, the F-19. Project Stealth Fighter was later renamed F-19 Stealth Fighter and was remade in 1988 for the 16-bit systems with much improved graphics.

== Gameplay ==
Takeoff before a night mission (C64)

In the game, the player take on the role of a fictional fighter pilot flying missions of varying difficulty over four geographic locations: Libya, the Persian Gulf, the North Cape, and Central Europe.

== Reception ==
Reception

Awards
Publication	Award
Your Sinclair	Megagame
Zzap!64	Gold Medal

The game was critically acclaimed. Computer Gaming World in 1987 stated that Project Stealth Fighter pushed the limits of 8-bit hardware (noting the resulting great difficulty in landing at airfields) but concluded favorably: "Timely? It couldn't be more so. Realistic? Yes ... Challenging? Definitely!" In a 1994 survey of wargames the magazine gave the title two stars out of five, stating that F-19 and F-117 had superseded it. Compute! in 1988 called the game "a superlative flight simulator". It praised the graphics, stating that they improved on those of the company's F-15 Strike Eagle. The magazine concluded: "If you're to have only one flight simulator in your library, let it be this one ... Project: Stealth Fighter is Microprose's best". The Commodore 64 version's review in Zzap!64 said that the "Project Stealth Fighter is excellent, and sets new standards to which other must now aspire". ACE stated the game as certainly enjoyable and the rating for C64 version is 863 out of 1000.

Project: Stealth Fighter was awarded the Origins Award for "Best Military or Strategy Computer Game of 1987".

The game was nominated for the Golden Joystick Awards '88 in the category "Best Simulation - 8 Bit".

A port to the ZX Spectrum version was first advertised in 1988 prior to the game being renamed for the 16-bit releases. By the time it was published late 1989, it used the F-19 Stealth Fighter title in-game but was still packaged as Project Stealth Fighter. A review in Your Sinclair called it "the best Speccy flight sim to date".

Both the Spectrum and Commodore 64 versions were subsequently reissued as F-19 Stealth Fighter in the same packaging as the 16-bit versions.

In late 1990, the combined sales of F-19 Stealth Fighter across four platforms took the game into the UK Top 20 All Format games chart.
