= Kennedy Approach =

1985 video game

- Cover art
- Developer(s): MicroProse
- Publisher(s): MicroProse
- Designer(s): Andy Hollis
- Platform(s): Amiga, Atari 8-bit, Atari ST, Commodore 64
- Release: 1985: Atari 8-bit, C64; 1988: Amiga, Atari ST
- Genre(s): Simulator
- Mode(s): Single-player

Kennedy Approach is an air traffic control simulation computer game released by MicroProse for the Atari 8-bit computers and Commodore 64 in 1985. It was designed by Andy Hollis. Ports for the Amiga and Atari ST were published in 1988.

== Gameplay ==
A thunderstorm roams

The player assumes the role of a controller in a Terminal Radar Approach Control, giving instructions to aircraft so that they can safely land, as well as take off and enter their correct flight corridors. The purpose of the game is to manage the flights that are presented to the player without the flights being delayed or exiting/landing in the wrong location. The aircraft either come flying in on the screen and have preset exit or landing points or show up as wanting to take off with an exit point. It is the player's job to determine the route each aircraft flies and when they may land or take off.

The aircraft cannot be too close to each other, so the player needs to make sure that they are passing each other on different flight levels or with sufficient distance (three grid dots north/south or east/west) between them. If an aircraft crashes, collides in midair with another aircraft, or exits at the wrong location or altitude, the system will inform the air traffic controller, and the game will end at the end of the shift. Aircraft do not change course/altitude unless the player tells them to. Incoming aircraft not given clearance to land, however, will go into a holding pattern and wait until given clearance. When necessary, the player can also give holding instructions to aircraft, as long as their course takes them over a VOR tower which is used as the holding fix.

To start with, there are few flights at the same time, but at higher GS levels, there are many flights that need management at the same time. Also storms which the aircraft can not pass through show up and some aircraft have very little fuel and have to land fast or they will crash.

There are five airspaces in the game:

- Atlanta
- Dallas/Fort Worth - Map includes an inaccuracy in that Love Field is portrayed as northeast of Dallas/Fort Worth International Airport when in fact it lies to the southeast.
- Denver - Includes the Rocky Mountains to the west, over which planes cannot fly below a certain level.
- Washington, D.C. - Includes the No-fly zone over the U.S. Capitol through which planes may not fly at all.
- New York City

Three types of aircraft are presented in the game:

- Cessna light planes - Referred to as "November" flights, a reference to their aircraft registration numbers which all start with N in the United States.
- Boeing 747 - Flies twice as fast as a Cessna light plane.
- Concorde - Flies twice as fast as a 747.

Four airlines are depicted in the game:

- American Airlines
- Delta Air Lines
- United Airlines
- Air France - Operates the Concordes

In both the Atari and C64 versions, the conversations between the controller and the aircraft are read out on the TV loudspeaker. Although they are quite ritualized and formal, and the blocks of words which make up the orders are clearly distinguishable, synthesized speech was an impressive feat for home computers that averaged fewer than 64 kilobytes of available RAM.

== Reception ==
Compute! stated that "the sweat on your palms when you play Kennedy Approach is quite real", and approved of the documentation. It concluded that the game "is a fascinating, well-designed simulation for someone who wants to get a taste of what air traffic controllers do all day (and night) ... Kennedy Approach gets a clammy hands rating of 9 out of a possible 10".
