= Lightspeed (video game) =

1990 video game

- Developer: MPS Labs
- Publisher: MicroProse
- Designers: Andy Hollis; Sandy Petersen
- Programmers: Jim Berry, Andy Hollis, Greg Kreafle
- Artist: Max D. Remington III
- Composers: Allen Black, Jeff Briggs, Ken Lagace, Scott L. Patterson, Jim McConkey
- Platform: MS-DOS
- Release: 1990
- Mode: Single player

Lightspeed is a video game developed and released by MicroProse in 1990. It features a space flight simulator game and action game elements with an emphasis on strategy and exploration. The box describes the title as an "Interstellar Action and Adventure" game. The game features space exploration, trade, combat and diplomacy in the same vein as 4X games such as Master of Orion. Lightspeed, unlike the popular series of turn-based strategy games, plays out in real-time.

A sequel, entitled Hyperspeed, was released by MicroProse in 1991. It was nearly identical to Lightspeed, except that it included two additional star clusters for veterans of the first game.

== Plot ==
The player must help recolonize the human race after the Earth's habitability is critically reduced by an ecological catastrophe. The entire human race is being housed in huge Conestoga-class colony ships, which are waiting for the player to secure at least one planet with an Earth-like environment and to also acquire enough material resources to ensure that the colony or colonies in question can build a fledgling industrial base as soon as possible.

The player is allowed limited time to accomplish this goal. In addition, the player must contend with the alien races living in the area that the player is exploring. The mission's success requires diplomacy to acquire allies and the elimination of races that may be potentially hostile to humanity. The player may also deem it necessary to destroy a friendly race in order to secure enough resources to successfully complete the objectives.

== Gameplay ==
Spaceflight is similar in style to the Wing Commander or X-Wing titles. Most races initially adopt a neutral stance towards the player, unless they ambush the player in between star systems. The player can then choose to attack or hold their fire, which can influence future relations with that species. The player may also choose to launch an unguided probe to initiate communications with neutral or friendly species. The player-controllable vehicles consist of the main Trailblazer-class cruiser (top left screenshot on box back) and small spacecraft chassis that can be quickly reconfigured for three different roles (that of a space superiority fighter, a powerful self-guided kamikaze missile with poor maneuverability or a weak homing missile with excellent maneuverability). The player can also launch an escape pod when their Trailblazer is hopelessly crippled.

Main viewscreen of Trailblazer ship. L/R displays show engineering status and engine speed/fuel. Radar lower right, current target lower left

In addition, the Trailblazer is also equipped with a fast moving turret with which to shoot down lightly armored fighter craft. While this weapon (along with the weapons equipped on a fighter-variant chassis) cannot penetrate capital ship armor, the Trailblazer is also equipped with a powerful front-mounted main gun to deal with larger threats. Guided missiles and kamikaze craft can also damage capital ships. Some aliens are equipped with shield generators that can negate main gun attacks. However, these generators are vulnerable to fighter and turret fire, as they are attached to the exterior of the ship. The shield component, along with certain weapon turrets, can be targeted by precision fire - a revolutionary feature for the time. This also ensures that no one weapon system becomes redundant at any point during the course of a game.

As a gameplay element, the Trailblazer cruiser can only be crippled but not destroyed. The ship also contains a view the ship's engine room, which allows the player to enhance the ship's performance by upgrading or replacing the ship's components. The engine room is split into various areas including the Spindrive FTL engine, main cannon, sublight engine, turret, and deflector shielding. These components can be destroyed in battle or by the use of the Emergency Spindrive function in order to retreat from battle and head to a safer star system to recoup and repair. If the Spindrive is running without additional components its fuel efficiency could drop to the point that it could become impossible to reach a friendly base to re-equip without running out of fuel. In this situation, the player would be forced to use the escape pod and return to main base for a replacement Trailblazer. This however would cost precious mission time.

The game gives the player the option to choose one of two star clusters in which to play in. The Hyades cluster is the easier of the two, while the Cerberus cluster offers a challenge for expert players. One can also engage in practice ship-to-ship combat from the main menu, or can elect to view a 3D gallery of some the ships in the game.

The game featured groundbreaking polygonal 3D graphics for its time, running at 320x200 256-color VGA resolution and quality if played on capable hardware.

== Reception ==
Reception

Review score
Publication	Score
Computer Gaming World	1.5/5

In a 1992 survey of science fiction games, Computer Gaming World gave Lightspeed one-plus stars out of five. A 1994 survey of strategic space games set in the year 2000 and later gave the game one star, describing it as "The lamentable predecessor to Hyperspeed". In 1996 the magazine ranked Lightspeed as the 46th worst game of all time, calling it "more repetitive than 'The Twelve Days of Christmas' with no payoff."

== Reviews ==
- Strategy Plus
