= Hyperspeed =

1991 video game

- Developer: MPS Labs
- Publisher: MicroProse
- Designers: Andy Hollis; Sandy Petersen
- Platform: MS-DOS
- Release: 1991
- Genres: Space combat, role-playing video game
- Mode: Single-player

Hyperspeed is a space combat role-playing video game developed by MicroProse Software in 1991 for MS-DOS, and is a sequel to Lightspeed.

== Plot ==
Hyperspeed is a game in which the player must discover a home for the relocation of humankind after the humans have made Earth practically uninhabitable. The player pilots a starship with a variety of weapons and encounters both friendly alien races, and hostile aliens that the player must either or broker peace treaties to allow the settlement of new worlds. The game allows the player to explore four different star clusters, each one with its own difficulty level.

== Gameplay ==
Spaceflight is similar in style to the Wing Commander or X-Wing titles. Most races initially adopt a neutral stance towards the player, unless they ambush the player in between star systems. The player can then choose to attack or hold their fire, which can influence future relations with that species. The player may also choose to launch an unguided probe to initiate communications with neutral or friendly species. The player-controllable vehicles consist of the main Trailblazer-class cruiser (top left screenshot on box back) and small spacecraft chassis that can be quickly reconfigured for three different roles (that of a space superiority fighter, a powerful self-guided drone with poor maneuverability or a weak homing missile with excellent maneuverability). The player can also launch an escape pod if the Trailblazer is hopelessly crippled.

In addition, the Trailblazer is also equipped with a fast moving turret with which to shoot down lightly armored fighter craft. While this weapon (along with the weapons equipped on a fighter-variant chassis) cannot penetrate capital ship armor, the Trailblazer is also equipped with a powerful front-mounted main gun to deal with larger threats. Guided missiles and drone craft can also damage capital ships. Some aliens are equipped with shield generators that can negate main gun attacks. However, these generators are vulnerable to fighter and turret fire, as they are attached to the exterior of the ship. The shield component, along with certain weapon turrets, can be targeted by precision fire - a revolutionary feature for the time. This also ensures that no one weapon system becomes redundant at any point during the course of a game.

As a gameplay element, the Trailblazer cruiser can only be crippled and not destroyed. The ship also contains a view the ship's engine room, which allows the player to enhance the ship's performance by upgrading or replacing the ship's components. The engine room is split into various areas including the Spindrive FTL engine, main cannon, sublight engine, turret, and deflector shielding. These components can be destroyed in battle or by the use of the Emergency Spindrive function in order to retreat from battle and head to a safer star system to recoup and repair. If the Spindrive is running without additional components its fuel efficiency could drop to the point that it could become impossible to reach a friendly base to re-equip without running out of fuel. In this situation, the player would be forced to use the escape pod and return to main base for a replacement Trailblazer. This however would cost precious mission time.

The game gives the player the option to choose one of four star clusters in which to play in. The Hyades cluster is the easiest, while the Cerberus cluster offers a challenge for expert players of alliance and morality. The Sasanid cluster features a despotic empire the player must decide to aid or oppose and the Ragnarok cluster features a great plan that may save or destroy the universe if implemented. One can also engage in practice ship-to-ship combat from the main menu, or can elect to view a 3D gallery of some the ships in the game.

The game uses polygonal 3D graphics, running at 320x200 256-color VGA resolution.

== Release ==
Hyperspeed was published by MicroProse Software in 1991.

Tommo purchased the rights to this game and published it digitally through its Retroism brand in 2015.

== Reception ==
Reception

Review scores
Publication	Score
Computer Gaming World	1.5/5
Dragon	4/5

Computer Gaming World initially rated the game positively stating that "Hyperspeed offers a refreshing change of pace to this genre" that will "reward players with smoothly animated graphics, excellent sound, and a well-developed, sometimes tongue-in-cheek, storyline." A 1992 survey of science fiction games by the magazine gave Hyperspeed one-plus stars out of five, and a 1994 survey of strategic space games set in the year 2000 and later gave the game three stars. Dragon also rated the game positively, praising the well written manual and comparing the game favorably with Wing Commander I and II.
