= Fable (1996 video game) =

- Developer: Simbiosis Interactive
- Publishers: NA: Sir-Tech; EU: Telstar Electronic Studios
- Platforms: MS-DOS, Windows
- Release: 1996
- Genre: Point-and-click adventure
- Mode: Single-player

Fable is a PC point and click adventure game developed by Simbiosis Interactive. It was the company's only release. It was published in North America by Sir-Tech and internationally by Telstar Electronic Studios.

== Gameplay ==
Fable runs on MS-DOS and Microsoft Windows, featuring SVGA graphics (DirectX in the Windows 95 version) and full voice-acting. The game has a minimalist user interface, showing only the cursor (which displays the current verb selected for use) and descriptive text.

The game follows the standard point-and-click adventure game formula of controlling the player using the mouse, while avoiding the need to display a list of verbs on-screen. Moving the mouse cursor over an object or person changes the cursor icon to represent a verb. (Use, Talk, etc.) Left-clicking will perform the action displayed, whereas right-clicking will cycle through other verbs relevant to whatever the cursor is pointing at.

== Plot ==
The plot follows Quickthorpe (the protagonist) attempting to complete a quest given to him by the priest of his village. He is to obtain four mystical gemstones said to have control over a part of nature. The priest tells Quickthorpe that he wishes to destroy the gems, as this will supposedly make the world fully habitable by the people of his village again. In order to obtain each gemstone, Quickthorpe must kill a creature acting as the gem's guardian.

Quickthorpe's first target is the Ice Giant living in the Northern region of the Frozen Lands - the area in which Quickthorpe's home village is located. As he continues through the Land of Mists, Quickthorpe learns of the Mecubarz; an ancient race of creatures from another world who used their technological secrets and special abilities to enslave the human race centuries ago. A small group of humans fought back, some using their own technology against them but none of them able to uncover any of the secrets of their enslavers before they ultimately left. Quickthorpe receives a key in relation to the Mecubar conspiracy before he kills the guardian of the next gemstone by talking to a friend of the fairy that informed him about the Mecubarz.

Having taken both the gemstones, Quickthorpe goes to an underwater town to find the Engulfed Fortress, in which he discovers an ancient guard. He reveals that the world had faced a catastrophic event caused by the Mecubarz as they left. Bribing the guard to leave his post, Quickthorpe enters a cave system that permits him to enter both the Engulfed Fortress and the Land of Shadows.

Going into the Land of Shadows allows Quickthorpe to get the third gemstone without any new information about the Mecubarz. Entering parts of the Engulfed Fortress allows Quickthorpe to encounter two more characters: an ancient humanoid creature named Ishmael and a Gorgon, the guardian of the final gem. Talking to the Gorgon reveals that she was part of a group of creatures that attempted to steal the secrets of the Mecubarz during the human's attempt to revolt. The leader of this group was Ishmael, who discovered that the gemstones were parts of the key Quickthorpe was given, and that the key was the only way to obtain the secrets of the Mecubarz. When assembled, the key would unlock the locked-off room behind the guardian.

Ishmael's determination to obtain these secrets leads him to convince the priest to give Quickthorpe the quest that started all of this. The guardian requests for Quickthorpe to kill her after telling him all this, which he obliges to do before taking the final gemstone. Having all the gemstones and the key, Quickthorpe confronts Ishmael about the whole issue, in which Ishmael shares his knowledge of the Mecubarz, hopeful that he'll receive the now fully assembled key. The Mecubarz were a race of creatures composed entirely of energy. To continue fuelling themselves, they used the human race. The main secrets behind the Mecubarz were their abilities to never die and to almost instantly travel to other worlds, and due to Ishmael's age, his focus has shifted mainly to gaining a means to become immortal. Hearing all of this, Quickthorpe decides to let him rot after telling him that he'll think about giving him the gemstones and key. Quickthorpe returns to where he killed the final guardian and completes the key, using it to take the secrets for himself. He finds himself in a strange room filled with advanced technology. Quickthorpe sits down on the chair and a holographic viewport attaches itself to his head, performs some unknown function, then detaches. Quickthorpe then stands up from the chair and power surges through his body.

=== International release ending ===
The game cuts to Quickthorpe reading a book (the same one featured on the main menu screen) in a jail cell before walking over to the bars of his cell door. The narrator who has been describing Quickthorpe's journey is revealed to be the warden, who reveals that Quickthorpe is in jail for murdering his family and that the other convicts have worked to get him a chocolate cake to celebrate his 21st birthday.

=== North American ending ===
Quickthorpe walks over to the particle streamer (a device for recording history) and uses it. Energy begins to surge through the room, causing all the equipment to smoke. We then see the energy running through Ishmael's throne, killing him. The scene abruptly changes to Quickthorpe returning to his village and knocking on the door. Wannette (Quickthorpe's girlfriend) appears on the balcony and upon seeing him, she opens the door and lets him in. Love hearts emerge from the balcony window and the words 'The End' appear on-screen.

== Development ==
The original ending received a great deal of negative feedback. Both players and reviewers cited the fact that the ending was too dark and didn't match the comedic tone present in the rest of the game. This prompted the developers to create a 'happy' ending which was put into the North American release only.

== Reception ==
Next Generation reviewed the PC version of the game, rating it three stars out of five, and stated that "it's a fine addition to a long line of traditional games, reminiscent of Sierra's King's Quest games, and certainly worth a look for any adventure fan." GameSpot called the game 'an earnest but uneven effort', praising the graphics and voice acting but criticising the design, convoluted story and unsatisfying ending.
