= Baughan (surname) =

Baughan is a surname. Notable people with the surname include:

- Blanche Baughan (1870–1958), English-born New Zealand poet, writer, and penal reformer
- John Baughan (1754–1797), English criminal
- Maxie Baughan (1938–2023), American football player
