= Testor Corporation =

American paint and tools manufacturer

Testors
- Founded: 1929; 97 years ago as The Testor Chemical Company
- Founder: Nils F. Testor
- Headquarters: Rockford, IL, U.S.
- Area served: Worldwide
- Products: Enamel paint, acrylic paint, aerosol paint, adhesive, cutting tools
- Brands: Testors; Model Master; Spray Chalk; Testors Craft
- Parent: Rust-Oleum
- Website: testors.com

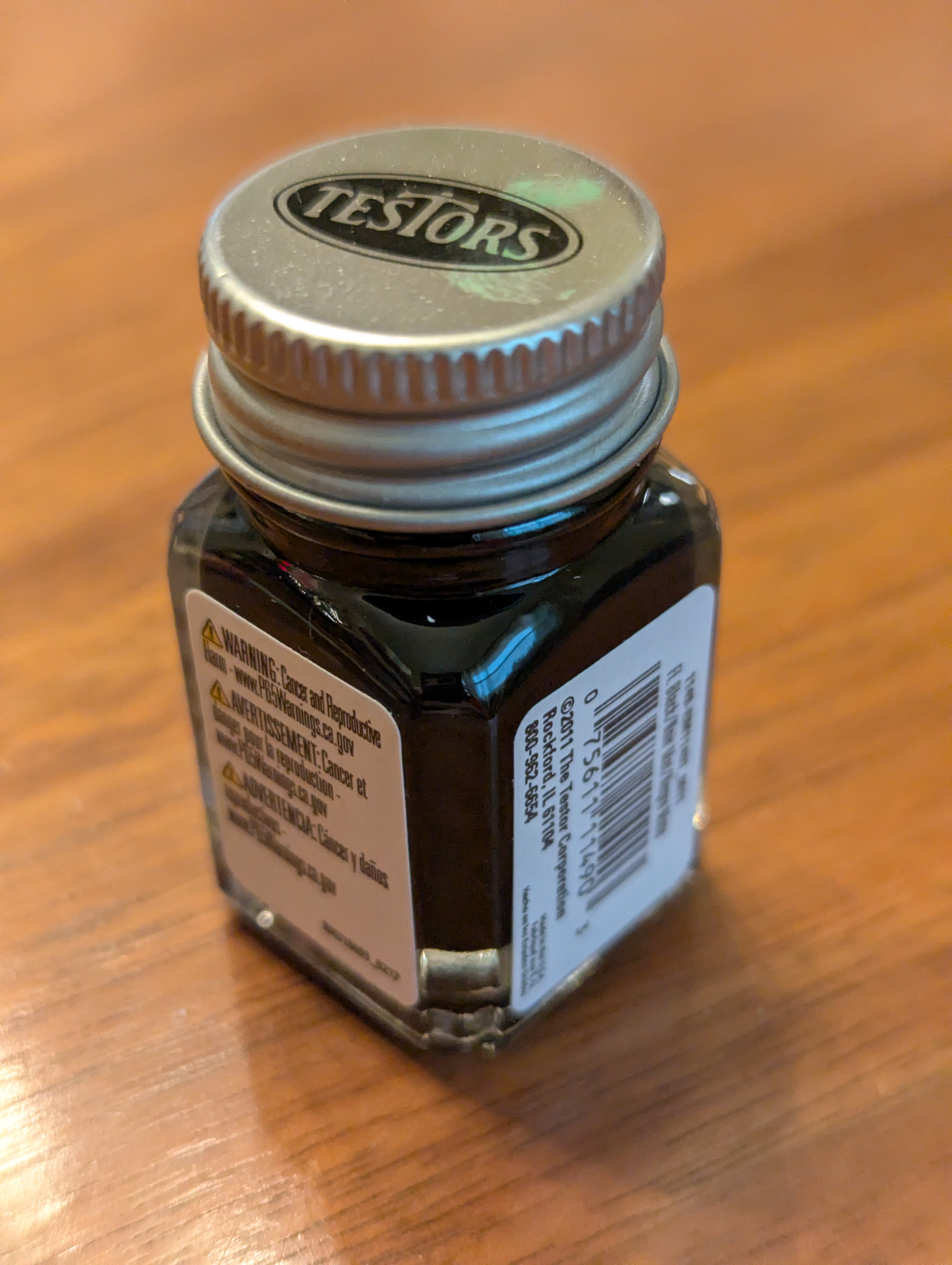
A small bottle of black Testors enamel paint

Testor Corporation (or Testors) is an American manufacturer of tools and accessories for scale model kits. The business is based in Rockford, Illinois, and is part of RPM International. It was founded in 1929 and its products are made in the US and marketed to customers worldwide.

The Testors' line of products include enamel paints, acrylic paints, aerosol paints, adhesives, brushes, cutting tools, commercialised under the Testors, Model Master, Spray Chalk, and Testors Craft brands.

== History ==
=== Beginnings ===
Axel Karlson had been producing a product known as "Karlsons Klister" (klister being Swedish for glue), which was originally intended for use in the repair of women's stockings, but had quickly found use in other applications as well.

By the time Testor arrived, cobblers had become the product's primary market. Coming to the conclusion that the only way to save his new acquisition was to sell the product to additional markets, Testor renamed the adhesive "Crystal Clear Household Cement" and began marketing it to households as a general-purpose repair product, while continuing to sell a large quantity to shoemakers.

Testor's actions proved to be successful, and by 1936 the company was able to expand its product line. Staying true to its status as a chemical corporation, hobbyist model cement and butyrate dope were introduced to the public. Four years later, Testor Corporation became a founding member of The Hobby Industry of America, an association of hobby parts suppliers and manufacturers.

=== World War II ===
Industrial production, necessitated by World War II, caused severe shortages of raw materials for manufacturers not directly involved in the war effort. In Testor's case, this manifested itself in difficulties acquiring the chemicals necessary to continue producing its line of adhesives and paints. As a result, the company was forced to branch out into other segments of the hobby market. To this end, Testor began producing static scale models of popular aircraft out of pinewood. These scale models proved enormously popular, and enabled Testor Corporation to survive, despite its inability to produce its flagship chemical products in any significant quantity.

On February 1, 1944, a fire broke out at Testor's main Rockford facility. In addition to totally destroying the upper two floors of the four-story brick building, production lines and equipment suffered severe damage from both the fire itself and from the water used to douse the flames. Total damage was estimated at over US$200,000; however, in less than a year a new, larger plant was built and production continued. With the end of the war, the company was able to resume production of its trademark glues and paints, including adhesives for the plastics that were quickly becoming popular. Additionally, surpluses of ultra-lightweight balsa wood left over from the war enabled the company to begin producing flying wooden aircraft models as well as provide raw balsa wood for builders of custom-designed models.

=== Acquisitions and partnerships ===
In 1949, Nils Testor began talks with Charles Miller, president of Duromatic Products (and father of actress Susan Saint James), regarding a possible partnership. Duromatic was the manufacturer of the McCoy hobby engine, a popular motor for self-propelled models. These talks culminated in a joint marketing agreement of the McCoy engine with Testor model airplanes, as well as an agreement for each company to design its respective products to be interoperable with those of the other.

By the 1960s, plastics had risen to prominence in American life, including the hobby industry. Almost all model kits on the market were plastic, necessitating paints (the square, glass Testor paint bottles were sold in almost every dime store, department store, hardware store, toy store and hobby store in the US in the 1960s, making them truly ubiquitous) and glues different from those used for wooden models. Although Testor had been producing such chemicals since the 1940s, it had resisted producing plastic model kits for quite some time. However, the company could not stick to its tried-and-true line of wooden models indefinitely, and so in the early 1970s it purchased IMC and the Hawk Model Company, both well-respected manufacturers of plastic model kits. Later that same decade, the Italian model kit manufacturer Italeri was acquired, further expanding Testor's line of plastic model kits, usually repackaged with photographs rather than paintings on the box.

In 1984–87, Testors sponsored a video series "Adventures in Scale Modeling". The program featured half-hour segments on detailed model building with an on-location shoot featuring the item being modeled. The shows were produced by WSWP-TV.

From the late 80s through today, Testors partnered up with diecast brands such as Bburago, Jouef, Racing Champions, Lincoln Mint, Maisto, etc. to rebox them as model kits, usually for younger modelers as an alternative to the traditional plastic models also reboxed at the time.

== F-19 ==
In January 1986 Testors released a model kit of a hypothetical F-19 Stealth Fighter, designed using open source intelligence before the real F-117 Nighthawk was introduced. Although it was very different from the actual plane, video games and many other toys and models were inspired by this fictional design. Many features, such as canted fins, were used on the Nighthawk and other subsequent stealth designs. A Soviet fighter would be produced as well.

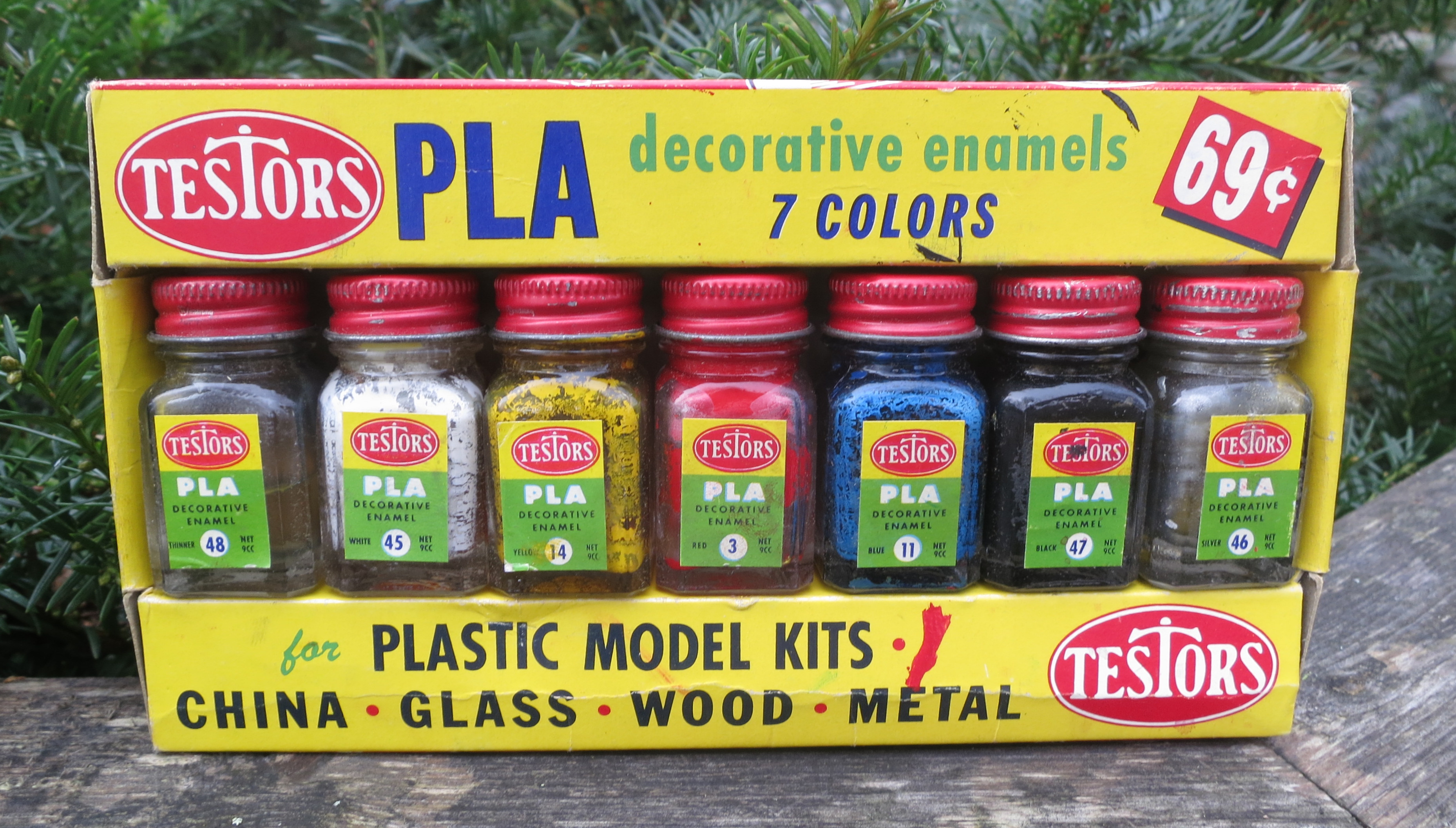
Testors' PLA decorative enamels 7 colors from the 1950s
