= The Ford Simulator =

1987 video game

- Developers: Beck-Tech; The SoftAd Group
- Publisher: Ford Motor Company
- Series: Ford Simulator
- Platform: MS-DOS
- Release: 1987
- Genre: Vehicle simulation
- Mode: Single-player

The Ford Simulator is a vehicle simulator developed for MS-DOS by The SoftAd Group and Beck-Tech and published by Ford Motor Company in 1987. It was designed to promote the 1988 Ford line of automobiles.

== Gameplay ==
The goal of the game is to give players an idea of how 16 different car models from the 1988 Ford lineup would drive. It was created to mimic the physics of driving each car. The game features 4 different events in which the player can drive the cars. The events are Touring, Drag Strip, Slalom and Grand Prix. The Touring event allows the player to simply drive and become familiar with the car. The Drag Strip event is a straight road which records the player's best time from 0 to 60. The Slalom event is a winding road formed by cones, with the hazard of avoiding these cones one has to make their fastest time to the finish. The Grand Prix event is a 5-lap race around a track. Each event is intended to show how different parts of the car behave under certain conditions.

At the end of each of the events is an Info Center page covering the mechanics of the vehicles offered in the game. The Info Center contains graphics depicting multiple Ford systems including the Drive Systems, Aerodynamics, Fuel injection, Turbocharging, Steering, Braking, Suspension, and the Airbag system.

It also comes with a buyer's guide to building their dream car and calculating its price. The buyer's guide has four major categories: Model Specifications, Options, Sticker, and Buyer's plan. The Model Specifications cover the selected model's basic specs and major standard features. The Options add option packages and individual options to customize the chosen model. Sticker allows the player to print out a completion sticker with information on the chosen model. The Buyer's plan uses a financial spreadsheet to calculate the user's cost and payments. The final segment of the game is the Ford Customer Response, where the player is asked to do a survey that they can then print out and mail to Ford.
