= The Crystal Rainforest =

1992 video game

- The Crystal Rain Forest box art
- Developer: Sherston Software
- Publisher: Sherston Software
- Designer: Simon Hosler
- Programmer: Simon Hosler
- Artist: Suzanne Hosler
- Writer: Simon Hosler
- Series: Mission Control
- Platforms: Acorn Archimedes; Windows 98; Windows 2000; Mac OS
- Release: Acorn Archimedes: 1992; Microsoft Windows: November 1999
- Genre: Educational puzzle game
- Mode: Single-player

The Crystal Rainforest is an educational puzzle video game developed and published by Sherston Software for use in primary schools. Originally released in 1992 for the Acorn Archimedes computer platform, the game later saw releases for Microsoft Windows and Mac OS in 1999.

== Development ==
The Crystal Rainforest was part of the Mission Control series developed by Sherston Software, a software company based in the United Kingdom.

In the early 1990s, it was initially released for the Acorn Archimedes computer platform in 1992. In 1999, a later version of The Crystal Rainforest was released for Microsoft Windows and Mac OS. This update introduced new graphics.

== Gameplay ==
Players have the opportunity to create short Logo programs to overcome obstacles and progress in the game.

The game is designed for single-player mode, at an individual pace. It is available in Acorn Archimedes, Windows 98, Windows 2000, and Mac OS.

== Plot ==
The Crystal Rainforest is set in the world of the planet Oglo, where the kingdom of Azon faces a grave threat. The once-thriving rainforest, home to magical crystals, is now endangered due to the destructive activities of the "Cut and Run Gang". These antagonists relentlessly cut down the forest.

The game begins as the king of Azon is shot with a poison dart while trying to protect the rainforest from the Cut and Run Gang. Two protagonists then step on an adventurous quest to retrieve the magical rainforest crystals and save the king from the poison's deadly effects. Simultaneously, their mission is to preserve the rainforest. As the story progresses, the protagonists face numerous puzzles.

== Reception ==
The Crystal Rainforest was lauded for its incorporation of various interactive puzzles and programming elements, which were seen as promoting hands-on learning and encouraging students to think creatively.

Some critics questioned whether the game provided enough "structured learning opportunities" for children with specific educational needs, such as dyslexic students. Some critics suggest that it may be more of a point-and-click adventure with puzzles than a "structured teaching medium".

The game sold over 20,000 copies in the UK.
