= Prism Leisure Corporation =

Distribution and publishing company

Prism Leisure Corporation Plc
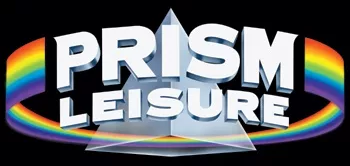
- Company type: Public limited company
- Genre: Publisher and distributor of DVDs and videos, CDs and cassettes, video games and toys
- Founded: 1980; 46 years ago
- Founder: Geoff Young
- Defunct: June 4, 2007; 19 years ago
- Fate: Administration; Entertainment assets acquired by FremantleMedia; Music assets acquired by Prism Leisure Ltd.
- Successors: Prism Leisure Ltd; FremantleMedia Home Entertainment
- Headquarters: Enfield, Middlesex, UK
- Key people: Geoff Young
- Subsidiaries: Odyssey Video

Prism Leisure Corporation Plc was a distribution and publishing company that primarily focused on reissues and compilations, often at low prices. The company was located in Enfield, Middlesex, United Kingdom until it was placed into administration in June 2007.

== History ==
The company was founded in 1980 as Geoff's Records by chairman Geoff Young.

The company was taken private in November 1998 after a management buyout.

The company launched an online store in 2001.

The company expanded in 2002 by acquiring competitors and became the UK's leading wholesaler and worldwide distributor of CDs, cassettes, computer games, videos and DVDs. They also handled board games and toys.

In 2004, the company sold its retail locations. The Great Yarmouth King Street store was renamed "Better Leisure" and closed in October 2012.

=== Collapse and Sale ===
On 4 June 2007, Prism Leisure was placed into administration. Their entertainment assets were acquired by FremantleMedia while the music assets were acquired by ex-employee Ivor Young, who formed a successor business Prism Leisure Ltd. to continue releasing CDs. Despite sharing the same name, the two Prism Leisure businesses had no legal connection. On 16 January 2008, the company signed a deal with Go Entertain for the distribution of Prism Leisure Ltd.'s catalogue in some countries. The company continued to release music material, including purchasing the catalogue of distributor Telstar Records until being acquired by Phoenix Music International in 2013.

== Products ==
=== DVD/video ===
Prism Leisure became a major publisher and distributor of budget home video on DVD and VHS. Titles include films such as Doomwatch, The Jigsaw Man, March or Die, The Brave Little Toaster, The Shawshank Redemption, Help! I'm a Fish, Treasure Island and The Whistle Blower. They also released television series including Birds of a Feather.

==== List of studios distributed by Prism Leisure ====
This is a selection of companies that had their DVDs released by Prism Leisure.

- Abbey Home Media
- Addictive Films
- Arrow Films (a few titles including Fritz the Cat and The Kentucky Fried Movie)
- Carlton Video
- DIC Entertainment
- Digital Entertainment Limited
- Film 2000
- FremantleMedia
- Full Moon Entertainment
- Granada Ventures (done after the Carlton-Granada merger)
- Lionsgate Home Entertainment (a few of their old films)
- Medusa Pictures
- Metrodome Distribution
- M.I.A (also known as "Missing In Action", not to be confused with the 1984 film)
- Momentum Pictures
- Odyssey Video
- Redbus Film Distribution (at this time, Redbus Home Entertainment)
- Sanctuary Visual Entertainment
- Second Sight Films
- Tartan Films
- Third Millennium
- Troma

=== CD/cassette ===
The majority of Prism's musical catalogue were compilations and reissued material, including Jefferson Airplane's Feed Your Head: Live '67–'69. Several compilations by country music singer Kenny Rogers were also released and/or distributed by Prism throughout their existence, of both his solo and group material.

=== Video games ===
Prism Leisure entered the video game industry in 1986 by creating the label Endurance Games to publish the ZX Spectrum and Amstrad re-releases of System 3's International Karate and purchasing Addictive Games, home of the best-selling Football Manager, the following year. Addictive was used as a full price label (with releases including HotShot, The Kristal and further Football Manager games) while the Paxman Promotions name was used for compilations. Prism also became the UK publisher for the US company First Star Software and saw them release new versions of some of their games, including Superman: The Game and Boulder Dash II. Many old games were licensed for compilations with some getting individual releases.

=== Other merchandise ===
Prism Leisure also distributed board games and toys.
