= Full Count Baseball =

1984 sports video game

- Publisher: Lance Haffner Games
- Platforms: Apple II, Commodore 64, IBM PC
- Release: 1984
- Genre: Sports

Full Count Baseball is a sports video game published in 1984 by Lance Haffner Games.

== Gameplay ==
Full Count Baseball is a game in which players may run statistics-based baseball games as a simulations, or create teams for league play.

== Reception ==
Lew Fisher and Eric Faust reviewed the game for Computer Gaming World, and stated that "FC is first rate, by far the best game in Haffner's line of sports games."

David M. Wilson and Johnny L. Wilson reviewed the game for Computer Gaming World, and stated that "this text-heavy statistics-based baseball simulation offers extremely accurate replays."

Duane E. Widner reviewed the game for Computer Gaming World, and stated that "One nice feature is the ability to input your own players and teams. This capability, combined with one's own baseball encyclopedia, allows a player to program virtually anyone that has ever picked up a bat (including his minor league seasons)."
