= First Expedition =

1988 simulation video game

- Publisher: Interstel Corporation
- Designer: Steven Englestead
- Platform: MS-DOS
- Release: 1988
- Genre: Nautical simulation

First Expedition is a nautical simulation video game published in 1988 for MS-DOS by Interstel Corporation.

== Gameplay ==
First Expedition is a game in which a nautical simulation involves a quest to find three sun spheres that were stolen from the island of Shandola.

== Reception ==
Dennis Owens in Computer Gaming World stated of First Expedition, "Not recommended for adventure gamers unless they are interested in intricate navigational techniques". Jerry Pournelle said in BYTE that it "manages faithfully to simulate all the long boring aspects of sailing ... I can't imagine that anyone at the company ever played this turkey".
