= The Fleet Street Phantom =

1987 video game

- Developers: Simon Hosler; Bill Bonham
- Publisher: Sherston Software
- Platforms: Apple II; BBC Micro; Acorn Electron; MS-DOS
- Release: October 1987
- Genres: Educational, adventure

The Fleet Street Phantom is an educational video game in the guise of an adventure game published in 1987 by Sherston Software for Apple II, BBC Micro, Acorn Electron, then later for MS-DOS. Developed by Simon Hosler and Bill Bonham, the player assumes the role of a reporter in a British newspaper office, proofreading articles in order to infer the identity of a mysterious criminal in London. The game was designed as a game supplement for Sherston's Typesetter! desktop publishing application. The game was received positively by critics and educators.

== Gameplay ==
The player must resolve errors in the articles they are assigned to proofread in order to deduce the identity of Phantom (BBC Micro version).

Set in the office of a fictional London newspaper, the player of The Fleet Street Phantom assumes the role of a junior reporter. To seize Phantom, an elusive street criminal, the player must resolve errors in the articles they are assigned to proofread. With the help of clues, the player is able to refine the identify of Phantom. Through their proofreading, the game simultaneously puts emphasis on punctuation, speed reading ("skimming and scanning"), inferencing, and sequencing—as well as identifying topics and predicting—to promote these skills in younger players.

As a reward for capturing Phantom, the company of the newspaper promotes the player as their editor. There are two levels of difficulty. The game provides a travel guide listing British landmarks and slang.

== Development and release ==
Simon Hosler and Bill Bonham developed The Fleet Street Phantom for Sherston Software in 1987. The game was originally developed for the Apple II, the BBC Micro, and the Acorn Electron. Sherston Software published the game in the United Kingdom in October 1987. In the 1990s, Sherston ported the game to MS-DOS.

The Fleet Street Phantom was developed as a video-game supplement to Sherston's Typesetter!, a desktop publishing application released in early 1987. Unlike Fleet Street, Typesetter! was a graphics-less affair, aimed at primary schoolers to teach them both how to use desktop publishing software and how to lay out text in a broadsheet newspaper. Sherston developed Fleet Street in collaboration with the London Daily News, a broadsheet founded in February 1987 by Maxwell Communications. The newspaper lasted only five months, collapsing in July 1987, just before the publication of Fleet Street Phantom.

Despite being ostensibly named after a folkloric 17th-century ghost in London who once assaulted a horse-drawn taxi driver named Tom Cox on London's Fleet Street, the eponymous phantom of The Fleet Street Phantom bears precious little resemblance to said ghost. The game did serve to revive this bit of folklore among British students in the 1980s, however, according to the author Lauren Jane Barnett.

== Reception ==
The Fleet Street Phantom was received positively by critics and educators. Elizabeth Denis of The Micro User praised the game's graphics and writing: "The graphics are very good—detailed, well-drawn scenes in good colour and clear text make this a very attractive package. There are a few humorous details and the denouement had my junior testers laughing at the animation". The Times newspaper contributor and primary school teacher Phil Tayler called both The Fleet Street Phantom and the Typesetter! application popular among his pupils. He called the graphics "superb" and wrote that users would "immensely enjoy the storyline". A positive review in THE Journal: Technological Horizons in Education, recommended the game for students aged eight to thirteen.

Another reviewer, for the Education Software Directory of Rickitt Educational Media, lauded the game's graphics and activities. In particular, the Directory reviewer perceived those activities as having been developed with attention paid to teaching primary writing skills. While aimed at primary schoolers, the reviewer for Rickitt called the game appealing to adults as well because of the quality of its graphics and gameplay. A writer for A & B Computing assessed the game's setting as a "great way to introduce youngsters to the trials and tribulations of desktop publishing" and the game overall as a quality product. Though the Rickitt review did not identify the game as having been developed for people with special needs, Becta listed the game as helpful for promoting proper spelling for those with dyslexia.

== See also ==
- Headline Harry and the Great Paper Race
