= Headline Harry and the Great Paper Race =

1991 educational video game

- Developer: Davidson & Associates
- Publishers: Davidson & Associates
- Platforms: Classic Mac OS, MS-DOS
- Release: 1991: MS-DOS; 1992: Mac
- Genre: Educational

Headline Harry and the Great Paper Race is an educational video game by Davidson & Associates based on newsroom journalism. It was published in 1991 MS-DOS and 1992 for Classic Mac OS. The game has a "find-the-clue" format in the vein of Where in the World is Carmen Sandiego?.

== Reception ==
Caitlin Ackelson reviewed the game for Computer Gaming World, and stated that "Headline Harry is a newsworthy "scoop" in educational software. Funny and compelling, it gives kids a reporter's-eye view of U.S. history. With its treasure-hunt approach to learning and adventure game format, the game provides an entertaining approach to U.S. political and cultural history and the fast-paced, superglamorous world of journalism."

The Los Angeles Times described it as "Carmen San Diego Meets the Front Page". Compute! called the game "Complex, but not frustrating".

== See also ==
- The Fleet Street Phantom
