= The Kristal =

1989 video game

- Developer: Fissionchip Software
- Publishers: Addictive Games; Cinemaware
- Director: Michael Sutin
- Producer: Mark Pearce
- Designers: Rodney Wyatt; Michael Sutin
- Programmer: Alan Butcher
- Artist: Michael Haigh
- Writer: Michael Sutin
- Composers: Rodney Wyatt; Mickey Keen
- Platforms: Amiga, Atari ST, MS-DOS
- Release: NA: 1989; EU: 1989
- Genre: Adventure game
- Mode: Single-player

The Kristal is an adventure game first released in 1989 for the Amiga computer. It was later released for the Atari ST and MS-DOS. It was developed by the UK-based company Fissionchip Software, and published in Europe by Addictive Games and in the US by Cinemaware. Unusually for a video game, the game is based on a play, The Kristal of Konos, written in 1976; the authors of the play worked together with the game developers and the play was never shown in theatres or on film before the game's release. A dialog introducing the setting was recorded by Patrick Moore, who introduced both the game and play.

The player takes the role of a pirate named Dancis Frake, on a mission to recover the "Kristal" on behalf of the Kring of Meltoca.

The game features a number of different classic game genres merged: fighting, space flight/combat, and (to a limited extent) LucasArts-style point-and-click adventuring.

== Reception ==
The game was reviewed in 1989 in Dragon #152 by Hartley, Patricia, and Kirk Lesser in "The Role of Computers" column. The reviewers gave the game 4 1/2 out of 5 stars. Computer Gaming World gave the game a negative review, citing the poor controls for the action sequences and the repetitive interrogation of other characters. The review stated that The Kristal is virtually unplayable, and that only the arcade gamers who have the time and patience will master this "challenge".
