= Fighter Wing =

1995 combat flight simulator video game

- Developer: Gemsoft
- Publisher: Merit Studios
- Platform: MS-DOS
- Release: WW: 1995
- Genre: Combat flight simulator
- Modes: Single-player, multiplayer

Fighter Wing is a combat flight simulation game developed by Russian studio Gemsoft and published in 1995 by Merit Studios for MS-DOS.

== Gameplay ==
Fighter Wing is a flight simulator for multiple players.

== Reception ==
In 1996, Computer Gaming World declared Fighter Wing the 21st-worst computer game ever released.
