= Sherston Software =

Publisher of educational games

- Industry: Software
- Founder: Bill and Lou Bonham
- Successor: Big Clever Learning
- Services: Educational games, learning resources

Sherston Software, also known as Sherston Publishing Group, was a British software publisher producing educational games and learning resources.

Two teachers, Bill and Lou Bonham, started making games for the BBC Micro in 1983 and established Sherston Software Limited in 1984. In 2003, Bill and Lou sold Sherston to a four-man management team, which led to the company being called Sherston Publishing Group. In 2008, the offices in Angel House, Sherston, Wiltshire also became home to BLi Education which owned the brands TAG Learning, Economatics Education and SEMERC. TAG Developments (based in Kennington, London) was also part of the group and produced MAPS – Managed Assessment and ePortfolio System – which featured some Sherston software content. In difficult trading conditions in the education market in 2010 and 2011, BLi Education went into administration but many of the assets were acquired by Sherston Publishing Group.

Sherston employed developers in India. An associate company, Sherston Sheshani operated out of an office in Cape Town, South Africa. Sherston also had an office in the United States (Sherston America) based in Portland, Oregon. Sherston Software also published software in association with partners including BBC Worldwide, HarperCollins and Oxford University Press.

In 2015, Sherston was acquired by private equity firm Big Clever Learning, and the original company was liquidated in 2016.

== Software products ==
- Planet Sherston
- Rusty Dreamer
- Tizzy's Toybox
- Crystal: The ICT Channel
- Gogglebox: Topic Based Online Channel
- Sherston Mega Deal
- Sherston Online
- Sherston Skill Builders Online
- The Crystal Rainforest
- Mission Control
- The ArcVenture series
- The Map Detectives
- The Nature Park Adventure
- The Email Detectives
- Izzy's Island
- Gomez Returns
- Number Train
- abc-CD - Animated Alphabet
- Skill Builders
- School's Out - After School Club
- 123-CD
- The Crystal Maze (based on the popular British TV game show The Crystal Maze)
- Furbles
- Space Mission Mada (later to be adapted into Australian TV show Space Mission Mada News)
- Tina's Terrible Trumpet
- The Worst Witch (based on the book The Worst Witch)
- The Future Is Wild
- Typesetter! (desktop publishing program)
- The Fleet Street Phantom (supplement to Typesetter!)
- Charlie Chimp's Big Modelling Party
