= F-15 Strike Eagle III =

1992 video game

- Developer(s): MPS Labs
- Publisher(s): MicroProse
- Producer(s): Andy Hollis
- Designer(s): Christopher Clark; James M. Day; Andy Hollis; George Wargo
- Artist(s): Barbara Miller
- Composer(s): Jeff Briggs
- Platform(s): MS-DOS
- Release: December 1992
- Genre(s): Combat flight simulator
- Mode(s): Single-player, multiplayer

F-15 Strike Eagle III is an F-15E Strike Eagle combat flight simulator game released in 1992 by MicroProse for MS-DOS. It is the sequel to F-15 Strike Eagle and F-15 Strike Eagle II, and the third and final game in the series.

The fighter is equipped with a M61 Vulcan and both air-to-air and air-to-ground missiles, as well as free-fall and laser-guided bombs. Available scenarios are: Iraq, Panama, and Korea. Missions usually involve taking out one primary and one secondary target, while avoiding attacking friendly targets. The player can receive promotions and medals based on their mission scores.

For its time, Strike Eagle III boasted impressive graphics, although enemy planes are not nearly as detailed as the player's F-15. Special attention was put into the terrain and geography, to the extent that real buildings and geographical sites are visible ingame, such as the Iraqi Presidential Palace in Baghdad.

The enhanced CD-ROM edition adds 15 minutes of introductory video, a tutorial, and new scenarios, including flight missions based on those of the Desert Storm campaign.

== Development ==
The game had a development budget of $1.2 million.

== Reception ==
Computer Gaming World's reviewer Doug Fick, an F-16 pilot with the Vermont Air National Guard, in April 1993 praised F-15 III's graphics and detail, stating that "the systems and aircraft are very faithfully reproduced". He approved of the accuracy of the flight model ("Spectrum Holobyte and the Falcon 3.0 team could learn something about realistic flight characteristics from this program"). Fick disliked the slow performance, but concluded that "it definitely is a worthy simulation". In a January 1994 survey of wargames the magazine's Evan Brooks gave the title four stars out of five, stating that it had "state-of-the-art graphics and game value". In April 1994 the magazine said that the CD version was "a good buy for either the novice or veteran sim enthusiast". In August 1994 the magazine's simulation columnist Tom Basham called the flight model "a mixed bag", approving of aircraft performance varying by altitude but criticizing the "instantaneous" handling. He concluded that although superior to Falcon 3.0 in many areas, F-15 was not a simulation because "many things ... 'burst the bubble', that constantly reminded me this isn't for real".

== Sales ==
The game sold 110,000 copies in its first two weeks, and 150,000 copies by February 1993.
