= F-19 Stealth Fighter =

1988 video game

- Developer: MicroProse
- Publisher: MicroProse
- Designer: Sid Meier
- Programmers: Andy Hollis; Sid Meier; Jim Synoski
- Artists: Max D. Remington III; Murray Taylor
- Composer: Ken Lagace
- Platforms: MS-DOS, Amiga, Atari ST, PC-98
- Release: 1988: MS-DOS; 1990: Amiga, ST; 1992: PC-98
- Genre: Air combat simulation
- Mode: Single-player

F-19 Stealth Fighter is a combat flight simulator developed by MicroProse and released in 1988 for MS-DOS and 1990 for Amiga and Atari ST. Based on a fictional United States military aircraft, it is a 16-bit remake of Project Stealth Fighter released for the Commodore 64 in 1987. It was ported to the NEC PC-98 in Japan. The MS-DOS version was re-released on Steam in 2015.

F-19 Stealth Fighter was developed before the public unveiling in 1988 of the F-117 Nighthawk attack aircraft – which the video game sought to represent – and carried over the focus on the fictional F-19 from Project Stealth Fighter, based on the 1986 F-19 model kit released by Testors. Although an aircraft selection screen offering the real F-117 was added, MicroProse's rendering of the optional "real" jet was based on the deliberately vague 1988 press photo of the aircraft and had distinctly wrong, stubby and wide proportions.

Critically acclaimed, the game was followed in 1991 by Night Hawk: F-117A Stealth Fighter 2.0, which finally removed the old, fictitious aircraft design and instead offered only a new, much more accurate model of the real F-117.

== Gameplay ==
Cockpit view

In the game, the player takes on the role of a pilot flying missions of varying difficulty over four geographic locations: Gaddafi's Libya, the Persian Gulf, the North Cape, and Central Europe. The game can be played under conditions of conventional warfare, limited warfare, or cold war (in the latter, even being detected by the enemy can lead to a major diplomatic incident).

The player can choose appropriate ordnance from a wide range of realistic armaments, and the game features convincing behavior from AI-controlled units such as enemy aircraft, SAM sites and radar stations. These behave in accordance with the situation – patrolling at first, but launching into a highly aggressive search if the player is detected. Other features of the game are a realistic system of radar detection, where the player's varying radar signature is visually compared with the energy of incoming radar pulses at different ranges and powers, and a variety of endings appropriate to the outcome of each mission. These include the player being rescued by a Sikorsky SH-3 Sea King, a Pravda newspaper headline proclaiming the capture of the pilot, or an outraged ally or neutral nation protesting the destruction of their aircraft.

The pilot roster in the pre-game menu keeps track of the missions, rank, score and medals awarded to each player. Pilot fatalities are permanent, which contributes to the extended campaign feeling of the game.

== Development ==
After the completion of Project Stealth Fighter for the Commodore 64 by designers Jim Synoski and Arnold Hendrick, Sid Meier and Andy Hollis were brought in to work on the PC conversion. Hendrick wrote of the new game: "The only thing borrowed from the C64 would be the game scenario concepts, military equipment research data, and perhaps some flight dynamics algorithms". Despite its planned 30 September 1988 release being delayed to mid-November F-19 Stealth Fighter was very popular, selling out in just two months.

MicroProse released the game on the same day that the United States military first admitted the existence of its F-117A Nighthawk stealth fighter. Before the game's release, many had speculated on a missing aircraft in the United States Air Force's numbering system, the F-19. The game was based on an educated guess about what the secret stealth fighter would be like. Subsequent revisions of the game incorporated the actual F-117 as well as the F-19.

The original boxed version of the game came with a range of accessories, such as a thick manual full of information on the late 1980s flying machines of the U.S. and the USSR, various keyboard overlays, a comprehensive manual covering stealth and fighter tactics, and roughly-sketched maps of each warzone.

== Reception ==
Computer Gaming World in 1989 gave F-19 Stealth Fighter a very favorable review and acclaimed the game's level of realism, stating that "to master this program you are going to have to do your homework. The documentation includes tutorials on aerodynamics and flight principles, radar, stealth technology, air-to-ground tactics, and air-to-air tactics". A 1992 survey in the magazine of wargames with modern settings gave the game three stars out of five, and a 1994 survey gave it two-plus stars. Compute! favorably reviewed the IBM PC version's graphics and realism.

Computer Gaming World recognized F-19 as the "Simulation Game of the Year", calling it a perfect marriage of modern technology and game. Software Publishers Association gave the game its Excellence in Software Award for "Best Simulation". The Smithsonian National Air and Space Museum selected F-19 Stealth Fighter for a 1989 exhibition on "Flight Enters the Computer Age". In 1990 the game received the sixth-highest number of votes in a survey of Computer Gaming World readers' "All-Time Favorites". The game's ports won the Golden Joystick Awards '91 in the category "Best Simulation - 16 Bit". F-19 was ranked as the 29th best Amiga game by Amiga Power in 1991, and as the 52nd best game of all time by Computer Gaming World in 1996.

F-19 Stealth Fighter was awarded the Origins Award for "Best Military or Strategy Computer Game of 1988" and "Best Screen Graphics in a Home Computer Game of 1988".

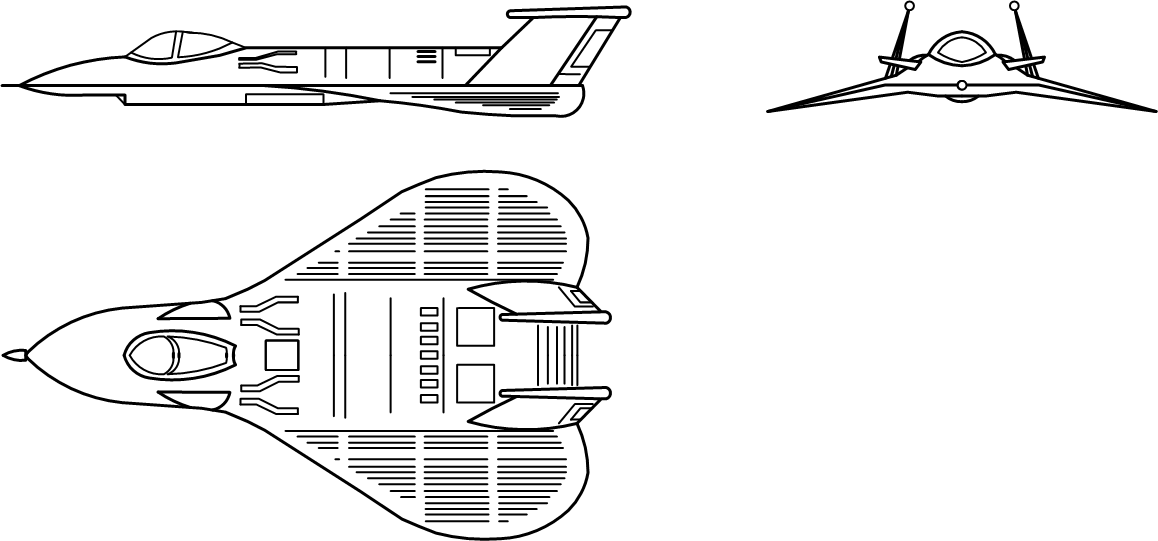
The F-19 fighter model for the game
