= Freddy's Rescue Roundup =

1984 video game

- Developer: IBM
- Publisher: IBM
- Designers: D. P. Leabo; A. V. Strietzel
- Platform: IBM PC DOS
- Release: 1984
- Genre: Platform
- Mode: Single-player

Freddy's Rescue Roundup is a non-scrolling platform game for IBM PC DOS released in 1984 by IBM. The goal of the game is to collect all of the roadrunners on a particular level in order to advance through the game. Doorways aid in quickly traveling across a level, while enemy robots work against the player's progress. Visually, it is similar to Broderbund's Lode Runner, but there is less emphasis on puzzles.

== Development ==
Gameplay screenshot

The development title was Roadrunner Rescue. There was a crude program for editing mazes, but it wasn't in the shipped version, at least partly because IBM felt it made the game too much like Lode Runner.

The game is written mostly in compiled BASIC v1.0, with a few assembly modules linked in for graphics, sound, and keyboard support.
