= Boffin (video game) =

1985 video game

- Developer(s): Paul Julian O'Malley
- Publisher(s): Addictive Games
- Designer(s): Paul Julian O'Malley
- Platform(s): Acorn Electron, BBC Micro
- Release: UK: 1985
- Genre(s): Platform
- Mode(s): Single-player

Boffin is a platform game published in 1985 by Addictive Games for the Acorn Electron and BBC Micro. It was written by 17-year-old Paul Julian O'Malley, who at the time was a resident of Romsey, Hampshire, UK.

Initially released for the BBC Micro in 1984, it was subsequently re-released in 1985 with one side of the tape now featuring its sequel Boffin 2, which ran on both the BBC Micro and the Electron.

== Gameplay ==
The aim of Professor Boffin is to pass through a series of caverns as quickly as possible by destroying all of the unlucky horseshoes in each cavern and then touching the resident owl, guardian of each cave.

The Boffin can only jump short distances, but he can fall from any height by opening his umbrella to slow his descent to a safe speed. Each level ends when the player touches an owl which is usually located at the bottom of the screen. The 'lucky' owl can only be touched without resulting in death if all of the 'unlucky' upside-down horseshoes have been destroyed.

The umbrella mechanic was unique at the time, and means that many levels progress from the top of the screen to the bottom, which was unusual as most platformers since Donkey Kong required the player to travel from bottom to top. Also the use of Mode 5 graphics on the second version of the game meant that the graphics were much larger and more colourful than many contemporary games (although the trade-off was that it was very blocky).

The game features giant menacing tarantulas which cannot be killed, and only advance across the screen in one direction (right to left). They remain motionless until the Boffin is in their line of sight, then rapidly run forwards.

== Release ==
The game was first released for the BBC Micro in October 1984 on one cassette. In July 1985 it received an upgraded second release, with the cassette now containing two different versions of the game. The first version on the tape (confusingly referred to as 'version 2' and sometimes known as Boffin 2) features twenty five caverns and is playable on both the BBC Micro and Acorn Electron. The second version on the tape ('version 1', the game of the original release) is still only playable on the BBC Micro only, featuring twenty different caverns. 'Version 2' is in the very blocky graphical Mode 5 (possibly Mode 2), the different memory requirements allowing it to run on both the BBC Micro and Electron, whilst 'version 1' is in the much more defined (but less colourful). The graphics and puzzles differ considerably between the two versions, although the underlying theme is identical.

== Reception ==
Jon Revis of Electron User praised the tarantula: "He is drawn in superb detail and the characteristic jerky movement of such arachnids - not a programming defect - is impeccable". Although at the time the magazine did not award scores, the review concludes that despite there being many similar games on the market, "...Boffin has sufficient originality to succeed against all the competition".

== Legacy ==
Superior Software later released a similar game Elixir, in which a scientist is shrunk to miniature size and must navigate around his laboratory to collect items to restore his size.
