= Football Manager (1982 video game) =

1982 video game

- Developer: Addictive Games
- Publisher: Addictive Games
- Designer: Kevin Toms
- Series: Football Manager
- Platforms: TRS-80, ZX80, ZX81, ZX Spectrum, BBC Micro, VIC-20, Commodore 64, Oric, Amstrad CPC, Acorn Electron, Dragon 32/64, Atari 8-bit, MSX, MS-DOS, Atari ST, Amiga
- Release: January 1982
- Genres: Sports, business simulation
- Mode: Single-player

Football Manager is a hybrid sports video game and business simulation released by Addictive Games in 1982. Designed by Kevin Toms, it is the first game in the Football Manager series.

== Gameplay ==
Text based screen on the ZX Spectrum

Graphical highlight section on the ZX Spectrum. A goal has just been scored.

The game was written entirely in BASIC. Apart from the match highlights on some versions, it used only text displays and keyboard entry. The player chooses a team and then must try to earn promotion from the fourth to the first division, and win the FA Cup. Although, the player can then keep playing for as many seasons as they wish.

While the team and player names are real, they are not accurately represented, so whichever team is selected the player always starts in the fourth division and their team is randomly populated with players. Each player has a skill rating from 1 to 5 and an energy rating from 1 to 20. In earlier versions of the game the player would be offered to buy a new player, the selection for this was randomised. Players must be rested to renew their energy rating, or they become injured. At the end of each season, the players' skill ratings randomly change at the end of the season, according to Kevin Toms, this was to keep the game's challenge going and not make it boring. The team has ratings of defence, midfield, and attack (the total skills of all defenders, midfielders, or attackers selected), energy (an average of all selected players), and morale (which increases when the team wins and decreases when they lose).

As the match is played, the screen is updated if a goal is scored. For versions with animated graphics highlights, attempts on goal are shown in isometric 3D at either end of the pitch, with a scoreboard showing the current score. The player cannot affect the game while it is in progress. The player must also balance finances. Weekly income and expenditure is calculated, banks loans can be also taken out. These bank loans contain a credit limit depending on which division they're in: 250,000 pounds for division four, 500,000 pounds for division three, 750,000 pounds for division two and 1,000,000 pounds for division one. There is also a basic player transfer system. Random players become available to buy, which the player can bid for. If the squad reaches the maximum of 16, no players will be available to buy. The player can also list their own players for sale and then accept or reject bids. Game progress can be saved at any time. A customiser utility was included with the game, so players could rename the teams and players.

== Development and release ==
Kevin Toms developed the first game, which was text-only, on a Video Genie, a clone of Tandy's TRS-80. The title evolved out of a board game Toms first designed aged 11 that was itself inspired by the 1968 football management simulation board game Soccerama. Early iterations were modelled on the cardboard from cereal packets and blank card decks, but Toms was inspired to develop it into a computer game after purchasing a ZX81 and deciding this was a "much better tool to run the game on, especially for automating things like the league table calculations and fixtures". One of his major problems during development was the memory of the ZX81, names of the teams along with the players had to fit into 8 characters. For this reason, clubs like Southampton were left out of the game as Toms couldn't find a way to shorten the name properly. According to him, development lasted about a year with him doing it part-time while working as a programmer in the Open University.

Graphical highlight section on the Commodore 64 version

It was later converted to Sinclair's ZX80 and ZX81, and Toms created the software label Addictive Games to launch the game in January 1982, leaving his job at the Open University for it. It was then ported to the ZX Spectrum with added animated graphics showing match highlights. The game was a huge success and was ported to a wide range of systems between 1984 and 1987. While the Amiga, Amstrad CPC, Atari ST, BBC Micro, Commodore 64, MSX, and DOS versions, kept, or improved all features such as the match highlights graphics, all others (including the Acorn Electron, Atari 8-bit computers, Commodore 16, and Plus/4) were, like the original, text only. The Commodore 64 version of the game was released in North America in 1984.

== Reception ==
Football Manager was a commercial hit, selling 500,000 copies in its first six years available. The game was well received by the gaming press, although Sinclair User did comment on the lack of realism of the teams and individual player ratings. The excitement of watching the game in progress was often seen as the highlight of the game. Electron User argued that the game was "one of the best strategy games available for home computers", with reviewer Dave Carlos stating: "I doubt that this game will ever be bettered." Reviewers such as Andrew Rollings and Iain Macintosh have considered that the game started the football managerial genre.

The game was nominated in the 1983 Golden Joystick Awards for best strategy game, eventually coming second to the Melbourne House adventure game The Hobbit. In 1985, Tony Hetherington of Computer Gamer included the game in "The Spectrum Collection – 15 classic games that all Spectrum owners should have". By 1991, when reviewing the £2.99 budget release, Amiga Power awarded a score of only 19% as the game had been "out-featured by practically every other game in the genre" but was "still massively addictive", and referred to as a "classic" and "one of the legends of computer gaming". The ZX Spectrum version was voted the 26th best game of all time in a special issue of Your Sinclair magazine in 2004.

Steve Mann for Personal Computer World said: "I can vouch for the satisfaction that can be gained from this program. Recommended." Bob Wade for Personal Computer Games said: "It is one of the most addictive games I have ever played."

== Legacy ==
In August 2015, Toms began rewriting the original 1982 Football Manager game for mobile devices after pitching the idea to his followers, drawing on his work experience of business app development. The new game, titled Football Star* Manager and also known as Kevin Toms Football Star* Manager, was released in 2016 to an overwhelmingly positive response from buyers, many of them former players of the original Football Manager series. It was first released on iOS and Android; since its release, the game has been ported to macOS, Windows 10, and Amazon Fire. The game is as near to the original Football Manager as one can get on the new platforms. In January 2022, Toms launched a Kickstarter to fund a new version of his Football Manager game, titled Football New Manager, to mark the 40th anniversary of the original game. In 2025, Curveball Games released Kevin Toms Football Star* Manager on 14 August 2025 to Steam.
