= Machination =

- Promotional release poster
- Directed by: Sarah Jayne; Ivan Malekin
- Written by: Sarah Jayne; Ivan Malekin
- Produced by: Sarah Jayne; Ivan Malekin
- Starring: Steffi Thake; Sean James Sutton
- Cinematography: Ivan Malekin
- Edited by: Ivan Malekin
- Music by: Gerard Mack
- Production company: Nexus Production Group
- Distributed by: Nexus production Group
- Release date: 20 May 2022
- Running time: 62 minutes
- Country: Malta
- Language: English

Machination is a 2022 Maltese horror thriller film written, produced and directed by Sarah Jayne and Ivan Malekin. Starring Steffi Thake.

== Plot ==
News of an out of control pandemic has gripped the world and mass panic is pushing humanity into an uncertain future. Maria (Steffi Thake), a sensitive and anxious woman, struggles to cope in self-isolation. With fear mounting and the demands of the world closing in, Maria is forced to confront her past and the monsters that surround her … both without and within.

== Cast ==
- Steffi Thake as Maria
- Rambert Attard as Yorgen
- Sean James Sutton as Ian
- Andrew Bonello as Peter
- Mikhail Basmadjian as Father

== Release ==
The film was released to digital on 20 May 2022.

== Reception ==
Noel Murray of the Los Angeles Times wrote that while the film is "not an easy movie to watch", it is "admirably unflinching in the way it observes Maria’s tics and phobias, showing how even something as seemingly benign and beneficial as hand-washing can become emblematic of a deeper self-loathing."

Daniel Tihn of the Times of Malta rated the film 2 stars out of 5 and wrote that "after a litany of directionless technical issues", it "ends up being more hollow than haunted."

JP Nunez of the Horror Obsessive called the main character "boring", the plot "mostly meandering and directionless" and the imagery "very random and haphazard."
