= Addictive Games =

UK video game publisher

- Founded: Milton Keynes, England, 1982
- Founder: Kevin Toms
- Fate: Sold to Prism Leisure Corporation
- Headquarters: Bournemouth, England

Addictive Games was a UK video game publisher in the 1980s and early 1990s. It is best known for the Football Manager series of games created by company founder Kevin Toms. The company was originally based in Milton Keynes, England, and later relocated to Bournemouth, in southern England.

== History ==
The company was set up by Kevin Toms in 1982 in order to launch the Football Manager game he had written for the TRS-80 and ZX81 computers. Initially, this was just by mail order from advertisements placed in computer magazines. In September 1982, Addictive Games launched the ZX Spectrum version of Football Manager, with added match action graphics. The addition of the graphics actions was very popular, and the game went on to be a number one best seller, with the games being stocked in major retailers. The success of Football Manager allowed Toms to move the company to commercial premises in Richmond Hill in the centre of Bournemouth. In 1984 the game was ported to the BBC Micro and Commodore 64. By 1987, Football Manager had been ported to 16 different platforms.

In 1984, Addictive used the short-lived Silicon Joy label for games by other authors, 'specially selected' by Kevin Toms, but in 1985, after Toms launched his next game Software Star, Addictive also began publishing games by other authors including Boffin by Paul Julian O'Malley and Kirel by Siegfried Kurtz. Headcoach, an American football sports strategy game written by Simon Davies was released in the summer of 1986 and reached No. 3 in the W H Smith UK sales charts. Toms went on to write the political strategy game President released in 1987.

The company was bought by Prism Leisure Corporation in 1987. Prism used the Addictive name for full price game releases (including HotShot in 1988, The Kristal in 1989 and the later Football Manager games), as well as selling older Addictive games (particularly Football Manager) in their budget ranges and in compilations.

== Releases ==
=== Addictive Games ===
- Football Manager, 1982 (TRS-80, ZX81, ZX Spectrum, BBC Micro, C64, Oric, Amstrad CPC, Electron, Dragon, VIC-20, Atari 8-bit computers, C16, Plus/4, MSX, Amiga, Atari ST, IBM compatibles)
- Software Star, 1985 (ZX Spectrum, C64, Amstrad CPC)
- Stringer, 1985 (C64)
- Boffin, 1985 (BBC Micro, Electron)
- Arac, 1986 (C64)
- Kirel, 1986 (ZX Spectrum)
- Head Coach, 1986 (ZX Spectrum, C64)
- President, 1987 (ZX Spectrum, C64, Amstrad CPC)
- Football Manager 2, 1988 (ZX Spectrum, C64, Amstrad CPC, Amiga, Atari ST, MS-DOS)
- Hot Shot, 1988 (ZX Spectrum, C64, Amstrad CPC, Amiga, Atari ST, MS-DOS)
- Battle Stations, 1988 (C64)
- Metaplex, 1988 (ZX Spectrum, C64, Amstrad CPC)
- Hyperforce, 1989 (Amiga, Atari ST)
- The Kristal, 1989 (Amiga, Atari ST, MS-DOS)
- Aquanaut, 1989 (Amiga, Atari ST)
- Football Manager World Cup Edition, 1990 (ZX Spectrum, C64, Amstrad CPC, MSX, Amiga, Atari ST, MS-DOS)
- Football Manager 3, 1992 (ZX Spectrum, C64, Amstrad CPC, MS-DOS)

=== Silicon Joy ===
- Caves of Rigel, 1984 (Atari 8-bit)
- Grand Prix Manager, 1984 (ZX Spectrum)
- Boxing, 1984 (ZX Spectrum)
- Run Your Own League, 1984 (ZX Spectrum)
- Trio, 1984 (ZX Spectrum) - 3 games: Ascot, Chaotic Caverns, Dracula's Castle
