= Football Manager (1982 series) =

Association football management video game series

- Genre: Sports management
- Developer: Addictive Games
- Publisher: Addictive Games
- Creator: Kevin Toms
- Platforms: TRS-80, ZX80, ZX81, ZX Spectrum, BBC Micro, VIC-20, Commodore 64, Commodore 16 & Plus/4, Oric, Amstrad CPC, Acorn Electron, Dragon 32/64, Atari 8-bit, MSX, MS-DOS, Atari ST, Amiga
- First release: Football Manager; 1982
- Latest release: Football Manager 3; 1992

Football Manager is a video game series published and developed by Addictive Games, the label set up by the game's creator Kevin Toms. The first game was released in 1982, which then started a whole new genre of computer games, the football management simulation. It was then ported to most home computers during the 1980s and spawned several sequels, starting with Football Manager 2 in 1988, followed by Football Manager World Cup Edition in 1990, and finally Football Manager 3 in 1992, the first without Toms' involvement. Football Manager 3 sold poorly, and as a result the series came to an end. The series was claimed to have sold over a million copies by 1992, and close to two million copies overall.

== Football Manager ==
Toms developed the first game on a Video Genie, a clone of Tandy's TRS-80. A text-only game, it was converted to Sinclair's ZX80 and ZX81, and Toms created the software label Addictive Games to launch the game in 1982. With added animated graphics showing match highlights, it was then ported to the ZX Spectrum.

== Football Manager 2 ==
Following the sale of Addictive Games to Prism Leisure Corporation in 1987, Toms concentrated on creating a second Football Manager game. Unlike the original BASIC only game, the sequel required machine code, which meant working with a number of developers for various systems. For the ZX Spectrum version, this was Bedrock Software. Unlike the first game that was stagger-released over a period of five years, Football Manager 2 was launched on all formats at the same time in June 1988, although it was available on a much smaller range of systems, including Commodore 64, ZX Spectrum, Amstrad CPC, Amiga, Atari ST, and PC.

== Football Manager World Cup Edition ==
=== Development and release ===
Football Manager World Cup Edition was again designed by Toms with various programmers for different systems, including Bedrock Software for all 8-bit versions. A main figure in the management of the game was lost and not replaced and with the deadline of the FIFA World Cup dictating the release date, Toms felt the game was rushed and unfinished. This was the last involvement Toms had with either the series or Addictive Games. The game was released in Summer 1990 (to tie in with the 1990 FIFA World Cup) on all platforms Football Manager 2 had been as well as the MSX. The game was released in a big box with World Cup wallchart and competitions including a chance to feature on the cover of the upcoming Football Manager 3 along with Toms, although this was never honoured as Toms had no involvement with that game.

=== Gameplay ===
The team talk screen on the Atari ST. The player can choose one of the three possible responses.

Gameplay was radically changed from the previous two games. The player chooses a national team and must qualify for and then compete in the World Cup, although choosing champions Argentina or hosts Italy skips qualification. Player names can be entered at the start of the game ensuring they are correct.

While there is no financial element or any transfers, the basic team management elements of the previous games are still retained. There is more detail in the team set up such as each player being given tactics. The highlights are again shown over three screens, albeit played from top to bottom rather than left to right; there is also the option of watching from an overhead view of the whole pitch.

The main addition to the game is the ability to talk to your players in the dressing room and to the press. A graphical screen is shown and the player can choose from a set list of phrases to answer reporters' questions before a game and motivate the team in the dressing room at half time. This affects the team's morale which in turn affects their performance.

=== Reception ===
Your Sinclair gave a broadly positive review, particularly praising the new team talk and reporters' questions but questioned if it could win over new fans. It gave a score of 82% concluding "it's slick, well-programmed and it's got more depth than Marianas Trench [sic], but if you don't like management games you'll probably end up using the pictures of Kevin Toms to throw darts at." Spanish magazine MicroHobby gave the game a score of 60%. The Spectrum version of the game went to number 2 in the UK full price sales charts, behind Italy 1990.

== Football Manager 3 ==
=== Development and release ===
Football Manager 3, while already planned when Toms was still working with Prism Leisure on the World Cup Edition, was created without any involvement from the series' creator. Toms cited "artistic differences" for the breakdown in the relationship between himself and Prism. The game was instead developed by Brian Rogers of Bedrock Software who had actually been involved in programming the series since Football Manager 2. Release of the game was delayed. While a playable demo of the ZX Spectrum version was included on the cover tape of the September 1991 issue of Your Sinclair, with an expected release date "a couple of months" later, the game was finally released at the end of 1992. Although versions were planned and advertised for all platforms Football Manager 2 had been released on, the ST and Amiga versions were never released.

=== Gameplay ===
The manager's office screen on the PC. The picture of the team is highlighted so the player will go to the training screen.

The game is completely redesigned and bears little resemblance to the previous instalments. The game centres around a graphical screen of the manager's office with different parts of the game accessed by clicking on various items (e.g. the computer screen for results and fixtures, the picture of the team for training, and the like). The game features a full 92 team league system (including the Charity Shield for the first time) and the teams begin the first season in the correct divisions (the 1991–1992 season for most versions, the 1992–1993 season including the newly formed Premier League in the C64 version). As in previous game, the player's team will always begin in the bottom division; however, the players do not resemble real footballers and have random names (always shown with middle initials). The game always begins with a team of aging players with low skill ratings.

There is much more detail for individual player attributes with three endurance and five skill values that can be altered through training. Each player also has a face which is shown when picking the team. Player contracts have to be negotiated and out of contract players will leave the club. The transfer market is much improved with each team in the league having named players for the first time with histories that can be studied when deciding to buy a new player. The matches are shown side-on with the whole pitch on screen. They are also meant to represent the whole game rather than edited highlights. Text commentary is shown at the bottom of the screen as the match is played. Unlike the previous two games, there is no chance to change tactics or substitute at half time. The team talk and reporter elements are also removed in this version.

=== Reception ===
The game was not as well received as previous versions. Philip Lindey in Sinclair User suggested it was "difficult to get excited about Football Manager 3", and that it was overpriced, giving an overall score of 73%. Stuart Campbell in Your Sinclair thought the game was "not quite up to the standard of Football Manager 2, to be honest, with vastly inferior presentation and graphics, and lots of hanging around while the computer thinks and doesn't seem to be working properly", giving a score of 70%. Also arguing it did not live up to Football Manager 2, Amstrad Action awarded the game only 38%,

== Legacy ==
The Football Manager name was acquired in 2003 by Sports Interactive as a continuation for their Championship Manager series after they lost the naming rights following a split with their publishers Eidos Interactive.

In August 2015, Toms began rewriting the original 1982 Football Manager game for mobile devices after pitching the idea to his followers, drawing on his work experience of business app development. The new game, titled Football Star* Manager and also known as Kevin Toms Football Star* Manager, was released in 2016 to an overwhelmingly positive response from buyers, many of them former players of the original Football Manager series. It was first released on iOS and Android; since its release, the game has been ported to macOS, Windows 10, and Amazon Fire. The game is as near to the original Football Manager as one can get on the new platforms. On 14 August 2025, Curveball Games released Kevin Toms Football Star* Manager to Steam.

In January 2022, Toms launched a Kickstarter to fund a new version of his Football Manager game, titled Football New Manager, to mark the 40th anniversary of the original game. It was renamed Kevin Toms Football Game and released in 2023. Football Manager 2 was included in The Spectrum, which was released in November 2024.

== See also ==
- Championship Manager (1992–2016)
- Football Manager (2004–present)
- Premier Manager (1992–2012)
- FIFA Manager (1997-2013)
- Pro Evolution Soccer Management (2006)
