= List of World War II video games =

Below is a list of video games that center on World War II for their setting.

== Adventure games ==
=== A Stroke of Fate series ===
- A Stroke of Fate: Operation Valkyrie (2009)
- A Stroke of Fate: Operation Bunker (2009)

=== Charles Games' FMV series ===
- Attentat 1942 (2017)
- Svoboda 1945: Liberation (2021)

=== Other adventure games ===
- Trinity (1986)
- Remembering Pearl Harbor (2016) (VR)
- Paradise Lost (2021) (alternate history)
- Gerda: A Flame in Winter (2022)
- Train to Sachsenhausen (2022) (mobile)
- Torn Away (2023)
- Aviators (2024) (Free. Multi-genre.)
- The Darkest Files (2025) (Post-war)
- When We Disappear (TBA, 2026?)

== Puzzle games ==
- TR-49 (2026) (Post-war)

== Action-adventures ==
=== Other action-adventures ===
- The Train: Escape to Normandy (1987) (Multi-genre)
- Castlevania: Portrait of Ruin (2006) (alternate reality)
- Medic: Pacific War (2024) (Multi-genre)
- Marvel 1943: Rise of Hydra (TBA, 2027?) (alternate reality)
- Mythic: Forest Warden (TBA, 2027?) (alternate reality. Multi-genre.)
- Nekome: Nazi Hunter (TBA, 2027?)
- Operation Highjump: The Fall of Berlin (TBA, 2027?) (alternate reality)

== First-person shooters ==
=== The Wolfenstein series ===
- Wolfenstein 3D (1992)
- Spear of Destiny (A Wolfenstein 3D Graphics Adventure) (1992)
  - Spear of Destiny Mission 2: Return to Danger (1994)
  - Spear of Destiny Mission 3: Ultimate Challenge (1994)
- Return to Castle Wolfenstein (2001)
- Wolfenstein: Enemy Territory (2003)
- Wolfenstein (2009)
- Wolfenstein: The Old Blood (2015)

=== The Medal of Honor series ===
- Medal of Honor (1999)
- Medal of Honor: Underground (2000)
- Medal of Honor: Allied Assault (2002)
- Medal of Honor: Frontline (2002)
- Medal of Honor: Rising Sun (2003)
- Medal of Honor: Pacific Assault (2004)
- Medal of Honor: European Assault (2005)
- Medal of Honor: Heroes (2006)
- Medal of Honor: Vanguard (2007)
- Medal of Honor: Airborne (2007)
- Medal of Honor: Heroes 2 (2007)
- Medal of Honor: Above and Beyond (2020)

=== Mirage Media's Mortyr series ===
Series also linked to City Interactive's Battlestrike series.

- Mortyr (1999) (aka. Mortyr: 2093-1944)
- Mortyr II (2004)

==== City Interactive's Battlestrike series and other games ====
Including their other budget WWII FPS games:

- World War II Sniper: Call to Victory (aka. Battlestrike: Call to Victory) (2004)
- World War II Combat: Road to Berlin (aka. Battlestrike: Secret Weapons of WWII) (2006)
- World War II Combat: Iwo Jima (aka. The Heat of War) (2006)
- Wolfschanze 1944: The Final Attempt (2006)
- Battlestrike: Force of Resistance (aka. Mortyr 3) (2007)
- Operation Thunderstorm (aka. Mortyr: Operation Thunderstorm) (2008)
- Royal Marines Commando (2008)
- Battlestrike: Shadow of Stalingrad (2009)
- Wolfschanze II (2011)

=== The Battlefield series ===
- Battlefield 1942 (2002)
  - Battlefield: 1942: The Road to Rome (2003 expansion pack)
  - Battlefield: 1942: Secret Weapons of WWII (2003 expansion pack)
- Battlefield Vietnam World War II Mod (Mod for BF Vietnam) (2005)
- BattleGroup42 (Mod for BF 1942) (2003)
- BattleGroup42: Pacific (Mod for BF Vietnam) (2005)
- Battlegroup Frontlines (Mod for BF 2) (2007)
- Experience World War 2 (Mod for BF 1942 and BF 2) (2003, 2010)
- FinnWars (Mod for BF 1942) (2004)
- Forgotten Hope (Mod for BF 1942) (2003)
- Forgotten Hope 2 (Mod for BF 2) (2007)
- Battlefield Heroes (2009)
- Battlefield 1943 (2009)
- Battlefield V (2018)
- Battleground 44 (Mod for BF 2) (2021)

=== The Call of Duty series ===
- Call of Duty: Classic (2003)
  - Call of Duty: United Offensive (2004) (expansion pack)
  - Call of Duty: Finest Hour (2004)
- Call of Duty 2 (2005)
  - Call of Duty 2: Big Red One (2005)
- Call of Duty 3 (2006)
  - Call of Duty: Roads to Victory (2007)
- Call of Duty: World at War (2008)
  - Call of Duty: World at War – Final Fronts (2008)
  - Call of Duty: World at War (Nintendo DS) (2008)
- Call of Duty: WWII (2017)
- Call of Duty: Vanguard (2021)

=== Burut CT's ÜberSoldier series ===
- ÜberSoldier (2006)
- ÜberSoldier II (aka. Crimes of War) (2008)

=== Corvostudio's Easy Red series ===
- Easy Red (2017)
- A Front Too Far: Normandy (2018) (Multi-genre)
- Easy Red 2 (2020)
  - Easy Red 2: Stalingrad (2022) (Expansion)
  - Easy Red 2: Normandy (2023) (Expansion)
  - Easy Red 2: Ardennes 1940 & 1944 (2023) (Expansion)
  - Easy Red 2: Shanghai - Nanking (2025) (Expansion)
  - Easy Red 2: Blood on the Danube (2026) (Expansion)

=== Warlines Studios' WWII Operations series ===
Series titles are free to download.

- OSS: WW2 Operations (2017)
- WWII Operations: Desert Front (2020)
  - WWII Operations: Lions on The Desert Front (2022) (Spin-off of Desert Front)
- The Quick Run - WWII Operations (2021)

=== Thunder Devs.' BattleRush series ===
- BattleRush (2018)
- BattleRush 2 (2018)
- BattleRush: Ardennes Assault (2019)

=== Polygon Art's budget WW2 FPS series ===
- Beyond Enemy Lines' - Remastered Edition (2021)
- United Assault - Normandy '44 (2021)
- United Assault - Battle of the Bulge (2022)

=== Troooze, Inc.'s World War FPS series ===
- World War: Prologue (2023)
- World War: Combat Guardian (2023) (2nd game)
- World War: D-Day PART ONE (2023) (3rd game)
- World War: D-Day PART TWO (2023) (4th game)
- World War: Battle of the Bulge (2024)

=== Other first person shooters ===
- World War II GI (1999)
- D-Day: Normandy (2000)
- Elite Forces WWII: Normandy (2001)
- Elite Forces: WWII – Iwo Jima (2001)
- Beyond Normandy: Assignment Berlin (2003)
- Airborne Hero: D–Day Frontline 1944 (2004)
- Ardennes Offensive (2004)
- WWII: Soldier (aka. S.O.E.: Operation Avalanche) (2005)
- History Channel's ShootOut! The Game (2006)
- The History Channel: Battle for the Pacific (2007)
- Hour of Victory (2007)
- Turning Point: Fall of Liberty (2008)
- Operation Wolfsburg (2010)
- Dino D-Day (2011)
- Heroes and Generals (2012)
- Enemy Front (2014)
- Front Defense: Heroes (2017)
- Raid: World War II (2017)
- Battalion 1944 (2019)
- Brass Brigade (2019) (Multi-genre)
- End of War 1945 (2020)
- Land of War: The Beginning (2021)
- WW2: Bunker Simulator (2022)
- Frontline 1942: Battles of the World War 2 (2023) (aka WW2 Frontline 1942: War Game)
- UNITED 1944 (2023, EA)
- Darkenstein 3D (2025)
- Projekt Z: Beyond Order (TBA, 2026?) (alternate history)
- Blunt Force (TBA, 2026?) (VR)
- Mythic: Forest Warden (TBA, 2026?) (alternate reality. Multi-genre.)
- Legion of Honor (TBA, 2027?)
- Steelblood: Allied Front
- Platoon 44 Normandy

== Tactical shooters ==
=== The Hidden & Dangerous series ===
- Hidden and Dangerous (1999)
  - Hidden & Dangerous: Devil's Bridge (expansion pack) (2000)
  - Hidden & Dangerous Deluxe (improved Gold Edition with mission editor) (2002)
- Hidden and Dangerous 2 (2003)
  - Hidden and Dangerous 2: Sabre Squadron (expansion pack) (2004)

=== The Deadly Dozen series ===
- Deadly Dozen (2001)
- Deadly Dozen: Pacific Theater (2002)
- Deadly Dozen Reloaded (2022)

=== The Day of Defeat series ===
- Day of Defeat (2003)
- Day of Defeat: Source (2005)

=== The Red Orchestra series ===
- Red Orchestra: Combined Arms Mod (2003-4)
- Red Orchestra: Ostfront 41-45 (2006)
  - Mare Nostrum (Mod) (2008)
  - Darkest Hour: Europe '44-'45 (Mod) (2008)
- Red Orchestra 2: Heroes of Stalingrad (2011)
  - Rising Storm expansion (2013)

=== The Brothers in Arms series ===
- Brothers in Arms: Road to Hill 30 (2005)
- Brothers in Arms: Earned in Blood (2005)
- Brothers in Arms: D-Day (2006)
- Brothers in Arms DS (2007)
- Brothers in Arms: Hell's Highway (2008)
- Brothers in Arms: Double Time (2008)

=== The Sniper Elite series ===
- Sniper Elite (2005)
- Sniper Elite V2 (2012) (remastered in 2019)
- Sniper Elite 3 (2014)
- Sniper Elite 4 (2017)
- Sniper Elite VR (2021)
- Sniper Elite 5 (2022)
- Sniper Elite: Resistance (2025)

=== Other Tactical shooters ===
- Battle Europe (1993)
- My Worst Day WW2 (2005)
- Commandos: Strike Force (2006) (multi-genre)
- Sniper: Art of Victory (2008)
- Day of Infamy (2017)
- Fog of War (2018)
- Vanguard: Normandy 1944 (2019, EA)
- Days of War (2020)
- Warfare 1944 (2020) (Drakeling Labs / MicroProse)
- Enlisted (video game) (2021)
- Hell Let Loose (2021) (Multi-genre)
- Operation: Overlord (2023) (DLC for Operation: Harsh Doorstop (2023))

== Rail shooters ==
- Beach-Head (1983) (multi-genre)
- The Train: Escape to Normandy (1987) (multi-genre)
- Pearl Harbour (1988)
- Pearl Harbor: Attack! Attack! (2001)
- Pearl Harbor: Defend the Fleet (2001)
- B-17 Gunner: Air War Over Germany (2001)
- Operation Blockade (2002)
- Pacific Gunner (2002)
- WWII: Desert Rats (2002)
- Air Raid: This is not a Drill (aka. Air-Raid: This Is No Drill!) (2003)
- Battlestrike: Road to Berlin (2005)
- Battlestrike: The Siege (2005)
- Pearl Harbor Encounter (2012)
- Brave Witches VR: Operation Baba-Yaga – Counter Attack in the Snow (2017) (alternate reality. Delisted 2023.)
- Beach Invasion 1944 (2022)
- World War: Fury Wave (2024)
- Keep (TBA, 2026?) (alternate history)

== Shoot 'em up games ==
=== The 194X series ===
- 1942 (1984)
- 1943: The Battle of Midway (1987)
- 1943 Kai (1988)
- 1941: Counter Attack (1990)
- 19XX: The War Against Destiny (1996)
- 1944: The Loop Master (2000)
- 1942: Joint Strike (2008)
- 1942: First Strike (2010)

=== NMK's WW2 horizontal shoot 'em up series ===
- P-47: The Phantom Fighter (1988)
- USAAF Mustang (1990)
- P-47 Aces (1995)
- P-47 Aces Mk. II (2022)

=== The Strikers 1945 series ===
- Strikers 1945 (1995)
- Strikers 1945 II (1997)
- Strikers 1945 Plus (1999)

=== Art In Games' AirAttack series ===
Alternate reality; mobile-focused series

- AirAttack HD (2010) (Delisted 2021)
- AirAttack 2 (2015)

=== The World Witches Series ===
Aka Strike Witches. Alternate reality franchise.

- Strike Witches: Silver Wings (2010)
- World Witches: United Front (2020) (Delisted 2023)

=== The Azur Lane series ===
Alternate reality franchise

- Azur Lane (2017) (mobile)
- Azur Lane Crosswave (2019) (third-person shooter)

=== Other shoot 'em up games ===
- Beach-Head (1983) (multi-genre)
- U-boat (1983) (aka. U-Boat 26)
- Spitfire (1989)
- Ghost Pilots (1991)
- Sky Aces 2 (2013) (mobile)
- Air Strike: WW2 Fighters Sky Combat (2017)
- Aircraft Evolution (2018)
- Until the Last Plane (2021) (multi-genre)
- 1941 AirAttack: Airplane Games (2024) (mobile)

== Third-person shooters ==
- Iron Tank: The Invasion of Normandy (1988) (aka. Great Tank)
- The Last Soldier (1994)
- Medal of Honor: Infiltrator (2003)
- The Outfit (2006) (Multi-genre)
- Uprising 44: The Silent Shadows (2012) (multi-genre)
- Foxhole (2017) (multi-genre)
- Brass Brigade (2019) (multi-genre)
- Extraktion 1943 (TBA. 2025?)
- Frontline Fury - Trenches, Mud & Blood (TBA, 2026?)
- Wolfhound (TBA, 2026?) (alternate reality)

== Survival games ==
- UBOAT (2019) (multi-genre)
- WW2: Bunker Simulator (2022)

== Military simulations ==
Also known as 'Milsims'.

=== Arma 3 ===
- Arma 3 Creator DLC: Spearhead 1944 (2023)

=== Other military simulations ===
- Project Reality: BF2 (2005)
- Iron Front: Liberation 1944 (2012)
- Post Scriptum (2018)
- Medic: Pacific War (2023) (Multi-genre)
- Resolve (TBA, abandoned?)
- Beasts of Steel (TBA, 2026?) (Multi-genre)

== Massive multiplayer online first-person shooter (MMOFPS) ==
=== Cornered Rat Software's WWII Online series ===
- WWII Online: BlitzKrieg (2001) (aka. World War II Online: Battleground Europe. Multi-genre.)
- WWII Online: Chokepoint (TBA, 2025?)

=== Other MMOFPS games ===
- Heroes & Generals (2013)
- Enlisted (2021)

== Stealth games ==
=== The Death to Spies series ===
- Death to Spies (2007)
- Death to Spies: Moment of Truth (2008)

=== Other stealth games ===
- Castle Wolfenstein (1981)
- Beyond Castle Wolfenstein (1984)
- Into the Eagle's Nest (1986)
- The Great Escape (1986)
- Escape from Colditz (1991)
- Prisoner of War (2002)
- The Great Escape (2003)
- Airborne Troops: Countdown to D-Day (2005)
- Pilot Down: Behind Enemy Lines (2005)
- Velvet Assassin (2009)
- The Saboteur (2009)
- World War II: Underground (TBA, 2025?)

== Construction and management simulations ==
Construction simulations:

=== DeGenerals S.A.'s series ===
- Tank Mechanic Simulator (2020) (Multi-genre)
  - Tank Mechanic Simulator – First Supply DLC (2022)
- Tank Squad (2023) (Multi-genre)

Different developers:

- Tank Mechanic Simulator VR (2022) (Multi-genre)

=== PlayWay S.A.'s various constructors range ===
- Project Wunderwaffe (2022)
- WW2 Rebuilder (2023)
  - WW2 Rebuilder: Germany Prologue (2022)

=== Other construction simulations ===
- Sprocket (2021, EA) (Multi-genre)
- Ultimate Admiral: Dreadnoughts (2023) (Multi-genre)
- Ground Of Aces (2025, EA)

Management simulations:

=== The Warship Girls series ===
- Warship Girls (2012)
- Warship Girls R (2016)

=== The Kantai Collection series ===
Online/mobile games:

- Kantai Collection (2013)
- KanColle Kai (2016)
- KanColle Android (2016)

=== Other managerial simulations ===
- Until the Last Plane (2021) (Multi-genre)
- Aircraft Carrier Survival (2022) (Multi-genre)
- Radio Commander: Pacific Campaign (TBA, 2025?)
- War Mechanic (2025) (alternate history)
- Task Force Admiral - Vol.1: American Carrier Battles (TBA. 2030?)

== Tank simulators ==
=== Loriciel and Futura's WW2 sims series ===
- Sherman M4 (1989) (aka. Sherman M-4)
- D-Day (1992) (Multi-genre)

=== The Panzer Elite series ===
- Panzer Elite (1999)
  - Panzer Elite: Special Edition (2001)
- Panzer Elite Action: Fields of Glory (aka. First Battalion) (2006)
- Panzer Elite Action: Dunes of War (2007)

=== Enterbrain's Panzer Front series ===
- Panzer Front (2000)
  - Panzer Front bis. (2001) (JP-only update)
- Panzer Front Ausf.B (2004)

=== Digital Fusion Inc.'s series ===
- M4: Operation Tiger Hunt (2002)
- Panzer Killer! (2007)

=== Graviteam's various series ===
- Steel Fury – Kharkov 1942 (2007)
- Achtung Panzer: Kharkov 1943 (2009)
- Graviteam Tactics: Operation Star (2011) (aka. Achtung Panzer: Operation Star)
  - 4 unique content expansions (2014)
- Graviteam Tactics: Mius Front (2016)
  - 25+ expansions (2016 to 2020's)
- Tank Warfare: Tunisia 1943 (2017)
  - 4 DLC expansions (2017–2018)

=== Atypical Games' WW2 sims range ===
- Battle Supremacy (2014) (Multi-genre)
- Infinite Tanks WW2 (2021)

=== XDevs Ltd's WW2 MMO range ===
- Grand Tanks: WW2 Tank Games (2017) (1st game)
- Tank Force: Online Shooter Game (2017) (2nd game)
- Battle Tanks: Legends of World War II (2019)

=== DeGenerals S.A.'s series ===
- Tank Mechanic Simulator (2020) (Multi-genre)
  - Tank Mechanic Simulator – First Supply DLC (2022)
- Tank Squad (2023) (Multi-genre)

Different developers:

- Tank Mechanic Simulator VR (2022) (Multi-genre)

=== SP Games' WWII Tanks series ===
- WWII Tanks: Battlefield (2021)
- Tank Commander: Battlefield (2022)
- WWII Tanks: Forgotten Battles (2023)

=== Other tank simulators ===
- Sands of Fire (1989)
- M4: Sherman Tank Simulator (1992)
- Across the Rhine (1995) (Multi-genre)
- iPanzer '44 (1998)
- Panzer Commander (1998)
- WWII: Tank Battles (2006)
- WWII Battle Tanks: T-34 vs Tiger (2007)
- World of Tanks (2009)
- War Thunder (2012) (Multi-genre)
- War Machines: Tanks Battle Game (2016)
- Tank Battle Heroes (2018) (Subtitle: Esports War. Alternate reality.)
- IL-2 Sturmovik: Tank Crew - Clash at Prokhorovka (2020) (Standalone expansion to IL-2 Sturmovik: Great Battles series)
- Hell Let Loose (2021) (Multi-genre)
- Sprocket (2021, EA) (Multi-genre)
- World War: Tank Battle (2022)
- War Tank Machine Battle Vehicle Simulator - FWWWMTRD (Initials) (2023)
- WWII Tanks Battle - WW2HTMS (Initials) (2023)
- Steel Aces (2024)
- Sherman Commander (2026) (Multi-genre)

== Naval simulators ==
=== Digital Illusions' naval sim series ===
- PT-109 (video game) (1988)
  - PT Boat Simulator (1994) (Remake of PT-109)

=== Loriciel and Futura's WW2 sims series ===
- Advanced Destroyer Simulator (1990)
- D-Day (1992) (Multi-genre)

=== Conflict Analytics' Action Stations! group ===
- Action Stations! (video game) (1990)
  - Action Stations! - Scenario Utility Disk (1991) (Amiga add-on)

=== Evil Twin Artworks' Victory at Sea series ===
- Victory At Sea (2014)
- Victory At Sea Pacific (2018)
- Victory at Sea Atlantic - World War II Naval Warfare (2025)

=== Other naval simulators ===
- Destroyer (video game) (1986)
- Wolfpack (video game) (1990)
- Dreadnoughts Data Disk: Bismarck (1992 Amiga add-on for Dreadnoughts (video game))
- Task Force 1942 (1992) (aka. Task Force 1942: Surface Naval Action in the South Pacific. Multi-genre.)
- Destroyer Command (2002)
- PT Boats: Knights of the Sea (2009)
  - PT Boats: South Gambit (2010) (Standalone add-on of 2009 PT Boats title)
- Naval Assault: The Killing Tide (2010)
- War Thunder (2012) (Multi-genre)
- World of Warships (2015)
- Sea of Battle (2019)
- Ultimate Admiral: Dreadnoughts (2023) (Multi-genre)
- Aircraft Carrier Survival (2022) (Multi-genre)
- Boat Crew (2022. EA.)
- Destroyer: The U-Boat Hunter (2023)
- Battleship Command (TBA, 2027?)

== Submarine simulators ==
=== Digital Illusions' sub sim series ===
- Gato (video game) (1984)
- Sub Battle Simulator (1987)

=== MicroProse's Silent Service series ===
- Silent Service (1985)
- Silent Service II (1990)

=== Deadly Games' U-Boat Macintosh series ===
- U-boat (video game) (1994)
- U-Boat II: Drumbeat (1995)

=== The Silent Hunter series ===
- Silent Hunter (1996)
  - Silent Hunter Patrol Disk (1996)
  - Silent Hunter Patrol Disk #2 (1996)
  - Silent Hunter: Commander's Edition (1997)
- Silent Hunter II (2001)
- Silent Hunter III (2005)
  - Silent Hunter III: Gold Edition (2007)
- Silent Hunter 4: Wolves of the Pacific (2007)
  - Silent Hunter 4: Wolves of the Pacific – U-Boat Missions (2008)
- Silent Hunter V: Battle of the Atlantic (2010)

=== Magitech's U-Boat Commander series ===
Mobile games:

- U-Boat Commander (2009)
- U-Boat Commander II (2014)

=== CodeKnitters' Silent Depth series ===
- Silent Depth 3D Submarine Simulation (2016)
- Silent Depth 2: Pacific (TBA. 2024/2025.)

=== Other submarine simulators ===
- Submarine Commander (1982)
- Hunter-Killer (1983) (aka. U-Boat Hunt)
- Hunter Killer (video game) (1989)
- Das Boot: German U-Boat Simulation (1990) (aka. Das Boot is Missing)
- Grey Wolf: Hunter of the North Atlantic (1994)
- UBOAT (2019) (Multi-genre)
- Wolfpack (2019)

== Flight simulators ==
=== MicroProse's WW2 flight sim range ===
==== Sid Meier's Ace series ====
- Hellcat Ace (1982)
- Spitfire Ace (1982)

==== The B-17 Flying Fortress series ====
- B-17 Flying Fortress (video game) (1992) (First main title)
- B-17 Flying Fortress: The Mighty 8th (2000) (Second main title)
  - B-17 Flying Fortress : The Mighty 8th Redux (2024. EA.) (Remake)
- B-17 Flying Fortress The Bloody 100th (TBA) (Third main title)
- The Mighty Eighth VR (TBA)

==== MicroProse's other WW2 flight sim titles range ====
- 1942: The Pacific Air War (1994)
- European Air War (1998)

=== Lucasarts' Air Combat series ===
- Battlehawks 1942 (1988)
- Their Finest Hour: The Battle of Britain (1989)
  - Their Finest Missions: Volume One (1989)
- Secret Weapons of the Luftwaffe (1991)
  - P-38 Lightning Tour of Duty (1991)
  - P-80 Shooting Star Tour Of Dut (1991)
  - He 162 Volksjäger Tour of Duty (1991)
  - Do 335 Pfeil (1991)
- Secret Weapons Over Normandy (2003)

=== The Air Warrior series ===
- Air Warrior (1988)
- Air Warrior II (1997)
- Air Warrior III (1997)

=== Deadly Games' Bomber 3 series ===
- Bomber (video game) (1989) (aka. Bomber III: Flak Alley)
  - Bomber 3 (2024) (Digital rerelease by MicroProse)

=== Sierra's Aces series ===
- Aces of the Pacific (1992)
- Aces over Europe (1993)

=== Rowan Software's WW2 flight sim series ===
- Reach for the Skies (1993)
- Overlord (1994)
- Rowan's Battle of Britain (2000)

Other developers' titles:

- Battle of Britain II: Wings of Victory (2005)
  - Air Battles: Sky Defender (2007) (Arcade remake of Rowan's Battle of Britain)

=== Microsoft's Combat Flight Simulator series ===
- Microsoft Combat Flight Simulator (1998)
- Microsoft Combat Flight Simulator 2: WWII Pacific Theater (2000)
- Microsoft Combat Flight Simulator 3: Battle for Europe (2002)

=== The WarBirds series ===
- WarBirds (1995)
- WarBirds II (1999)
- WarBirds III (2002)

=== The Aces High series ===
MMO flight sims:

- Aces High (2000)
- Aces High II (2003)
- Aces High III (2016)

=== InterActive Vision's WW2 flight sim series ===
- Beyond Pearl Harbor: Pacific Warriors (2000) (aka. Pacific Warriors: Air Combat Action)
- Dogfight: Battle for the Pacific (2003) (aka. Pacific Warriors II: Dogfight)
- Red Skies Over Europe (2004)
- Iron Aces: Heroes of WWII (2006)
- WWII Battle Over Europe (2008)

=== IL-2 Sturmovik series ===
- IL-2 Sturmovik (2001)
- IL-2 Sturmovik: Forgotten Battles (2003)
  - IL-2 Sturmovik: Forgotten Battles – Ace Expansion Pack (2004)
- Pacific Fighters (2004)
- IL-2 Sturmovik: 1946 (2006)
- IL-2 Sturmovik: Birds of Prey (2009)
- Wings of Prey (2009)
- IL-2 Sturmovik: Cliffs of Dover (2011)
- IL-2 Sturmovik: Great Battles (2013)
- IL-2 Sturmovik: Cliffs of Dover – Blitz Edition (2017)

=== MAUS Software's WW2 flight sims ===
- Pearl Harbor: Strike at Dawn (2001)
- Battle of Europe (2005)

=== G5 Software's Red Shark series ===
Alternate history series:

- Red Shark (2002)
- Red Shark 2 (2005)

=== City Interactive's Combat Wings series ===
- World War II: Pacific Heroes (2004)
- Combat Wings (2005)
- Combat Wings: Battle of Britain (2006)
- Combat Wings: The Great Battles of World War II (2012)
- Dogfight 1942 (2012)
  - Dogfight 1942: Russia Under Siege (2012) (1st DLC)
  - Dogfight 1942: Fire Over Africa (2012) (2nd DLC)

=== Na.p.s. Team's WW2 flight sim series ===
- Flying Squadron (2003)
- WWII: Battle Over the Pacific (2006)
- Iron Wings (2017)

=== Ubisoft's various series ===
- Heroes of the Pacific (2005)
- Blazing Angels: Squadrons of WWII (2006)
- Blazing Angels 2: Secret Missions of WWII (2007)
- Heroes over Europe (2009)

=== The Air Conflicts series ===
- Air Conflicts: Air Battles of World War II (2006)
- Attack on Pearl Harbor (2007)
  - Pearl Harbor Trilogy – 1941: Red Sun Rising (2010) (Remake of 2007 Attack on Pearl Harbor title)
- Air Conflicts: Aces of World War II (2009)
- Air Conflicts: Secret Wars (2011)
- Air Conflicts: Pacific Carriers (2012)

=== Home Net Games' Warplanes series ===
- Warplanes: WW2 Dogfight (2018)
- Warplanes: Online Combat (2020) (Mobile)
- Warplanes: Battles over Pacific (2022) (VR)

=== Other flight simulators ===
- B-17 Bomber (video game) (1982)
- Spitfire 40 (1985) (aka. Spitfire 40: A Flight Simulation Program)
- Ace of Aces (video game) (1986)
- Wings of Fury (1987)
- Hellcats Over the Pacific (1991)
- D-Day (1992) (Multi-genre)
- Dogfight: 80 Years of Aerial Warfare (1993) (aka. Air Duel: 80 Years of Dogfighting)
- Pacific Strike (1994)
- Fighter Ace (1997)
- Jane's WWII Fighters (1998)
- Luftwaffe Commander (1999)
- Fighter Squadron: Screamin' Demons Over Europe (1999)
- Iron Aces (2000)
- Airfix: Dogfighter (2000)
- Pearl Harbor: Zero Hour (2001)
- Jane's Attack Squadron (2002)
- Allied Ace Pilots (2006)
- B-17: Fortress in the Sky (2007)
- Digital Combat Simulator (2008)
- WWII Aces (2008)
- Strike Witches: Blitz in the Blue Sky – New Commander Struggles! (2009) (Alternate reality)
- Airstrike Eagles of World War II (2011)
- Birds of Steel (2012)
- Damage Inc. Pacific Squadron WWII (2012)
- War Thunder (2012) (Multi-genre)
- World of Warplanes (2013)
- WW2: Wings of Duty (2014)
- Sky Gamblers: Storm Raiders (2015)
- Flying Tigers: Shadows Over China (2017)
- Iron Wings (2017)
- Kamikazes: Battle of the Philippine Sea (2017)
- Wings of Steel (2018) (Mobile)
- War Dogs : Air Combat Flight S (2019) (Mobile)
- Aviators (2024) (Free. Multi-genre.)
- Vincemus - Air Combat (2024)
- Combat Pilot (TBA. 2027?)

== Multi-type simulators ==
=== Lesta Studio's Pacific Storm series ===
- Pacific Storm (2005) (Multi-genre)
- Pacific Storm: Allies (2007) (Multi-genre)
- Pacific Storm Pack (2009) (Compilation of 2 unique P.S. titles)

=== Eidos' Battlestations series ===
- Battlestations: Midway (2007)
  - Battlestations: Midway - Iowa Mission Pack (2007) (DLC)
- Battlestations: Pacific (2009)
  - 3 content DLC packs (2009)

=== Sierra's Aces series ===
- Aces of the Pacific (1992)
  - Aces of the Pacific: Expansion Disk – WWII: 1946 (1992)
- Aces Over Europe (1993)
- Aces of the Deep (1994)
  - Aces of the Deep: Expansion Disk (1995)
  - Command: Aces of the Deep (1995)

=== Other multi-type simulators ===
- WWII Online: BlitzKrieg (2001) (aka. World War II Online: Battleground Europe. Multi-genre.)
- The Outfit (2006) (Multi-genre)
- War Thunder (2012) (Multi-genre)
- Battle Supremacy (2014) (Multi-genre)
- War on the Sea (2021)
- Victory Banner (TBA, 2026?) (Multi-genre)
- Brass Rain (June 6, 2027)

== Role-playing games ==
- Another War (2002)
  - Weird War: The Unknown Episode of World War II (2003) (Aka. Another War 2. English release cancelled.)
- Grom: Terror in Tibet (2003)
- Combat Elite: WWII Paratroopers (2005)
- Strike Witches: Kiseki no Rondo (2015)

== Tactical role-playing games ==
- Operation Darkness (2007) (alternate reality)
- Warsaw (2019)
- Broken Lines (2020) (alternate history)
- Burden of Command (2025)

== Real-time tactics games ==
=== Great Naval Battles Games ===
- Great Naval Battles: North Atlantic 1939–1943 (1992)
  - Great Naval Battles: North Atlantic 1939–1943 – Super Ships of the Atlantic (1993)
  - Great Naval Battles: North Atlantic 1939–1943 – America in the Atlantic (1993)
  - Great Naval Battles: North Atlantic 1939–1943 – Scenario Builder (1993)
- Great Naval Battles Vol. II: Guadalcanal 1942–43 (1994)
- Great Naval Battles Vol. III: Fury in the Pacific, 1941–1944 (1995)
- Great Naval Battles Vol. IV: Burning Steel, 1939–1942 (1995)
- The Complete Great Naval Battles: The Final Fury (Incl. Great Naval Battles Vol. V: Demise of the Dreadnoughts 1914–18) (1996)

=== The Close Combat series ===
- Close Combat (1996)
- Close Combat: A Bridge Too Far (1997)
  - Close Combat: Last Stand Arnhem (2010) (Remake based on CC 2 (1997) & CC: The Longest Day (2009))
- Close Combat III: The Russian Front (1998)
  - Close Combat: Cross of Iron (2007) (Remake of CC 3)
- Close Combat IV: Battle of the Bulge (1999)
  - Close Combat: Wacht am Rhein (2008) (Remake of CC 4)
- Close Combat: Invasion: Normandy (2000)
  - Close Combat: The Longest Day (2009) (Remake of CC 5 (2000))
- Close Combat: Panthers in the Fog (2012)
- Close Combat: Gateway to Caen (2014)
- Close Combat: The Bloody First (2019)

=== The Sudden Strike series ===
Nashi Igry LLC's Counter Action series

- Counter Action (1997)
  - Protivostoyanie: Opalyonnyj sneg (1998)
  - Protivostoyanie: Voennaya Hronika (1999) (Russian-only compilation)
- Sudden Strike (2000)
  - Sudden Strike Forever (2001) (expansion pack)
  - Protivostoyanie 3: Vtoroe dyhanie (2002)
- Sudden Strike 2 (2002)
  - Hidden Stroke: APRM (2003) (unofficial expansion)
  - Sudden Strike: Resource War (2004) (stand-alone expansion)
  - Hidden Stroke 2: APRM (2005) (stand-alone expansion)
- Sudden Strike 3: Arms for Victory (2007)
  - Sudden Strike: The Last Stand (2010) (stand-alone expansion)
- Sudden Strike 4 (2017)
  - Four mini add-ons (2017-2019)
- Sudden Strike 5 (2026)

=== The Commandos series ===
- Commandos: Behind Enemy Lines (1998)
- Commandos: Beyond the Call of Duty (1999)
- Commandos 2: Men of Courage (2001)
  - Commandos 2 – HD Remaster (2020)
- Commandos 3: Destination Berlin (2003)
  - Commandos 3 - HD Remaster (2022)
- Commandos: Origins (2025)

=== JTS/WDS' Naval Campaigns series ===
(John Tiller Software/Wargame Design Studio)

- Naval Campaigns series
  - 4 episodes (2003–2022) (Guadalcanal & Midway were 1st published by HPS Simulations.)

=== Panther Games' Command Ops series ===
- Airborne Assault: Red Devils Over Arnhem (2002)
- Airborne Assault: Highway to the Reich (2003)
- Airborne Assault: Conquest of the Aegean (2006)
- Command Ops: Battles from the Bulge (2010)
  - Command Ops: Highway to the Reich (2012) (Expansion with content from 1st 2 AA titles)
  - Command Ops: Battles for Greece (2013) (Expansion)
- Command Ops 2 (2015)
  - 7 volume expansions (2015)

=== The Squad Assault series ===
- G.I. Combat: Episode 1 – Battle of Normandy (2002)
- Eric Young's Squad Assault: West Front (2003)
- Squad Assault: Second Wave (2005)

=== The Blitzkrieg series ===
- Blitzkrieg (2003)
  - Blitzkrieg: Burning Horizon (expansion pack) (2004)
  - Blitzkrieg: Rolling Thunder (expansion pack) (2004)
  - Blitzkrieg: Green Devils (expansion pack) (2005)
  - Blitzkrieg: Iron Division (Blitzkrieg Anthology exclusive expansion pack) (2005)
- Blitzkrieg 2 (2005)
  - Blitzkrieg 2: Fall of the Reich (2006) (Expansion)
  - Blitzkrieg 2: Liberation (2007) (Expansion)
- Blitzkrieg 3 (2015)

=== The Afrika Korps series ===
Used Digital Reality Software's Walker 2 engine.

- Desert Rats vs. Afrika Korps (aka. Afrika Korps vs. Desert Rats) (2004)
- D-Day (2004)
- 1944: Battle of the Bulge (aka. No Surrender: Battle of the Bulge) (2005)
- Moscow to Berlin: Red Siege (aka. Mockba to Berlin) (2006)

=== InterActive Vision's Chain of Command series ===
- Chain of Command (2004) (aka. To Serve and Command)
- Chain Of Command: Eastern Front (2005)

=== The Codename: Panzers series ===
- Codename: Panzers Phase One (2004)
- Codename: Panzers Phase Two (2005)
- Rush For Berlin (2006)
  - Rush For the Bomb (2007) (Expansion)

=== The Men of War series ===
- Soldiers: Heroes of World War II (2004)
- Silent Heroes: Elite Troops of WWII (2005)
- Faces of War (2006)
- V tylu vraga: Diversanty 2 (2006)
- V tylu vraga 2. Bratya po oruzhiyu (2007)
- V tylu vraga: Diversanty 3 (2008)
- Men of War (2008)
- Men of War: Red Tide (2009)
- Men of War: Assault Squad (2011)
- Men of War: Condemned Heroes (2012)
- Men of War: Assault Squad 2 (2014)
- Assault Squad 2: Men of War Origins (2016)
- Soldiers: Arena (2019) (aka. Men of War II: Arena. Cancelled in 2021.)
- Men of War II (2024)

=== 1C's Theatre of War series ===
- Theatre of War (2007)
- Theatre of War 2: Africa 1943 (2009)
  - Theatre of War 2: Centauro (2009) (Expansion)
- Theatre of War 2: Kursk 1943 (2010)
  - Theatre of War 2 – Battle for Caen (2010) (Expansion)

=== URB Games' Mud and Blood series ===
- Mud and Blood 2 (2008) (Online)
- Mud and Blood 3 (2017) (Online)
- Skirmish Line (2019) (Fan-made tribute to MaB series)
- Mud and Blood Steam (2021, EA) (Offline remaster of MaB 2)

=== Destructive Creations' WW2 RTT range ===
- War Mongrels (2021)
- 63 Days (2024)

=== Digitalmindsoft's Gates of Hell series ===
Spiritual successor to the Men of War series:

- Call to Arms – Gates of Hell: Ostfront (2021) (Expansion to Call to Arms (2018))
  - Call to Arms – Gates of Hell: Talvisota (2022) (1st DLC expansion)
  - Call to Arms – Gates of Hell: Scorched Earth (2022) (2nd DLC expansion)
  - Call to Arms – Gates of Hell: Liberation (2023) (3rd DLC expansion)
  - Call to Arms – Gates of Hell: Airborne (2024) (4th DLC expansion)
  - Call to Arms – Gates of Hell: Finest Hour (2025) (5th DLC expansion)

=== Other real-time tactics games ===
- D-Day (1992) (Multi-genre)
- Offensive (1996)
- Muzzle Velocity (1997)
- Firefight (aka. Firefight - WW2) (1998)
- Fortress Europe: The Liberation of France (2001)
- WarCommander (2001)
- World War II: Panzer Claws (aka. Frontline Attack: War Over Europe) (2002)
- World War II: Frontline Command (2003)
- Panzer Claws II (2004)
- Great Battles of WWII: Stalingrad (2004)
- Super Army (2005)
- Frontline: Fields of Thunder (2007)
- Panzer Tactics DS (2007)
- Talvisota: Icy Hell (2007)
- World War II: General Commander (2008) (2009 digital release by Matrix Games)
- Order Of War (2009)
- Warfare 1944 (2009) (Con Artist Games)
- Achtung Panzer Operation Star (2011)
- Uprising 44: The Silent Shadows (2012) (Multi-genre)
- SIEGE: World War II (2018) (mobile)
- Final Assault (2019) (VR)
- Road to Valor: WW II (2019) (mobile)
- Maneuver Warfare (2020)
- Partisans 1941 (2020)
- AB 1943 mod (2021) (For Armored Brigade (2018))
- Classified France '44 (2024)
- Red Glare (2024)
- Sumerian Six (2024) (alternate reality)
- Battlefield Commander WWII (2025. EA.)
- Grit and Valor - 1949 (2025) (alternate history)
- Panzer Strike (2025)
- Sherman Commander (2026) (Multi-genre)
- Platoon Commander (TBA, 2026?)
- Red Recon: 1944 (2026)

== Real-time strategy games ==
=== MicroProse's Command Series ===
- Crusade in Europe (video game) (1985) (aka. Crusade in Europe: The Strategic War Simulation)
- Decision in the Desert (1985)

=== The Empire Earth series ===
- Empire Earth (video game) (2001)
  - Empire Earth: The Art of Conquest (2002)
- Empire Earth II (2005)
  - Empire Earth II: The Art of Supremacy (2006)
- Empire Earth III (2007)

=== The Company of Heroes series ===
- Company of Heroes (2006)
- Company of Heroes: Opposing Fronts (2007)
- Company of Heroes: Tales of Valor (2009)
- Company of Heroes 2 (2013)
- Company of Heroes 2: Ardennes Assault (2014)
- Company of Heroes 3 (2023)

=== Lesta Studio's WWII titles range ===
- Pacific Storm (2005) (Multi-genre)
- Pacific Storm: Allies (2007) (Multi-genre)
- Aggression - Reign over Europe (2008)
- Cannon Strike (2009) (More real-time tactics than RTS)
- Pacific Storm Pack (2009) (Compilation of 2 unique P.S. titles)

=== The Steel Division series ===
- Steel Division: Normandy 44 (2017)
  - 2 Division Pack expansions (2017–2018)
- Steel Division 2 (2019)
  - 26 unique content expansions (2019–2022)

=== Other real-time strategy games ===
- Conqueror (1988)
- P.T.O. (1989)
- WW2 Air Force Commander (1993) (aka. Air Force Commander: WW II)
- Across the Rhine (1995) (Multi-genre)
- Empires: Dawn of the Modern World (2003)
- War Times (2004)
- Axis & Allies (2004)
- War Front: Turning Point (2007)
- Officers (2007)
- Spring: 1944 (2008) (Open-source)
- World War II Online: Battleground Europe (High Command) (2009)
- War Leaders: Clash of Nations (2009)
- R.U.S.E. (2010)
- Timelines: Assault on America (2013) (alternate history)
- Call of War (2015) (Online. PC port: Call of War: World War 2.)
- Hills Of Glory 3D (2015)
- Military Operations: Benchmark (2018)
- Radio General (2020)
- Attack at Dawn: North Africa (2022) (Multi-genre)
- World War Armies (2022) (Online on mobiles & PC)
- WWII Online: Chokepoint (TBA, 2025? EA.)
- Terrors of War (TBA, 2026? EA.)
- Victory Banner (TBA, 2026?) (Multi-genre)

== Turn-based strategy games ==
=== SSI's WW2 TBS series ===
See List of Strategic Simulations games.

- Computer Bismarck (1980)
- Fighter Command: Battle of Britain (1983)
- 50 Mission Crush (1984)

==== Gary Grigsby's TBS series ====
Grigsby's titles published by SSI. Check tagged name's page for list.

- 25 titles (1982-1997)

=== SSG's Carriers at War series ===
- Carriers at War 1941–1945: Fleet Carrier Operations in the Pacific (1984)
- Carriers at War (1992 video game) (DOS Remake)
  - Carriers at War: Construction Kit (1993) (Expansion)
- Carriers at War II (1993)
- The Complete Carriers at War (1996) (Compilation of prior & new content)
- Carriers at War (2007) (Second remake with Matrix Games)

=== Gary Grigsby's air combat wargame series ===
- U.S.A.A.F. - United States Army Air Force (1985)
- Battle of Britain (1999) (Turn-based strategy)
- Talonsoft's 12 O'Clock High: Bombing the Reich (1999)
- Gary Grigsby's Eagle Day to Bombing the Reich (2009) (Remake of BoB (1999) & 12 O'Clock High (1999))

=== SSG's various series ===
Battlefront's (1986) engine:

- Battlefront (1986 video game)
- Battles in Normandy (1987)
- Rommel: Battles for North Africa (1988)
- Panzer Battles (1989)

Decisive Battles of WWII series:

- Decisive Battles of WWII: Ardennes Offensive (1997)
- Decisive Battles of WWII Vol 2: Korsun Pocket (2003)
  - Decisive Battles of WWII: Across the Dnepr (2003) (Expansion)
- Decisive Battles of World War II: Battles in Normandy (2004)
- Decisive Battles of World War II: Battles in Italy (2005)
- Battlefront (2007 video game) (2007) (Namesake of 1986 version)
- Kharkov: Disaster on the Donets (2008)
  - Across the Dnepr: Second Edition (2010) (Expansion. Remake of 2003 namesake title.)

=== Atomic Games' various series ===
==== V for Victory series ====
- V for Victory: Battleset 1 - D-Day Utah Beach - 1944 (1991)
- V for Victory: Velikiye Luki (1992)
- V for Victory: Market Garden (1993)
- V for Victory: Victory Pak (1993) (Pack of 1st 3 unique V for Victory titles)
- V for Victory: Gold-Juno-Sword (1993)
- V for Victory: Commemorative Collection (1995) (Pack of all 4 unique V for Victory titles)

==== World at War series ====
A continuation of the V for Victory series:

- Operation Crusader (video game) (1994)
- World at War: Stalingrad (1994)
- D-Day: America Invades (1995)

=== The Koutetsu no Kishi series ===
- Koutetsu no Kishi (1991)
- Koutetsu no Kishi 2: Sabaku no Rommel Shougun (1994)
- Koutetsu no Kishi 3: Gekitotsu Europe Sensen (1995)

=== HPS Simulations' various series ===
- Tigers on the Prowl (1994)
- Panthers in the Shadows (1995)
- Tigers on the Prowl 2 (1996)

=== The Panzer General series ===
- Panzer General (1994)
- Allied General (1995)
- Pacific General (1997)
- Panzer General II (1997)
- Panzer General 3D Assault (1999)
- Panzer General III: Scorched Earth (2000)
- Panzer General Online (2013)
- Open General (2009) (Free closed-source version. First released version 0.1. Fully released after beta in 2013.)

=== The Steel Panthers series ===
- Steel Panthers (1995)
  - Steel Panthers: Campaign Disk (1996)
  - Steel Panthers: Campaign Disk #2 (1997)
- Steel Panthers II: Modern Battles (1996)
  - Steel Panthers II: Modern Battles – Campaign Disk (1996)
  - SPWW2 (stand-alone expansion) (1999)
- Steel Panthers III: Brigade Command 1939–1999 (1997)
- Steel Panthers: World at War (2000)

=== Big Time Software's Over the Reich series ===
- Over the Reich (1996)
- Achtung Spitfire! (1997)

=== Talonsoft's various series ===
==== Talonsoft's Campaign series ====
- East Front (1997)
  - East Front: Campaign CD 1 (1998)
- West Front (1998)
  - West Front: Operation Sea Lion (1999)
  - West Front: Battle Pack 1 (1999)
  - TalonSoft's West Front: Elite Edition (2000) (Compilation of West Front & WF: Battle Pack 1)
- East Front 2 (1999)
- Campaign Series: Europe in Flames (2000) (Partial compilation of some prior series titles)
  - East Front 2: Fall of the Reich (2001)
- Rising Sun (2000)
  - Rising Sun: Imperial Strike (2000)
  - TalonSoft's Rising Sun: Gold (2000)
- TalonSoft's World at War (2001) (Compilation of some prior bundles)
- John Tiller's Campaign Series (2007) (Compilation of prior series titles published by Matrix Games)

==== The Operational Art of War series ====
Early series titles between 1998-2000 published by Talonsoft. TOAW III (2006) was the last Talonsoft-developed series title.

- Norm Koger's The Operational Art of War Vol 1: 1939–1955 (1998)
  - Norm Koger's The Operational Art of War Vol 1: 1939-1955 - Battle Pack I Scenario Add-on Disk (1999)
- The Operational Art of War: Century of Warfare (2000) (Collection of 1st 2 TOAW full games & expansions)
- The Operational Art of War Vol 1: 1939-1955 - Elite★Edition (2000) (Compilation of 1st full TOAW game & expansion)
- The Operational Art of War Vol 1: 1939-1955 - Wargame of the Year Edition (2000) (Similar to Elite★Edition (2000) but with added scenarios)
- Norm Koger's The Operational Art of War III (2006) (First series title to be released by a different publisher, Matrix Games)
- The Operational Art of War IV (2017)

=== The Battle of Asia in World War II series ===
- Battle of Asia in World War II (1999)
- Battle of Asia in World War II: The Formosan connection (2004)
- Battle of Asia in World War II: The Great Raid (2008)
- Battle of Asia in World War II: Destination Tokyo (2012)

=== JTS/WDS' various series ===
(John Tiller Software/Wargame Design Studio's various series)

- Panzer Campaigns series
  - 26 episodes (1999–2021)
- Strategic War series
  - Total War in Europe: First Blitzkrieg (2005) (1st published by HPS Simulations. aka. Strategic War: The First Blitzkrieg.)
  - Total War in Europe: War on the Southern Front (2009) (1st published by HPS Simulations. aka. Strategic War: War on the Southern Front.)
- Panzer Battles series
  - 4 episodes (2016–2018)
- Squad Battles series
  - 6 episodes (2002–2010. 6 early WW2 episodes in series were 1st published by HPS Simulations.)

=== Boku Strategy Games' Combat Command series ===
- Combat Command 2: Danger Forward (2000)
- Combat Command 2: Desert Rats! (2001)
- Combat Command: The Matrix Edition (2011) (Updated compilation of prior 2 titles)

=== The Combat Mission series ===
- Combat Mission: Beyond Overlord (2000)
- Combat Mission: Barbarossa to Berlin (2002)
- Combat Mission Afrika Korps (2004)

=== The Strategic Command series ===
- Strategic Command: European Theater (2002)
  - Strategic Command: Gold (2006)
- Strategic Command 2: Blitzkrieg (2006)
  - Strategic Command 2: Weapons and Warfare Expansion (2007)
  - Strategic Command 2: Patton Drives East (2008)
- Strategic Command: WWII Pacific Theater (2008)
- Strategic Command: WWII Global Conflict (2010)
  - Strategic Command: WWII Global Conflict – Gold (2011)
- Strategic Command: WWII – War in Europe (2017)

=== IgorLab Software's Soldiers of Empires series ===
- Soldiers of Empires (2002)
- Soldiers of Empires 2 (2012)

=== VR Designs' various series ===
- Advanced Tactics: World War II (2007)
- Decisive Campaigns: The Blitzkrieg from Warsaw to Paris (2010)
- Advanced Tactics: Gold (2011)
- Decisive Campaigns: Case Blue (2012)
- Decisive Campaigns: Barbarossa (2015)
- Decisive Campaigns: Ardennes Offensive (2021)

=== Slitherine's Battle Academy series ===
- Battle Academy (2010)
  - 6 expansions (2010–2013)
- Battle Academy 2: Eastern Front (2014)
  - Battle Academy 2: Battle of Kursk (2015) (expansion)

=== The Unity of Command series ===
- Unity of Command (video game) (2011)
  - 2 DLC expansions (2012–2013)
- Unity of Command II (2019)
  - 5 content expansions (2020–2022)

=== The Panzer Corps series ===
- Panzer Corps: Wehrmacht (2011) (Remake of Panzer General)
  - 17 unique expansions (2011–2016)
- Panzer Corps: Gold Edition (2016)
- Panzer Corps 2 (2020)
  - 7 expansions (2020–2022)

=== Brian Kelly's WEGO series ===
- Desert War 1940-43 (2011) (Freeware online Java-based version. Shut down in 2016.)
- WEGO World War II: Desert War (2018) (Old name: Desert War 1940-1942)
- WEGO World War II: Stalingrad (2021)

=== The Order of Battle series ===
- Order of Battle: Pacific (2015)
- Order of Battle: World War II (2015) (free-to-play version of Pacific)
  - 17 DLC expansions (2016–2021)

=== Yobowargames' Battle Series ===
- Battle Series: Eastern Front – Operation Typhoon (2016) (aka. Moscow '41 on itch.io)
- Operation Fall Gelb – The Battle for France (2016) (Mobile only)
- Battle Series: Kursk – Battle at Prochorovka (2017)
- Battle Series: Eastern Front – Battle for Korsun (2018)
- Battle Series Pacific: Battle for Iwo Jima (2020)
- Battle Series: Eastern Front – KRIM: The War in the Crimea 1941–42 (2020)

=== Starni Games' various series ===
- Panzer Strategy (2018)

==== The Strategic Mind series ====
- Strategic Mind: The Pacific (2019)
- Strategic Mind: Blitzkrieg (2020)
- Strategic Mind: Spectre of Communism (2020)
- Strategic Mind: Fight for Freedom (2021)
- Strategic Mind: Spirit of Liberty (2023)

=== The WarPlan series ===
- WarPlan (Kraken Studios and Matrix Games) (2019)
- WarPlan Pacific (Kraken Studios and Matrix Games) (2021)
- WarPlan 2: World Conflict 1939-1945 (aka Total Victory: World Conflict 1939-1945) (2026)

=== Strategy Game Studio's series ===
- 6 episodes (2020's) (Based on actual, not fictional, scenarios)

=== Primarily mobile series: ===

==== Handygames' WWII mobile strategy games ====
- 1942: Deadly Desert (2004, reissued in 2016)
- 1941: Frozen Front (2005, reissued in 2013)

==== The Frontline: Games Series (Mobile) ====
- Frontline: Eastern Front (2019. Mobile only.)
- Frontline: Western Front (2019)
- Frontline: The Great Patriotic War (2019)
- Frontline: Panzer Blitzkrieg! (2020)
- Frontline: World War II (2021)
- Frontline: Panzer Operations! (2023. Mobile only.)
- Frontline: Panzers & Generals Vol. I (2023)
- Frontline: World At War (2024)
- Frontline: Assault Corps WW2 (2025)

==== 88 mm Games' series ====
Also as Shenandoah Studios. Same staff as the Frontline: Games Series firm.

- Battle of the Bulge (2012)
- Drive on Moscow: War in the Snow (2013)
- Frontline: Road to Moscow (2014)
- Frontline: The Longest Day (2014)

==== Wirraway Software's WW2 TBS series ====
- Pacific Fire (2019)
- Blitzkrieg Fire (2021)

=== Other turn-based strategy games ===
- Eastern Front (1941) (1981)
- Pacific War (1984) (ZX Spectrum)
- Europe Ablaze (1985) (aka. Europe Ablaze: The Air War Over England and Germany 1939–1945)
- Pearl Harbour (1985)
- Fire-Brigade: The Battle for Kiev - 1943 (1988)
- Air Raid Pearl Harbor (1990)
- Barbarossa (1992)
- Task Force 1942 (1992) (aka. Task Force 1942: Surface Naval Action in the South Pacific. Multi-genre.)
- The Battle of Britain 2 (1992) (aka. the Battle of Britain)
- Grandest Fleet (1994)
- T-34: The Battle (Polish Atari 8-bit game)
- Sgt. Saunders' Combat! (1995)
- Battleground: Ardennes (1995)
- Daisenryaku (Iron Storm) (1996)
- G.I. Combat: Episode 1 – Battle of Normandy (2002)
- Pacific War: Matrix Edition (2003)
- War in the Pacific: The Struggle Against Japan 1941–1945 (2004)
- For King and Country: Operation Victory (2005)
- War Plan Orange: Dreadnoughts in the Pacific 1922–1930 (2005)
- Air Campaigns of WWII: Defending the Reich (2006)
- World War II – Road to Victory (2008)
- Military History Commander Europe at War (2009)
- War in the Pacific: Admiral's Edition (2009)
- Legends of War (2011)
- Tank Operations: European Campaign (2013) (Multi editions: 2013, 2019, 2024)
- Pacific Fleet (2014)
- Panzer General X (2014) (Jeff Crouch's free version)
- Spymaster (2014. Mobile.)
- Atlantic Fleet (2015)
- Red Thunder (2016) (By digital Gameworks. Discontinued in 2018.)
- Hex of Steel (2020)
- Through the Darkest of Times (2020)
- Attack at Dawn: North Africa (2022) (Multi-genre)
- Scramble: Battle of Britain (2024. EA.)

== Turn-based tactics games ==
=== Microcomputer Games Inc.'s WW2 TBT series ===
Division of Avalon Hill. See List of Avalon Hill games.

- Under Fire! (1985) (aka. Under Fire!: A Simulation of Squad Level Combat in WWII.)

=== General Quarters Software's tactical naval wargame series ===
- Battleship Bismarck: Operation Rhine - May 1941 (1987)
- Midway: The Battle that Doomed Japan (1989)
- Action in The North Atlantic (1989)
- Air Raid Pearl Harbor (1990)
- The Great Marianas Turkey Shoot (1990)

=== Random Games' 1996-2000 Strategy Engine ===
- Soldiers at War (1998)
- Avalon Hill's Squad Leader (2000)

=== The Silent Storm series ===
- Silent Storm (2003)
- Silent Storm: Sentinels (2004)

=== The Panzer Command series ===
- Panzer Command: Operation Winter Storm (2006)
- Panzer Command: Kharkov (2008)
- Panzer Command: Ostfront (2013)

=== digital Gameworks' range ===
- Valkyrie: Crisis in Berlin 1944 (2016) (aka. 'Valkyrie'. Web/mobile app.)
- Peleliu: The Devil's Island (2019)
- Monuments Men: Ebensburg (2020) (Also turn-based RPG, but not much RPG)
- Murphy's Heroes Hurtgen Forest (2020)

=== The Armoured Commander series ===
- Armoured Commander (2017)
- Armoured Commander II (2021)

=== Other turn-based tactics games ===
- Wargame Construction Set II: Tanks! (1994) (FR wiki)
- Pathway to Glory (2004)
  - Pathway to Glory: Ikusa Islands (2005)
- Second Front (2023)
- The Troop (2023)
- Forgotten but Unbroken (2024)
- Headquarters: World War II (2024)
- Troop vs Troop (2026)
- Beasts of Steel (TBA, 2026?) (Multi-genre)

== Grand strategy games ==
=== KOEI's World War series ===
- P.T.O Pacific Theater of Operations (1989)
- Operation Europe: Path To Victory (1991)
- P.T.O Pacific Theater of Operations II (1993)
- Teitoku no Ketsudan III (1996) (Japanese-only. EN: The Admiral's Decision III.)
- P.T.O.: Pacific Theater of Operations IV (2001)

=== The Hearts of Iron series ===
- Hearts of Iron (2002)
- Hearts of Iron II (2005)
  - Hearts of Iron II: Doomsday (expansion pack) (2006)
  - Hearts of Iron II: Armageddon (expansion pack) (2007)
  - Hearts of Iron II: Iron Cross (expansion pack) (2010)
  - Arsenal of Democracy (2010)
  - Darkest Hour: A Hearts of Iron Game (Stand-alone expansion pack) (2011)
- Hearts of Iron III (2009)
  - Hearts of Iron III: Semper Fi (expansion pack) (2010)
  - Hearts of Iron III: For the Motherland (expansion pack) (2011)
  - Hearts of Iron III: Their Finest Hour (expansion pack) (2012)
- Hearts of Iron IV (2016)
  - 9+ major expansions & country pack DLCs (2016 to 2020's)

=== Slitherine's Commander at War series ===
- Commander: Europe at War (2007)
  - Commander: Europe at War - Grand Strategy Expansion (2009) (Expansion)
- Commander: Europe at War (TBA, 2025?) (Remake)

=== The Making History series ===
- Making History: The Calm & The Storm (2007)
  - Making History: The Calm & The Storm – Gold Edition (2008)
- Making History II: The War of the World (2010)
- Making History: The Second World War (2017)

=== The World Conqueror series ===
- World Conqueror 1945 (2011)
- World Conqueror 2 (2012)
- World Conqueror 3 (2015)
- World Conqueror 4 (2017)

=== Maestro Cinetik's Cauldrons of War series ===
- Cauldrons of War – Barbarossa (2020)
- Cauldrons of War – Stalingrad (2021)

=== Other grand strategy games ===
- Gary Grigsby's World at War (2005)
- Gary Grigsby's World at War: A World Divided (2006)
- Supreme Ruler 1936 (2014)
- Call of War (2015) (Online. PC port: Call of War: World War 2.)
- Fleet Commander: Pacific (2022)
- States of Power (2026)
- Battleplan (2026)

== Massive Multiplayer Online Tactical Strategy Game (MMOTSG) ==
- NavyField (2005)
- Blitz 1941 (2009)

== Digital board games ==
=== Command Simulations' board game conversion series ===
- Blitzkrieg at the Ardennes (1989)
- White Death (video game) (1989)

=== The Avalon Hill Game Company's Third Reich series ===
- Third Reich (1992) (aka. Computer Third Reich)
- Third Reich (1996) (DOS version)

=== The Axis & Allies series ===
- Axis and Allies (1994) (CD-i version)
- Axis & Allies (1998 video game) (turn-based strategy) (1998)
  - Axis & Allies: Iron Blitz (1999) (Updated edition)
- TripleA (2011) (Open-source game engine)
- Axis & Allies 1942 Online (2021)

=== The Conflict of Heroes series ===
- Conflict of Heroes: Awakening the Bear (2012)
  - Conflict of Heroes: Ghost Divisions (2013) (1st expansion)
  - Conflict of Heroes: Storms of Steel (2013) (2nd expansion)

=== Lock 'n Load Publishing's various series ===
- Mark H. Walker's Lock 'n Load: Heroes of Stalingrad (2014)
- Lock 'n Load Tactical Digital: Core Game (2020)
  - 15+ DLC expansions (2020 to 2020's)
- Tank On Tank Digital - West Front (2017)
  - Tank On Tank Digital - East Front Battlepack 1 (2017) (Expansion)
- Nations At War Digital Core Game (2020)
  - 6 DLC expansions (2020 to 2020's)

=== Bookmark Games' various series ===
- Arnhem: Airborne Assault (2015) (aka. Assault on Arnhem)
- Undaunted Normandy (2023, EA)

==== Valiant Defense series ====
- Pavlov's House (2021)
- Castle Itter: The Strangest Battle of WWII (2021)

=== Strategiae's Wars Across The World series ===
- Wars Across The World (2017)
  - Several expansions (2017 to 2020's)

=== Yobowargames' Valor & Victory series ===
- Valor & Victory (2021)
  - Valor & Victory: Stalingrad (2022) (1st DLC expansion)
  - Valor & Victory: Shield of Cholm (2022) (2nd DLC expansion)
  - Valor & Victory: Arnhem (2022) (3rd DLC expansion)

=== Other digital board games ===
- World War II: TCG (2014)
- Kards: The WWII Card Game (2019)
- Total Tank Generals (2023)
- Bolt Action (TBA, 2026?)

== See also ==
- Lists of video games
- Video game genres
