= Index of Windows games (U) =

This is an index of Microsoft Windows games.

This list has been split into multiple pages. Please use the Table of Contents to browse it.

Title	Released	Developer	Publisher
ÜberSoldier	2006	Burut	CDV Software
Uboat	2024	Deep Water Studio	PlayWay S.A.
UEFA Euro 2000	2000	EA Canada	EA Sports
UEFA Euro 2004	2004	EA Canada	EA Sports
UEFA Champions League 2006-2007	2007	EA Canada	EA Sports
UEFA Euro 2008	2008	EA Canada, HB Studios	EA Sports
UFO: Afterlight	2007	Altar Games	Cenega
UFO: Aftermath	2003	ALTAR Interactive	Cenega
UFO: Aftershock	2005	Altar Interactive	Cenega
UFO: Extraterrestrials	2007	Chaos Concept	Tri Synergy
U.F.O.s	1997	Artech Digital Entertainment	Corel Corporation, Hoffmann + Associates
Ultima IX: Ascension	1999	Origin Systems	Electronic Arts
Ultima Online	1997	Origin Systems, Electronic Arts	Electronic Arts
Ultima Online: The Second Age	1998	Origin Systems	Electronic Arts
Ultima V: Lazarus	2005	Team Lazarus	
Ultimate Race Pro	1998	Kalisto Entertainment	MicroProse
Ultimate Spider-Man	2005	Treyarch, Beenox, Vicarious Visions	Activision
Ultrakill	2020	Arsi "Hakita" Patala	New Blood Interactive
Unavowed	2018	Wadjet Eye Games	Wadjet Eye Games
The Uncertain: Last Quiet Day	2016	ComonGames	ComonGames
Uncle Henry's Playhouse	1996	Trilobyte	Trilobyte
Undefined Fantastic Object	2009	Team Shanghai Alice	Team Shanghai Alice
Under Ash	2001	Dar al-Fikr	Dar al-Fikr
Under Siege	2005	Afkar Media	Dar al-Fikr
Under the Waves	2023	Parallel Studio	Quantic Dream
Underlight	1998	Lyra Studios	Lyra Studios
Undertale	2015	Toby Fox	Toby Fox
Unexplored	2017	Ludomotion	Ludomotion
Unexplored 2: The Wayfarer's Legacy	2022	Ludomotion	Ludomotion
Universal Combat	2004	Derek Smart	3000AD
Universe at War: Earth Assault	2007	Petroglyph Games	Sega
Unreal	1998	Epic Games, Digital Extremes	GT Interactive
Unreal II: The Awakening	2003	Legend Entertainment	Infogrames
Unreal Tournament	1999	Epic Games, Digital Extremes	GT Interactive
Unreal Tournament 2003	2002	Epic Games	Infogrames
Unreal Tournament 2004	2004	Epic Games	Atari
Unreal Tournament 3	2007	Epic Games	Midway Games
Until Dawn	2024	Supermassive Games	Sony Computer Entertainment
Untitled Goose Game	2019	House House	Panic Inc.
Up	2009	Heavy Iron Studios	THQ
Uplink	2001	Introversion Software	Introversion Software
Urban Chaos	1999	Mucky Foot Productions	Eidos Interactive
Urban Jungle	2005	Urban Development	Autoklub Rijeka, Talented Programmers Association of Rijeka
Urban Legend in Limbo	2015	Twilight Frontier, Team Shanghai Alice	Twilight Frontier, Team Shanghai Alice
Urban Terror	2000	Silicon Ice Development/Frozen Sand, LLC	
Uru: Ages Beyond Myst	2003	Cyan Worlds	Ubisoft
