= U-boat (disambiguation) =

U-boat (German: U-Boot) is a German military submarine of World War I and II.

U-boat or U-Boot may also refer to:

== Games ==
=== Board games ===
- U-Boat (game), a board game published by Avalon Hill in 1959
- U-Boat (wargame), a board game published in 1977 by Tabletop Games

=== Video games ===
- U-boat (video game), a 1994 submarine simulation video game
- Uboat (video game), a 2024 submarine simulation video game

== Software ==
- Das U-Boot, computer software, a GNU GPL boot loader

== Transport ==
- U-boat, a nickname for the GE Universal Series of diesel locomotives built by General Electric
- Southern Railway's U and U1 class locomotives, nicknamed "U-boats"
- U-boat, an Australian class of interurban railcars, otherwise known as U sets
- U-boat, a nickname for the WAGR U Class steam locomotives built by the North British Locomotive Company in 1942

== Other ==
- Woody Woodmansey's U-Boat, an English rock band, formed in 1976.
- U-boot (cocktail), a cocktail made with vodka and beer
- "U Boat", a song on the album Kasabian by the band of the same name
