= Action Stations =

Action Stations may refer to:

- General quarters, or action stations, an announcement on a naval warship that all hands must prepare for battle
- Action Stations (film), a 1959 British/Spanish action drama film
- Action Stations!, with Toonattik, children's strand of the British breakfast TV station GMTV2
- Action Stations! (video game), 1990
- ActionStation, founded by Te Raukura O'Connell Rapira
- Action Stations, a novel in the Wing Commander series
- Action Stations, a series of books about military airfields by Bruce Barrymore Halpenny
- "Action Stations" (Oh, Doctor Beeching!), a 1997 television episode

== See also ==
- Battlestations (disambiguation)
