= WC4 =

WC4 may refer to:

- Wing Commander IV: The Price of Freedom
- WC4 asteroid
  - 1994 WC4, see 9083 Ramboehm
- WC4 star spectral type, see Wolf–Rayet star
- WC4, a parasport cycling classification, see C4 (classification)
- Dodge WC4, military light truck, see Dodge WC series
- World Conqueror 4, a mobile ww2 and cold war simulator.
