= World Conqueror 4 =

2017 turn-based strategy video game

- App icon
- Developer: EasyTech
- Publisher: EasyTech
- Platforms: Android, iOS, Microsoft Windows
- Release: August 24, 2017
- Genre: Turn-based strategy
- Mode: Single-player

World Conqueror 4 is a turn-based strategy video game developed and published by EasyTech. It was first released for iOS on August 24, 2017, and was subsequently released for other mobile platforms and Microsoft Windows. It is the fourth installment in the World Conqueror series and primarily portrays military conflicts of the 20th century, particularly those of World War II.

In the game, players command military forces and make decisions concerning the movement and actions of their units during turn-based battles. The game features several modes, including Scenario, Conquest, Legion, and Domination. Players can also recruit historical military commanders, represented as generals with their own abilities and skills.

A version of the game for Nintendo Switch, titled World Conqueror X, was released in March 2018.

== Gameplay ==
Gameplay example showing the strategic map

=== Core gameplay ===
World Conqueror 4 is played on a grid-based strategic map where players command military units and complete objectives through turn-based movement and combat. The game includes different types of military units, including infantry, tanks, artillery, naval units, and aircraft. Players can capture cities and other locations, develop their forces, and make use of technological upgrades and other systems to improve their military capabilities.

The game includes 50 countries, more than 200 military units, historical generals, technologies, medals, and other progression systems.

=== Game modes ===
The game features several game modes, each with different objectives and gameplay systems.

==== Scenario ====
Scenario consists of historical military campaigns and missions. Players are given strategic objectives to complete within a limited number of turns. The game includes more than 100 campaigns based on historical events, including the Battle of Dunkirk, Battle of Stalingrad, the North African campaign, and the Battle of Midway.

==== Conquest ====
Conquest allows players to select a country and participate in large-scale conflicts across a world map. Conquest scenarios include 1939 and 1943 during World War II, 1950 during the Cold War, and 1980 during the modern era. Players can adjust diplomatic relations, aid allies, declare war on other countries, develop cities, research technologies, produce military units, and attempt to expand their territory.

==== Legion ====
Legion allows players to build an army and deploy troops in exercises and Legion battles. The mode emphasizes the arrangement of troops and the use of generals, and also includes challenge operations.

==== Domination ====
Domination contains several long-term progression systems. Players can recruit and develop generals, promote their ranks, equip them with medals, complete tasks in cities, trade resources, construct wonders and landmarks, and research technologies that improve their military forces.

==== Frontier ====
Frontier features additional challenge-based content with its own missions, objectives, and rewards. It was added through a later update and expanded the game's content beyond its original campaigns.

==== Army Group ====
Army Group features large-scale battles involving opposing army groups. Later updates have added additional scenarios and difficulty levels to the mode.

==== Event ====
Event consists of additional challenges and historical battles introduced through updates. Events can have their own objectives, conditions, and rewards.

==== Legend ====
Legend consists of challenge missions associated with historical military formations. Later updates have added additional Legend missions and rewards.

=== Generals and military units ===
Players can recruit historical military commanders known as generals. Generals can be assigned to military units and provide abilities that affect their performance in combat. They can be promoted, given different skills, and equipped with medals.

The game includes military units covering different branches of warfare, including infantry, tanks, artillery, naval units, and aircraft. It also features Elite Forces, which provide specialized military units with additional capabilities.

The game includes biographies for its historical generals, providing additional information about the figures represented in the game.

=== Technology and progression ===
The game includes a technological research system covering different branches of military development, including the army, navy, air force, missiles, nuclear weapons, and space weapons. The original game description listed 175 technologies.

Other progression systems include medals, general development, city development, wonders, landmarks, and achievements. The original game description listed 30 wonders, 16 landmarks, and 50 achievements.

Players can also enable automatic combat, allowing the computer-controlled AI to command their forces instead of requiring every action to be performed manually.

== Development and release ==
World Conqueror 4 was developed and published by EasyTech, a Chinese video game developer specializing in historical strategy games. The game was first released for iOS and iPadOS on August 24, 2017. The initial Android release followed on October 14, 2017.

Following its initial release, World Conqueror 4 received numerous updates that expanded its content and gameplay systems. Later updates added new scenarios, Conquest eras, military units, generals, game modes, and progression features.

The game was later released for Microsoft Windows, expanding its availability beyond mobile platforms. A version for Nintendo Switch was released under the title World Conqueror X on March 8, 2018, in North America and Europe.

Development and support for World Conqueror 4 continued after its original release, with later updates adding new content and gameplay systems.

== Reception ==
World Conqueror 4 has received generally favorable reception from mobile players. As of September 2026, its Google Play listing has a rating of 4.7 out of 5 from more than 124,000 reviews, while its United States App Store listing has a rating of 4.7 out of 5 from around 20,000 ratings.

Players have praised the game's amount of content, replayability, and continued updates, while some reviews have criticized its in-app purchases and the difficulty of obtaining certain rewards.

The Nintendo Switch version, World Conqueror X, received more formal critical coverage and holds a score of 74 out of 100 on Metacritic based on six critic reviews. Reviews praised its strategic gameplay and amount of content, while noting that some of its mechanics could be difficult for new players to learn.

== See also ==
- Turn-based strategy
- World War II video games
- EasyTech
