= Dogfight 1942 =

2012 video game

- Cover art on the Xbox 360 Marketplace
- Developer: City Interactive Games
- Publisher: City Interactive Games
- Director: Jakub Majewski
- Producers: Łukasz Hacura; Wojciech Borczyk; Jakub Duda
- Designers: Tomasz Kowalski; Marcin Rybiński
- Programmers: Łukasz Hacura; Jacek Kujawski
- Series: Combat Wings
- Platforms: Microsoft Windows; PlayStation 3 Xbox 360
- Release: X360/PS3: WW: September 5, 2012; Windows (Steam): WW: September 21, 2012
- Genres: Combat flight simulation Action
- Modes: Single-player, Multiplayer

Dogfight 1942 is a combat flight simulation action video game both developed and published by City Interactive Games. It was released on September 5, 2012 worldwide for Xbox 360 and PlayStation 3 and on September 21, 2012 worldwide for Windows via Steam.

The game is based on various battles taking place during World War II. It is the fifth and final game in the Combat Wings video game series.

== Gameplay ==
Throughout Dogfight 1942, players navigate through missions using controls designed to accommodate various skill levels, allowing for responsive maneuverability during combat encounters. Tactics such as evasion, targeting, and precise aiming play a crucial role in overcoming adversaries in intense aerial engagements. The game's missions cover a wide range of scenarios, from engaging in dogfights against enemy fighters to executing precision bombing runs on strategic targets, providing players with a diverse and immersive gameplay experience.

A screenshot from the game; attempting to land the plane on the ship

A screenshot from the game; with multiplayer via split-screen

As players progress through the game, they unlock new aircraft and upgrades, enhancing their combat capabilities and introducing additional strategic options. Whether upgrading to a more agile fighter or outfitting a bomber with heavier armaments, players can tailor their gameplay experience to suit their preferences. The computer opponents ensures that each mission presents a fresh challenge, requiring adaptability and strategic thinking from players to succeed.

In addition to its single-player campaign, Dogfight 1942 offers multiplayer modes, which are the Campaign Cooperative Mode, Survival Mode, and Dogfight Mode. These modes provide an opportunity for players to play in dogfights and cooperative missions. With its gameplay mechanics, and multiplayer modes, Dogfight 1942 appeals to both flight combat enthusiasts and those interested in World War II history.

=== Downloadable content ===
Dogfight 1942 has two add-on packs which are Russia Under Siege and Fire Over Africa.

==== Russia Under Siege ====
Russia Under Siege is the first add-on pack released for Dogfight 1942. The add-on pack was released on September 28, 2012, worldwide, for all platforms, and published by City Interactive Games. The add-on pack added the 'Eastern Winds' campaigns.

==== Fire Over Africa ====
Fire Over Africa is the second and last add-on pack released for Dogfight 1942. The add-on pack was released on October 5, 2012, worldwide, for all platforms, and published by City Interactive Games. The add-on pack added 'The Sands of Africa' campaigns.

== Development ==
There was supposed to be a Nintendo Wii version of the game, but got cancelled during development.

== Reception ==
Reception

Aggregate score
Aggregator	Score		
Aggregator	PC	PS3	Xbox 360
Metacritic	65/100	60/100	59/100

Review scores
Publication	Score		
Publication	PC	PS3	Xbox 360
4Players	N/A	N/A	68%
PlayStation Official Magazine – UK	N/A	6/10	N/A
Official Xbox Magazine (US)	N/A	N/A	5/10
GameWatcher	N/A	N/A	6/10
Gaming Age	N/A	B−	B−
Machinima	N/A	N/A	40/100

Dogfight 1942 received "mixed or average" reviews according to review aggregator Metacritic.

PlayStation Official Magazine - UK rated the PlayStation 3 version of the game 6/10, stating: "Dogfight 1942 is an arcade flightsim set during the Second World War. Unfortunately the missions are lacking variety. So you'd better let this one just fly by."

The Official Xbox Magazine (US) rated the Xbox 360 version of the game 5/10, stating: "Two offline pals can spend a pleasant afternoon eliminating A.I. flyboys in Dogfight Mode arenas, facing ceaseless waves in Survival Mode, or revisiting missions that allow for a co-op partner. But even those tepid charms feel too much like dull training flights."

== See also ==
- Combat Wings
