= Deadly Dozen =

2001 video game

- Developer(s): nFusion Interactive
- Publisher(s): Infogrames (original); Ziggurat Interactive (Reloaded)
- Platform(s): Windows; Nintendo Switch; PlayStation 4; Xbox One
- Release: November 2, 2001: Original; NA: November 2, 2001; EU: November 2001; Reloaded; Microsoft Windows; April 28, 2022; Nintendo Switch, PS4, Xbox One; Q3 2022
- Genre(s): Tactical shooter
- Mode(s): Single-player

Deadly Dozen is a 2001 World War II oriented squad-based first-person shooter video game developed by nFusion Interactive. The title refers to the famous World War II film The Dirty Dozen. As in the film, the main protagonists are military misfits sentenced to death or long term imprisonment who are given a chance to redeem themselves by going on dangerous missions. The game was followed by a sequel titled Deadly Dozen: Pacific Theater.

== Gameplay ==
The twelve characters have different specializations: sniper, demolition expert and so on. For every mission, the player selects four of European theater.

== Reception ==
Reception

Aggregate scores
Aggregator	Score
GameRankings	61.33%
Metacritic	56/100

Review scores
Publication	Score
GameSpot	7.1/10
GameSpy	60/100
GameZone	8.5/10
IGN	6.4/10
ActionTrip	50%

Deadly Dozen received mixed reviews from critics upon release. On Metacritic, the game holds a score of 56/100 based on 7 reviews, indicating "mixed or average reviews". On GameRankings, the game holds a score of 61.33% based on 12 reviews.

== Re-release and remaster ==
In July 2013, Tommo purchased many assets from Atari during their bankruptcy sale, including Deadly Dozen. The company later re-released it on Steam under their "Retroism" brand in 2015. By March 2020, the ownership of the title, alongside other Retroism games, was transferred over to the newly formed Ziggurat Interactive, who currently publish the game.

In January 2022, Ziggurat Interactive announced Deadly Dozen Reloaded, a remaster of the original game for PCs and consoles. It was released for the PC via Steam and GOG.com in April 2022. Nintendo Switch, PlayStation 4 and Xbox One versions were released in the later half of the year.
