= P.T.O. IV =

2001 video game

- Developer(s): Koei
- Publisher(s): Koei
- Platform(s): PC, PlayStation 2, PlayStation Network
- Release: Windows: JP: 2001; PlayStation 2: JP: March 28, 2002; NA: February 4, 2003; EU: March 11, 2004; PlayStation Network: NA: June 13, 2013
- Genre(s): Strategy
- Mode(s): Single-player

P.T.O. IV (Pacific Theater of Operations IV), released as Teitoku no Ketsudan IV (提督の決断IV) in Japan, is a 2001 World War II-themed strategy for the PlayStation 2 and PC produced by Koei. It focuses on naval combat in the maritime theaters of World War II, encompassing the Pacific Ocean, Mediterranean Sea, Atlantic Ocean, and Indian Ocean, with the option of playing as one of four major maritime powers of the time: Germany, Japan, the United Kingdom, or the United States. P.T.O. IV is the latest game in Koei's P.T.O. series.

== Gameplay ==
=== Modes ===
There are two modes of gameplay: Scenario and Campaign. The former involves fighting historic naval engagements as either the attacker or defender with the option to continue in campaign mode if certain conditions are met to emerge victorious. If the player starts with the latter, the objective is to achieve victory for their chosen nation and alliance by controlling as many of the 50 regions into which the world's oceans and sea lanes are divided into as possible. Campaigns start either with the initial outbreak of World War II in September 1939, or after the Japanese attack on Pearl Harbor in December 1941. If the player commands the Imperial Japanese Navy, he can choose whether to attack Pearl Harbor or not.

Campaigns occur in two phases: Strategic and Tactical. The Strategic phase involves long term planning of the campaign and deployment of forces. At the beginning of the month, objectives and progress towards meeting them are evaluated or set. If a given objective is met in a timely manner, additional money is earned by the player. Based on where the targeted region is located, at least a month is required to complete the objective. Commanders may be awarded with a Golden Anchor, a Silver Anchor or a certificate as a reward for their actions during these invasions. Resources can be allocated towards ship and aircraft production, R&D, or to other allies as material assistance, which may or may not be reciprocated in kind the next turn depending on the ally's resources. Ships can be organized into fleets and transferred to regions. Aircraft can be assigned to airfields or aircraft carriers, or airfields can be built in regions.

An enemy fleet is sighted during a battle in the Tactical Phase.

After this phase is complete, the Tactical phase occurs. This involves ship movement from region to region and combat if opposing fleets encounter each other at sea (opposing fleets are moving from adjacent regions towards each other) or in a region when a fleet invades. For a naval battle, victory occurs if all the enemy's deployed ships are destroyed or retreat within 72 hours. For an invasion, victory for the attacker includes destroying or forcing all opposing enemy fleets to retreat and destroying all existing enemy airfields within 72 hours. If the attacker fails to do this even if all enemy ships are destroyed within the time limit, the defender still holds onto the territory and the invading fleet retreats back to the region it invaded from.

=== Naval powers ===
The player has the option of playing as one of four major World War II maritime powers: the United Kingdom or United States for the Allies, or Germany or Japan for the Axis. At the start of the game however, the player has the option of choosing allies, enabling the creation of alliances that did not exist such as Germany and the United States for example, to be played for the campaign.

Smaller naval powers such as the Royal Australian Navy, the Royal Canadian Navy, and the Regia Marina, are played by either the United Kingdom's Royal Navy or Germany's Kriegsmarine. The Soviet Navy and the French Navy do not appear as naval powers in either scenario.

=== Territory ===
Each power starts out with a certain set of territories depending on whether the campaign starts in 1939 or 1941. Some of the powers control territory that they actually did not at the time. For example, Germany's territory includes Libya and Ethiopia (both under Italian rule), the United States controls territories in the Caribbean Sea and South America (both independent), while the United Kingdom controls Canada and Australia (both Commonwealth). The focus of Campaign mode is to capture enemy territories while defending one's own, reducing the number of ports under enemy control to zero. Territories produce four types of resources: money, iron ore, oil, and aluminum for the power that controls them. Money is used to fund construction of ships and aircraft, and fund R&D of new technologies or ship and aircraft types. Iron ore is used for ship construction, oil is used by ships for movement, and aluminum is used for aircraft construction. Capturing territories thus increases the resources available to a player while denying their use to the enemy.

Each power has one home port, to which newly manufactured ships and aircraft are stationed upon completion. During the Strategic Phase, aircraft may be transferred to any region, while it takes ships or fleets several weeks to travel from region to region. There are also 14 key regions throughout the world which are vital strategic ports with repair facilities for ships. As not all ports have this capability, control of these key regions is crucial in order to maintain the fighting capabilities of one's fleet at sea with less turnaround time for ship repair when ships are damaged in combat. The invasion of a central naval port in itself however, does not guarantee the surrender of a naval power, and may require the entire surrounding region to be occupied before starting the invasion.

=== Ships ===
There are several types of warship available: battleships, battlecruisers, fleet aircraft carriers, light carriers, escort aircraft carriers, heavy cruisers, light cruisers, destroyers, and submarines. Materials cost and length of completion time varies with the battleships costing the most and thus taking the longest time to construct, with submarines being the cheapest and having the shortest turnaround time. Each power starts out with a certain number of ships of each type. More can be constructed, and existing types and new models can be upgraded and created when R&D in certain areas is developed. The game places emphasis on battleships while limiting the effectiveness of aircraft carriers, thus not reflecting the realities of World War II which saw the decline of the battleship and rise of the aircraft carrier as the dominant warship in naval warfare. Battleships however, may be sunk by either heavy gunfire from other vessels, or being bombed repeatedly by carrier and land based aircraft. The game also increases the effectiveness of submarines, enabling submarine fleets to dominate sea battles during the initial engagement.

Ships are organized into fleets, which can comprise up to 16 ships. Up to three fleets can be deployed by each power in battle, with up to 96 total ships committed to a battle. Fleets begin deployed in a column of two ships abreast with the strongest ships as the vanguard and the weakest in the rear. The deployment of fleets may cause problems during combat when a fleet becomes stuck and individual ships are unable to maneuver to redeploy (for example, due to a land obstacle), causing fragmentation of a fleet.

Another type of ship that can be constructed but not controlled is transports. These are used for transporting resources from territories to home ports. They can be interdicted by submarines.

=== Aircraft ===
The following types of aircraft are available: fighters, carrier fighters, bombers, carrier bombers, torpedo bombers, carrier torpedo bombers, scouts, and seaplanes. Each power starts out with a specific number of models of each type deployed to the territories under its control depending on when the campaign starts. Additional models or types can be built, and advanced designs and capabilities become available after completing R&D, for example jets and advanced radar.

Aircraft can be deployed to airfields in a territory or to aircraft carriers, although some larger ships like cruisers and battleships can carry seaplanes for scouting. Territories can hold up to three airfields, which must be constructed prior to basing aircraft there. Aircraft so based during an invasion act in a defensive role against the invading fleet(s) or enemy aircraft if deployed, and can be used to scout for enemy fleets during the day. After enemy fleets are found, the land-based aircraft will then sortie to bombing attacking vessels or fend off bomber attacks. Because one of the victory conditions of capturing a territory is destroying its existing airfields, a means of negating the effect of defending aircraft is to invade a territory at night when the aircraft are grounded and destroy the airfields before daylight if their locations are known. Only land-based flying boats can attack submarines. Effectively, during a daytime invasion, bombers can be sent to destroy both airfields and defending fleets, while fighters defend against enemy bombers.

=== Commanders ===
Each power has a set of historic naval officers and admirals, including Karl Dönitz and Erich Raeder for Germany, Louis Mountbatten and Andrew Cunningham for Britain, Isoroku Yamamoto and Chūichi Nagumo for Japan and Husband Kimmel and Chester Nimitz for the United States. Each commander may be assigned to various classes of warship from submarine to battleship in order to increase its effectiveness. Commanders are limited to which types of ship they command depending on their rank, thus officers of rear admiral rank and below may not be able to command a battleship and certain aircraft carriers until they are promoted. This can happen when the ship under their command performs well in battle. They can be killed in action if the ship they are on is destroyed in combat before they have the chance to transfer to another ship. Once a power is defeated, all the surviving commanders of that nation change allegiance and become controllable by whichever power defeated them, although they are all demoted to the rank of lieutenant commander.

== Reception ==
On release, Famitsu magazine scored the PlayStation 2 version of the game a 32 out of 40.
