= PT Boats: Knights of the Sea =

2009 video game

PT Boats: Knights of the Sea is a PC computer game by Akella. It is a simulation in which the player operates a PT Boat during World War II. In this game, the player can choose to control a ship, a group of ships, or to control specific crew members separately.
