= Combat Elite: WWII Paratroopers =

2005 video game

- Combat Elite: WWII Paratroopers box art
- Developer: BattleBorne Entertainment
- Publisher: SouthPeak Interactive
- Platforms: PlayStation 2, Xbox
- Release: November 21, 2005
- Modes: Single player, multiplayer

Combat Elite: WWII Paratroopers is a single player based top down action role-playing video game set in World War II. The game was released on November 21, 2005, in the US. It was published by SouthPeak Games and was developed by American studio BattleBorne Entertainment. The game was originally going to be published by Acclaim Entertainment, but the company went bankrupt and the game's release got delayed.

It is available for Xbox and PlayStation 2. A Windows version was planned, but cancelled. In addition, Combat Elite utilizes the Snowblind Studios engine, the same engine used for games such as Baldur's Gate: Dark Alliance II.

== Reception ==
Upon release, Combat Elite: WWII Paratroopers received mixed reviews. IGN gave it a rating of 5.5/10 citing its poor targeting system and primitive controls. It was given a 5.4/10 rating by GameSpot again citing primitive controls, poor aiming mechanism, and an imbalanced skill system. On Metacritic the game has a weighted average score of 54% based on reviews from 12 critics.
