= Panzer Front Ausf.B =

2004 video game

- PAL cover art
- Developer: Enterbrain
- Publisher: 505 Games
- Platform: PlayStation 2
- Release: JP: March 27, 2004; EU: March 2006; AU: May 6, 2006
- Genre: Vehicle simulation game
- Mode: Single-player

Panzer Front Ausf.B (German "Ausf." is an abbreviation of "Ausführung", meaning model or version) is a tank simulation game for the PlayStation 2 home console. Released in 2004, it is the third game in the Panzer Front franchise.

== Gameplay ==
Panzer Front Ausf.B lets the player fight as a tank commander in historic simulated tank battles. Each battle involves manoeuvring on a large battlefield, with varied terrain. Most battles involve over thirty units per side, ranging from infantry to tank platoons. The player pilots the lead tank in a formation of two to five tanks that can be separated into sub-units. The player can utilise variable zoom binoculars from the commander's hatch, or view the field using the vision devices from inside the tank and the aiming reticule. The main view is from outside the tank.

Most missions feature the ability to call in high-explosive or smoke artillery barrages and attacks from support aircraft. The player also has the option of changing to play the opposing force, and changing which unit he commands.

A scoreboard at the end of each mission displays enemy units killed and their corresponding points. This score will only be saved if the player and the allied units in his formation used the default unit and type of vehicle.

Each weapon, from machine gun to 88mm, has a different sound, recoil and ammunition types. The tanks also sustain realistic battle damage. Hits to the different areas of the tank, depending on armour type, range, angle and power of the gun, produce a different effect, such as track, gun, gun turret or mount damage. Individual crew members can be killed or wounded, affecting the operation of the tank. Engine damage effects the tank's speed, or can disable it altogether. A repair and reload area can be used to replace injured or killed crew, or to repair damaged tanks.

=== Vehicles ===
All of the vehicles in the game, especially the tanks, are based on actual units in service in 1940 and 1941. They include the Panzer III, the Cruiser MkIII, and the Matilda tank.

=== Missions ===
Except for one mission set during the 1940 German invasion of France, Panzer Front Ausf. B is mostly set in Libya during the early stages of World War II's Western Desert Campaign. Missions include the Italian Tenth Army's attempted breakout at Beda Fomm and the assault at Fort Capuzzo. Each mission allows the player to play one of the combatant sides, such as the Afrika Korps, Italian Tenth Army, Britain's Eighth Army, and the Australian 6th Division.

== Reception ==
Reception

Aggregate score
Aggregator	Score
Metacritic	58/100

Review scores
Publication	Score
Eurogamer	6/10
Famitsu	26/40
PlayStation Official Magazine – UK	2/10

The game received "mixed" reviews according to the review aggregation website Metacritic. In Japan, Famitsu gave it a score of one seven, one six, one seven, and one six for a total of 26 out of 40.
