= Unexplored =

Video game series

- Original Steam store art for the first game
- Developer: Ludomotion
- Publisher: Ludomotion
- Platforms: Windows, Switch, PlayStation 4, Xbox One, Xbox Series X/S
- Release: Unexplored; February 22, 2017 (Win); August 9, 2018 (Switch); February 19, 2019 (PS4); February 22, 2019 (Xbox One); Unexplored 2 May 27, 2022 (Win); June 3, 2022 (Xbox One, Series X/S); September 14, 2022 (PS4)
- Genres: Roguelike, action role-playing
- Mode: Single-player

Unexplored is a series of two roguelike video games developed and published by Ludomotion. The first game, Unexplored, was released in 2017. The second game, Unexplored 2: The Wayfarer's Legacy, was released in 2022.

== Gameplay ==
Unexplored games are roguelike action role-playing games. The first game's objective is to reach the deepest floor of the dungeon and retrieve the Amulet of Yendor. The second game's objective is to destroy the Staff of Yendor. The second game features 3D graphics as opposed to the first game's top-down 2D graphics.

== Release ==
After six months of early access, Unexplored was released for Windows on February 22, 2017. Linux and macOS versions were planned to be released in the first quarter of 2018, but as of November 2019, Linux and macOS versions were still unreleased. Three downloadable content (DLC) packs were released for the game. A Nintendo Switch port was released on August 9, 2018, in Europe and North America. PlayStation 4 port was released in North America and Europe in February 2019, along with Xbox One port. Switch and Xbox One ports were published by Digerati.

Unexplored 2 was announced at E3 2019's PC Gaming Show. A Fig crowdfunding campaign was launched at the same time. The game was launched in early access on June 21, 2021, followed by its full release in 2022 for Windows on May 27, for Xbox One and Xbox Series X/S on June 3, and for PlayStation 4 on September 14.

== Reception ==
Unexplored

Aggregate score
Aggregator	Score
Metacritic	64/100 (Switch); 67/100 (PS4)

Review scores
Publication	Score
Nintendo Life	8/10
Nintendo World Report	6.5/10

Unexplored 2

Aggregate score
Aggregator	Score
Metacritic	69/100 (PC)

Review scores
Publication	Score
Eurogamer	7/10
PC Gamer (US)	59/100
CD-Action	7/10
Multiplayer.it	8.5/10

Both Unexplored games received "mixed or average" reviews according to review aggregator Metacritic.

=== Unexplored ===
Waypoint wrote: "Unexplored's procedurally generated levels are dense with meaning, memory, and connection in a way that most other RL's [roguelikes] aren't". Rock Paper Shotgun also praised the procedural level design. Nintendo Life said that unlike Unexplored's "overly simplistic" artstyle, the "unusual approach to balancing combat and map generation" is its most memorable element. Nintendo World Report didn't like the game's combat and how the dungeon was procedurally generated. PC Gamer wrote that the game's randomly generated worldbuilding was "quietly revolutionary". PC Gamer nominated Unexplored for the best strategy game of 2017. Waypoint included the game among its best games of 2017. Dominic Tarason of Rock Paper Shotgun listed the game as one of the top three games of 2017, calling the procedural generation "a borderline-magical piece of code".

=== Unexplored 2 ===
CD-Action called Unexplored 2 ambitious and beautiful but criticized the story and lack of polish. Eurogamer complimented the graphics and soundtrack but did not appreciate the procedurally generated story. PC Gamer criticised the amount of bugs, calling the full release "too broken to interact with as intended". Rock Paper Shotgun liked the game's barter and permadeath systems, and artstyle though disliked the story and camera system.
