= Dogfight: Battle for the Pacific =

2003 video game

- Developer: InterActive Vision
- Publishers: EU: Midas Interactive Entertainment; NA: ValuSoft
- Platforms: Windows; PlayStation 2 PlayStation 3
- Release: 2003
- Genre: Simulation

Dogfight: Battle for the Pacific (known in Europe as Pacific Warriors II: Dogfight) is a 2003 video game from Midas Interactive Entertainment.

== Gameplay ==
In Pacific Warriors 2: Dogfight, players engage in a total of 50 missions—25 for each faction—featuring a mix of dogfights, bombing runs, and reconnaissance tasks. As they complete objectives, players earn performance-based points that can be used to upgrade their aircraft. One feature of the gameplay is the ability to switch planes mid-mission.

== Development ==
The game was announced in November 2003 and was showcased at E3 2004.

== Reception ==
Reception

Review scores
Publication	Score
4Players	73%
Jeuxvideo	11/20
PC Action	56%

The game sold over 200,000 copies for the PlayStation 2. By March 2008, the game sold 300,000 copies.
