= Bomber (video game) =

1989 video game

- Developer: Inline Design
- Publishers: Inline Design, Deadly Games
- Designer: Rene Vidmer
- Platform: Macintosh
- Release: 1989

Bomber, also known as Bomber 3 or Bomber III, is a combat flight simulation game developed and released in 1989 by Inline Design for the Macintosh.

== Plot ==
The player commands a B-17 crew to perform bombing missions over Europe during World War II, in which hazards include German fighter attacks, flak, and oxygen and heat becoming depleted, while victorious assignments provide rank and rating promotions. The game starts when the Base Commander's Headquarters assigns the player a bombing run. Upon successfully bombing 25 targets, the bomber returns home to the US and receives a medal.

== Gameplay ==
The player controls the pilot, co-pilot, bombardier, navigator, and gunners for the plane. As the bombardier, the player uses the included Photo Recon booklet (which is also the game's copy protection) to aim the bombsight over the landscape to locate the target seen in the photo, pressing the salvo button to release a bomb. When attacked by fighters, the player controls a gunner at one of the bomber's six gun positions each armed with twin 50-caliber machine guns. Personnel can be killed during a mission.

== Development ==
Bomber, also known by the full title of Bomber 3: Flak Alley, was developed by Inline Design using HyperCard as a software environment. Darryl Peck had started Inline Design with an old friend, intending the company to be a design firm for furniture and yachts. When he found out that a friend of his partner was finishing Bomber and intended to post it as sharewere, Peck says "I convinced him to let me publish it by saying that if we sold 5,000 copies we would have about $100,000 in return. He bought the proposal and off we went. Rather than start a new company, I used the Inline Design name we had already registered." Before long, Inline Design had sold over 10,000 copies of Bomber. Bomber was Inline Design's biggest selling title in 1991 but Inline Design decided to discontinue selling the game that year because Peck was a pacifist and he felt the game promoted violence; he wanted his business to succeed by publishing "entertaining, challenging, non-violent games."

=== Re-release ===
The game, titled Bomber 3, would be digitally rereleased by MicroProse for Windows 7 onwards on Steam in early 2020's. It was officially rereleased on Steam in January 23, 2024. However by then, the Steam client dropped support for a few older Windows operating systems before Windows 10.

== Reception ==
The Macintosh IIx (B&W) version of the game was reviewed in 1990 in Dragon #158 by Hartley, Patricia, and Kirk Lesser in "The Role of Computers" column. The reviewers gave the game 4 out of 5 stars. They stated that "Inline Design proves that HyperCard ... can be used as a software environment for commercially viable entertainment." They commented that Bomber combines digitized sound with realistic graphics, and "has the look and feel of real bomber missions. The Lessers concluded by stating: "Bomber is extremely enjoyable and is recommended for all Macintosh gamers."

Markus Dahlberg reviewed Bomber for Swedish magazine Datormagazin in 1994. Dahlberg felt that the game did not fulfill any sort of demand a player could expect from a modern game at that time, stating that he had never seen such a lousy game before. He commented that the graphics looked like they were made on a lunch break, and the cockpit looked like a miserable jumble where it would be hard to find which buttons to push. He noted that the game included headphones which hinted at the importance of sound in the game, but that the game's sound was completely inaudible. He ultimately lamented that no one should ever have to play such a miserable game, and felt bad for everyone who happened to own it.

Macworld inducted Bomber into its 1990 Game Hall of Fame in the Best Simulation category. Macworld called the game "a fascinating HyperCard re-creation of air warfare in the European theater of World War II" that alternated "periods of relative calm [...] with white-knuckled terror".
