= Panzer Front =

1999 video game

- European PlayStation cover art
- Developer: Enterbrain
- Publishers: JP: ASCII Entertainment; EU: JVC Music Europe; NA: Agetec, Inc.
- Platforms: PlayStation, Dreamcast
- Release: Dreamcast: JP: December 22, 1999; PlayStation: JP: December 22, 1999; EU: April 17, 2001; NA: September 10, 2001
- Genre: Tank combat simulation
- Mode: Single-player

Panzer Front (Japanese: パンツァーフロント, Hepburn: Pantsā Furonto) is a World War II tank simulation game first released in 1999 in Japan by Enterbrain for the PlayStation and Dreamcast game consoles.

== Gameplay ==
Players perform the role of a tank commander during the war using one of six fictional tanks. Battles are fought on various maps based on actual historical campaigns. During the game, the player can engage the enemy while calling in artillery barrages whenever they are available. Panzer Front takes a realistic approach, some enemies can kill the player's tank with one shot. Reinforcements are also available in some missions if allied tanks are lost.

=== Missions ===
Panzer Front has 25 missions, based on real events. Examples include the destruction of a British armored column in the Battle of Villers-Bocage, the US Army's defense against a ferocious German counterattack in Le Dezert, the defense of the Reichstag during the Battle of Berlin, and several based on the Battle of Kursk.

== Panzer Front bis ==
Panzer Front bis is an updated version of the original game, released for the Sony PlayStation in Japan on February 8, 2001. Bis (Latin for 'once more') features all of the game's tanks and missions, with additional tanks, ten scenarios (including one set during Operation Olympic), and a mission editor. It was due to be released in Europe in the middle of 2002, but JVC Music Europe, the UK publisher, shut down its video game branch before Bis could be converted and released.

== Reception ==
Reception

Aggregate score
Aggregator	Score	
Aggregator	Dreamcast	PS
GameRankings	N/A	68%

Review scores
Publication	Score	
Publication	Dreamcast	PS
Eurogamer	N/A	7/10
Famitsu	30/40	29/40
Official U.S. PlayStation Magazine	N/A	3.5/5
Play	N/A	80%

The PlayStation version received "average" reviews according to the review aggregation website GameRankings. In Japan, Famitsu gave it a score of 30 out of 40 for the Dreamcast version, and 29 out of 40 for the PlayStation version.

== See also ==
- Panzer Front Ausf.B
