= The Battle of Britain 2 =

1992 video game

- Developer: Deadly Games
- Publisher: Deadly Games
- Designer: Rene Vidmer
- Platforms: Macintosh, Windows, Windows 3.x
- Release: 1992 (Mac), 1998 (Win/Win 3.x)
- Genres: Simulation, Strategy

The Battle of Britain 2 is a 1992 video game published by Deadly Games.

== Gameplay ==
The Battle of Britain 2 is a game in which the player orders squadrons from the No. 11 Group RAF to defend Britain, commanding from the war room at Uxbridge. The game uses a plotting map and a tote-board system, and the player keeps track of observer reports on potential threats from radar and the ground.

== Reception ==
Alan Emrich reviewed the game for Computer Gaming World, and stated that "Don't miss out on The Battle of Britain 2 if you want a gaming distraction that is, at once, enjoyable, pleasant, easily learned, historical and 'lite.'"

Andrew Miller from Macworld commented that "even though the graphics and sound on The Battle of Britain [2] are not spectacular, I recommend the game. What it lacks in aesthetics it makes up for in strategy, historical insight, and entertainment."

Don Crabb for the Chicago Sun-Times said that "If you like war games and simulations, or even if you have never tried one before, The Battle of Britain 2 deserves your attention. It's a superb, thinking persons computer game that proves you don't need arcade graphics to have fun playing computer games."
