= Battlestations =

Battlestations or Battle stations may refer to:

- General quarters, or battle stations, an announcement aboard a naval warship to alert the crew to prepare for battle
- Battlestations!, a Star Trek: The Original Series novel by Diane Carey
- Battle Stations, a 1997 video game
- Battlestations: Midway, a 2007 video game
  - Battlestations: Pacific, a 2009 sequel
- Battle Stations (album), an album by Eddie "Lockjaw" Davis and Johnny Griffin
- "Battlestations", a 1986 song by Wham!, one of the b-sides of "The Edge of Heaven"
- Battle Stations a 1944 short film narrated by Ginger Rogers
- Battle Stations (film), a 1956 American war film featuring John Lund
