= Tigers on the Prowl =

1994 video game

- Developer: HPS Simulations
- Publisher: HPS Simulations
- Platform: MS-DOS
- Release: NA: 1994
- Genres: Simulation, strategy

Tigers on the Prowl is a 1994 video game by American studio HPS Simulations for MS-DOS.

== Gameplay ==
Tigers on the Prowl is a tactical wargame involving combat on land in World War II.

== Reception ==
Reception

Review score
Publication	Score
PC Gamer (US)	65%

The Wargamer wrote: "Without a doubt ToP is the most realistic simulation of tactical WW II combat yet made. It is also a lot of fun." Games Domain said: "This is an excellent game, but one that may appeal primarily to the dedicated wargamer." In 1996, Computer Gaming World declared Tigers on the Prowl the 148th-best computer game ever released. The magazine's wargame columnist Terry Coleman named it his pick for the 11th-best computer wargame released by late 1996.
