= Combat Wings =

World War II-based combat flight simulation game series

- Genre: Combat flight simulation
- Developer: City Interactive Games
- Publisher: City Interactive Games
- Platforms: Microsoft Windows; Xbox 360; PlayStation 3
- First release: World War II: Pacific Heroes; April 6, 2004
- Latest release: Dogfight 1942; September 21, 2012

Combat Wings is a World War II combat flight simulation video game series both developed and published by City Interactive Games.

The first game was World War II: Pacific Heroes, which was released on April 6, 2004, in Europe for Microsoft Windows and the latest game from the series is Dogfight 1942, which was released on September 5, 2012, worldwide, for the Xbox 360 and PlayStation 3. The Windows version was released a few weeks later.

Combat Wings in total has four games from the franchise. The first being World War II: Pacific Heroes. The others include Combat Wings (2005), Combat Wings: Battle of Britain (2006), Combat Wings: The Great Battles of World War II (2012) and Dogfight 1942 (2012).

Release timeline
| 2004 | World War II: Pacific Heroes |
| 2005 | Combat Wings |
| 2006 | Combat Wings: Battle of Britain |
2007–2011
| 2012 | Combat Wings: The Great Battles of World War II |
| 2012 | Dogfight 1942 |

== Release history ==
| Title | Released | Platform | Based on | |
|---|---|---|---|---|
| World War II: Pacific Heroes | 2004 | Microsoft Windows | Pacific War | World War II |
| Combat Wings | 2005 | Microsoft Windows | Battle of Midway | World War II |
| Combat Wings: Battle of Britain | 2006 | Microsoft Windows | Battle of Britain | World War II |
| Combat Wings: The Great Battles of World War II | 2012 | PlayStation 3, Microsoft Windows, Xbox 360 | Various battles during World War II | World War II |
| Dogfight 1942 | 2012 | PlayStation 3, Microsoft Windows, Xbox 360 | Various battles during World War II | World War II |

== World War II: Pacific Heroes ==
World War II: Pacific Heroes is a combat flight simulation action-arcade video game developed and published by City Interactive Games (it was City Interactive Sp. z o.o. at the time). It was released on April 6, 2004, in Europe, and on September 22, 2004, in North America for Microsoft Windows. The game takes place in the Pacific War during World War II. The game is also the first game in the Combat Wings series.

=== Gameplay ===
A screenshot from the game; in a dogfight

Throughout the game, players assume the roles of pilots navigating various missions across the Pacific Ocean. The gameplay focuses on fast-paced action and diverse environments, aiming to recreate the intensity of aerial combat during this historical period.

Players have access to a range of aircraft from the era, including a Vought F4U Corsair and a Douglas SBD Dauntless, each with unique characteristics and weapons. Whether engaging in dogfights against enemy planes or carrying out bombing missions, players must demonstrate precision and skill to succeed. The game's controls are designed to be user-friendly, allowing for immersive aerial maneuvers such as dives and evasive actions.

A screenshot from the game; in an anti-air mission

As players progress, they encounter increasingly challenging missions and face off against formidable adversaries, including enemy aircraft and naval vessels. The dynamic artificial intelligence ensures that encounters remain unpredictable, requiring adaptability and strategic thinking. Additionally, the game features various mission objectives, from reconnaissance tasks to large-scale aerial battles, providing a diverse gameplay experience.

=== Reception ===
Alex Navarro at GameSpot rated the game 5.5/10, stating that "Ultimately, for as amusing of a brief distraction that Pacific Heroes can be, it's probably not worth the price of admission." Killy at Jeuxvideo.com rated the game 6/20, stating that the game is "graphically unconvincing and almost meaningless."

== Combat Wings ==
Combat Wings is a combat flight simulation action video game both developed and City Interactive Games (it was City Interactive Sp. z o.o. at the time). The game was released on November 21, 2005, in Europe, and on July 29, 2008, in North America for Microsoft Windows. The game released on Steam on May 4, 2020. The game takes place in the Battle of Midway during World War II. The game is also the second game in the Combat Wings series.

=== Gameplay ===
A screenshot from the game from the cockpit while in a dogfight

Players pilot various aircraft across different war theaters, experiencing missions from both Allied and Axis perspectives. The game offers a variety of mission types, including dogfights, bombing runs, and reconnaissance tasks, providing diverse gameplay.

A screenshot from the game where the plane is landing; from an outer perspective

In Combat Wings, players engage in aerial combat against enemy fighters, bombers, and ground targets. The game's controls aim to be accessible to players of different skill levels, while still offering depth for those seeking a challenge. Throughout the game, players unlock new aircraft and upgrades to customize their loadouts and improve their performance.

The campaign mode features a storyline unfolding across multiple missions, immersing players in the historical context of World War II. Authenticity is maintained through historically inspired events and locations. Combat Wings aims to provide an engaging portrayal of aerial combat during this significant historical period.

== Combat Wings: Battle of Britain ==
Combat Wings: Battle of Britain is a combat flight simulation action video game both developed and City Interactive Games (City Interactive Sp. z o.o. at the time). It was released on September 18, 2006, in Europe, December 30, 2006, in North America, and on February 6, 2008, in Australia for Microsoft Windows. It was released on Steam on October 14, 2009. The game takes place in the Battle of Britain during World War II. The game is also the third game in the Combat Wings series.

=== Gameplay ===
A screenshot from the game where the plane is taking off

Players assume the role of a Royal Air Force pilot tasked with defending Britain against German Luftwaffe attacks. The game offers a variety of missions, including dogfights, bombing runs, and reconnaissance tasks, set against the backdrop of this historic conflict.

A screenshot from the game where the plane is in a dogfight

In Combat Wings: Battle of Britain, players have access to a selection of aircraft from both Allied and Axis forces, each with its own unique characteristics and weaponry. The game features intuitive controls suitable for players of different skill levels.

Throughout the campaign, players navigate through enemy formations, evade fire, and engage in aerial combat to fulfill mission objectives. As players progress, they unlock new aircraft and upgrades, enhancing their combat abilities and providing customization options. Multiplayer modes are also available for online aerial battles.

=== Reception ===
Gord Goble at IGN rated the game 7/10, stating that "Combat Wings: Battle of Britain suffers from a lack of quality control and depth. And it definitely won't satisfy those who prefer a simulation style of air combat. Nevertheless, it's the best flying game we've seen from this developer to date (January 2009) and a spirited look at WWII dogfighting that should bring a smile to anyone with an itchy trigger finger and a hankering for action."

PC Games rated the game 60/100, stating that "the boring missions are too easy even for beginners, the embarrassing and constantly repeated macho sayings from the pilots make radio communication torture."

== Combat Wings: The Great Battles of World War II ==
Combat Wings: The Great Battles of World War II is a combat flight simulation action video game both developed and published by City Interactive Games. The Japanese versions of the game were published by Kaga Create. The game was released on February 29, 2012, in Europe, March 27, 2012, in North America, March 29, 2012, in Australia, and on February 14, 2013, in Japan for the Xbox 360, Microsoft Windows, and PlayStation 3. The game is also the fourth game in the Combat Wings series.

=== Gameplay ===
A screenshot from the game; all enemy planes are marked

A screenshot from the game; eliminating an enemy plane

In the game, players assume the role of a pilot flying different aircraft across different theaters of the conflict. These missions include tasks like convoy escort, target destruction, and aerial combat against enemy planes.

Players have access to a selection of aircraft, each with its own unique characteristics and weaponry. The game's controls aim to be accessible to players of different skill levels while still providing depth for those seeking a more challenging experience. Throughout the campaign, players must utilize strategic thinking and piloting skills to complete mission objectives.

The gameplay revolves around completing missions, each presenting its own set of challenges and objectives. The game features AI to keep missions unpredictable and engaging. As players progress, they unlock new aircraft, upgrades, and abilities, allowing for customization and improving combat effectiveness. Multiplayer modes also enable players to compete in aerial battles with others online.
