= Rowan's Battle of Britain =

2000 video game

- Developer: Rowan Software
- Publisher: Empire Interactive
- Platform: Windows
- Release: EU: 8 December 2000; NA: 29 January 2001
- Genre: Combat flight simulator
- Modes: Single player, Multiplayer

Rowan's Battle of Britain, sometimes known simply as Battle of Britain, is a World War II era combat flight simulation game set during the Battle of Britain in 1940.

== Gameplay ==
The combat flight simulation has both RAF and opposing Luftwaffe forces featuring over 800 square miles (2,100 km^{2}) of sky and hundreds of aircraft.

== Reception ==
Reception

Aggregate score
Aggregator	Score
Metacritic	79/100

Review scores
Publication	Score
AllGame	2.5/5
Computer Games Strategy Plus	3.5/5
Computer Gaming World	4.5/5
Eurogamer	7/10
GameSpot	8.4/10
GameStar	73%
GameZone	6.5/10
IGN	7.7/10
Next Generation	5/5
PC Gamer (US)	80%

The game received "generally favourable reviews" according to the review aggregation website Metacritic. Samuel Bass of NextGen said of the game, "Detailed, beautiful, and polished to the nth degree, this is the WWII sim we've all been waiting for."

== Sequels ==
The game was remade twice, first in 2005, as Battle of Britain II: Wings of Victory by Shockwave Productions, Inc., and again in 2007, as Air Battles: Sky Defender by Wild Hare Entertainment, a modified version of the above game with a more arcade-style gameplay.

== Legacy ==
On end-of-support of the game, the source code of the game was released by Rowan Software under the "Empire Interactive License" in 2001. Following the source code release, a group from the game's community took up the support and produced several unofficial patches until 2005.
