= World War II: TCG =

2014 video game

- Developer: FrozenShard Games
- Publisher: FrozenShard Games
- Designer: Marc Tormo
- Programmer: Christian Gascons
- Platforms: Microsoft Windows; Mac OS; Android; iOS
- Release: March 6, 2014 (iOS); June 19, 2014 (Android); February 23, 2019 (Steam)
- Genre: Digital collectible card game
- Modes: Single player campaign; Player vs player; Historical missions; Raids

World War II: TCG is a free-to-play, online turn-based digital collectible card game developed and published by FrozenShard Games. The game was released on March 6, 2014, for iOS, June 19, 2014 for Android, and February 23, 2019 for Steam. It is the first release from FrozenShard Games, which was founded on September 24, 2012 by three former Blizzard Entertainment employees and was created following a successful Kickstarter campaign.

World War II: TCG is based on the events of World War II.

== Gameplay ==
As of 2015, World War II: TCG allows players to join five different distinct factions including: The Germans, Russians, Japanese, Americans, and the British. Players can enjoy the game in a variety of ways by playing in a single player mode, online co-op, an online PvP mode, and even a cross-platform PvP mode so players can play each other on a variety of different consoles.

World War II: TCG contains four major types of cards in: Units, Items, Orders, and Commands. Each card type is based on World War II technology, such as the Japanese A6M Zero plane and Tiger tank.

The game has a unique resource system in which the player starts with three action points that can be used to play cards from their first turn onwards. Players can use their action points to promote units and become more powerful; a card that starts as an infantry unit gains more attack power, health, and abilities after being promoted. If a card is destroyed, it returns to the player's deck and may be drawn again in its promoted state.

And though World War II: TCG had a good fan base behind it, as of October 3, FrozenShard announced the official end of the game itself. Due to the fact that Gamesparks, the backend provider of FrozenShard, ultimately decided to end their services. And with no other viable options/services to be able to support the game, FrozenShard in turn ultimately decided to shut down the game.

== Expansions ==
Release dates in chronological order:

- Sea Lords - Added ships and submarines (80+ new cards), May 11, 2017
- Stronghold - Added structures (60+ new cards), May 28, 2018
- Outbreak - Crafting option (80+ new cards), May 2, 2019
- War Machine - Swap cards option (130+ new cards), October 14, 2019
- Defiance - Gameplay and UI rework (120+ new cards and leaders feature), December 7, 2020

== Reception ==
Joseph Luster of the Warfare History Network website called World War II: TCG a "fun new take on WWII Combat" and said it was "surprisingly likable". He highlighted the fact that "cards can be examined to get a better idea of which one would be appropriate for a particular play. But, the simpler battles can typically be won mainly by being aggressive and coming out strong with cards that will, ideally, overpower the ones your enemy puts on the field".

Rob Thomas of 148Apps.com reviewed an early version of the game and stated that, "While an enjoyable enough experience most of the time, World War II: TCG sports a few serious weaknesses." Thomas criticized how "random chance" sometimes resulted in "infuriating unfairness," along with the game's lack of "fundamental concepts" from other digital trading card games. While Thomas viewed the tutorial at the start of the game as lengthy, he noted that there was a lack of explanations for many new elements introduced after the tutorial. He concluded the review by saying that, "Free to play doesn't excuse many design mistakes that make this collectible card game feel fresh out basic training."

World War II: TCG was a finalist in Gamelab 2014's "Best Debut" section. FrozenShard Games was selected by Asus as the winner of the "Innovation Prize", where the game was presented in Bilbao's Guggenheim museum for the Fun&Serious Game Festival.
