= Midway: The Battle that Doomed Japan =

1989 video game

- Developer: General Quarters Software
- Publisher: General Quarters Software
- Platforms: Apple II, MS-DOS
- Release: 1989
- Genre: Wargame

Midway: The Battle that Doomed Japan is a computer wargame published in 1989 by General Quarters Software.

== Gameplay ==
Midway: The Battle that Doomed Japan is a game in which the Battle of Midway is simulated at the operational level. The game features all of the surface ships used by the Navy during World War II, and the play map covers from mainland Japan to Pearl Harbor.

== Publication history ==
Midway: The Battle that Doomed Japan was the first product from California-based company General Quarters Software.

== Reception ==
Lt. H. E. Dille reviewed the game for Computer Gaming World, and stated that "Overall, General Quarters Software has succeeded in providing war gamers an inexpensive way to strive for a miracle. Midway is a fine achievement for the fledging firm, offering challenging (if not balanced) game play, smooth operation, adequate graphics, and a very strong computer opponent. It is certainly worth the purchase price."
