= Deadly Dozen: Pacific Theater =

2002 video game

- Developer(s): nFusion Interactive
- Publisher(s): Infogrames
- Platform(s): Windows
- Release: NA: November 11, 2002
- Genre(s): Tactical shooter
- Mode(s): Single-player, multiplayer

Deadly Dozen: Pacific Theater is a World War II oriented squad-based first-person shooter developed by nFusion Interactive and is the sequel to Deadly Dozen. It was released in 2002 for Microsoft Windows.

== Gameplay ==
Unlike its predecessor, it is set in the Pacific theater and most of its levels take place in large outdoor areas. Other than regular infantry combat, the game also features drivable vehicles.

== Reception ==
Reception

Aggregate scores
Aggregator	Score
GameRankings	78.40%
Metacritic	78/100

Review scores
Publication	Score
GameSpot	8.3/10
GameSpy	72/100
GameZone	9/10
IGN	8.1/10

Deadly Dozen: Pacific Theater received positive reviews from critics upon release, in contrast with the previous game's mixed reception. On Metacritic, the game holds a score of 78/100 based on 8 reviews, indicating "generally favorable reviews". On GameRankings, the game holds a score of 78.40% based on 10 reviews.

Deadly Dozen was a runner-up for GameSpot's annual "Best Budget Game on PC" award, which went to Serious Sam: The Second Encounter.

== Re-release and remaster ==
In July 2013, Tommo purchased many assets from Atari during their bankruptcy sale, including Deadly Dozen: Pacific Theater. The company later re-released it on Steam under their "Retroism" brand in 2015. By March 2020, the ownership of the title, alongside other Retroism games, was transferred over to the newly formed Ziggurat Interactive, who currently publish the game.
