= Battle of Britain II: Wings of Victory =

2005 video game

- Developers: Shockwave Productions (BoB II); Wild Hare Entertainment (ABSD)
- Publishers: Tri Synergy, GMX Media(BoB II); Wild Hare Entertainment (ABSD)
- Platform: Microsoft Windows
- Release: EU: 26 August 2005; NA: 12 September 2005; AU: 2006; Air Battles: Sky Defender: NA: 15 March 2007
- Genre: Combat flight simulation
- Mode: Single player

Battle of Britain II: Wings of Victory is a Windows-based World War II combat flight simulator created by Shockwave Productions (currently known as A2A Simulations) and released in 2005. It is a remake of Rowan's Battle of Britain. A cut-down version without the campaign was released in 2007, titled Air Battles: Sky Defender.

== Gameplay ==
Battle of Britain II can be played either as a flight simulator or as a strategy game, or both combined. The player assumes the role of pilot or a commander of the British RAF or the German Luftwaffe in Battle of Britain during Second World War in northern France and southern Britain.

== Reception ==
=== Battle of Britain II: Wings of Victory ===
Battle of Britain II: Wings of Victory

Aggregate score
Aggregator	Score
Metacritic	75/100

Review scores
Publication	Score
4Players	66%
Computer Games Magazine	3/5
Computer Gaming World	3/5
Eurogamer	5/10
IGN	8.2/10
Jeuxvideo.com	13/20
PC Gamer (UK)	68%
PC Gamer (US)	84%

Battle of Britain II received "generally favourable reviews" according to the review aggregation website Metacritic. Though receiving favourable reviews, several reviewers including IGN and Eurogamer cited technical issues such as bugs along with performance problems.

=== Air Battles: Sky Defender ===
Air Battles: Sky Defender

Aggregate score
Aggregator	Score
Metacritic	70/100

Review scores
Publication	Score
GameSpot	7.5/10
PC Gamer (US)	65%

Air Battles received "mixed or average reviews" according to Metacritic.
