= M4 (video game) =

1992 video game

- Developer(s): Deadly Games
- Publisher(s): Deadly Games
- Designer(s): Rene Vidmer
- Platform(s): Macintosh, Windows 3.x
- Release: 1992 (Mac), 1996 (Win 3.x)

M4 is a computer game developed by Deadly Games in 1992 for the Macintosh and in 1996 for Windows 3.x.

== Plot ==
M4, also known by its full length name as M4: Sherman Tank Simulator or its German release as M4 Tank Simulator, is a tank simulation where the player is a tank commander for an M4 Sherman tank during World War II.

== Gameplay ==
The game contains a set of earphones for the player to wear, allowing the player to hear communications from headquarters and other battle zone units. Game options are point-and-click and displayed on a graphic of tank hardware which is the activation command. The player uses a map overlay to navigate the tank to a sector. On the communication screen, the player chooses what frequency to listen to and on the same screen can respond to commands, as well as hear weather reports, and other items.

== Reception ==
M4 was reviewed in 1993 in Dragon #193 by Hartley, Patricia, and Kirk Lesser in "The Role of Computers" column. The reviewers gave the game 5 out of 5 stars.

Markus Dahlberg reviewed M4 for Swedish magazine Datormagazin in 1994. Dahlberg felt that the game did recreate the feel of sitting inside a tank to some extent, and that the headphones actually give an authentic feel and the sound was very good. He felt that the graphics were obsolete, and noted that the radio communication was the only thing in the game that was really good.

== Reviews ==
- Computer Games Strategy Plus
- Computer Game Review
