= B-17 Gunner: Air War Over Germany =

2001 video game from Infogrames

- Developer: Sunstorm Interactive
- Publisher: Infogrames
- Platform: Windows
- Release: NA: May 2001
- Genre: Simulation
- Mode: Single-player

B-17 Gunner: Air War Over Germany is a 2001 video game from Infogrames. The game was endorsed by the 390th Bombardment Group, a veteran's group made up of members of one of the most decorated US squadrons from World War II.

== Gameplay ==
In B-17 Gunner: Air War Over Germany, gameplay centers on manning the defensive gunner stations of a B-17 Flying Fortress during World War II bombing missions over Europe. Rather than simulating flight, the game drops players directly into mid-air combat, tasking them with shooting down waves of German fighters while protecting their aircraft. Players rotate between six gunner positions—nose, top turret, ball turret, left and right waist guns, and tail gun—each offering a limited field of view and varying degrees of effectiveness. Bombing runs are handled through a simple point-and-click interface: players are shown a target image at the start of each mission and must align the bombsight and release payloads as the aircraft approaches. Success is measured by bombing accuracy and defensive performance, with the ultimate goal of surviving 25 missions to earn a return home.

== Development ==
B-17 Gunner: Air War Over Germany was announced in April 2001. It was showcased at a Toy Fair in February 2001.

== Reception ==
Reception

Review scores
Publication	Score
GameSpy	44%
GameSpot	3.7/10
Games Domain	1/5
IGN	5.2/10

GameSpot gave the game a score of 3.7 out of 10 stating: "Despite its simplicity, B-17 Gunner could have been an enjoyable, if mindless, arcade romp that you'd fire up for 20 minutes here and there to shoot down some planes and bomb some targets. Unfortunately, B-17 Gunner's numerous problems make it a product with little value, even at its reduced retail cost of $20"
