= Across the Rhine =

1995 video game

- Developer: MPS Labs
- Publisher: MicroProse
- Platform: MS-DOS
- Release: 1995
- Genre: Computer wargame
- Mode: Single-player

Across the Rhine (known in Europe as 1944: Across the Rhine) is a 1995 computer wargame developed by MPS Labs and published by MicroProse. The game was re-released digitally using DOSBox, supporting Windows, macOS, and Linux platforms.

== Gameplay ==
Across the Rhine is a computer wargame with real-time gameplay. It simulates the clash between American and Nazi German forces during World War II.

== Development ==
During development, Across the Rhine was presented at the 1994 Consumer Electronics Show.

== Reception ==
Reception

Review scores
Publication	Score
Computer Game Review	83/69/80
PC Gamer	76%

In Computer Games Strategy Plus, Mike Robel found Across the Rhine a flawed but interest title, with a "very steep learning curve". Writing for Computer Game Review, Frank Snyder called the game' "an impressive tank simulator that will certainly appease strategy sim fans". The magazine's Tasos Kaiafas was less positive, largely panning the game.
