= Days of War =

2017 multiplayer shooter video game

- Developer: Driven Arts
- Publisher: Driven Arts
- Engine: Unreal Engine 4
- Platforms: Microsoft Windows; PlayStation 4; Xbox One
- Release: 2020
- Genre: First-person shooter
- Mode: Multiplayer

Days of War is a multiplayer first-person shooter video game developed and published by Driven Arts. It was released for Microsoft Windows through Steam Early Access on January 26, 2017. The game is set to fully release for Microsoft Windows, in 2020. The game allows up to thirty-two players in a World War II setting.

== Gameplay ==
Days of War will feature four types of gameplay: capture the flag; deathmatch; search and destroy; and domination. Players will be able to select from six classes of infantry including: rifleman; machine gunner; and sniper.

== See also ==
- Battalion 1944
- Day of Defeat
