= U-boat (video game) =

1994 video game

- Developer: Deadly Games
- Publisher: Deadly Games
- Designer: Rene Vidmer
- Platform: Macintosh
- Release: 1994
- Genre: Computer wargame
- Mode: Single-player

U-boat is a 1994 computer game developed by American studio Deadly Games for the Macintosh.

== Gameplay ==
U-boat is a game where the player is on the German side during the dawn of World War II. The player's submarine patrols the North Sea and only returns to port to refuel. The player gets missions involving attacks on Allied ships. Commands are given in a small window on the lower half of the control panel screen. On the map view, courses are plotted, enemy ships are located, and the submarine is controlled.

== Reception ==
Markus Dahlberg reviewed U-boat for Swedish magazine Datormagazin in 1994. Dahlberg enjoyed the atmosphere of the game, although he found parts of the game boring just like really being in a submarine. He found the graphics acceptable but was annoyed by changing windows to get new commands. He felt that players who have a lot of time and are interested in following orders and giving some tactical thinking would find U-boat to be a good investment.

== Legacy ==
The game also had a sequel titled U-Boat II: Drumbeat, again only for the Macintosh in 1995.

== Reviews ==
- Computer Gaming World - 1994
- Computer Game Review
