= ÜberSoldier =

2005 video game

- Developer: Burut Creative Team
- Publishers: RU: Russobit-M; NA: CDV (Note: Distributed by Koch Media in the United Kingdom.)
- Platform: Microsoft Windows
- Release: RU: November 18, 2005; NA: March 27, 2006; UK: March 31, 2006
- Genre: First-person shooter
- Mode: Single-player

ÜberSoldier is a first-person shooter video game developed by Burut Creative Team and released in Russia in 2005 and in North America and Europe in 2006. The game's original Russian title is Восточный Фронт (translated: Eastern Front).

== Background story ==
ÜberSoldier follows the journey of the fictitious Karl Stolz, a German soldier who has, through the process of being killed in duty, then being resurrected, acquired supernatural powers which aid him in combat. Just before he was indoctrinated by the Nazis, a member of the German Resistance rescued him and effectively changed his loyalties. Karl Stolz now became the ÜberSoldier of the German Resistance helping them destroy the "ÜberSoldier fabrication" infrastructure.

== Powers ==
The power of the resurrection grants the player the ability to stop bullets. The shield retains the bullets until they hit something like a wall or an enemy. In the latter example, the bullet would kill or wound the enemy, making it a useful tool. Also, if the player deactivates the shield while bullets are caught in it, they will be shot back in reverse trajectory, which will kill any enemies that are hit by the flying bullets. The player is also able to increase the amount of damage the players can take.

== Sequel ==
A sequel was released in 2008, known as ÜberSoldier II or Crimes of War, or under the original title Восточный Фронт: Крах Анненербе (translated: Eastern Front: Fall of Ahnenerbe).

== Reception ==
ÜberSoldier was generally met with mediocre and negative reviews and has a Metacritic score of 57/100 based on 32 reviews. Bob Colayco of GameSpot gave the game a rating of 4.6/10, praising the graphics but criticizing the voice acting, high system requirements, and lack of multiplayer support. The game is now available digitally on Steam, Epic Game Store and the ZOOM Platform.
