= Action Stations! (video game) =

1990 video game

- Developer(s): Conflict Analytics
- Publisher(s): Conflict Analytics
- Platform(s): Amiga, MS-DOS
- Release: 1990: MS-DOS; 1991: Amiga
- Genre(s): Turn-based strategy

Action Stations! is a 1990 video game published by Conflict Analytics.

Action Stations! Scenario Utility Disk was also released.

== Gameplay ==
Action Stations! is a game in which the focus is the involvement of surface officers in conducting war at sea.

Each player gives orders to their ships for the next 3 minutes of game time. The orders are then executed simultaneously.

Game play includes provisions for salvo chasing, spotting of the fall of shot by aircraft, flares dropping by aircraft and the use of smoke for cover. There are scenarios from a small one with the German Graf Spee against 3 Allied cruisers to large scenarios like the battles around Ironbottom Sound.

Each ship has detailed armor specifications and comprehensive data about the types of guns each has with rates of fire and penetration being taken into account.

== Reception ==
Lt. H. E. Dille reviewed the game for Computer Gaming World, and stated that it was "a superlative first effort. The play value is superb and completion of all the scenarios included with the game could take players up to a year of standard play to master."

Bob Proctor reviewed the Action Stations! Scenario Utility Disk for Computer Gaming World, and stated that "No matter how much one enjoys the basic Action Stations! program, this new module offers something to extend every wargamer's enjoyment of the product."
