= Combat flight simulation game =

Video game genre

Combat flight simulators are vehicle simulation games, amateur flight simulation computer programs used to simulate military aircraft and their operations. These are distinct from dedicated flight simulators used for professional pilot and military flight training which consist of realistic physical recreations of the actual aircraft cockpit, often with a full-motion platform.

Combat flight simulation titles are more numerous than civilian flight simulators due to the variety of subject matter available and market demand. Many free flight simulators, such as the open source Linux Air Combat, Falcon 4.0, Digital Combat Simulator and Rise of Flight, can be downloaded for free off the Internet.

== History ==
=== 1970s ===
Prior to the rise of modern-day video games, electro-mechanical games (EM games) were produced that used rear image projection in a manner similar to a zoetrope to produce moving animations on a screen. This technology led to the rise of flight simulation arcade games, initially in the form of EM games. One such EM game was Jet Rocket, a flight simulator released by Sega in 1970 that featured cockpit controls that could move the player's aircraft around a landscape displayed on a screen and shoot missiles at targets that would explode when hit. The game displayed three-dimensional terrain with buildings, produced using special belt technology along with fluorescent paint to simulate a night view. Upon its debut, the game was cloned by three Chicago arcade manufacturers, which led to the game under-performing in North America. Sega released several other similar EM flight combat games, including Dive Bomber (1971) and Air Attack (1972).

Combat flight simulator video games began appearing from the late 1970s. In 1975, Taito released the arcade video game simulator Interceptor, an early first-person combat flight simulator that involved piloting a jet fighter using an eight-way joystick to aim and shoot at enemy aircraft.

Sega's last EM combat flight simulator was Heli-Shooter (1977), which combines the use of a CPU processor with electro-mechanical components, screen projection and audio tape deck. The gameplay involves the player piloting a helicopter using a throttle joystick (to accelerate and decelerate) and pedals (to maneuver left and right) across a realistic three-dimensional landscape and shooting at military targets across the landscape. In Japan, it was one of the top ten highest-grossing EM arcade games of 1977, and it released in North America the same year.

=== 1980s ===
The 1980s experienced a wave of more advanced simulation video games, with companies such as Atari Inc. releasing their own game called Red Baron in 1980, which used QuadraScan graphics and sound effects to simulate first-person flight combat. Other games such as the earliest version of Microsoft Flight Simulator (1982) had crude graphics, simple flight models, and a combat option with "dog fighting" in a World War I Sopwith Camel. Shortly after Microsoft Flight Simulator was released for the 8-bit computer, Microsoft released Jet in 1985. This simulator used simple filled wire frame graphics and a small generic battle space to allow players to fight MiGs in an F/A-18 or F-16. There were also titles released for the Atari 2600 that simulated flight combat, two examples being Mattel's Air Raiders (1982) and Milton Bradley's Spitfire Attack (1983).

Later in the 1980s, it became a trend for arcade flight combat simulators to use hydraulic motion simulator arcade cabinets. The trend was sparked by Sega's "taikan" games, with "taikan" meaning "body sensation" in Japanese. Yu Suzuki's team at Sega (later known as Sega AM2) developed hydraulic motion simulator cockpit cabinets for flight combat games such as Space Harrier (1985), After Burner (1987) and the R360 games.

=== 1990s–present ===
In the early 1990s, arcade flight combat simulators began adopting 3D polygon graphics. Taito's Air Inferno (1990) was a 3D flight simulator utilizing a motion simulator cockpit cabinet. Atari Games followed with the 3D flight combat simulator the following year, Steel Talons (1991). Namco then followed with the 3D arcade combat flight simulator Air Combat (1993).

During the 1990s to early 2000s, there was a transition from traditional video game platforms like arcades, to consoles such as the original PlayStation, for their ability to be played at home. PC games remained popular during this time, as many publishers continued to produce games primarily for the PC platform. Due to the limitations and the relative simplicity of the controllers available for gaming consoles at the time, flight simulators remained largely absent from consoles for years to come. Several rival publishers rose during this period such as NovaLogic with titles like the Comanche Series that simulated helicopter combat, and Electronic Arts with Jane's WWII Fighters which improved upon features such as detailed visible damage.

Newer software in the genre include Digital Combat Simulator (released in 2008 and mostly simulating modern aircraft), Rise of Flight (released in 2009 and set in World War I) and IL-2 Sturmovik: Cliffs of Dover (released in 2011 and set in World War II). These three are examples of accurate simulation PC games, as opposed to arcade-style air combat games such as Bandai Namco Entertainment's highly-successful Ace Combat series.

== Types ==
Combat flight games are classified according to their historical period, type of aircraft, and level of detail. This method of classifying means that many simulators belong to more than one category, which leads to arguments about what can be considered actual simulations instead of games. Generally, simulations are expected to be imitations of real-world technology, while games are not; therefore, every game with flying in them does not fit into the category of "flight simulation".

Combat flight games level of realism can be classified as the following:

- Combat flight shooter (less realistic)
- Survey simulation
- Study simulation (most realistic)

=== Combat flight shooter ===
Gameplay from Ace Combat 7, a combat flight shooter game.

Combat flight shooters have various elements that are less realistic than simulators, such as simplified controls and physics models, compressed or non-existent start up procedures, emphasis on close-range dogfighting over beyond-visual-range combat for modern jets, and the ability to carry a physically impossible amount of weapons compared to real-life aircraft loadouts. Examples of console or PC games include Ace Combat, H.A.W.X., and Project Wingman.

Many arcade combat flight shooters in amusement arcades are housed in cockpit arcade cabinets that use motion simulator technology, often incorporating hydraulics. Popular examples include the original arcade versions of After Burner, Thunder Blade and Air Combat. Sega's R360 motion simulator cabinet notably features full 360-degree rotation, used by the arcade games G-LOC: Air Battle and Wing War.

=== Survey ===
A survey simulation is a classification of simulator that includes a variety (or survey) of aircraft from the period in question. This type of classification applies to many historical combat simulators, and typically includes aircraft from all nations participating in the conflict. Early simulators suffered from flight models and instrument panels that differed little between aircraft. As the technology got better, so did the diversity of aircraft, which forced the virtual pilot to learn the carefully modelled strengths and weaknesses of the various types of aircraft (e.g. the different fighting and flying styles of a Spitfire versus a Messerschmitt 109 in IL-2 Sturmovik or a Mitsubishi Zero versus a US Navy F4F Wildcat in Combat Flight Simulator 2).

Modern jet survey simulators have been developed as well, such as US Navy Fighters (USNF) and Jane's USAF by Jane's/Electronic Arts, typically with simplified and generic modelling of radar, navigation, and weapons. The turn of the century saw advancements in technology that increased the capabilities of these simulators, simplifying and improving their weapon handling and flight models, as well as updated visuals. Titles featuring these improvements include Jane's Combat Simulations, a line of flight simulations originally developed by Electronic Arts and later continued by the company Third Wire, as well as the series Strike Fighters: Project 1 and Wings over Europe.

=== Study ===
The "study sim" is a genre of simulation games that focuses on modelling an aircraft's systems as accurately as possible. Advancing computer technology made this possible, with the development of highly detailed models that improved upon the fidelity of avionics, weapons systems, physics, flight models, graphics, etc. and allowed for fully interactive cockpits where virtually every control was mapped and functional. This was important as modern jet combat aircraft and helicopters have a variety of complex electronic and weapon systems that are specific to a particular aircraft.

Early iterations of simulators in this genre include the release of EF2000 by Digital Image Design (DiD) which quickly garnered a dedicated following, including a user group that produced a detailed online manual of weapons and tactics, as well as the popular Falcon 4.0, a detailed simulation of the USAF F-16 Fighting Falcon. Other development of these simulators includes a collaborative and specialized effort between Electronic Arts and Jane's in the 1990s, with titles such as Jane's Longbow, Jane's Longbow 2, Jane's F-15 and Jane's F/A-18.

Helicopter simulations began in 1986 with the title Gunship by MicroProse. Nine years later, in 1995, Digital Integration Ltd. released Apache Longbow, the most sophisticated helicopter simulation of the time. In 1996 it was exceeded by Jane's AH-64D Longbow, a game created by Origin Systems and released by Electronic Arts as part of the Jane's Combat Simulator series. The sequel, Jane's Longbow 2 (1997), was one of the earliest simulations to take advantage of hardware accelerated graphics, including advanced lighting. 1998 saw the release of Enemy Engaged: Apache vs Havoc by Empire Interactive, which allowed players to choose to fly for either the US or Russia.

The accuracy and complexity of these simulators continued to grow, and in 2008 the Digital Combat Simulator (DCS) released DCS: Black Shark, the first of a series of simulations that featured a complete and detailed cockpit with all the relevant switches accurately modeled and functional, and mapped over 500 key-commands. DCS also supported a variety of input devices aside from the traditional joystick, throttle, and pedals, featuring built-in support for TrackIR and virtual reality with 6 degrees of freedom which, in conjunction with the interactive 3D-cockpit, created a realistic experience.

=== Modern jet ===
Modern jet simulators are usually classified by their historical context or level of details (study versus survey). There have been many modern jet sims that concentrate on existing fighters (several AV-8 Harrier II sims, and others such as Fleet Defender by MicroProse, and F-22 Lightning 3 and F-22 Raptor by NovaLogic), whereas others concentrate on future fighters (e.g., F-22 Total Air War by Digital Image Design in 1998). While many simulators either classify as a study sim or a survey sim, Lock On: Modern Air Combat is an example of a game that attempts to bridge the study/survey gap with highly detailed models of several US and Russian aircraft.

=== Multi-player ===
Before multiplayer games became popular, many simulators could only be played by a single player. This continued to be the standard until the late 1990s when most titles included some sort of multi-player/network capability. In single-player combat simulators, every entity other than the players' own aircraft are controlled by the program's "AI" (artificial intelligence), and modern video games create very sophisticated and intelligent AI with independent behavior for adversaries and allies. Multiplayer games, which usually also contain AI, allow players to oppose one or many human players. After the growth of the internet, many simulators were created that exist only or primarily as internet multiplayer versions (e.g., Air Warrior, the massively multiplayer Fighter Ace, WarBirds, Aces High, World War II Online, Ace Online, War Thunder, Fighter Wing 2 and others).

== Gameplay ==
=== Missions, campaigns, mission builders ===
Many players of both video games and simulators seek games for their replay value. Simulators enhance the replay value by offering a variety of single missions consisting of short, randomly generated missions as well as longer campaigns consisting of several smaller mission or objectives. Most campaigns are "dynamic flowing", which means they change according to the results of each successive mission (e.g. if the player destroys a "target of opportunity" which turns out to be a truck carrying an enemy leader, then the campaign starts to take a different path). Some campaign models have been developed which are fully dynamic, and where successive missions take place in an environment which is persistent (if a building is destroyed in one mission, it remains destroyed in the next and will only be rebuilt in view of limited resources, realistic time and strategic priorities, etc.). A notable pioneer in this area was Andy Hollis, producer of the Jane's Longbow series (Jane's AH-64D Longbow and Jane's Longbow 2). Digital Image Design, with their release of F-22 Total Air War in 1998, allowed for a transparency into the larger strategic battlefield by use of multiple screens and a "God's eye view". Many simulators also include "mission builders" which allow the player to create their own missions.

=== Controls and other hardware ===
Combat flight simulators are among the most computer and graphics demanding applications at any given time, as they are real-time applications with multiple processes happening at once. This leads many simulation fans to constantly upgrade their hardware, including the most advanced graphics cards. These sims have also given rise to a variety of hardware add-ons such as "HOTAS" (hands on throttle and stick) controllers that allow full control of most functions without touching the keyboard. Voice control and head-tracking view control systems are also available for home flight sim enthusiasts.

== Titles ==
The tables below define rough guidelines of what might classify as combat flight simulation games.

=== World War I ===
Title	Publisher/Developer	Year	Notes
Knights of the Sky	MicroProse	(1990)	
Red Baron	Sierra Entertainment	(1990)	
Wings	Cinemaware	(1990)	
Blue Max: Aces of the Great War	Three-Sixty Pacific	(1990)	
Warbirds	Atari Corporation	(1991)	
Dawn Patrol	Rowan Software	(1994)	
Manfred von Krashenberns Flying Circus	Cosmi	(1994)	
Wings of Glory	Origin Systems	(1994)	
Flying Corps	Empire Interactive	(1997)	
Red Baron II	Sierra Entertainment	(1997)	
Red Baron 3D	Sierra Entertainment	(1998)	
Dawn of Aces	iEntertainment Network	(1998)	
Dawn of Aces II	iEntertainment Network	(2002)	
Wings of Honour	CI Games	(2003)	
Skyknights of World War I: Dawn of Aces III	iEntertainment Network	(2003)	
Over Flanders Fields	OBD Software	(2005)	
Wings of Honour: Battles of the Red Baron	CI Games	(2006)	
First Eagles: The Great War 1918	Third Wire	(2006)	
Rise of Flight: The First Great Air War	777 Studios	(2009)	
Wings Over Flanders Fields	OBD Software	(2014)	
IL-2 Sturmovik: Flying Circus	1C Game Studios	(2019)	

=== World War II ===
Title	Developer/Publisher	Year	Notes
Ace of Aces	Accolade	(1986)	
Battlehawks 1942	LucasFilm Games	(1988)	
Bomber	Inline Design	(1989)	
Their Finest Hour	LucasFilm Games	(1989)	
Hellcats over the Pacific	Parsoft Interactive / Graphic Simulations	(1991)	
Chuck Yeager's Air Combat	Electronic Arts	(1991)	
Secret Weapons of the Luftwaffe	LucasFilm Games	(1991)	
Fighter Duel: Corsair vs. Zero	Jaeger Software	(1991)	
Aces of the Pacific	Dynamix Sierra	(1992)	
B-17 Flying Fortress	Vektor Grafix	(1992)	
Aces Over Europe	Sierra Entertainment	(1993)	
Reach for the Skies	Virgin Games	(1993)	
1942: The Pacific Air War	MicroProse	(1994)	
Overlord	Rowan Software	(1994)	
WarBirds	iEntertainment Network	(1995)	
Air Warrior	Kesmai	(1995)	
Fighter Duel	Jaeger Software	(1995)	
Fighter Ace	VR-1 Russia / BST Soft	(1997)	
Air Warrior II	Kesmai	(1997)	
Air Warrior III	Kesmai	(1997)	
European Air War	MicroProse	(1998)	
Microsoft Combat Flight Simulator	Microsoft Games Studio	(1998)	
Luftwaffe Commander	Strategic Simulations, Inc.	(1999)	
Fighter Squadron: The Screamin' Demons Over Europe	Parsoft / Activision	(1999)	
Jane's WWII Fighters	Jane's Combat Simulations	(1999)	
Aces High	HiTech Creations	(2000)	
B-17 Flying Fortress: The Mighty 8th	Wayward Design	(2000)	
Combat Flight Simulator 2	Microsoft Games Studio	(2000)	
Rowan's Battle of Britain	Empire Interactive	(2000)	
IL-2 Sturmovik	1C:Maddox Games	(2001)	
Combat Flight Simulator 3: Battle for Europe	Microsoft Games Studio	(2002)	
Secret Weapons Over Normandy	LucasFilm Games	(2003)	
IL-2 Sturmovik: Forgotten Battles	1C:Maddox Games	(2003)	
World War II: Pacific Heroes	City Interactive	(2004)	
Pacific Fighters	1C:Maddox Games	(2004)	
Battle of Britain II: Wings of Victory	A2A Simulations	(2005)	
Combat Wings	City Interactive	(2005)	
Heroes of the Pacific	Transmission Games	(2005)	
IL-2 Sturmovik: 1946	1C:Maddox Games	(2006)	
Air Conflicts	3Division Entertainment / Frogster Interactive	(2006)	
Combat Wings: Battle of Britain	City Interactive	(2006)	
Attack on Pearl Harbor	Legendo Entertainment	(2007)	
Dogfights: The Game	Kuma Reality Games	(2007)	
IL-2 Sturmovik: Birds of Prey	Gaijin Entertainment	(2009)	Wings of Prey on PC
Air Conflicts: Aces of World War II	Cowboy Rodeo / Graffiti Entertainment	(2009)	
Heroes over Europe	Transmission Games	(2009)	
IL-2 Sturmovik: Cliffs of Dover	1C:Maddox Games	(2011)	
Air Conflicts: Secret Wars	Games Farm / bitComposer	(2011)	
Birds of Steel	Gaijin Entertainment	(2012)	
Air Conflicts: Pacific Carriers	Games Farm / bitComposer	(2012)	
Combat Wings: The Great Battles of World War II	City Interactive	(2012)	
Dogfight 1942	City Interactive	(2012)	
IL-2 Sturmovik: Great Battles	1C Game Studios	(2013)	
World of Warplanes	Wargaming	(2013)	
War Thunder	Gaijin Entertainment	(2013)	
Wings over the Reich	OBD Software	(2018)	

=== Korean War ===
Title	Publisher/Developer	Year	Notes
Chuck Yeager's Air Combat	Electronic Arts	(1991)	
Sabre Ace: Conflict Over Korea	Eagle Interactive	(1997)	
MiG Alley	Rowan Software	(1999)	
War Thunder	Gaijin Entertainment	(2013)	
Korea: IL-2 Series	1C Game Studios	(2026)	

=== Vietnam War ===
Title	Developer/Publisher	Year	Notes
Chuck Yeager's Air Combat	Electronic Arts	(1991)	
Flight of the Intruder	Spectrum Holobyte	(1991)	
Wings Over Vietnam	Third Wire	(2004)	
Jane's Fighters Anthology	Jane's Combat Simulations	(1997)	
Strike Fighters 2: Vietnam	Third Wire	(2009)	
Mach Storm	Namco	(2013)	
Air Conflicts: Vietnam	Games Farm/BitComposer Entertainment	(2013)	
War Thunder	Gaijin Entertainment	(2018)	Vietnam-era aircraft added from update 1.81

=== Modern ===
Title	Publisher/Developer	Year	Type	Notes
Fighter Pilot	Digital Integration Ltd.	1983		F-15 Sim
F-15 Strike Eagle	MicroProse	1985		
Jet (video game)	subLOGIC	1985		
Jump Jet / Harrier Mission	Anirog Software Ltd.	1985		
Tomahawk	Digital Integration Ltd.	1985		AH-64 Sim
Falcon	Spectrum HoloByte	1987		
JetFighter: The Adventure	Velocity Development	1988		
F/A-18 Interceptor	Electronic Arts	1988		
F-19 Stealth Fighter	MicroProse	1988		
F-15 Strike Eagle II	MicroProse	1989		
F-16 Combat Pilot	Digital Integration Ltd.	1989		
Fighter Bomber	Vektor Grafix	1989		Released as Strike Aces in the USA
F29 Retaliator	DID	1989		The F29 is a fictional fighter jet.
Apache Strike	Activision	1989		
A-10 Tank Killer	Dynamix	1990		
JetFighter II: Advanced Tactical Fighter	Velocity Development	1990		
Chocks Away	The Fourth Dimension	1990		
Falcon 3.0	Spectrum Holobyte	1991		
F-22 Interceptor	Ingram Entertainment	1991		
F-117A Nighthawk Stealth Fighter 2.0	Microprose	1991		
LHX	Electronic Arts	1991		
Top Gun: Danger Zone	Konami	1991		
Birds of Prey	Electronic Arts	1991		
Chuck Yeager's Air Combat	Electronic Arts	1991		
AV-8B Harrier Assault	Domark	1992		
Harrier Jump Jet (video game)	MicroProse	1992		
Air Combat	Namco	1993	Arcade	Arcade video game
Air Combat 22	Namco	1995	Arcade	Arcade video game
Combat Air Patrol	Psygnosis	1993		
F-15 Strike Eagle III	MicroProse	1993		
Tornado	Digital Integration Ltd.	1993		
TFX	DID	1993		
Dogfight	MicroProse	1993		
Super Strike Eagle	MicroProse	1993		Super NES console game
Strike Commander	Origin Systems	1993	Simlite	
Fleet Defender	MicroProse	1994		
Comanche	Novalogic	1994		
Flying Nightmares	Domark Software, Inc.	1994		Harrier Sim
EF2000	DID	1995		
Apache Longbow	Digital Integration Ltd.	1995		
Su-27 Flanker	Eagle Dynamics	1995		
A-10 Attack!	Parsoft Interactive	1995		
Air Combat	Namco	1995	Arcade	PlayStation console game
Coala	Empire Interactive	1995		
Comanche	Novalogic	1995		
Navy Strike	Empire Interactive	1995		
F-22 Lightning II	Novalogic	1996	Simlite	
Jane's AH-64D Longbow	Jane's Combat Simulations	1996		
A-10 Cuba!	Activision	1996		
Bogey Dead 6	SCEE	1996		
iF-16	Digital Integration Ltd.	1996		
Ace Combat 2	Namco	1997	Arcade	
Jane's Fighters Anthology	Electronic Arts	1997		
JSF	Eidos	1997		
Hind	Digital Integration Ltd.	1997		
F/A-18 Korea	Graphic Simulations Corporation	1997		
F-22 Raptor	NovaLogic	1997	Simlite	
F-22: Air Dominance Fighter	DID	1997		
iF-22 Raptor	Magic Labs	1997		
Jane's Longbow 2	Jane's Combat Simulations	1997		
Comanche 3	Novalogic	1997		
Jane's F-15	Jane's Combat Simulations	1998		
Jane's IAF: Israeli Air Force	Jane's Combat Simulations	1998		
Falcon 4.0	MicroProse	1998		
Enemy Engaged: Apache vs Havoc	Razorworks	1998		
Aero Fighters Assault	Paradigm Entertainment	1998		
Comanche Gold	Novalogic	1998		
Hell-Copter	Ubisoft	1998		
Mig-29 Fulcrum	Novalogic	1998	Simlite	
F-16 Multirole Fighter	Novalogic	1998	Simlite	
Ace Combat 3: Electrosphere	Namco	1999	Arcade	
F-22 Lightning 3	NovaLogic	1999	Simlite	
Jane's F/A-18	Jane's Combat Simulations	1999		
Jane's USAF	Jane's Combat Simulations	1999		
F/A-18E Super Hornet	Titus Interactive/Digital Integration Ltd.	2000		
AeroWings 2: Airstrike	Crave Entertainment and CRI	2000		
Airforce Delta	Konami	2000	Arcade	
Gunship!	MicroProse/Hasbro	2000		
Ace Combat 04: Shattered Skies	Namco	2001	Arcade	
Eurofighter Typhoon	DID	2001		
Comanche 4	Novalogic	2001		
Flanker 2.5	Eagle Dynamics	2002		
Aces of the Air	Highwaystar	2002		
AirForce Delta Storm	Konami	2002	Arcade	
Lock On: Modern Air Combat	Eagle Dynamics	2003		
F/A-18 Operation Iraqi Freedom	Graphsim Entertainment	2003		
Ace Combat 5: The Unsung War	Namco	2004	Arcade	
Airforce Delta Strike	Konami	2004	Arcade	
Falcon 4.0: Allied Force	Lead Pursuit	2005		
Ace Combat Zero: The Belkan War	Namco	2006	Arcade	
Red Jets	Graffiti Entertainment	2006		
Wings Over Europe	Third Wire Productions	2006		
Ace Combat 6: Fires of Liberation	Namco Bandai Games	2007	Arcade	
Ace Combat X: Skies of Deception	Namco Bandai Games	2006	Arcade	
Ace Combat: Joint Assault	Namco Bandai Games	2010	Arcade	
Ace Combat: Assault Horizon	Namco Bandai Games	2011	Arcade	
Ace Combat: Assault Horizon Legacy	Namco Bandai Games	2011	Arcade	Remake of Ace Combat 2
Strike Fighters 2	Third Wire Productions	2008		
Digital Combat Simulator	Eagle Dynamics	2008	Study	
H.A.W.X	Ubisoft	2009	Arcade	
H.A.W.X 2	Ubisoft	2010	Arcade	
Apache: Air Assault	Gaijin Entertainment	2010		
Take On Helicopters: Hinds	Bohemia Interactive	2012		
Strike Fighters 2: North Atlantic	Third Wire Productions	2012		
Air Missions: HIND	3DIVISION/Games Farm	2016		
VTOL VR	Boundless Dynamics, LLC.	2017		Uses near futuristic aircraft while maintaining realism
Ace Combat 7: Skies Unknown	Bandai Namco Entertainment	2019	Arcade	
War Thunder	Gaijin Entertainment	2020		Modern aircraft and systems made their debut starting from 2020;Most notably the addition of Su-27, F-16 and F-15 families to the game's tech tree.
Project Wingman	Sector D2 / Humble Games	2020	Arcade	
Tiny Combat Arena	Why485 / Microprose	2021	Arcade	
Nuclear Option	Shockfront Studios	2022	Simlite	Set in the 2080s, allows usage of Tactical and Strategic nuclear weapons
Ace Combat 8: Wings of Theve	Bandai Namco Entertainment	2026	Arcade	Set during 2029 in the fictional world of Strangereal

== See also ==
- Flight simulation video game
