= WarBirds =

Series of video games

- Cover art of the first game
- Genre: Combat flight simulation
- Developer: Interactive Creations of Grapevine
- Publisher: iEntertainment Network
- First release: WarBirds; December 1995
- Latest release: WarBirds: Dogfights 2016; 2016

WarBirds is a series of massively multiplayer online and offline World War II combat flight simulation video games originally developed by Interactive Creations of Grapevine and published by iEntertainment Network in 1995. The game includes an air combat flight simulator as well as a simulator for tanks and other ground vehicles and inspired a fan cult and conventions, and a book titled WarBirds: The Story So Far. The game includes over two dozen aircraft including the Spitfire, the P-51 Mustang, and the B-17 Flying Fortress.

Following 1999's WarBirds II, WarBirds III was released for Mac and PC in 2002. WarBirds III was a runner-up for GameSpot's annual "Best Simulation on PC" award, which went to Flanker 2.5. WarBirds: The Mighty Eight was released in 2007. A more recent version, WarBirds 2008, includes tanks, trucks, halftracks, new aircraft, and new graphics. WarBirds: Dogfights was released in 2010.

In 1999, some of the original development team, including John "Killer" MacQueen, Rodney "Hatch" Hodge, and Chris "Mo" Sherland, went on to form Cornered Rat Software where they developed WWII Online. Others followed Dale "HiTech" Addink to form HiTech Creations and develop Aces High.
