= Airforce Delta (video game) =

1999 video game

- North American Dreamcast cover art
- Developers: Konami Computer Entertainment Yokohama (DC); Climax Studios (GBC)
- Publisher: Konami
- Platforms: Dreamcast; Game Boy Color
- Release: Dreamcast: JP: July 29, 1999; NA: September 9, 1999; EU: February 18, 2000; Game Boy Color: NA: November 8, 2000; JP: November 22, 2000; UK: December 8, 2000
- Genre: Flight simulator
- Mode: Single-player

Airforce Delta (Note: Japanese: エアフォース デルタ, Hepburn: Eafōsu Deruta), known as Deadly Skies in Europe, is a combat flight simulation game released in 1999 by Konami for the Dreamcast. It is the first installment in the Airforce Delta series. The game is a 3D aerial combat simulation, featuring many jet fighter aircraft. The game is single player only and has been compared to Ace Combat by GameSpy and GameSpot. At the time of the game's release, Airforce Delta was the only combat flight simulation game available for the Dreamcast.

A Game Boy Color version of Airforce Delta was also released in 2000.

== Gameplay ==
The game features simplistic controls with an emphasis on arcade-style action rather than accurate flight simulation.

The mission briefings are complete with an illustrated step-by-step guide which shows the designated targets and the ideal path to take. After completing a mission, players are awarded with money that can later be used to purchase superior aircraft. Variables such as mission completion time and the number of enemies disposed of dictate the amount of money the player will receive. When making a buying decision, choosing an aircraft most appropriate for the job is of the utmost importance. The most expensive does not necessarily mean the most practical.

Missions typically involve either seeking out and destroying the enemy or escorting friendly craft to a certain destination. The enemies encountered in Airforce Delta are diverse and range from air to ground and water capabilities and from offensive to defensive situations. Mission maps are based on fictional locations.

Airforce Delta features over thirty aircraft to take for a test flight. They are all based on real life aircraft both in looks and handling. Some of the planes available for these missions include the F-4 Phantom, F-14 Tomcat, A-10 Thunderbolt, Mig 29, Su-27 and the F-22 Raptor.

== Plot ==
Players take control of a mercenary that has been contracted to complete a number of strategic military missions. Each mission completed earns the player money, and the more money that is accumulated, the more sophisticated aircraft the player can purchase. Players select from a myriad of fighters and take to the skies to defend the newly independent Republic of Laconia from its many enemies.

The first mission involves a preemptive strike against numerous fighter planes that are planning to bomb the Laconian capital city of Naxos.

The game centers around the Federated Republic of Dzavailar. Ethnic tension and religious debate have caused the Republic to split into independent states. The defenseless Republic of Laconia is in dire need of military support. Rebels from the former Federated Republic of Dzavailar have decided to reunite a territory long divided by ethnic conflict. After years of civil war, Laconia is the only republic left standing and has asked a mercenary defense organization, Airforce Delta, to help keep it from falling to the dreaded unification movement.

As a commissioned lieutenant assigned to the Delta Squadron, the pilot is about to embark on a series of over 20 missions in very hostile territories.

== Reception ==
Reception

Aggregate score
| Aggregator | Score | |
| Aggregator | Dreamcast | GBC |
|---|---|---|
| GameRankings | 66% | 43% |

Review scores
| Publication | Score | |
| Publication | Dreamcast | GBC |
|---|---|---|
| AllGame | 3/5 | 1.5/5 |
| Consoles + | 86% | N/A |
| Edge | 7/10 | N/A |
| Electronic Gaming Monthly | 5.625/10 | N/A |
| Famitsu | 31/40 | N/A |
| Game Informer | 7.75/10 | N/A |
| GameSpot | 7/10 | 4.5/10 |
| GameSpy | 6/10 | N/A |
| IGN | 8.1/10 | 4/10 |
| Jeuxvideo.com | 14/20 | 1/20 |

The Dreamcast version of the game received average reviews, while the Game Boy Color version received unfavorable reviews, according to the review aggregation website GameRankings. In Japan, Famitsu gave the Dreamcast version a score of 31 out of 40.
