= The Mighty Eighth =

The Mighty Eighth may refer to:

- The Eighth Air Force, a numbered air force (NAF) of the United States Air Force.
  - B-17 Flying Fortress: The Mighty 8th, a combat flight simulation videogame published in 2000;
