= Combat Flight Simulator 2 =

2000 video game

Combat Flight Simulator 2: WW II Pacific Theater
- Developer: Microsoft
- Publisher: Microsoft
- Designer: Rob Brown
- Composer: Mikael Sandgren
- Series: Microsoft Flight Simulator
- Platform: Microsoft Windows
- Release: NA: October 10, 2000; EU: October 27, 2000
- Genre: Combat flight simulator
- Modes: Single-player, Multiplayer

Combat Flight Simulator 2: WW II Pacific Theater is a combat flight simulator game by Microsoft released in October 2000 for the Microsoft Windows. It is the sequel to Microsoft Combat Flight Simulator. The game takes place in the Pacific War and includes campaigns loosely based on historic air battles, from the American and Japanese perspective. A sequel, Combat Flight Simulator 3: Battle for Europe, was released in 2002.

== Gameplay ==
The game includes American planes F4F-4 Wildcat, F6F-3 Hellcat, F4U-1A Corsair, P-38F Lightning and Japanese planes A6M2 Zero, A6M5 Zero, N1K2 George.

== Reception ==
=== Sales ===
In the United States, Combat Flight Simulator 2 debuted at #11 on PC Data's computer game sales rankings for October 2000. It remained in the monthly top 20 through the end of the year.

In 2001, Combat Flight Simulator 2 achieved domestic sales of 285,728 units for revenues of $13.1 million, according to PC Data.

=== Critical reviews ===
Reception

Review score
Publication	Score
Computer Games Magazine	4/5

The editors of Computer Gaming World nominated Combat Flight Simulator 2 as the best simulation game of 2000, although it lost to Comanche vs. Hokum.
