= Jane's F/A-18 =

2000 video game

- Developer: EA Baltimore
- Publisher: Electronic Arts
- Designer: Michael J. McDonald
- Programmer: John Paquin
- Artist: Max D. Remington III
- Series: Jane's Combat Simulations
- Platform: Windows
- Release: NA: January 11, 2000
- Genre: Air combat simulation
- Modes: Single-player, multiplayer

Jane's F/A-18 is one of the final study flight simulators by Electronic Arts under Jane's Combat Simulations brand, the sequel to the highly successful Jane's F-15. Jane's F/A-18 was released in early 2000; it simulates the F/A-18E Super Hornet and carrier-based aviation in a fictional campaign around the Kola Peninsula during a Russian civil war. It comes with a mission builder as well as a campaign builder. Fans have created content such as new cockpits, enhanced graphics, new aircraft, vehicles, and also the Persian Gulf area ported from Jane's F-15 as the games shared the same graphics engine.

== Gameplay ==
Jane's F/A-18 had only a virtual cockpit, unlike Jane's F-15 which also had a 2D cockpit.

== Reception ==
In the United States, F/A-18 sold 115,599 copies and earned $3.46 million during the year 2000.

Jane's F/A-18 garnered generally positive reviews, and holds an average of 88% on aggregate web site GameRankings.

Jane's F/A-18 was a finalist for the Academy of Interactive Arts & Sciences' "Computer Simulation Game of the Year" award, which ultimately went to Microsoft Flight Simulator 2000. The editors of Computer Gaming World likewise nominated F/A-18 as the best simulation game of 2000, although it lost to Comanche vs. Hokum. The editors of Computer Games Magazine also nominated F/A-18 for their 2000 "Simulation of the Year" award.

== See also ==
- Falcon 4.0
