= Air Combat =

1995 video game

- European box art
- Developer: Namco
- Publishers: JP: Namco; NA: Namco Hometek; EU: Sony Computer Entertainment
- Producer: Kazumi Mizuno
- Designer: Masanori Kato
- Composers: Nobuhide Isayama; Masako Oogami
- Series: Ace Combat
- Platforms: PlayStation, mobile phone
- Release: PlayStation: JP: June 30, 1995; NA: September 9, 1995; EU: October 13, 1995; Mobile: JP: August 25, 2005
- Genre: Combat flight simulation
- Modes: Single-player, multiplayer

Air Combat (Note: Known in Japan as Ace Combat (エースコンバット, Ēsu Konbatto)) is a 1995 combat flight simulation video game developed and published by Namco for the PlayStation, and the first title of the Ace Combat franchise. Players control an aircraft and are tasked with completing a series of missions, with objectives ranging from destroying formations of enemies to protecting a specific target from enemy fire. Missions award money that is used to purchase new fighter aircraft, each with its own unique weapons and strengths.

Air Combat is based on a 1993 arcade game of the same name that ran on the Namco System 21 hardware. Company employees Masanori Kato and Kazumi Mizuno were tasked with bringing the game to the then-new PlayStation, but decided to create a new game from scratch after realizing the PlayStation's hardware was not powerful enough to properly render the arcade version's gameplay. Air Combat was both a critical and commercial success; its arcade-like gameplay, realism, and cinematic approach were praised, though several criticized its graphics and presentation for being below-average. It spawned the Ace Combat franchise with several sequels, spin-offs, and other forms of media, and was followed by Ace Combat 2 in 1997.

== Gameplay ==
The player firing a missile at an enemy

Air Combat is a combat flight simulation game presented in an arcade-like format. The player controls one of sixteen different aircraft, including the F-4 Phantom, Su-27 Flanker, and Lockheed F-117 Nighthawk, and must complete each of the game's seventeen levels, each having mission objectives that must be fulfilled. Missions range from destroying a squadron of enemies, protecting an allied base from enemy fire, or destroying a massive battleship. Completing missions awards the player money, which can be used to purchase new aircraft in their own personal hangar. Extra money can also be earned by destroying optional, "non-target" enemies.

Beginning at the game's fourth mission, a wingman can be employed that will help protect the player and fight alongside them. Additional wingmen can be hired by earning additional money during combat. The game progresses in a linear format. Alongside the main single-player campaign, there is also a split-screen multiplayer deathmatch mode, where two players attempt to destroy each other in the quickest time possible. Players can also unlock new aircraft and special minigames by completing specific objectives at various points throughout the game. Players can also swap between a first-person and third-person camera option.

== Plot ==
In 1995, a terrorist organization launches an insurrection against allied nations, specifically the Skully Islands in the fictional country of Usea. In response to attacks made across the globe, a mercenary air force is assembled to prevent the terrorist organization from seizing control of the government.

== Development and release ==
Air Combat was created by Namco designer Masanori Kato and producer Kazumi Mizuno. The two were commissioned by company executives to create a home port of the arcade game Air Combat for the then-new PlayStation console. The arcade game was published in 1993 for Namco's polygon-powered System 21 hardware, and is noteworthy for its 3D graphics and technological capabilities. Problems arose early in development for the home port, as staff did not believe the PlayStation's hardware was powerful enough to properly render the arcade version's gameplay. At the time, Namco primarily focused on developing ports of arcade games like Ridge Racer and Cyber Sled, which often contained content exclusive to their PlayStation releases. Believing console-exclusive features would give consumers more incentive to buy it, the team chose to scrap a straightforward port and instead create a new game based on the arcade game's core mechanics. The project planner, Asahi Higashiyama, believed the PlayStation's superior hardware could allow for more potential in the game and room for expansion.

Air Combat was released in Japan on June 30, 1995, as Ace Combat. It was released in North America on September 9 as a launch title for the console, and in Europe by Sony Computer Entertainment on October 13. On August 9, 1996, it was re-released in Japan under Sony's The Best budget title range. A version for Japanese mobile phones was released on August 25, 2005, for the EZweb content provider.

== Reception ==
Reception

Review scores
Publication	Score
AllGame	3/5
Edge	5/10
Famitsu	9/10, 8/10, 7/10, 7/10
GameFan	92/100
GamePro	3.5/5
IGN	7/10
Next Generation	3/5
PlayStation Official Magazine – UK	6/10
Coming Soon	3.5/5

Air Combat proved to be a commercial success. In Japan, the game sold over 246,000 copies in its first week, and nearly 600,000 overall. By 2008 the game shipped 2.23 million copies, making it the second best-selling game in the franchise behind Ace Combat 04: Shattered Skies. Electronic Gaming Monthly awarded it "Best Flight Sim of 1995".

Critics focused primarily on the gameplay, who felt it had an addictive, arcade-like nature. GameFan reviewer Nick Rox described it as being "easily the ultimate flight simulator". Writers from IGN, who compared it favorably to Warhawk, praised its action-packed gameplay, as did AllGame's Michael House and a reviewer from Coming Soon. House also liked the game's addictiveness and longevity. Famitsu's four reviewers thought Air Combat was fun and had much variety and action, but could have benefited from additional levels. Several argued the game started off at a slow and boring pace at the beginning, but became more fun after a while; GamePro wrote that patient players would "gradually get caught up in the gripping gameplay". In their brief coverage of the game in 1997, staff from Next Generation argued that the game did not hold up well in comparison to other games, saying that it was a decent flight sim but not as fun as its competitors. The controls were also praised, with Coming Soon and Famitsu saying it made it one of the most realistic flight sims for a console. Air Combat was also praised for its cinematic cutscenes, realistic sound effects, and amount of unlockables.

The graphics and presentation of Air Combat were seen as being below-average. House showed confusion towards this, due to Namco's other PlayStation games from the time having high-resolution graphics. IGN said the graphics, which they criticized for their constant flickering, were the game's weakest point, alongside its poor presentation. GamePro's Air Hendrix also criticized the visuals for being bland and unappealing. In contrast, GameFan and Coming Soon praised them for their realism and detail. Like IGN, Famitsu also stated the graphics were the game's low point, arguing that its arcade predecessor Air Combat 22 had much better visuals. Critics liked the game's mission variety in later levels for not simply repeating previous ones. AllGame in particular said that it gave the game much replay value for this reason, as did Famitsu. Hendrix thought they contained a level of polish, but criticized earlier levels for being too boring. The soundtrack also received praise, with House listing it among the game's best features.
