= Battleground of Europe =

The terms Battleground of Europe, Battlefield of Europe, and Cockpit of Europe have been used to describe:

- World War II Online: Battleground Europe, a 2006 release of the video game World War II Online
- Belgium, also known as the "crossroads of Europe".
- Italy, especially during the Italian Wars of the Renaissance
