= Enemy Engaged 2 =

2007 video game

- Developer(s): Gameyus Interactive
- Publisher(s): EU: G2 Games; NA: Strategy First
- Platform(s): Windows
- Release: EU: May 25, 2007; NA: July 10, 2007; AU: September 6, 2007
- Genre(s): Combat flight simulation
- Mode(s): Single-player, multiplayer

Enemy Engaged 2 is the sequel to Enemy Engaged: RAH-66 Comanche vs. KA-52 Hokum (EECH) and the third game in the Enemy Engaged series. It was developed by Serbian studio Gameyus Interactive in 2007. Though the sequel was improved in some ways compared to the previous game, it has been highly criticized for its lack of new features. Many improvements were already implemented in the modded version of EECH. Some commentators also felt it was not ready for release considering the large amount of bugs it contained. The biggest improvement can be seen in the efficient, modern-looking graphics of the game.

Unlike for EECH, the source code for Enemy Engaged 2 has not been released, the graphics system for it cannot be easily ported to EECH, and the EECH mods cannot yet be ported to Enemy Engaged 2 without it.

An expansion pack, Enemy Engaged 2: Desert Operations, was released in 2008.

== Reception ==
Reception

Aggregate score
| Aggregator | Score |
|---|---|
| Metacritic | 58/100 |

Review scores
| Publication | Score |
|---|---|
| Eurogamer | 5/10 |
| GameSpot | 6/10 |
| GameZone | 5.5/10 |
| PC Format | 79% |
| PC Gamer (UK) | 56% |
| PC Gamer (US) | 59% |
| PC Zone | 44% |

Enemy Engaged 2 received "mixed" reviews according to the review aggregation website Metacritic. The general consensus was that EECH modded was preferable to the sequel.

Eurogamer's Oliver Clare said: "Get hold of a copy of EECH (a fairly recent budget release means there's still plenty floating around) download and install the convenient 500MB mod compilation from www.eechcentral.com, and - hey[,] presto - you've got a game that looks as good as EE2 (in most respects at least) runs better, is more polished, and comes with tons more content. Bolstered with a bevy of visual and realism tweaks, a dozen extra campaigns, and a hangar of new flyables (all admittedly utilising the Apache and Havoc cockpit) the original EECH is more than a match for this rough-edged requel." GameSpot's Brett Todd summarized: "If you're happy with the original Enemy Engaged, stick with it. It's cheap, authentic, and can be modified into modernity with the loads of fan-made free content available online. But if you've never played the original game in the series, this might not be a bad starting point."

== See also ==
- Enemy Engaged: Apache vs Havoc
