= Jane's F-15 =

1998 video game

- Developer: EA Baltimore
- Publisher: Electronic Arts
- Director: Greg Kreafle
- Producer: Greg Kreafle
- Designer: Michael J. McDonald
- Programmer: John Paquin
- Artists: Max D. Remington III; Terrence Hodge
- Series: Jane's Combat Simulations
- Platform: Microsoft Windows
- Release: NA: March 25, 1998
- Genre: Combat flight simulator
- Modes: Single player, multiplayer

Jane's F-15, also known as simply F-15, is a combat flight simulator video game developed and released by Electronic Arts in 1998 for the PC. It models the McDonnell Douglas F-15E Strike Eagle. EA's 2000 Jane's F/A-18 used an improved version of F-15's game engine.

== Gameplay ==
A view of the 2D-cockpit.

The game has two campaigns: one based on the 1991 Gulf War and the other focusing on a fictional conflict with Iran.

The virtual cockpit was one of the first of its kind, but the game still featured a 2D cockpit which also allowed the player to switch between the pilot and the weapon systems officer seat in the back of the cockpit to monitor the different multi-functional displays.

== Reception ==
Reception

Review scores
Publication	Score
AllGame	4/5
CNET Gamecenter	8/10
Computer Games Strategy Plus	3.5/5
Computer Gaming World	4.5/5
GameSpot	9.2/10
GameStar	77%
Next Generation	4/5
PC Gamer (US)	93%
PC PowerPlay	85%
PC Zone	92%

The game received favorable reviews. Next Generation described the game for having fast-paced and hot-and-heavy air combat and challenging AI.

The game sold 126,461 units in the U.S. and earned $5 million by October 1999.

Jane's F-15 was a finalist for the Academy of Interactive Arts & Sciences' inaugural "PC Simulation Game of the Year" award, which ultimately went to Microsoft Flight Simulator 98. The game was also a finalist for Computer Gaming World's 1998 "Best Simulation" award, CNET Gamecenter's 1998 Best Combat Flight Sim award, and IGN's "Best Simulation of the Year" award, all of which ultimately went to European Air War. It was also a runner-up for Computer Games Strategy Plus' "Simulation Game of the Year" award, losing again to European Air War. The staff called the former "extremely impressive". PC Gamer US also nominated the game as the best simulation of 1998, but it lost to Falcon 4.0.
