= Apache Longbow =

Apache Longbow may refer to:

- Apache Longbow (video game), computer game released by Digital Integration
- The AH-64D variant of the AH-64 Apache, a twin-engine attack helicopter

== See also ==
- Longbow
