= Jane's Longbow 2 =

1997 video game

- Developer: Origin Systems
- Publisher: Electronic Arts
- Producer: Will McBurnett
- Designer: Tsuyoshi Kawahito
- Artist: Paul Stankiewicz
- Writers: Mike Francis; Tsuyoshi Kawahito; Graham Wood
- Composer: Joe Basquez
- Series: Jane's Combat Simulations
- Platform: PC (Windows)
- Release: NA: November 13, 1997
- Genre: Combat flight simulator
- Modes: Single-player, multiplayer

Longbow 2 is the sequel to Jane's AH-64D Longbow from Jane's Combat Simulations. The game was developed by Origin Systems with executive producer Andy Hollis on board, and released by Electronic Arts on November 13, 1997.

== Gameplay ==
2D cockpit view. The game also features a 3D cockpit with a Voodoo or a Voodoo Rush card.

This is a simulation game for PC where the player is a pilot of an AH-64D Apache Longbow helicopter. A fully dynamic campaign engine is used to create challenging missions and a random mission generator can be used to create a wide variety of missions. Gameplay is dynamic in the sense that new missions are generated automatically. The game features a command structure, allowing the player to command other helicopters, including OH-58 Kiowa scouts and UH-60 Black Hawk transports. The game's primary campaign features a fictional war between the United States and the Islamic Republic of Iran in which Iranian forces invade nearby Azerbaijan in early to mid 1990s.

== Longbow Anthology ==
Longbow Anthology was released in 1998 and is a compilation of Jane's AH-64D Longbow, the mission disk Flash Point: Korea (basically, Longbow Gold), and Longbow 2 in one box, with an abbreviated manual. Although compiled into one box, the games are still played as separate games, unlike Fighters Anthology which is all games of that series compiled into one playable game. All included simulators are fully patched to the latest versions.

== Reception ==
Reception

Review scores
Publication	Score
AllGame	5/5
Computer Gaming World	5/5
PC Gaming World	9.5/10

In the United States, the game sold 49,397 copies during 1997. Its total sales in the region reached 99,430 copies by October 1999, which drew in revenues of $3.89 million. The Longbow franchise as a whole, including the compilations and Jane's AH-64D Longbow, ultimately shipped above 1.2 million units.

Kenji Takeda of PC Gaming World was positive of the game. Robin G. Kim of Computer Gaming World summarized: "[...] the designers have created a benchmark sim far beyond its award-winning predecessor."

The Academy of Interactive Arts & Sciences nominated Longbow 2 for its inaugural "PC Simulation Game of the Year" award, but gave the prize to Microsoft Flight Simulator 98. However, Longbow 2 was named the best flight simulation of 1997 by Computer Games Strategy Plus, Computer Gaming World, GameSpot, CNET Gamecenter, PC Gamer US and the Computer Game Developers Conference. It was also a runner-up for Computer Games Strategy Plus's overall game of the year award, but lost to Myth: The Fallen Lords. The editors of Computer Gaming World wrote: "Authentic, exciting, immersive, and graphically dazzling, this is a sim that transcends its genre".

In 1998, PC Gamer declared it the 12th-best computer game ever released, noting its balance between realism and fun, and its campaign model and multi-player support.

== See also ==
- Team Apache
- Enemy Engaged: Apache vs Havoc
