= Jane's AH-64D Longbow =

1996 video game

- Developer: Origin Systems
- Publisher: Electronic Arts
- Director: Will McBurnett
- Producer: Andy Hollis
- Artist: Paul Stankie
- Composer: Barry Leitch
- Series: Jane's Combat Simulations
- Platforms: MS-DOS, Windows
- Release: June 3, 1996; April 2, 1997 (Windows)
- Genre: Combat flight simulation
- Mode: Single-player

AH-64D Longbow is a realistic combat flight simulation video game based on the AH-64D Apache Longbow attack helicopter. It was developed by Origin Systems for MS-DOS and released on June 3, 1996 by Electronic Arts. AH-64D Longbow is the second simulator released in the Jane's Combat Simulators line.

A mission disk Flash Point: Korea was released as an add-in in 1996, and a compilation pack, Longbow Gold was released in 1997. A sequel, Longbow 2 was released in late 1997 with Windows support. In 1998, Longbow Anthology was released, which includes the whole Longbow series.

== Gameplay ==
Cockpit view

The game had the most authentic flight model for a helicopter for its time and every aspect of the electronics systems was meticulously detailed. The weapons have realistic operational ranges and limits, and all friendly and enemy units arer based on their real-life counterparts. A wingman helps the player, and the player takes on Russian equipment in multiple single missions and campaigns, as well as a handful of historically accurate missions in which it is possible to 're-live' memorable battles.

Flash Point: Korea was released on November 30, 1996. It features a new campaign set in Korea, the addition of the co-pilot position, improved wingman commands and many bug fixes.

== Release ==
Longbow Gold came out in April 1997. It is a compilation pack featuring the AH-64D Longbow and Flash Point: Korea add-ons. It includes a Windows executable. Also included is the 3Dfx update, which adds a Glide renderer.

Longbow Anthology was released in 1998 and is a compilation of Jane's AH-64D Longbow, the mission disk Flash Point: Korea, and Longbow 2 in one box, with an abbreviated manual. A Limited Edition was also released, removing the campaign mode and marketed as a budget title.

== Reception ==
Reception

Review scores
Publication	Score
Next Generation	5/5
Computer Game Review	92/100
PC Games	A−

AH-64D Longbow debuted at No. 4 on PC Data's monthly computer game sales chart for June 1996. The game fell to position 14 the following month, before rising back into the top 10 in August and exiting the top 20 in September. In the United States, the game sold 106,423 copies and earned $4.78 million by October 1999. Global shipments of AH-64D Longbow ultimately surpassed 600,000 copies. The Longbow franchise as a whole, including the compilations and Jane's Longbow 2, shipped above 1.2 million units.

The reviewer for Next Generation praised the option to choose from nine different levels of realism, and the game's unique mission design.

Longbow was named the best flight simulator of 1996 by PC Gamer, GameSpot, Computer Gaming World and Computer Games Strategy Plus. CNET Gamecenter and the Computer Game Developers Conference nominated it in their "Best Simulation Game" categories, but these went to NASCAR Racing 2 and MechWarrior 2: Mercenaries, respectively. In 1996, Computer Gaming World ranked it as the 100th best game of all time for being "the first helicopter sim to match its fixed wing counterparts for realistic play". That same year, it was also ranked as the 73rd top game of all time by Next Generation, for being "an unbeatable marriage of graphics, gameplay, and armor-blasting fun".

=== Flashpoint Korea ===
The editors of PC Gamer US named Flashpoint Korea 1996's "Best Expansion Pack", and wrote that it "practically makes [Longbow] a whole new game". Flashpoint: Korea was also a finalist for Computer Gaming World's 1996 "Best Enhancement of an Existing Game" award, which ultimately went to Warcraft II: Beyond the Dark Portal.

== See also ==
- Apache and Hind, competitor games by Digital Integration
