= Fighter Bomber =

1989 video game

- European cover art
- Developer: Vektor Grafix
- Publishers: EU: Activision UK; NA: Accolade
- Designers: Andy Craven; John Lewis; Ciaran Gultnieks
- Programmers: Ian Martin; Peter Featherstone
- Artists: Derrick Austin; Mark Griffiths; John Guerin
- Composer: Paul Summers
- Platforms: Atari ST, Commodore 64, MS-DOS, Amstrad CPC, Amiga, ZX Spectrum
- Release: 1989
- Genre: Combat flight simulator
- Mode: Single-player

Fighter Bomber (released as Strike Aces in the USA) is a combat flight simulator developed by Vektor Grafix and released in 1989 by Activision UK for several platforms.

== Gameplay ==
In the game, the player participates in the annual Strategic Air Command Bombing and Navigation Competition at Ellsworth Air Force Base in South Dakota. Aircrews from around the world come here to compete against each other, undertaking three missions which are monitored and points are awarded. The best aircrew then receives the Curtis E. LeMay Trophy.

The player can choose between six different planes. After having selected the aircraft the player has to select a mission, and then appropriate weaponry for the selected mission from an array of weapons consisting of different types of missiles and bombs.

== Reception ==
Computer Gaming World in 1990 approved of the large variety of aircraft and the scenario editor, but criticized the graphics as inferior to that of competitors such as A-10 Tank Killer, and claiming to support sound card audio when only a few portions of music did so. The magazine concluded that "Strike Aces is not a bad product; it simply did not live up to its potential in execution". 1992 and 1994 surveys in the magazine of wargames with modern settings gave the game two and a half stars out of five.
