= AV-8B Harrier Assault =

1992 video game

- Amiga cover art
- Developer: Simis
- Publisher: Domark
- Platforms: Amiga, Atari ST, PC
- Release: 1992
- Genres: Combat flight simulator, real-time strategy
- Mode: Single-player

AV-8B Harrier Assault is a combat flight simulator/realtime strategy game developed by Simis and first published by Domark in 1992. An updated version using SVGA graphics was released later the same year, alternatively known as SVGA Harrier. In 1994, a modified version of the SVGA version was released for the classic Mac OS under the new name Flying Nightmares, which was later ported to 3D0.

In contrast to most simulators of the era, Harrier Assault puts the user in control of the overall battle, assigning missions to both air and ground forces. The game starts with a pre-rolled battle plan which the user can modify as the game progresses, or replace outright from the start. Some of the missions of the overall plan involve flying the Harriers, which the player can fly or leave to the computer.

== Setting and gameplay ==
The battle plan in progress displayed in the Tactical Amphibious Warfare Data System (TAWADS)

The game is set in a fictional conflict between United States forces and the Indonesian army occupying East Timor. A battlegroup led by USS Tarawa is diverted from a navy exercise along with its escorts and is ordered to aid the Rapid Deployment Force (RDF) Marine units engage the Indonesian forces and occupy the island. The carrier group is equipped with a squadron of 16 AV-8B Harrier II jets, a number of CH-46 Sea Knight and CH-53 Sea Stallion helicopters stationed on Tarawa and the escort vessels and a brigade of AAV-7A1 Amphibious Assault Vehicles, tanks and support vehicles aiding the marines and the special forces units.

The game is a cross between a real-time strategy game and a flight simulator. Players can completely ignore one of the elements and either play a pure real-time strategy game controlling the forces as the battle plan progresses, or alternatively participate only in combat, flying the AV-8B Harrier missions. In practice, however, tweaking the battle plan is essential as enemy reinforcements or lost ground battles can affect the plan as a whole. Similarly, flying some missions is essential, e.g. intercepting C-130 planes carrying enemy reinforcements, something that the game's AI cannot handle. Otherwise, enemy forces may overwhelm their target and re-establish control of strategic locations.

USS Tarawa command center

The game starts in the Tarawa command center, where a battle plan can be designed on the area maps. Players are given the choice of creating their own battle plans or loading the Ocean Sabre plan in the Tactical Amphibious Warfare Data System (TAWADS), containing navy/army deployments and operations spanning a five-day period. The battle plan contains information about the movement of navy, army and aerial units during each stage of the operation and needs to take into account all expected enemy strength at various points in the operation area (cities, villages, airports, fuel dumps, etc.). When the battle plan initiates, the first combat flying mission becomes available, where the player can attack a number of targets on the island. As the game progresses new missions become available, ranging from bombing enemy bases and vehicles, reconnaissance, air superiority, interception, and close air support of friendly units. The game ends when all enemy forces are destroyed and all strategic locations are occupied by friendly forces.

== Flight simulator ==
Harrier taking off from USS Tarawa

The game's flight simulator portrays the flying characteristics of an AV-8B Harrier II jet. The fighter plane can take off horizontally or vertically (when payload permits) from the deck of the USS Tarawa and land vertically when the mission ends. Inside the cockpit, the HUD and MFD provide combat information of enemy units along with aircraft and mission data and the point of view can be rotated left, right and back. There are two external camera views, one following the plane and a stationary flyby camera view, which displays a view of the aircraft as it speeds past the camera.

== PC versions ==
The PC version of the game was originally released with VGA resolution (320x200) graphics. A subsequent release in the same year upscaled the graphics to SVGA resolution (640x400), creating the very first SVGA flight simulator. The game in the SVGA release was re-branded to SVGA Harrier.

== Reception ==
Computer Gaming World wrote in 1993 that the game, "may well be the first successful integration of" the flight simulation and wargame genres, stating that the flight model was "one of the best available". Despite criticizing the many bugs, the magazine concluded that "HA is worth a look. There are enough innovations and hooks in the game to warrant spending some time". Stating in 1994 that "the graphic upgrade is the only functional difference between the first Harrier and SVGA Harrier", the magazine reported that the latter "has done a great job of conveying the feeling of flight", praising the "smooth" controls. Computer Gaming World however criticized the "poor" computer opponents, stated that the SVGA graphics upgrade was incomplete, cited many bugs, warned that the "simplistic user interface" and documentation made playing the otherwise excellent campaign "too much for many players to bear". The magazine recommended SVGA Harrier to flight simulation fans, but not to wargamers.

Harrier Assault was named the 84th best computer game ever by PC Gamer UK in 1997. The editors wrote, "The success of Domark's definitive Harrier flight sim hung on the depth and complexity of its enormous campaign".
