= Air Combat (arcade game) =

1993 arcade video game

- Developer: Namco
- Publisher: Namco
- Platform: Arcade
- Release: JP: February 1993; NA: August 12, 1993; EU: 1993
- Genre: Combat flight simulator
- Mode: Single-player
- Arcade system: Namco System 21

Air Combat (Note: Japanese: エアーコンバット, Hepburn: Eā Konbatto) is a 1993 combat flight simulator arcade video game developed and published by Namco. The arcade game was released in 1993 for the polygon-powered Namco System 21 arcade hardware, and received praise for its 3D graphics and technological capabilities. The game was a commercial success at Japanese and American arcades in the 1990s, and inspired several later Namco games, including the arcade sequel Air Combat 22, the PlayStation game Air Combat, and the Ace Combat series.

== Gameplay ==
The player is given the task of eliminating all 6 enemy aircraft within a minute. The only enemies in the game are bombers and fighter jets. Bombers are slower, and fighter jets are faster. The player is also given three options for difficulty: Cadet, Captain, and Ace. The differences between the modes are as follows:

- In Cadet mode, the player has to eliminate 3 bombers and 3 fighter jets
- In Captain mode, the player has to eliminate 2 bombers and 4 fighter jets
- In Ace mode, all of the enemy aircraft are fighter jets

== Release ==
The game debuted at Japan's Amusement Machine Operators (AOU) show in February 1993, and released in North America on August 12, 1993.

== Reception ==
The game was a commercial success in arcades. In Japan, Game Machine listed Air Combat as the most successful upright arcade cabinet of August 1993, and remained in the top spot in September. In the United States, the RePlay arcade charts ranked Air Combat as the top-grossing new video game of October 1993, and then the top-grossing deluxe arcade cabinet of December 1993. In 1997, Air Combat was still among the top 20 attractions at several locations, according to Funworld Magazine.

The game was critically acclaimed upon release. It received praise for its advanced 3D graphics and technological capabilities for its time, with the Gamest Awards in Japan nominating it in the "Best Graphics" category. Electronic Gaming Monthly gave the game a positive review, praising the "level of complexity, high degree of challenge, truly intense audio, and some of the coolest use of polygon graphics around". In a brief review, Computer and Video Games magazine called it "one of the most whizzo flight sims around" and "virtually the real thing". In another brief review, GameFan magazine called it "the best flight sim ever" in its December 1993 issue.

== Legacy ==
Namco's Ace Combat series has origins in the arcade game Air Combat. Air Combat was also notable for having advanced 3D polygon graphics for a combat flight simulator at the time. The game had a sequel, Air Combat 22, released for the Namco Super System 22 arcade hardware in 1995.

Namco designer Masanori Kato and producer Kazumi Mizuno were commissioned by company executives to create a home port of the arcade game Air Combat for the then-new PlayStation console. Problems arose early in development for the home port, as staff did not believe the PlayStation's hardware was powerful enough to properly render the arcade version's gameplay. At the time, Namco primarily focused on developing ports of arcade games like Ridge Racer and Cyber Sled, which often contained content exclusive to their PlayStation releases. Believing console-exclusive features would give consumers more incentive to buy it, the team chose to scrap a straightforward port and instead create a new game based on the arcade game's core mechanics. The project planner, Asahi Higashiyama, believed the PlayStation's superior hardware could allow for more potential in the game and allow room for expansion.
