= Sabre Ace: Conflict Over Korea =

1997 video game

- Developer(s): Eagle Interactive
- Publisher(s): Virgin Interactive
- Platform(s): Microsoft Windows
- Release: October 17, 1997
- Genre(s): Combat flight simulator
- Mode(s): Single-player, multiplayer

Sabre Ace: Conflict Over Korea is a video game developed by American studio Eagle Interactive and published by Virgin Interactive for Windows in 1997.

== Gameplay ==
Sabre Ace: Conflict Over Korea is a game featuring early jet fighters and aircraft with piston-engines used in the Korean War era.

== Development ==
The game was showcased at E3 1997.

== Reception ==
Next Generation reviewed the PC version of the game, rating it three stars out of five, and stated that "it is the vanilla nature of the gameplay that finally reduces Sabre Ace to an average experience rather than the superior one that its individual parts would make it seem."

== Reviews ==
- PC Zone #62 (1998 April)
- Computer Gaming World #163 (Feb 1998)
- PC Games - Dec, 1997
- PC Player (Germany) - Jan, 1998
- GameSpot - Nov 26, 1997
- GameStar - Jan, 1998
