= Fighter Duel =

1995 video game

- Developers: Philips Interactive; Jaeger Software
- Publisher: Philips Interactive
- Platform: MS-DOS
- Release: 1995
- Genre: Combat flight simulator

Fighter Duel is a first-person combat flight simulation game developed by Phillips Interactive and Jaeger Software released in Europe in 1995 for MS-DOS. The game is set during World War II.

== Gameplay ==
The player must shoot down enemy aircraft in duels in the air.

== Reception ==
Reception

Review score
Publication	Score
Computer Game Review	78/76/75

Computer Game Review gave Fighter Duel a mixed review, and called it "best suited for modem and network play." It was a runner-up for Computer Gaming World's 1995 "Simulation of the Year" award, which ultimately went to EF2000. The editors praised Fighter Duel's "superb modeling of top World War II fighters and its sweat-inducing head-to-head play."
