= Luftwaffe Commander =

1999 video game

- Developer: Eagle Interactive
- Publisher: Strategic Simulations
- Designer: David Kinney
- Platform: Microsoft Windows PC
- Release: 1999
- Genre: Combat flight simulator
- Modes: Single player, Multiplayer

Luftwaffe Commander is a Microsoft Windows-based World War 2 theme combat flight simulation created by Strategic Simulations, Inc. (SSI) and released in 1999 but copyrighted in 1998.

== Gameplay ==
The player enters a career as a Luftwaffe pilot on five fronts when playing in campaign mode, but first has to successfully train on a Heinkel biplane. The fronts featured in campaign mode are Spain, France, Britain, Russian Front and the Western Front. In single-player mode each campaign mission may be flown individually and each of the five fronts has ten missions. In the Air Combat mode or menu the player can choose to have a skirmish with himself, an A.I. wingman and other A.I. opponents of several dozen chosen enemy aircraft.

== Reception ==
The Philadelphia Inquirer said "Luftwaffe Commander features unique aircraft, including some never before seen in a computer game. However, an iffy flight model and graphics straight out of 1996 should relegate this one to the discount bin".
