= Air Conflicts: Pacific Carriers =

2012 video game

- Developer: Games Farm
- Publishers: bitComposer Games; Maximum Games
- Platforms: Microsoft Windows; Xbox 360; PlayStation 3; PlayStation 4; Nintendo Switch
- Release: 7 December 2012
- Genre: Combat flight simulation
- Mode: Single-player

Air Conflicts: Pacific Carriers is a 2012 combat flight simulation video game set in the Pacific Theater of World War II. It is part of the Air Conflicts series. The game was developed by Games Farm, published by Maximum Games and bitComposer Games, and released on 7 December 2012 for Microsoft Windows, Xbox 360 and PlayStation 3. It was ported to Nintendo Switch as part of a collection with Air Conflicts: Secret Wars in March 2019.

The game received mildly positive reviews. The graphics were praised, as was the initial, fun gameplay, but it was noted that the gameplay and music soon get repetitive.
