= Airforce Delta =

- Genre: Combat flight simulator
- Developer: Konami
- Publisher: Konami
- First release: Airforce Delta (1999)
- Latest release: Airforce Delta Alternative (2007)

Airforce Delta (エアフォース デルタ), known as Deadly Skies in Europe, is a series of combat flight simulation games developed and published by Konami. The series began in 1999 with Airforce Delta for Dreamcast, with its last main series game being the 2004 Airforce Delta Strike.

The series has been compared to Ace Combat in its gameplay.

== Games ==
Release timeline
1999	Airforce Delta
2000	Airforce Delta (GBC)
2001	AirForce Delta Storm
2002	AirForce Delta Storm (GBA)
2003
2004	Airforce Delta Strike
2005
2006
2007	Airforce Delta Alternative

=== Airforce Delta ===
Airforce Delta, known as Deadly Skies in Europe, was released in 1999 for the Dreamcast.

=== Airforce Delta (Game Boy Color) ===
A Game Boy Color version of Airforce Delta was released in 2000.

=== Airforce Delta Storm ===
Airforce Delta Storm (called Airforce Delta II in Japan and Deadly Skies in Europe), was released for Xbox in 2001.

=== Airforce Delta Storm (Game Boy Advance) ===
The Game Boy Advance version of Airforce Delta Storm was released in 2002, and has a plot based mostly on the previous game in the series, Airforce Delta.

=== Airforce Delta Strike ===
Airforce Delta Strike (called Airforce Delta: Blue Wing Knights in Japan and Deadly Skies III in Europe), was released for the PlayStation 2 in 2004.

=== Airforce Delta Alternative ===
Airforce Delta Alternative was a Japan-only mobile game released in 2007.
