= Top Gun: Danger Zone =

1991 video game

- Developer: Distinctive Software
- Publisher: Konami
- Series: Top Gun
- Platform: MS-DOS
- Release: 1991
- Genre: Combat flight simulator
- Mode: Single-player

Top Gun: Danger Zone is a combat flight simulator video game developed by Distinctive Software for MS-DOS and published by Konami in 1991 .

== Gameplay ==
Top Gun: Danger Zone is a combat flight simulator where the player has the opportunity to fly with training instructors, and is then able to compete against 12 classmates, while a split screen allows two players to fly simultaneously.

== Reception ==
The game was reviewed in 1992 in Dragon #181 by Patricia Hartley and Kirk Lesser in "The Role of Computers" column. The reviewers gave the game 2 out of 5 stars.
