= Microsoft Combat Flight Simulator =

1998 video game

Combat Flight Simulator: WWII Europe Series
- Developer: Microsoft
- Publisher: Microsoft
- Director: Dean Lester
- Designers: Rob Brown; Christina Chen; Jonathan Seal; Krishnan Shankar
- Programmers: Scot Bayless; Christina Chen; Todd Roberts; Krishnan Shankar; Eric Straub
- Series: Microsoft Flight Simulator
- Platform: Microsoft Windows
- Release: October 28, 1998
- Genre: Combat flight simulation game
- Modes: Single player, multiplayer

Microsoft Combat Flight Simulator: WWII Europe Series is the first version of all three combat flight simulation games from Microsoft. It was released on 28 October 1998 and it is set in the European Theatre of World War II. This game spawned two sequels: Combat Flight Simulator 2 in 2000 and Combat Flight Simulator 3: Battle for Europe in 2002.

== Gameplay ==
Combat Flight Simulator features 6 modes, Free Flight, Quick Combat, Single Missions, Campaigns, Multiplayer, and Training Missions. Free Flight allows players to fly around the entirety of Europe. Quick Combat puts the player into the air against waves of AI opponents. Single Missions are missions where you have to take-off to complete tasks, before landing. Campaigns are more elaborate mission sequences. Multiplayer was a mode that allowed you to fly online with other players, fly in formations, and engage in dog-fights. The multiplayer supported up to eight players via Internet Gaming Zone service. Training Missions are missions that teach you dogfighting techniques and the basics of flight.

== Reception ==
=== Sales ===
Combat Flight Simulator was a commercial success. It was the United States' 19th-best-selling computer game during the first half of 1999, and totaled 260,708 sales and $10.8 million revenues in the country by that October. The game's defeat of its direct competitor, Jane's WWII Fighters, contributed to the end of Electronic Arts' Jane's Combat Simulations brand.

Global sales surpassed 450,000 copies by June 2000.

=== Critical reviews ===
Reception

Review score
Publication	Score
PC Gaming World	8.4/10

Combat Flight Simulator was a finalist for Computer Gaming World's 1998 "Best Simulation" award, which ultimately went to European Air War.

== See also ==
- European Air War
- Jane's WWII Fighters
