= Air Conflicts: Aces of World War II =

2009 video game

- Developer: Cowboy Rodeo
- Publisher: Graffiti Entertainment
- Platform: PlayStation Portable
- Release: NA: 14 April 2009
- Genre: Combat flight simulation
- Modes: Single-player, multiplayer

Air Conflicts: Aces of World War II is a 2009 arcade-style combat flight simulation video game set in World War II. It was developed by Finnish studio Cowboy Rodeo and published by Graffiti Entertainment for the PlayStation Portable in 2009. It is the sequel to Air Conflicts (2006).

== Gameplay ==
The game features 13 campaigns with 240 missions in which the player can pick up the task of flying for the US Army Air Force, Royal Air Force, Luftwaffe, or the Red Army Air Force. The game features a multiplayer mode in which up to 8 players can participate through ad-hoc.

== Reception ==
The game received a poor 2/10 review from IGN, being summarized as "painful" and criticized for poor framerate during heavy fighting outside the Pacific Campaign. IGN also noted its clunky controls, imperfect hitboxes leading to munitions ignoring enemy targets, extremely long load times, poor menu design and extensive use of the PSP's battery.

Reviews from GameSpot are less critical of the game, mostly having problems with the difficulty of some gameplay parts and design choices. They praised the games dogfights and the amount of content and its variety. Overall GameSpot gives the game a moderate 6/10.

Reviews by Metacritic are relatively poor, at only 36%, with reviews citing poor load times, graphics, presentation, and lack of readable fonts, going so far as to describe the game as "unplayable."

It placed third on GameRant's list of Top 10 Worst Sony PSP Games.
