= Air Conflicts: Secret Wars =

2011 video game

- Box art of European PC version
- Developer: Games Farm
- Publishers: bitComposer: PAL: bitComposer; NA: Kalypso Media PlayStation 4; PAL: 2tainment; NA: U&I Entertainment Nintendo Switch; NA/EU: Kalypso Media
- Platforms: Windows; Xbox 360; PlayStation 3; PlayStation 4; Nintendo Switch
- Release: 30 June 2011: Windows; AU: 30 June 2011; EU: 8 July 2011; NA: 28 September 2011 Xbox 360; EU: 8 July 2011; AU: 4 August 2011; NA: 28 September 2011 (X360); NA: 8 November 2011 (PS3) PlayStation 4; PAL: 4 November 2016; NA: 4 April 2017 Nintendo Switch; EU: 22 March 2019; NA: 26 March 2019
- Genre: Combat flight simulation
- Mode: Single-player

Air Conflicts: Secret Wars is an arcade-style combat flight simulation video game set in World War I and II. It was developed by Slovak studio Games Farm and published by bitComposer Games for Microsoft Windows, Xbox 360 and PlayStation 3 in 2011. It is a sequel to the original Air Conflicts (2006). The game was ported to the Nintendo Switch in March 2019 as part of a collection with Air Conflicts: Pacific Carriers.

== Plot ==
The player controls a female pilot named Dorothy Derbec, nicknamed DeeDee, who is trying to solve the death of her father, Guillaume Derbec. Alongside with her friends Tommy Carter and Clive, the players progress through the game. From Tobruk to Russia to the Balkans and finally to Berlin, Tommy and Clive both die while progressing. In the Berlin campaign, she finds out that one friend killed her father in WW1 because her father couldn't stand watching bombers drop chemical gas on a village. While progressing, the player unlocks airplanes, ranging from classics such as the Spitfire to experimental planes like the Horten Ho 229.

== Reception ==
Reception

Aggregate score
Aggregator	Score		
Aggregator	PC	PS3	Xbox 360
Metacritic	65/100	51/100	61/100

Review scores
Publication	Score		
Publication	PC	PS3	Xbox 360
Destructoid	N/A	N/A	6.5/10
Gamekult	40/100	N/A	N/A
GameRevolution	N/A	N/A	6/10
IGN	N/A	N/A	6/10
PlayStation Official Magazine – UK	40/100	N/A	N/A
Official Xbox Magazine (UK)	N/A	N/A	60/100
PC Format	68/100	N/A	N/A

The Xbox 360, PlayStation 3, and Windows versions of the game both received "mixed or average reviews" according to the review aggregator Metacritic.
