= Joe Basquez =

American musician

Joe Basquez is an American songwriter, composer and musician from Austin, Texas. He is best known for his work at Origin Systems Inc, specifically, his compositions for Ultima Online in collaboration with Kirk Winterrowd.

== Video game credits ==
1993-2001 - Origin Systems Inc. (See credits below)

- A-10 (PC) - music and sound design
- Abuse (PC) - music
- ATF (PC) - music
- Bioforge Missions (PC) - SFX
- F-15 (PC) - Music
- Fighter Pilot (PC) - music
- Jane's Longbow 2 (PC) - music
- Prowler (3DO) - SFX and music
- Super Wing Commander (3DO) - SFX and music
- Ultima Online (PC) - Sound design and music (in collaboration with Kirk Winterrowd)
- Ultima Online: The Second Age (PC) - SFX
- Ultima Ascension (PC) - Sound design and SFX
- Wing Commander III (3DO) - Stream editing
- Wing Commander Prophecy (PC) - Sound design
- Wing Commander: Secret Ops (PC) - Audio Design
- Wing Commander: The Kilrathi Saga (PC) - Remastering

== Film/music credits ==
1990

- Ninth Life - Composer

2002

- American Spirit campaign - Composer

2003

- The Alamo - Supporting - Tejano
- Extra Notes - 13 Days at the Alamo - CD Release

2004

- Sin City - Supporting - Bartender
- A Scanner Darkly - Supporting - Undercover Cop
- J.F. Que? - Composer
- Idiocracy - Supporting - Prisoner
- The Quiet - Supporting" - Usher
- We Won It All Once - Principal - Jim Loney
- La Pastorela - Composer and Sound Designer

2005

- The Adventures of Shark Boy and Lava Girl -

Stand-In - George Lopez

- Oil Storm - Supporting - Ranch Hand
- Infamous - Supporting - Ranch Hand
- The Return - Supporting - Crony
- Los Aires del Senor Verde - Crew
- State vs Reed - Composer
- Blade of the King - Composer and Sound Designer
- Hello Officer!" - Composer
- The Reckoning - Composer
- Petra's Pecado - Composer and Sound Designer

2006

- Grindhouse - Supporting - Doctor
- Rosita's Jalapeno Kitchen - Sound Designer
- Petra's Cuento - Sound Designer

2007

- OMG! Zombies! - Composer
- I Am Not A Werewolf - Composer

2008

- Repentance - Composer
