= Red Jets =

2006 video game

- Developer: InterActive Vision
- Publisher: Graffiti Entertainment
- Platform: Windows
- Release: 2006
- Genre: Combat flight simulator

Red Jets is a 3D combat flight simulator, inspired by the Cold War conflict and the USSR Air Force. It was developed by InterActive Vision in 2004, and Graffiti Entertainment repackaged it and published it in North America in 2006.

== Gameplay ==
The player can fly four famous Soviet jets: the MiG-29 Fulcrum, Yak-141 Freestyle, Su-27 Flanker, and Su-25 Frogfoot. The game features relatively realistic flight physics and detailed cockpit and external views. Twenty missions and thirty scenarios come with the game. The landscapes were modelled from actual satellite maps. In addition, a detailed visual weather system to simulate flight in almost unlimited combinations of weather and day is included in the game. It also features a multiplayer mode, where up to 16 players could play simultaneously. The game also came with a mission creator, which was criticized for its lack of openness.
