= Dogfight (video game) =

1993 video game

Dogfight: 80 Years of Aerial Warfare
- Developer: MicroProse Leeds
- Publisher: MicroProse
- Producer: Peter Moreland
- Designers: Ciaran Gultnieks; Ian Martin; Dominic Robinson
- Artist: Derrick Austin
- Composer: John Broomhall
- Platforms: MS-DOS, Atari ST, Amiga
- Release: March 1993
- Genre: Combat flight simulator
- Mode: Single-player

Dogfight: 80 Years of Aerial Warfare is a combat flight simulator video game developed by MicroProse Leeds, formerly Vektor Grafix (originally as Air Glory) and published by MicroProse in 1993 MS-DOS, Atari ST, and Amiga. In North America, the game was released with the title Air Duel: 80 Years of Dogfighting.

== Gameplay ==
The game features simulation of aerial combat starting from World War I biplanes, through to modern fighter jets. There are several game modes to choose from such as 1-on-1 dogfights, missions in different theatres of battle, as well as a sandbox mode. Players can choose from first or third person perspective to pilot the aircraft. Included in the combat are strategy elements, such as resource management and mission planning.

== Reception ==
Computer Gaming World in 1993 criticized Air Duel's framerate, "generic and unrealistic" avionics, lack of Constantly Computed Impact Point, buggy AI, and low replay value. The magazine stated that it would have been better received in 1991, concluding that "Air Duel isn't bad, but it certainly isn't new or better." In a 1994 survey of wargames the magazine gave the title two stars out of five, stating that aircraft "do not seem historically correct ... A great idea with mediocre execution".
