= Hind (video game) =

1996 video game

- Developer: Digital Integration
- Publishers: Digital Integration (UK); Interactive Magic (US)
- Platforms: MS-DOS, Windows
- Release: October 7, 1996
- Genre: Flight simulator
- Modes: Single-player, multiplayer

Hind is a combat flight simulation game released by Digital Integration in 1996 for MS-DOS compatible operating systems and Microsoft Windows. It is the successor to Apache.

The game features the Soviet military Mi-24V Hind-E helicopter. It came with a detailed 99 page printed manual explaining the basics of helicopter flight and control, along with the specific traits of the Mi-24 helicopter and its weaponry.

== Gameplay ==
The game's graphics use Gouraud shading. Despite the primitive graphics, it has a realistic flight model. Many complex physics effects are modelled, including ground effect/vortex ring and retreating blade stall which culminate in the ability of a skilled pilot to succeed at autorotation in the case of all engine failure. Options are included to simplify the flight model for beginners.

The campaigns included in the game are based on real wars, but the missions involved are fictional.

Ground battles between individual soldiers can be seen taking place, since AI controlled infantry have been added. Soldiers can also be carried aboard the Hind helicopter and are a vital part of some missions.

If the player does nothing, an (almost) endless, semi-random war will be played out in each mission via a combination of scripted scenarios and very basic AI. The war can be passively watched using the features for zooming in on and moving between each active unit. It is possible to pass some missions this way, as the AI units on the players side are sometimes capable of achieving the objectives without help.

=== Game modes ===
From the main menu the player can choose single missions (playing either alone or in networked multiplayer), a campaign consisting of missions strung together or to undergo training at the Soviet airbase at Saratov. The training is very extensive and teaches the use of weapons and avionics systems, navigation, battle tactics, etc.

Combat can take place in three locales: Kazakhstan, Korea or Afghanistan. The Campaign mode features video clips as well as a detailed briefing before each mission, complete with a mission description, a detailed map and the ability to choose the desired ordnance.

The flight itself can be in novice mode, stable mode and realistic mode.

As with its predecessor, Apache, Hind has a cooperative multiplayer mode where two players can occupy the same helicopter, with one piloting the helicopter while the other manages weapons (as Weapons System Officer, or WSO).

It can be linked over IPX and analog modem networks with Apache Longbow, making it one of the first multiplayer, multisimulator games—something Digital Integration has trademarked as 'virtual battlefield'.

== Reception ==
Reception

Review scores
| Publication | Score |
|---|---|
| Computer Gaming World | 4/5 |
| GameRevolution | 4/5 |
| GameSpot | 8.5/10 |
| Next Generation | 4/5 |
| PC Gamer (UK) | 90% |
| PC Gamer (US) | 90% |
| PC Zone | 90/100 |
| Computer Games Strategy Plus | 5/5 |
| PC Games | A− |

The game received generally positive reviews. Both GameSpot and Next Generation said the selection of realism modes open up the game to players of all skill levels and inclinations. GameSpot reviewer Chet Thomas further praised the mission design for being appropriate to the intended uses of the real-world Hind, and complimented the AI, graphics, and head-to-head options. The Next Generation reviewer summarized that "as with Apache, if you're the least bit interested in flight sims Hind is a keeper." He noted that though the graphics are somewhat primitive, they are an improvement over Apache, and the primitiveness makes it one of the few good sims that can be played on an Intel 80486. He also deemed the ability to link up with Apache in head-to-head mode "a bold and welcome move". A GameRevolution critic said that both its best and worst features are its realism. He found the controls in all but the lowest realism mode to be excessively difficult for all but flight sim experts. He criticized that the use of polygons for the graphics makes objects hard to make out, but praised the selection of alternate camera views.

Hind was nominated as Computer Games Strategy Plus's and Computer Gaming World's 1996 simulation of the year, but lost both awards to Jane's AH-64D Longbow. In 1997, it was named the 30th best computer game ever by PC Gamer UK, whose editors called Hind a "seminal helicopter simulation".
