= Fighter Pilot (video game) =

1998 video game

- Developer: Charybdis Enterprises
- Publisher: Electronic Arts
- Platform: Windows
- Release: NA: October 15, 1998; EU: 1998
- Genre: Combat flight simulator
- Modes: Single-player, multiplayer

Fighter Pilot is a combat flight simulation game developed by Charybdis Enterprises and published by Electronic Arts for Windows in 1998.

== Gameplay ==
Fighter Pilot offers an arcade-style take on modern air combat, designed to ease beginners into the genre without overwhelming them with technical complexity. Set across 24 missions in the Middle East, players take on objectives ranging from destroying weapons caches in Iraq to escorting helicopters and confronting terrorists in Afghanistan. Each mission begins with a briefing from General Mervyn. Players choose from four aircraft—F/A-18 Hornet, F-117 Stealth, F-22 Raptor, and Su-35 Flanker. The game eschews traditional cockpit instrumentation in favor of a panoramic view. Flight physics are simplified to the point where crashing is nearly impossible unless done intentionally, and evading missiles is possible with sharp turns and flares. A flashing "SHOOT" prompt helps newcomers avoid wasting ammunition when a kill is guaranteed. Support aircraft like AWACS or EF-111 can be summoned with a single "call for help" command. Multiplayer offers some extended replayability.

== Development ==
The game was developed by Charybdis Enterprises, a company founded in June 1995. It was first mentioned in July 1998.

== Reception ==
Reception

Aggregate score
Aggregator	Score
GameRankings	48%

Review scores
Publication	Score
AllGame	2/5
Computer Games Strategy Plus	2/5
Computer Gaming World	2/5
GameSpot	4.6/10
GameStar	30%
Génération 4	1/6
IGN	5/10
PC Gamer (US)	31%
PC Games (DE)	51%
PC PowerPlay	71%
PC Zone	70%

The game received unfavorable reviews according to the review aggregation website GameRankings.

PC Gamer said "Fighter Pilot could have been a solid flight sim or an exciting action game, but without a clear direction one way or the other, all of its gameplay elements are too diluted to satisfy fans of either genre".
