= Project Wingman =

2020 video game

- Developer: Sector D2
- Publisher: Humble Games
- Producers: Abi Rahmani; Matthew Nguyen
- Programmers: Abi Rahmani; Nicholas Chalkley
- Artist: Abi Rahmani
- Writer: Matthew Nguyen
- Composer: Jose Pavli
- Engine: Unreal Engine 4
- Platforms: Microsoft Windows; Xbox One; Xbox Series X/S; PlayStation 5; PlayStation VR2
- Release: Microsoft Windows: WW: 1 December 2020; Xbox One: WW: 28 October 2021; PlayStation 5: WW: 3 October 2023
- Genre: Combat flight simulator
- Mode: Single-player

Project Wingman is a combat flight-action video game developed by Sector D2 and published by Humble Games. It was released on 1 December 2020 on Microsoft Windows with optional VR support for the whole game. It was later released on 28 October 2021 for the Xbox One, and on 3 October 2023 for the PlayStation 5. Titled Project Wingman: Frontline 59, the PlayStation 5 release includes 6 new missions with optional VR support. The same six missions were released as DLC for the Steam version on 1 December 2024, to celebrate the fourth anniversary of the game.

The game follows the story of a war set on an alternate Earth between United Cascadia and the Pacific Federation via a silent protagonist, a mercenary pilot for the fictional Sicario Mercenary Corps. After finishing up a previous contract, the mercenary group is hired by United Cascadia, a nation vying for independence from the Pacific Federation, also known simply as the Federation. The Federation comprises most of the Ring of Fire from California to Mongolia. Due to volatile tectonics, the area is rich with a fictional element called cordium, which is used for geothermal and military applications.

In addition to the campaign, there is a rogue-like "Conquest" gamemode wherein the player flies in missions across various territories for Cascadia, capturing territories, buying new planes, and hiring help, while the Federation gets progressively aware and cautious of the player's presence, sending fighters, airships, and ace squadrons to oppose the player.

== Gameplay ==
Project Wingman is a combat flight action game similar to the Ace Combat series in which the player flies a combat plane into battle and destroys enemy targets. The player can choose from a wide selection of planes inspired by real-life combat aircraft and equip the plane with special weapons. The player can choose to play in first-person (with or without the cockpit view) or third-person. Virtual reality (VR) and hands on throttle-and-stick (HOTAS) are supported.

In campaign mode, the player completes twenty-one missions, with objectives ranging from destroying enemy planes, annihilating ground forces and bases, and protecting allies. Completing a mission awards the player credits, which can be spent on new planes. The game's campaign follows a story in which the mercenary pilot Monarch fights for the Cascadians in their war of independence against the Pacific Federation in a future Earth previously devastated by a cascade of tectonic events in the Ring of Fire. There is a separate section for the Frontline 59 campaign, which plays similarly to the main campaign.

In Conquest mode, the player starts out with basic combat planes and must complete 43 missions in a single life. Mission types vary from hunting transport planes to destroying anti-air defenses. All missions end with a fight against an enemy ace squadron. Upon mission completion, the player receives credits and prestige, and the territory the mission took place in is conquered. Credits can be used to hire mercenaries and airships, and prestige can be used to buy new planes. The player's alert level determines the amount and type of enemies, and increases based on the amount of damage done to aircraft and ground defenses. If the player dies, everything except prestige and planes bought before is lost.

The player starts with trainer variants of the F-4 Phantom II- and MiG-21-inspired jets. All planes are equipped with flares and standard missiles, and can also be equipped with certain special weapons. More advanced planes offer, in place of flares, an angle of attack limiter toggle that grants supermaneuverability. Smaller planes can equip between one or two special weapons, while larger planes can equip between two or three, with the specific special weapons available being more advanced. Access to some of the planes requires the player to finish specific campaign missions, with some of the best planes only becoming available upon campaign completion. The difficulty setting or scores achieved during missions do not affect progression towards unlocking aircraft, aside from mission scores being a source of money.

== Synopsis ==
=== Setting ===
Project Wingman is set in an indeterminate future, several centuries after a global volcanic cataclysm known as the "Calamity" destroyed modern civilization, sparked a 150-year nuclear winter, and created multiple exclusion zones across Earth. By the year 432 AC (After Calamity), civilization has returned to levels comparable to and even surpassing its previous height, through the use of "cordium", a powerful and valuable energy resource discovered after the Calamity.

One of the world's superpowers is the Pacific Federation, a multinational political union centered around the Pacific Ocean that bases its power on control over the cordium deposits across the Ring of Fire. In recent years, however, tensions between member states have risen due to the Federation's imperialist policies, which have been fueled by the rich cordium deposits of United Cascadia, a member state located along the Pacific Northwest region of North America. Additionally, the Federation plans to cement its control over Cascadia to further exploit its resources. As a result, Cascadia declares independence from the Federation and starts an armed rebellion. Several private military companies such as the Sicario Mercenary Corps are hired by Cascadia in their war against the Federation.

The player controls the game's silent protagonist, a Sicario pilot with the callsign "Monarch" flying in the Hitman Team alongside Peter Kennedy (callsign "Diplomat") and Evelyn London III (callsign "Comic"). If the player selects a two-seat aircraft, Monarch is accompanied by WSO Robin Kuo (callsign "President"). Other members of Sicario include its primary AWACS operator Dominic Zaitsev (callsign "Galaxy") and the company's leader Arnold Frenken (callsign "Kaiser"), who is also a pilot and leader of the Assassin Team.

In the DLC mini-campaign Frontline 59, the story follows Division K-9, a squadron of Federation reserve pilots who are unexpectedly called to duty to make up for the Federation's losses suffered in their rapidly escalating war with Cascadia. The squadron consists of the player character "Driver", pilots "Brick", "Bookie", "Cobb", and Driver's WSO "Eye-Tee". They are commanded by the Federation AWACS "Vita".

=== Plot ===
After finishing their contract with the Creole Republic, the Sicario Mercenary Corps is hired by Cascadia amid their war of independence against the Pacific Federation. The Federation has gained the upper hand in the early stages of the war, to the point of capturing the Cascadian capital city of Presidia.

However, the Hitman Team slowly turns the tide of the war in Cascadia's favor, as the Federation begins losing support due to their war crimes being brought to light and their inability to control Cascadia. The Hitman Team becomes a rallying point for Cascadian forces because of their immense successes in repelling Federation forces, which earns them the attention of the Federation's Crimson Team, a fighter squadron of elite peacekeeper pilots. The air war culminates in a massive aerial dogfight between Federation and Cascadian forces over the Bering Strait; during the battle, Crimson is deployed to stop Hitman but is forced to retreat after Hitman inflicts too many losses, leaving Crimson's leader, Crimson 1, enraged and vowing revenge against Monarch.

During a subsequent mission to liberate Prospero, Cascadia's main economic hub, the Federation bombards the city with cordium-enriched cruise missiles when Cascadian victory seems imminent. The warheads activate Prospero's rich cordium deposits, causing a massive underground volcanic chain reaction. This destabilizes the Ring of Fire and ravages most of the Pacific Rim in the resulting tectonic event. Having lost communications with allied forces in the chaos, Hitman withdraws but is intercepted by a team of bounty hunters led by Klara Rask (callsign "Frost Druid"), who reveals that Hitman's true identities have been leaked to the public. Hitman shoots down the bounty hunters and re-establishes communications with Sicario, planning to leave Cascadia behind, but their Cascadian liaison officer offers them an undisclosed deal in exchange for their continued support. Sicario accepts the deal and continues to fight, while their leader Kaiser travels abroad to rally supporters for their cause.

Sicario assists the Cascadians with eliminating Federal resistance and re-stabilizing the country, and Hitman defeats Crimson in a dogfight above a devastated Prospero. During the last major battle of the war to liberate Presidia, both sides of the conflict agree to a ceasefire as Cascadia emerges victorious, but Crimson 1 suddenly arrives in a hijacked prototype super-fighter, the "Project Wingman". Overcome with madness from the war and the loss of his squadron, he detonates several cordium-enriched warheads, devastating Presidia and incapacitating Hitman Team except for Monarch. Crimson 1 holds Monarch responsible for the escalation of the war and challenges him to a duel, but is ultimately shot down by Monarch, ending the war as the surviving Federation and Cascadian forces spectate. Hitman, having ejected from their planes, are rescued by Sicario's SAR unit, and the remaining Federation forces fear their summary execution on suspicion of breaking the ceasefire.

After the war, Cascadia honors their deal with Sicario. The whereabouts of the Hitman Team, including Monarch, are unknown; the Federation declares them wanted criminals for their part in the war, though it is implied that they have assumed new identities as part of the deal. Having suffered irreplaceably high casualties and the immense loss of reputation from using cordium weapon of mass destruction, the Federation faces multiple insurgent movements from other member states, backed by the now-independent Cascadia (now a haven for mercenaries) among other foreign powers.

=== Frontline 59 ===
Set concurrent to the main plot, reservist squadron K-9 is activated in an emergency mobilization and ordered to join the battle over the Bering Strait, despite their inexperience. However, they are too late to join the battle and are forced to protect retreating Federation forces instead, resulting in them saving Crimson Squadron. In light of the massive losses they suffered, the Federation mobilizes the reserves of the frontline territory of Magadan, as Cascadia stages an amphibious invasion into eastern Siberia led by General Faust. Despite K-9 and Peacekeeper Squadron Steel Team inflicting heavy losses on the Cascadians, they cannot stop the invasion and are forced to retreat inland.

Over the next month, K-9 participates in defensive operations, buying enough time for the main Federation forces to regroup. The turning point comes when Driver performs a daring raid through an underground tunnel, destroying the Cascadian headquarters and putting the entire invasion force in disarray. The fully assembled Federation forces then drive the Cascadians back to the coast, refusing all offers of ceasefire. The main Cascadian invasion force is destroyed and the Federation begins their invasion of Cascadia. However, instead of being deactivated as planned, K-9 is sent to stop a last-ditch attack by General Faust targeting Magadan's largest geothermal plant.

Driver destroys Faust's airship and kills her before she can attack the geothermal plant. As her airship explodes, Faust warns of a terrible secret that was found in Oceania in the last war that the mercenaries consider "holy", and which will destroy either the Federation or Cascadia. The mission is completed just as K-9 witnesses a flight of cordium-enriched cruise missiles flying overhead toward Prospero.

Afterward, due to their role in repelling the Cascadian invasion of Magadan, Driver is put into consideration to be promoted to a full-fledged Peacekeeper.

== Development ==
Abi Rahmani started Project Wingman as a portfolio piece in November 2015. In 2017, Project Wingman became a full-time project after receiving an Epic Games Unreal Dev Grant. Fans donated to the game's Kickstarter campaign, raising AU$114,544 and exceeding its goal of AU$35,000. Story mode was confirmed by the development team, but cutscenes were not included due to being outside of the Kickstarter budget. Project Wingman's release date was originally stated for summer 2020 before it was pushed back to early 2021, but the release date was moved to 1 December 2020, due to development proceeding faster than expected.

Project Wingman was later ported and released on Xbox One on 28 October 2021. The game was also released on the online PC game store GOG.com on March 28, 2022.

== Reception ==
Reception

Aggregate score
Aggregator	Score
Metacritic	75/100

Review scores
Publication	Score
PC Gamer (US)	78/100
TheGamer	4/5
Screen Rant	3.5/5

Project Wingman received "generally favorable reviews" from critics, according to review aggregator Metacritic. Critics have praised the game for its audio and visual feedback.

Polygon's Charlie Hall praised the game for its action that can be commonly found in modern first-person shooters. TheGamer's Sean Murray noted the game's improvement on the Ace Combat formula by allowing players to equip multiple weapons and adding a rogue-like conquest mode, but he criticized the game's lack of mission variety due to being "go here, shoot things".

== See also ==
- Cascadia movement
- Private military company
- Yellowstone Caldera
