= Jane's USAF =

1999 video game

- Developer(s): Pixel Multimedia
- Publisher(s): Electronic Arts
- Director(s): Ramy Weitz
- Producer(s): Sharon Rozenman
- Designer(s): Aviv Yam-Shahor; Anat Rabinovich
- Programmer(s): Shai Almog; Tal Raviv; Gary Kshepitski; Ady Shimony
- Artist(s): Oren Gal
- Composer(s): Don Veca
- Series: Jane's Combat Simulations
- Platform(s): Microsoft Windows
- Release: October 19, 1999
- Genre(s): Air combat simulation
- Mode(s): Single-player, Multiplayer

Jane's USAF: United States Air Force is a combat flight simulation video game developed by Israeli studio Pixel Multimedia and released in 1999 as part of Jane's Combat Simulations series. The game is set from the late 1960s to the early 2000s and it is a jet aircraft survey simulation featuring satellite imagery for terrain which allowed quite detailed graphics for the time of the release of Jane's USAF. The game features four campaigns: the Vietnam War, Persian Gulf War, and two fictional campaigns, one based on the Red Flag exercises and one depicting a war between NATO and Russia over Germany in the then-future of 2005. Also included are single missions, with maps from the Middle East to Korea. Training missions include take-off, landing, and refuelling in Nellis Air Force Base.

== Reception ==
Reception

Aggregate score
Aggregator	Score
GameRankings	83%

Review score
Publication	Score
PC Gaming World	8/10

USAF was a runner-up for Computer Gaming World's 1999 "Simulation of the Year" award, which ultimately went to MiG Alley. It was also a finalist for Computer Games Strategy Plus's 1999 "Simulation Game of the Year" award, losing again to MiG Alley. The editors wrote: "All is forgiven for IAF, Pixel Multimedia’s last sim. With USAF, they deliver terrific gameplay and lots of options in this rah-rah All-American sim that's a great choice for beginners and experts alike".
