= Air Conflicts =

2006 video game

- Front cover
- Developer: 3Division Entertainment
- Publisher: Frogster Interactive
- Platform: Microsoft Windows
- Release: April 2006
- Genre: Combat flight simulation
- Modes: Single-player, multiplayer

Air Conflicts is an arcade-style combat flight simulation video game set in World War II. It was developed by 3Division Entertainment and published by Frogster Interactive for Microsoft Windows in April 2006.

== Gameplay ==
The player controls a plane whose allegiance is one of three World War II nations: UK, USSR, or Nazi Germany. The game ignores factions such as USA, Japan, and Italy. Each nation has several unique fighter planes which are collected and then used during the campaign. The campaign spans the entire course of the war. During the single-player campaign the player earns stats, achievements, new planes, and commendations.

The game also comes with multiplayer for Internet TCP/IP. Up to 8 players can play at once. All the planes can be chosen and different skins can be added for personal customization. Both Deathmatch and Team Deathmatch are available game styles.

There is a large variety of multiplayer and single-player maps and locations to play in. There is a lack of voice-over in the game and instead focuses on machine sounds and music.

== Other games ==
The game has several spinoffs, including Air Conflicts: Vietnam in 2014. Air Conflicts: Aces of World War II was released in 2009, Air Conflicts: Secret Wars in 2011, and Air Conflicts: Pacific Carriers in 2012, creating a trilogy of Air Conflicts games.
