= JetFighter II: Advanced Tactical Fighter =

1990 video game

- Developer: Velocity Development
- Publisher: Velocity Development
- Platform: MS-DOS
- Release: 1990
- Genre: Combat flight simulator

JetFighter II: Advanced Tactical Fighter is a combat flight simulation game developed and published by Velocity Development. It was released for MS-DOS in 1990.

== Gameplay ==
JetFighter II: Advanced Tactical Fighter is a game in which the F23-D Advanced Tactical Fighter (ATF) equipped with stealth technology is added to three other jets from the original game: the F-14 Tomcat, the F/A-18 Hornet and the F-16 Falcon.

== Reception ==
Jim Hoover reviewed the game for Computer Gaming World, and stated that "In summary, for those who do not have the privilege of attending the U.S. Navy's flight school in Pensacola, Florida, this will probably be the closest they will ever get to landing on a carrier in a high-performance jet. Jetfighter II: Advanced Tactical Fighter does a great job of simulating both the difficulty and exhilaration a pilot experiences once he finally places his jet on the carrier deck and comes to a screeching halt after catching the 'three wire.'"

David Upchurch for ACE (Advanced Computer Entertainment) rated the game 935 and said "Ideal for green rookie or grizzled veteran. Now recruits can instantly practice flight, taking off or landing in conditions as simple or as complex as required, while the varied missions would keep even the infamous Baron Richthofen busy for a couple of months. If you don't fancy tackling the Adventure, you can practice any of the 125 (count 'em - I did) missions."

Julian Boardman for Raze rated the game 85% and said "There is nothing in the gameplay to make it stand out from other flight sims, it is neither better nor worse than any other. However, the graphics really do warrant a viewing. After all, if you're going to get a flight simulation, you may as well get one with great graphics."

A 1992 survey in Computer Gaming World of wargames with modern settings gave the game three and a half stars out of five.

== See also ==
- Falcon 4.0
