= Jane's WWII Fighters =

1998 video game

- Developer: Jane's Combat Simulations
- Publisher: Electronic Arts
- Director: Beth Comstock
- Producer: Steven Matulac
- Designers: Nathan Cummins; David Luoto
- Programmer: Ken Allen
- Artists: Terry Fowler; Nicholas Corea; Chuck Eyler; Jem Geylani
- Composer: Don Veca
- Series: Jane's Combat Simulations
- Platform: Microsoft Windows
- Release: NA: November 23, 1998; EU: 1998
- Genre: Air combat simulation
- Modes: Single-player, Multiplayer

Jane's WWII Fighters (sometimes referred to as Jane's World War II Fighters) is a 1998 combat flight simulation video game. Set in the European theatre of operations during World War II, it is part of the Jane's Combat Simulations franchise. The game was considered a commercial failure, and contributed to the end of the Jane's Combat Simulations line.

== Gameplay ==
The game is set in the European theater during WWII throughout 1944 into 1945. The game features famous fighter aircraft from World War II. It also included a virtual museum, where aircraft profiles and interviews with fighter pilots such as George Unwin, Günther Rall, and others could be viewed.

== Reception ==
=== Critical reviews ===
Reception

Aggregate score
Aggregator	Score
GameRankings	78%

Review scores
Publication	Score
CNET Gamecenter	8/10
Computer Games Strategy Plus	3.5/5
Computer Gaming World	4.5/5
GamePro	4.5/5
GameSpot	9/10
IGN	8/10
PC Gamer (UK)	85%
PC Gamer (US)	84%

The game received favorable reviews according to the review aggregation website GameRankings.

=== Sales ===
The game was released in direct competition with Microsoft Combat Flight Simulator, and became a commercial flop. In 1999, Computer Gaming World reported that the game "appears to have been murdered by Microsoft's brand recognition". Its lifetime sales in the U.S. reached 60,943 copies by October 1999, which drew revenues of $2.58 million. Speaking anonymously to Bruce Geryk of GameSpot, an ex-staffer for Origin Systems remarked that the game "spent some serious cash, and did not sell". He attributed its failure to Combat Flight Simulator's dominance of the World War II flight simulation field during 1998, and called the game's performance "the death knell for Jane's products", after which the brand unraveled. Following the May 2000 bankruptcy of Jane's Attack Squadron developer Looking Glass Studios shortly before that game's completion, Electronic Arts declined to finish the project, and instead opted to exit the flight simulation genre.

For the week ending April 29, 2000, the game appeared at No. 10 on PC Data's weekly computer game sales chart in the United States, with an average retail price of $25. It climbed to No. 8 the following week, before exiting the charts for the May 7–13 period. PC Data named it the country's ninth-best-selling game of May 2000. By October, its sales in the region had reached 166,971 units for the year 2000 alone, which accounted for $2.5 million in revenue. Mark Asher and Tom Chick of Quarter to Three remarked that the game "did a good job of trying to convince us that flight sims aren't dead" that year.

=== Awards ===
The Academy of Interactive Arts & Sciences nominated the game for "PC Simulation Game of the Year" at the 2nd Annual Interactive Achievement Awards, although it lost to Need for Speed III: Hot Pursuit. It was also a finalist for Computer Gaming World's 1998 "Best Simulation", CNET Gamecenter's 1998 Best Combat Flight Sim, GameSpot's "Simulation of the Year" and IGN's "Best Simulation of the Year" prizes, all of which ultimately went to European Air War. The game received further runner-up positions for "Best Soundtrack" and "Best Graphics" from IGN, and "Best Sound" and "Best Graphics (Technical Excellence)" from GameSpot. However, it won Computer Gaming World's "Special Award: Musical Score" prize. The magazine's staff wrote of the game having excellent aircraft graphics, special effects, challenging AI, and accurate flight model, also calling its multiplayer as blast to play.

== See also ==
- Microsoft Combat Flight Simulator
- European Air War
