= Flying Nightmares =

1994 video game

- North American Macintosh cover art
- Developers: Simis Limited; Likelike Productions (3DO)
- Publisher: Domark Software, Inc.
- Producer: John Kavanagh
- Designers: Chris Tubbs; David W. Payne; Jonathan Newth
- Programmer: Colin Boswell
- Artists: Alan Tomkins; Tony West
- Writer: Doug Richardson
- Platforms: 3DO Interactive Multiplayer; Macintosh
- Release: Macintosh: NA: 1 January 1994; 3DO: NA: 1 January 1995; EU: 1995
- Genre: Combat flight simulator
- Mode: Single-player

Flying Nightmares is a flight simulator published by Domark for the Power Macintosh running classic Mac OS. It was a port of the almost identical IBM PC version, SVGA Harrier. It was one of the first commercial PPC native games. It was later ported to the 3DO by Lifelike Productions.

Released on compact disk, it was notable for having a 10 MB introduction video that was not based on actual in-game footage, while the game itself was only 3 MB and was based on SVGA graphics ported from the PC.

== Gameplay ==
Flying Nightmares is a combat flight simulator in a Harrier jump jet. It is combined with a theatre-scale strategic layer.

== Reception ==
Reception

Review scores
Publication	Score
Next Generation	3/5 (3DO)
Power Unlimited	72%

Next Generation reviewed the 3DO version of the game, rating it three stars out of five, and stated that "this is as good as the 3DO is likely to see, but still not recommended for everyone."
