= Vektor Grafix =

British video game developer (1987–1993)

MicroProse Leeds
- Formerly: Vektor Grafix (1987-1992)
- Type: Video game developer
- Industry: Video games
- Founded: June 1987; 39 years ago
- Defunct: 1993
- Headquarters: United Kingdom
- Key people: John Lewis; Ian Martin; Andy Craven
- Products: Combat flight simulators
- Parent: MicroProse (1992-1993)

Vektor Grafix was a British video game developer led by John Lewis and Andy Craven. Vektor Grafix was founded by Craven and Danny Gallagher in June 1987.

== History ==
In June 1987, Andy Craven, who was a former college lecturer, along with Danny Gallagher, formed the computer game developer Vektor Grafix, specifically developing 3D video games.

Their first releases were home ports of the Star Wars arcade video games, which were best-sellers for Domark. After the success of the games, Gallagher in 1988 left to be a freelance developer, creating Voyager for Ocean Software and Infestation for Psygnosis, leaving Andy Craven to run the company.

The company became a major success developing 3D titles, pushing computer graphics to the limits. In 1990, the company begin development on Shuttle: The Flight Simulator, for Virgin Mastertronic, which was released in 1992. In 1991, the company begin development on a flight simulator, Death or Glory, an aerial flight simulator, which was later released as B-17 Flying Fortress.

The Leeds-based company then went on to become a developer of mostly 3D simulation games and was eventually bought by MicroProse in July 1992, becoming their development studio as MicroProse Leeds. The company was dissolved in 1993 as part of the company's financial troubles that led to its sale of MicroProse to Spectrum HoloByte. Many team members, including Ciaran Gultnieks, Mark Griffiths and Ian Martin left to form The Software Refinery to develop Slipstream 5000 and Hardwar for Gremlin Interactive, and Psygnosis' studio in Stroud.

== Games ==
- Star Wars (ports, 1987)
- Star Wars: The Empire Strikes Back (ports, 1988)
- Ring Wars (1988)
- Fighter Bomber / Strike Aces (1988)
- Killing Cloud (1991)
- Shuttle: the Space Flight Simulator (1992)
- B-17 Flying Fortress (1992)
- Dogfight (1993)
