= Airforce Delta Strike =

2004 video game

- PlayStation 2 cover art.
- Developer: Konami Computer Entertainment Studios
- Publisher: Konami
- Artist: Jun Tsukasa
- Series: Airforce Delta
- Platform: PlayStation 2
- Release: NA: February 3, 2004; JP: February 5, 2004; EU: May 14, 2004
- Genre: Flight simulator
- Mode: Single-player

Airforce Delta Strike, known as Airforce Delta: Blue Wing Knights (エアフォースデルタ ブルーウイングナイツ, Eafōsu Deruta Burū Wingu Naitsu) in Japan and Deadly Skies III in Europe, is the third installment in the Konami Airforce Delta series. It was released in 2004 exclusively on the PlayStation 2. It plays very similarly to the previous Airforce Delta games.

== Story ==
The game plot occurs in an unspecified time in the future, featuring sci-fi weapons, planes and environments. When OCC (Orbital Citizen Community), a space colony set on Earth's orbit, rebels and launches an invasion of Earth, EDAF (Earth Defense Allied Forces) launches a defensive campaign. EDAF is overwhelmed by the OCC's superior weapons and numbers early in the war, losing a majority of its conventional forces and is forced to enlist any militia forces to help, including the Delta Squadron, an ill-famed aerial strike group known as a "dumping ground" for disgraced or misfit pilots. Despite their differences, Delta Squadron's efforts allow the EDAF to turn the tide and liberate portions of Earth occupied by the OCC, earning them the attention and rivalry of the OCC's elite experimental squadron. As the tide starts to turn and as the Earth forces advance, they find out that OCC is not the major threat - an organization from Mars is planning to destroy Earth with the help of the orbital colony.

== Gameplay ==
AFDS features a large selection of planes to choose from and a series of missions to play through. However, unlike the previous installments, AFDS features an all new cast of anime-style characters illustrated by Jun Tsukasa. Some can be played as and others are just for support. Each character has a unique selection of planes to fly and has a different branch of missions to complete. Completion of some missions unlocks secret missions and hidden planes for replays.

After the game is once completed, a secret hangar becomes available. As the game is completed and medals are earned, more secret planes become available.

== Reception ==
Reception

Aggregate score
Aggregator	Score
Metacritic	66/100

Review scores
Publication	Score
Computer Games Magazine	2.5/5
Electronic Gaming Monthly	4.33/10 (Note: Two critics of Electronic Gaming Monthly gave the game each a score of 3.5/10, and the other gave it 6/10.)
Famitsu	29/40
Game Informer	7/10
GameSpot	6.5/10
GameSpy	3/5
GameZone	6.5/10
IGN	6.4/10
Official U.S. PlayStation Magazine	3/5
X-Play	3/5

The game received "average" reviews according to the review aggregation website Metacritic. In Japan, Famitsu gave it a score of one seven, two eights, and one six for a total of 29 out of 40. Henry Ernst of GamePro Germany criticised that the game does not make fun and that the "multi-million dollar jet handles like a wild goose that has had a load of buckshot thrown at it in the belly - extremely reluctantly." (Note: GamePro Germany gave the game a fun factor of 53/100, 50/100 for grafic, 65/100 for controls, 58/100 for sound and 63/100 for atmosphere.) Atomic Dawg of the U.S. version of GamePro, however, said, "The visuals are sharp and clean all around, and the game features plenty of slick aircraft shots and beautiful skylines." (Note: GamePro gave the game two 4/5 scores for graphics and control, 3/5 for sound, and 3.5/5 for fun factor.)
