= Air Conflicts: Vietnam =

2013 video game

- Developer: Games Farm
- Publisher: BitComposer Entertainment
- Series: Air Conflicts
- Platforms: Microsoft Windows, PlayStation 3, PlayStation 4, Xbox 360
- Release: 26 November 2013
- Genre: Flight simulation

Air Conflicts: Vietnam is a 2013 flight simulation video game in the Air Conflicts series developed by Games Farm and published by BitComposer Entertainment for PlayStation 3 and Xbox 360, and Microsoft Windows. An Ultimate Edition of the game was released for PlayStation 4 in 2014.

== Gameplay ==
The player must take down the enemy pilots in order to win each level.

== Development and release ==
The developers aimed to create a game which players could "pick up and play" without requiring a large time investment. The game was released for PlayStation 3 and Xbox 360 on November 26, 2013. In 2014, the developers announced that an 'Ultimate Edition' of the game would be released exclusively on PlayStation 4 that year, an edition which would include a new campaign and other improvements to the game. This edition was released on June 27, 2014.

== Reception ==
Reception

Aggregate score
Aggregator	Score
Metacritic	43%

The game received generally unfavorable reviews. Nevertheless, it was given an award at Booom Contest for being the best 2013 video game developed in Slovakia.
