= AirForce Delta Storm =

2001 video game

- Developers: Konami Computer Entertainment Studios (Xbox); Mobile21 (GBA)
- Publisher: Konami
- Director: Toshiyasu Kamiko
- Platforms: Xbox; Game Boy Advance
- Release: Xbox: NA: November 15, 2001; JP: February 22, 2002; EU: April 12, 2002; Game Boy Advance: NA: September 16, 2002; JP: September 26, 2002; EU: November 1, 2002
- Genre: Flight simulator
- Mode: Single-player

Airforce Delta Storm, known as Airforce Delta II (エアフォース デルタII, Eafōsu Deruta Tsū) in Japan and simply as Deadly Skies (same as the first game) in Europe, is a fighter jet video game developed by Konami Computer Entertainment Studios released in 2001 for the Xbox. It is the sequel to the Sega Dreamcast game Airforce Delta.

A game also named Airforce Delta Storm developed by Mobile 21 was released in 2002 for the Game Boy Advance. While having the same name, this game's plot is based on the previous title in the series, Airforce Delta.

== Story ==
The story of Airforce Delta Storm is set in a 20X1-20X7 time when scientific technology has reached an all new level and the ability to cure almost all human diseases has become a reality. However, as a result, the Earth has become overpopulated and basic necessities are becoming scarce. In the midst of the growing epidemic, those nations that are highly industrialized but not producing enough food for themselves banded to form the "United Forces" and use their military advantage to seize agricultural lands whereas those nations that are under the threat of United Forces invasion have pooled their resources to form the "Allied Forces".

== Gameplay ==
The gameplay of AirForce Delta Storm is very similar to its predecessor Airforce Delta in the sense that the player controls various aircraft to engage enemies and accomplish missions. A new feature of the sequel is the 'World Map' where the player moves his aircraft across the map through various checkpoints and flies to a mission. Some of these checkpoints can be 'recaptured' by the enemy so the player must make careful account of how much 'Range' his aircraft has; 'Range' allows the player to continue across the map without having to deal with enemy forces. When the player locates the mission on-screen they fly their aircraft towards the mission icon (either a land-based structure or a ship) and select it.

There are three levels of controls, ranging from Novice, which allows the player to pick up the game and play without having to learn how to control pitch and yaw and how to do a complex roll during a corkscrewing backflip. There is Expert, where the player can control the pitch and yaw of the plane and even do rolls. Then there is Ace, in which the player can use the airbrake feature and the throttle sticks in place after they let go of the increase/decrease speed buttons.

== Differences ==
There are several differences between Airforce Delta Storm and its predecessor Airforce Delta:

- Airforce Delta Storm does not allow the player to choose a difficulty level.
- The player can choose the color of (but cannot edit) the HUD.
- Airforce Delta Storm does not allow the player to check his stats.

== Reception ==
Reception

Aggregate score
Aggregator	Score	
Aggregator	GBA	Xbox
Metacritic	71/100	61/100

Review scores
Publication	Score	
Publication	GBA	Xbox
Electronic Gaming Monthly	N/A	5.5/10
Famitsu	29/40	29/40
Game Informer	6.75/10	6.5/10
GamePro	N/A	3/5
GameRevolution	N/A	D+
GameSpot	N/A	6.8/10
GameSpy	4/5	66%
GameZone	N/A	7/10
IGN	7.1/10	6.2/10
Next Generation	N/A	2/5
Official Xbox Magazine (US)	N/A	7.1/10

The game received "mixed or average reviews" on both platforms according to the review aggregation website Metacritic. NextGen said of the Xbox version, "It's not bad, but there's really not anything new to see here." In Japan, Famitsu gave the Game Boy Advance and Xbox versions each a score of 29 out of 40.
