= Enemy Engaged: Apache vs Havoc =

1998 video game

- Developer: Razorworks
- Publisher: Empire Interactive
- Platform: Windows
- Release: October 18, 1998
- Genre: Combat flight simulator
- Mode: Single-player

Enemy Engaged: Apache vs Havoc (EEAH) is a helicopter flight simulator game developed by British developer Razorworks for Microsoft Windows and published by Empire Interactive on October 18, 1998.

== Gameplay ==
The game features two fully simulated combat helicopters: the US AH-64D Apache Longbow and Russian Mil-28N Havoc B.

== Legacy ==
It was followed by Enemy Engaged: Comanche vs Hokum, which was interconnectable with Apache vs Havoc. It also has a sequel called Enemy Engaged 2.

It has been released on GOG.com on March 12, 2009 and Steam on February 24, 2025.

== Reception ==
Reception

Review scores
| Publication | Score |
|---|---|
| Computer Gaming World | 4/5 |
| PC Gamer (UK) | 91% |
| PC Zone | 94/100 |
| Computer Games Strategy Plus | 3.5/5 |

Apache/Havoc was a runner-up for Computer Gaming World's 1999 "Simulation of the Year" award, which ultimately went to MiG Alley.
