= Enemy Engaged: RAH-66 Comanche vs. KA-52 Hokum =

2000 video game

- Developers: Razorworks; Zonic Limited (Mac OS X)
- Publishers: Empire Interactive; Feral Interactive (Mac OS X)
- Platforms: Windows, Macintosh
- Release: Windows: EU: April 2000; NA: July 2000; Macintosh; November 2002
- Genre: Combat flight simulator
- Modes: single-player, multiplayer

Enemy Engaged: Comanche vs Hokum, also known as simply Enemy Engaged or abbreviated EECH, is an attack helicopter combat flight simulator video game developed by Razorworks and released by Empire Interactive for Windows and macOS in 2000.

== Development and release ==
The game was a follow-up to Enemy Engaged: Apache vs Havoc, and interconnectable with it. A Mac OS X version of the game was developed by Zonic Limited and published by Feral Interactive in November 2002.

The source code was released around 2003 under an owned license. This resulted then in a heavily modified game by the game's community who continued the support. In 2009 the game was re-released as digital distribution on GOG.com.

A sequel, Enemy Engaged 2, was released in 2007.

The latest community update was released in April 2020.

== Reception ==
Reception

Aggregate score
Aggregator	Score
Metacritic	86/100

Review scores
Publication	Score
AllGame	4.5/5
CNET Gamecenter	7/10
Computer Gaming World	5/5
GameSpot	9/10
GameSpy	92%
GameZone	9/10
IGN	9/10
Macworld	(Mac) 3.5/5
Next Generation	4/5
PC Gamer (US)	90%

The PC version received "favorable" reviews according to the review aggregation website Metacritic. Doug Trueman of NextGen said of the game, "For those who love hyper-realistic simulations, they don't get much more hyper-realistic than this."

The staff of Computer Gaming World named it the best simulation game of 2000. They highlighted its "superb flight physics, intelligent AI, and outstanding eye and ear candy", and concluded, "In a beleaguered genre, it's good to see a developer invest the time and energy to produce a standout." The game also won the award for "Simulation of the Year" at GameSpot's Best and Worst of 2000 Awards. The staff of Computer Games Magazine also nominated the game for their 2000 "Simulation of the Year" award, whose winner was unfortunately never revealed due to data being lost from March 6, 2001. The game was a runner-up for "Simulation of 2000" in Editors' Choice at IGN's Best of 2000 Awards. It was a runner-up for GameSpy's 2000 Simulation Game of the Year, which went to MechWarrior 4: Vengeance. The staff wrote: "While the stunning graphics, true to life weather effects, and endless replay value blew us away in the end, it was the engrossing experience of being but a cog inside the war machine that stuck most in our minds." During the 4th Annual Interactive Achievement Awards, it received a nomination for the "PC Simulation" award by the Academy of Interactive Arts & Sciences, which was ultimately given to MechWarrior 4: Vengeance.
