= Aces High (video game) =

Open-ended combat flight simulator

- Previous logo for Aces High II. Current version lacks the II, reflecting the renaming of the game to Aces High.
- Developer: HiTech Creations
- Platform: Microsoft Windows
- Release: May 8, 2000
- Genre: Air combat simulation
- Modes: Single-player, multiplayer

Aces High (formerly known as Aces High II) is a combat flight simulation and massively multiplayer online game for Microsoft Windows. It was created by HiTech Creations and originally released on May 8, 2000; the game is subscriber based. It features aircraft from both the World War II and World War I eras, as well as smaller numbers of ground vehicles and ships. In 2016, HiTech Creations re-released the game with improved graphics and sounds.

While the main focus of Aces High is on World War II aerial combat, there is also a smaller selection of ground vehicles, ships, and World War I aircraft. There are over 100 aircraft, vehicles, and boats individually modeled in the game.

== Gameplay ==
Aces High is an open-ended combat flight simulator, where players can fly online or offline, and engage other players in air, land, or sea-based combat. Strategy is similar to capture the flag; there are three countries at war and the object is to win the war by capturing a percentage of the other two countries fields while retaining a percentage of your own fields. Capturing and defending fields takes cooperation of players of each side. Player built maps are rotated at the end of each war, reset, and started over. War lasts anywhere from hours to days depending on the arena and populations present.

=== World War II ===
The main (and original) focus of Aces High is World War II aerial combat. This takes place in several online arenas, the focuses of which include 'early', 'middle', and 'late' war aircraft. In addition to this, the World War II arenas also contain ground and naval combat, both of which operate alongside the air war. Although the selection of ground vehicles was a little lacking, it was later improved with the addition of the M4A3 and the M4A3(76) (a version armed with a 76mm high velocity gun as opposed to a 75mm low velocity gun, which would give better anti-tank capabilities at the cost of less powerful high-explosive shells).

=== World War I ===
HiTech Creations added aircraft from World War I in 2010, containing four aircraft: the Fokker Dr.I, Sopwith Camel, Bristol F.2B, and Fokker D.VII.

The World War 1 arena is set up as a dogfighting arena with 3 countries set up and bases in close proximity.

=== Scenarios ===
Scenarios are special large-scale battles in Aces High that run a 2-3 times per year. Usually, they are based on actual World War II battles, such as the Battle of Britain. Sometimes they are based on hypothetical battles that might have been. A scenario typically involves about 150 people divided into two sides, each with a dedicated command staff. Each side has particular aircraft, mission objectives, squadron assignments, bases, and resources. A scenario typically runs over the course of a month, with one battle per week, each battle lasting 3–4 hours.
