= B-17 Flying Fortress: The Mighty 8th =

2000 video game

- Developer: Wayward Design
- Publisher: Hasbro Interactive
- Platform: Microsoft Windows
- Release: NA: December 15, 2000; EU: December 2000
- Genre: Combat flight simulator
- Mode: Single-player

B-17 Flying Fortress: The Mighty 8th is a combat flight simulator developed by Wayward Design and published by Hasbro Interactive under the MicroProse brand in 2000 as a sequel to the 1992 flight simulator B-17 Flying Fortress World War II Bombers in Action. Tommo purchased the rights to this game and digitally publishes it through its Retroism brand in 2015.

== Reception ==
Reception

Aggregate score
Aggregator	Score
Metacritic	82/100

Review scores
Publication	Score
CNET Gamecenter	8/10
Computer Games Strategy Plus	4/5
Computer Gaming World	2/5
EP Daily	8/10
Eurogamer	7/10
GameSpot	7.8/10
GameSpy	90%
IGN	8/10
Next Generation	1/5
PC Gamer (US)	82%

The game received "favorable" reviews according to the review aggregation website Metacritic. In contrast, Samuel Bass of NextGen gave it a negative review, saying that the game was filled with several bugs, crashes and other technical issues, and felt that those issues made the game "unfinished". The only positive remarks that he gave are its "gorgeous" graphics and "impressive" physics, and noted the combined elements of roleplaying, strategy, and straight-up aerial combat.
