= Combat Air Patrol (video game) =

1993 combat flight simulator video game

- Cover art for the game.
- Developer: Psygnosis
- Publisher: Psygnosis
- Platforms: Amiga; MS-DOS
- Release: Amiga; 1993; MS-DOS; 1995
- Genre: Flight simulator

Combat Air Patrol is a flight simulator video game developed and published by Psygnosis in 1993 for the Amiga and MS-DOS.

== Gameplay ==
Set during the first Gulf War, the player is based aboard the USS Theodore Roosevelt (CVN-71), from which they fly sorties with the aim of defeating the Iraqi armed forces and liberating Kuwait. Players have the choice of two aircraft: the Grumman F-14 Tomcat and the McDonnell Douglas F/A-18 Hornet, with the former primarily focusing on escort missions and patrols and the latter on bombing runs such as destroying patrol boats, bridges and SCUD missile bases.

The player is able to play the entire mission from take-off, cruise, the mission itself, return cruise and landing, the latter presenting an especially high degree of challenge. In-flight refuelling is also a feature of the game during longer missions, and provides a similar challenge to the player's piloting skills.

Should a player not wish to fly a mission, they may report to the sick bay, but too many visits may cause the player to be declared unfit for duty. However, when a pilot is declared unfit (which is also caused by ejecting too many times), missing in action or if they are killed, a new pilot can be added to the roster and the game resumes from where the player's last previous left off.

As well as flying the aircraft, the player can command ground troops, plan mission routes and select the ordinance the aircraft should hold. There are also training missions and an option for instant action, which usually places the user in a dogfight.

The game is won when either Kuwait is liberated or Saddam Hussein is killed. Tip-offs to the latter's location are sometimes given and the player may opt to attempt a bombing run to kill him.

Whilst the Amiga version received generally positive reviews, the PC version was not met with such enthusiasm.

== Reception ==
Computer Gaming World in 1994 stated that Combat Air Patrol for the Amiga "has much to like despite its flaws. What is disappointing is that CAP could have been greatly improved quite easily ... a good first effort".
