= Air Combat 22 =

1995 video game

- North American arcade flyer
- Developer: Namco
- Publisher: Namco
- Platform: Arcade
- Release: JP: March 1995; NA: April 1995
- Genre: Air combat simulation
- Mode: Single player
- Arcade system: Namco System 22

Air Combat 22 (Note: Japanese: エアーコンバット 22, Hepburn: Eā Konbatto 22) is a 1995 combat fight simulator video game developed and published by Namco for arcades. It is the sequel to Namco's 1993 arcade game Air Combat. Its name comes from it running on Namco's Super System 22 hardware. It was released as both a dedicated deluxe arcade cabinet, and as an arcade conversion kit for Air Combat.

Hamster Corporation released the game as part of their Arcade Archives series for the Nintendo Switch and PlayStation 4, as well as their Arcade Archives 2 series for the Nintendo Switch 2, PlayStation 5 and Xbox Series X/S on July 3, 2025.

== Gameplay ==
Gameplay screenshot of Air Combat 22

Gameplay is similar to the original Air Combat game, with the addition of being able to control one of three aircraft, namely the Grumman F-14 Tomcat, Sukhoi Su-35 and the Lockheed YF-22. It was available as either an arcade conversion kit for the original Namco System 21 Air Combat cabinet, or a dedicated deluxe arcade cabinet (measuring 78" high, 43" wide and 111" deep).

== Reception ==
Next Generation reviewed the arcade version of the game, rating it three stars out of five, and stated that "as it is, Air Combat 22 is just a good facelift". Game Players called the arcade game "a screaming good time and worth every quarter", praising the game's "huge screen" and "authentic cockpit". Edge stated that the game "has few actual gameplay improvements" over Air Combat, but "boasts updated ground detail and enhanced aircraft", calling its surface detail "gorgeous". The publication also stated that the game was given "more of a close-combat feel", calling the result "a more exciting match-up".
