= Fighter Duel: Corsair vs. Zero =

1991 video game

- Developer: Jaeger Software
- Publisher: Jaeger Software
- Platform: Amiga
- Release: 1991
- Genre: Simulation

Fighter Duel: Corsair vs. Zero is a 1991 video game published by Jaeger Software.

== Gameplay ==
Fighter Duel: Corsair vs. Zero is a game in which the player pilots a Corsair fighter aircraft. This game focuses on accurate modelling of aerodynamics, and players can pan the view and look in any direction. The display for the game is hi-res and includes palette controls to customize the colors.

== Reception ==
Leah Wesolowski reviewed the game for Computer Gaming World, and stated that "While it is quite difficult to write a review based on less than five minutes of flight time, it is not difficult to say that this flight simulator is nearly impossible to fly."

Rob Hays for Amiga World noted that the game "can be a handful to fly" but also noted that the game rewards players by giving them "a real feeling of accomplishment" and helps players feel what it was like to fly in one of these fighters.

The reviewer for Info called it "the fastest flight simulator I've ever seen" and stated that it "feels like flying a jet".

== Reviews ==
- Amiga Joker
