= World War II Online =

2001 video game

WWII Online
- Original cover art
- Developer: Cornered Rat Software
- Publisher: Strategy First
- Director: Matt Callahan
- Producers: Rodney Hodge; Neil Huntley; Dana Baldwin; Steve Daniels; Geof Evans
- Designers: Mark Pribe; John MacQueen; Jonathon Hoof; Chris Sherland; Phil O'Connor
- Programmers: Caleb Luehrs; Ian Frisbie; Gwynne Raskind; Mathew Hogan; Mike Cox; Mike Carter
- Artists: Roger Long; Kevin Rivas; Bruce Patnaude; James Chilton; Rafael Harris; Jeremy Lindstrom; Hector Gonzalez
- Engine: Unity 3D (proprietary)
- Platforms: Windows, Mac OS X
- Release: Windows; June 6, 2001; Mac OS X November 13, 2002
- Genre: Massively multiplayer online first-person shooter
- Mode: Multiplayer

World War II Online: Blitzkrieg is a World War II massively multiplayer online first-person shooter (MMOFPS) developed by Playnet, Inc.'s internal game studio, "Cornered Rat Software", and it was originally released on June 6, 2001 for Microsoft Windows, with a Mac OS version being released in 2002. In 2005, WWII Online was re-released under the new name of WWII Online: Battleground Europe.

In the summer of 2017, WWII Online was released on Steam Early Access where it once again returned its name back to the original "WWII Online".

As of June 2021 the developers were working to port WWII Online from its proprietary engine to the Unreal Engine 5 in an effort to modernize graphics and workflows.

== Gameplay ==
WWII Online is set in 1940–1944 World War II in Western Europe. It is a virtual battlefield and a combined arms war simulation. A player can command or crew a variety of accurately modeled aircraft; armored fighting vehicles, anti-tank guns, anti-aircraft artillery, four naval vessels, fight as a foot-soldier with a variety of infantry weapons, or play as a paratrooper and drop from either a C-47 or Ju 52 transport aircraft. All vehicles with two or more positions may be multi-crewed by two players.

The game is played in real time alongside or against other players as either German, American, British or French forces in a persistent world. Command structures and missions provide strategic and tactical layers while ranks provide a RPG layer by demonstrating leadership roles. It uses a single, non-instanced, ½ scale map of western Europe with approximately 56,600 km^{2} (21,853 sq mi) of accurate terrain in which capturable cities, airfields and ports have been placed.

=== Players and units ===
WWII Online is team-oriented. Players play as various troops, pilots, gunners, tank commanders, naval destroyer captains, mission leaders, and high commanders, and are organized into brigades. Everyone plays in the brigade of their choice. Smaller military units of heavily themed squads are independently managed by players and can use their own tactics, but follow the brigade and strategic rules set by the high command players and cooperate with other squads and non-squad players. Being a squad member is optional but encouraged. Some squads have vigorous membership rites. Anyone that has a paid account can, however, form their own squad, solicit members and register the squad with the high command for brigade assignment.

Each player holds a title of rank, based on the military ranks of the time. Ranks are gained through a performance-based scoring system. Rank is never lost as a result of an unsuccessful mission or death.

Detailed statistics are tracked by the server, and made available through a web interface, known as 'Combat Statistics and Records', or CSR. Statistics are very detailed, recording a history of every mission the player has attempted over the campaign. Summary statistics are available to compare player performance to those of other players. Statistics include elements such as number of kills, damages, deaths, time spent on each mission, and depot captures. The top 100 players for several categories are updated regularly.

Communication between players via text is supported by a variety of communication channels for messages exchanged between players. Default channels are Target (players will communicate with others whose missions target a town and its linked facilities), Mission (all players who chose a mission created by the same person), squad (a voluntary group similar to a clan in other online games), Brigade (not commonly used), Operations (for Tactical/Strategic information and discussions) and Side (for more general and sometimes off-topic chat). There is also a Help channel which is tuned by default for new players. Numbered text channels can also be manually connected to. Each side's Air Force and Navy have designated numbered channels. Some squads who often play together use specific channels for inter-squad communication, and a particular coordinated effort between many the side's High Command, players, various squads and/or various military branches may decide to use a specific numbered channel, as their Target channels may be quite different. Additionally, it is common for players to communicate via the WWII Online Discord since cooperation with other players can be critical for success.

=== Playable equipment and damage model ===
A graphical representation of the damage model in WWII Online demonstrating the path of the shot (dark brown), the spall generated by the impact (yellow), and high explosive bursting charge (red) in colored lines. Ricochets are not indicated. The lines and vehicle shading are not visible during online play.

With its radiator steaming, and with both tracks blown off, a Stug III has effectively been disarmed by an onlooking M3A3 Stuart.

WWII Online has a variety of playable equipment, each modeled with data from historical references. In total, there are currently 250 different playable weapons. Like in many other RPGs, more equipment becomes available as the player gains more experience. New recruits start with a limited equipment selection. As the player progresses in rank, better vehicles and more infantry classes become available.

The damage model in WWII Online is realism based, as explained in this developer demonstration video. Within the limits of modern technology, it simulates real world kinetic damage to the game world. Vehicles are modeled with their essential critical components, such as engine, fuel tanks, etc. The components interact as if they were the real machine. For example, a punctured fuel tank will cause loss of fuel which will eventually cause the engine to run out of fuel causing the engine to stop. Leaking fuel within the vehicle can be set on fire by subsequent or existing damage to other parts of the vehicle, resulting in the tank "brewing up" and possibly exploding. Damaged components also provide feedback into the simulation model. For example, for aircraft, damage to flight surfaces will result in increased drag and reduced performance of the vehicle. Vehicles are modeled, within reasonable technical limits, to historically accurate detail.

The ballistic model is also detailed, taking into account drag coefficient properties, muzzle velocity, and mass of each individual type of ammunition. The game engine considers the physical details of all rounds in flight and at point of impact, calculating the angle of impact and energy of the round, and the thickness and slope of the target vehicle's armor. Rounds which manage to penetrate may go on to cause damage to components or crew members in the path of penetration. High energy rounds that do not fully penetrate may still cause spall (high velocity metal fragments) within the vehicle, if close enough to penetration. Rounds that penetrate a vehicle will usually leave a visible hole on the outside, while rounds that don't penetrate may leave a scuff mark where the round bounced off. Small arms fire will also often leave bullet holes or scuff marks on buildings or vehicles.

=== Strategic layer (High Command) ===
The position of the front lines on the map is updated every 15 minutes on WWII Online website.

Both sides in WWII Online have player-run groups, known as the High Command (HC), responsible for strategic management of the side's forces. High Command players have their own avatar. When HC players broadcast on the Ops channel a small "HC" symbol is displayed rather than the British/French/German side's symbol. An in-game list of all currently logged in HC players is available.

HC players have abilities that are not available to the rest of the playerbase, namely in the placing of Attack Objectives (AOs). When an AO is placed on a town, the other side gets an automatic Defence Objective (DO) on that town allowing all players to know that it is under attack. 10 minutes after an AO is first placed on a town, the town's Depot Office building, City Office building, and Rail Road Office buildings all become capturable. These capturable buildings are collectively known as Capture Points (CPs). Entering the Flag building linked to an Office building (marked with a large flag) will show an attacker how long it will take for the building to become capturable.

To capture a building, attackers must remain inside the Flag Building until the capture bar has hit 100%. If more than one player (up to eight) are inside the flag building, the bar will move faster. Additional attackers past the eighth have no effect on the capture speed. Defenders must kill all attackers in the flag building to start liberating the facility. Any attackers who enter the building (even if it is currently being liberated) start the capture bar moving up again. Capturing a flag gives the attacking side control of the corresponding building linked to the Office. If the Office links to a Depot that has a link to a friendly town, the Depot is referred to as "Spawnable" and players may spawn from new missions there, making them an important objective. Players may also despawn near a friendly depot and respawn inside it, called "Warping". This allows attackers to set up a Mobile Spawn Point near a non-spawnable depot and warp directly into it, avoiding any heavy defenses around the spawnable depots.

Ten minutes after an Office is captured, the town's Army Bunkers, Airfield Bunkers, Docks and Factories become capturable. The attacking side must continuously hold one flag in the town for this to happen. It does not have to be the same flag, they may capture two, lose one, capture another, lose the first, in any combination as long as they continue to hold at least one flag for ten minutes. Once all the town's Office buildings, Army Bunkers, Airfield Bunkers, Docks and Factories are captured, the AO and DO are lifted and the town changes ownership to the attacking side. All towns have an Army Base, some on rivers have Docks, some with large historical airfields have Airfields with a command bunker, and some important industrial towns have Factories.

AOs can also be placed on bridges. An AO on a bridge enables that side to destroy it, while a DO allows it to be repaired. Bombers and Naval Destroyers are usually tasked with blowing up bridges, while sapper (engineer) units must repair them. Bridges repair slowly if left alone.

High Command players are able to move their side's "brigades" along road links between friendly towns. Each brigade can be moved once every Hour if in a frontline town, or every half an hour if in a non-frontline town. A friendly brigade in a town allows players to spawn in that town to either defend or attack. Naval and Air Force brigades are considered "Self-Deployable" and can move directly from any town to another with the right Docks or Air Field facilities, as long as the destination town is held by friend forces and is not cut off from the main friendly-held area.

Each army division has a headquarters (HQ) unit and three combat brigades. Two of the brigades are Infantry brigades (with a high proportion of infantry and artillery, with only light tanks) and one brigade is classified as Armoured (with a high proportion of heavy and medium tanks and fewer infantry and artillery). The HQ unit is mostly used to resupply the other three brigades, and is vulnerable when placed on the front line by itself. It is common practice to attach the armoured brigade to one of the infantry brigades and use the HQ unit to resupply both.

The game's movement rules only allow the brigades to be moved to a friendly town that is no more than 1 town away from another brigade or the HQ in its own Division. The rule though does not apply in the case that the brigade is the only one left in its division and if this occurs it is free to move to any surrounding town. This occurs through the routing of brigades. Routing removes brigades from the game map for 6 hours and can happen in a few ways. Brigades in a division will normally "fallback" if the AB is captured, but only if the game's movement rules allow it, that is, move to within 1 link of a brigade or HQ in its own division. If none of the surrounding friendly towns are within 1 link of a brigade within its own division when the AB is captured, then the brigade will be routed off the game map for 6 hours.

High Command players that are Commanding Officers (CO) of a Brigade or higher can give out side-wide messages known as dot Axis or dot Allied messages. They are named thus as the command to type one out is, ".axis" or ".allied". These messages are seen by all players on a side and are used for a number of purposes. The usual purpose of the message is to inform players of important battles. The message will tell players what town is being attacked or defended, what brigade or brigades are involved, who the Officer in Command (OIC) of the attack or defence is and what chat and possibly Team Speak channels are being used. Most high command players liven their messages up beyond just the generic and quite humorous messages can often be seen. These messages can also be used to boost the "morale" of the troops by telling them how well they have been fighting and to announce future Operations that are being planned.

== History ==
=== Initial release ===
The game is commonly recognized as the first MMOFPS. Following the purchase of Interactive Creations of Grapevine's WarBirds by IEntertainment Network in 1999, several of the developers departed the company and formed new gaming companies. Some went to form Hitech Creations, while others went with John "Killer" MacQueen, Jonathon "Hoof" Hoof, Chris "Mo" Sherland to leverage their experience on WarBirds and Raider Wars to develop an online gaming network (G2 Network) with a massively-multiplayer first-person WWII simulation for both PC and Mac as the showpiece. After a lengthy closed beta stage, WWII Online went live on June 6, 2001 under the campaign title Blitzkrieg. The release was timed to coincide with the anniversary of the D-Day.

Like most online games, WWII Online is a continual work in progress, and so has a history of updates that are frequently released to add new features, fix problems and improve existing features. Updates, or patches to the game code, were released every 6 weeks, on average, but recently have moved to a less frequent but larger content format of 3 or 4 times a year. These patches generally include a wide range of features and problem fixes. Everything from new weapons and vehicles to audits of the performances of existing weapons and vehicles are part of the patching process as well as terrain, structure, game play and performance improvements.

The initial launch had a number of technical difficulties. The game required that players download a 70 MB update before they could play online. At the time, the majority of users had 56k modems, requiring around three hours to update the game. As the developers worked feverishly behind the scenes to complete other promised features and fix the software bugs on the gold CD, even more updates became necessary. Three days prior to release, the colocation network facility had a bad fiber optic cable. This failure reduced the player capacity of the server cluster, from 10,000 players down to only 1200 players. As a temporary workaround, Playnet set up multiple copies of the game-world on different servers, distributing the network load, but at some cost in game play. This solution lasted for several months while the developers resolved the server-side issues, after which all servers were merged into a single game-world. Some features advertised on the game box were partially implemented, or missing, such as rank and high-command strategic features.

The combination of the above problems resulted in game returns, complaints from customers, and a drop-off in sales as word spread of the game's state. Subscription fees for the first several months were waived, until the major problems with the game were resolved. This helped to retain many of the players, especially the long-term fans of the project, but it was not long before Playnet had financial problems. They filed for Chapter 11 bankruptcy protection in late 2001, and cut costs, resulting in a number of lay-offs within the company. Statements from both the developer (CRS), and publisher (Strategy First), indicated that CRS wanted a longer open beta, but the game was launched anyway, due to financial reasons.

=== Re-release ===
Retail packaging, from Battleground Europe release in 2006

WWII Online completed a third retail release in 2005 under the new campaign title Battleground Europe. This new title was chosen because of legal considerations with the old title of Blitzkrieg, whose trademark was owned by another game. The Battleground Europe re-release was distributed across Europe in late 2005 and in the United States in early 2006 by the game's new publishers GMX Media (Europe) and Matrix Games (USA). WWII Online: Battleground Europe was largely a compilation of fixes already available through patches to the original game, but compared to the initial 2001 release, the game was drastically different due to these changes.

In summer 2017, WWII Online was released on Steam Early Access.

== Guinness World Records ==
- First MMO first-person shooter (FPS) videogame
- First massively multiplayer online war game
- Largest playable area in a shooter videogame

== Reception ==
Reception

Aggregate score
Aggregator	Score
Metacritic	57/100

Review scores
Publication	Score
Computer Games Magazine	1/5
Computer Gaming World	2/5
Eurogamer	(B.E.) 7/10
Game Informer	8.25/10
GameSpot	5.8/10
GameSpy	55%
GameZone	7/10
IGN	5.9/10
MacLife	(Mac) 3/5
Next Generation	2/5
PC Gamer (US)	50%

The PC version received "mixed" reviews according to the review aggregation website Metacritic. Kevin Rice of NextGen said of the game, "A huge learning curve coupled with low gratification and zero organization make[s] this a title only for those with the patience of a saint."
