= Apache (video game) =

1995 video game

- Developer: Digital Integration
- Publisher: Digital Integration
- Platforms: DOS, Windows, Macintosh
- Release: September 22, 1995
- Genre: Combat flight simulation
- Modes: Single-player, multiplayer

Apache is a video game released by Digital Integration in 1995 for DOS and Macintosh. The game is a combat flight simulation of the American AH-64D Apache Longbow helicopter. A successor, Hind, was released in 1996.

== Gameplay ==
In campaign mode, the player can choose which 3 areas to enter in a tour of duty. The campaign mode also plays video clips and has a briefing before any mission. The player is given a choice of ordnance, and is able to zoom in on the mission map, giving them a satellite view of the area or target and meteorological data.

== Reception ==
Reception

Review scores
Publication	Score
Computer Gaming World	4/5
Next Generation	5/5
PC Gamer (UK)	90%
PC Gamer (US)	95%
PC Games	A

Award
Publication	Award
PC Gamer US	Best Simulation

Apache was a commercial success, with global sales above 200,000 units by February 1996. More than 120,000 of these sales derived from the United States.

A reviewer for Next Generation called the game "a stunningly realistic simulation of one of the most complex military aircrafts [sic] of all time". He complimented the effectiveness of the polygon graphics, the selection of modes for network and modem play, the extreme realism of the flight simulation, and the balance and ingenuity of the scenario designs. He gave it five out of five stars.

Apache was named the best simulation of 1995 by PC Gamer US and—tying with Flight Unlimited—Computer Games Strategy Plus. PC Gamer US's editors wrote, "With all of its difficulty and realism options cranked up to maximum, Apache can be played as a hard-core simulation of the world's best attack helicopter, [... and] novice air-combat pilots — or those who simply enjoy a good shoot-'em-up — can reduce the difficulty level until Apache plays like a fast-paced, no-holds-barred arcade-action game."

Apache was a finalist in the Best Simulation Software Program category in the 1996 CODiE Awards.
