= European Air War =

1998 video game

- Developer: MicroProse
- Publisher: MicroProse
- Producer: Martin DeRiso
- Designer: Tsuyoshi Kawahito
- Programmer: Tsuyoshi Kawahito
- Composer: Roland J. Rizzo
- Platform: Windows
- Release: EU: 1998; NA: November 3, 1998
- Genre: Air combat simulation
- Modes: Single-player, multiplayer

European Air War is a combat flight simulator developed and published by MicroProse and published for Microsoft Windows in 1998. It is a sequel to 1942: The Pacific Air War. It simulates the Battle of Britain, and the Allied Air offensives in Western Europe during World War II in 1943–1945.

== Gameplay ==
European Air War has three modes: a Quick Start option, which allows immediate undefined play; a Single Mission option, which allows selection of aircraft and mission type, and a campaign mode called Pilot Career.

The Pilot Career mode, allows the user to take the role of a pilot in the RAF, Luftwaffe or USAAF and play in any of three time eras, the Battle of Britain in 1940, the Allied Air offensives in 1943, and the Air offensives before and after D-Day until the end of the war in 1944–45. During a Pilot Career player actions will directly affect the progress of the war, including delaying or bringing forward the invasion of Europe. Players may also rise up the ranks, starting as a non-commissioned officer to full officer commanding a fighter squadron (or staffel) and assuming responsibility for the men and machines under the player's command. As a squadron commander a player can select the rosters and weapons loadouts for use in missions, selecting between disposable fuel tanks, rockets, or bombs to assist in completing assigned missions.

The AI in European Air War is flexible, with several difficulty settings that can be altered by the user to ensure the game remains challenging for a long period of time. AI pilots within the player's squadron can be controlled by the user in Quick Start and Single Mission options, and gradually become available as the player receives promotions within their squadron in a Pilot Career.

== Reception ==
Reception

Aggregate score
Aggregator	Score
GameRankings	86%

Review scores
Publication	Score
AllGame	3/5
CNET Gamecenter	9/10
Computer Games Strategy Plus	4/5
Computer Gaming World	4/5
GamePro	4.5/5
GameRevolution	B
GameSpot	8.7/10
IGN	8.2/10
PC Gamer (US)	89%
PC Zone	87%

The game received favorable reviews according to the review aggregation website GameRankings.

The game won Computer Games Strategy Plus' 1998 "Simulation Game of the Year" award. The staff wrote that the game brought the fine balance of campaigns, flight modeling, graphics, and gameplay. It similarly won Computer Gaming World's "Best Simulation" award, and the staff raved that it captured the feeling of being in a living, unpredictable combat environment better than any other WW2 flight sims. It also won "Best Simulation of the Year" at IGN's Best of 1998 Awards, "Simulation of the Year" at GameSpot's Best & Worst of 1998 Awards, and the Best Combat Flight Sim award at the 1998 CNET Gamecenter Awards.

The staff of PC Gamer US nominated the game as the best simulation of 1998, although it lost to Falcon 4.0. They wrote that the former was "easily the most engaging and authentic-feeling WWII sim" of that year.

== See also ==
- Jane's WWII Fighters
- Microsoft Combat Flight Simulator
