= List of PlayStation 4 free-to-play games =

Here are the list of the free-to-play games which released for the PlayStation 4 console.

Key
3D 3D television output	C PS Camera support	CB Supports cross-buy	CP Supports cross-play	M PS Move support	P Pro enhanced	PL PlayLink	VR Virtual Reality support

Title	Genre(s)	Developer(s)	Publisher(s)	Release date			Addons	Ref.	
Title	Genre(s)	Developer(s)	Publisher(s)	JP	NA	PAL	Addons	Ref.	
3on3 FreeStyle	Sports	JoyCity	JoyCity	Dec 9, 2016	Dec 6, 2016	Feb 22, 2017			
Adventure Capitalist	Incremental	Hyper Hippo Productions	Hyper Hippo Productions	Unreleased	Aug 15, 2016	Nov 15, 2016			
A King's Tale: Final Fantasy XV	Action	Empty Clip Studios	Square Enix	Mar 1, 2017	Mar 1, 2017	Mar 1, 2017			
APB: Reloaded	MMO	Reloaded Studios	K2 Network	Unreleased	Mar 31, 2017	Mar 31, 2017			
Apex Legends	Battle royale; first-person shooter	Respawn Entertainment	Electronic Arts	Feb 5, 2019	Feb 4, 2019	Feb 4, 2019	CP P		
Armored Warfare	Tactical shooter	IllFonic	My.com	Unreleased	Feb 20, 2018	Feb 20, 2018			
Asphalt Legends	Racing	Gameloft Barcelona	Gameloft	Jul 17, 2024	Jul 17, 2024	Jul 17, 2024	CP		
Atom Universe	Virtual community; party	Atom Republic	Atom Republic	Unreleased	Sep 23, 2016	Sep 28, 2016	CP VR		
Battle Ages	Real-time strategy	DR Studios	505 Games	Unreleased	Apr 20, 2016	Apr 20, 2016			
Battle Islands	Real-time strategy	DR Studios	505 Games	Oct 29, 2014	Oct 29, 2014	Oct 29			
Battle Islands: Commanders	Real-time strategy	DR Studios	505 Games	Unreleased	Feb 13, 2017	Feb 13, 2017			
Blacklight: Retribution	First-person shooter	Zombie Studios	Zombie Studios	Unreleased	Nov 15, 2013	Nov 29, 2013			
Bleach: Brave Souls	Action	KLabGames	KLabGames	Feb 14, 2022	Feb 14, 2022	Feb 14, 2022			
Bless Unleashed	Massively multiplayer online role-playing	Round 8 Studios	Bandai Namco; Neowiz	Unreleased	Oct 22, 2020	Oct 22, 2020	P		
Border Break	Third-person shooter, mecha	Sega	Sega	Aug 2, 2018	Unreleased	Unreleased			
Brawlhalla	Fighting, platform	Blue Mammoth Games	Blue Mammoth Games	Oct 17, 2017	Oct 17, 2017	Oct 17, 2017	CP P		
Call of Duty: Warzone	Battle royale; first-person shooter	Infinity Ward	Activision	Mar 10, 2020	Mar 10, 2020	Mar 10, 2020	CP		
Caravan Stories	Massively multiplayer online role-playing	Aiming	Aiming	Apr 11, 2019	Sep 10, 2019	Unreleased	3D		
Century: Age of Ashes	Action	Playwing	Playwing	2022	2022	2022			
Clicker Heroes	Incremental	Playsaurus	Playsaurus	Unreleased	Mar 7, 2017	Mar 7, 2017			
Closers	Action, side-scroller, massively multiplayer online role-playing	Naddic Games	Laplace	Jun 11, 2019	Unreleased	Unreleased			
Crossout	MMO; vehicular combat	Targem Games	Gaijin Entertainment	Oct 12, 2017	May 30, 2017	May 30, 2017			
CRSED: F.O.A.D.	Battle royale	Darkflow Studio	Gaijin Entertainment	Dec 2, 2020	Dec 3, 2020	Dec 3, 2020	P		
Cryptract	Role-playing	Bank of Innovation	Lionsfilm	Sep 8, 2016	Sep 24, 2018	Unreleased			
Dead or Alive 5 Last Round: Core Fighters	Fighting	Team Ninja	Koei Tecmo	Feb 17, 2015	Feb 19, 2015	Feb 20, 2015			
Dead or Alive 6: Core Fighters	Fighting	Team Ninja	Koei Tecmo	Mar 1, 2019	Mar 1, 2019	Mar 1, 2019			
Defiance 2050	Third-person shooter	Trion Worlds	Trion Worlds	Unreleased	Jul 10, 2018	Jul 10, 2018			
Destiny 2	First-person shooter	Bungie	Bungie	Oct 2, 2019	Oct 1, 2019	Oct 1, 2019	CP P		
Disney Speedstorm	Racing	Gameloft Barcelona	Gameloft	Sep 28, 2023	Sep 28, 2023	Sep 28, 2023	CP		
Dissidia Final Fantasy NT Free Edition	Action role-playing, fighting	Koei Tecmo	Square Enix	Nov 12, 2018	Mar 12, 2019	Mar 12, 2019			
DNF Duel	Fighting	Neople; Arc System Works; Eighting	Nexon	2022	2022	2022			
Dogfighter: World War 2	Battle royale	Grumpy; iBong	Iggymob	Jun 27, 2019	Mar 3, 2020	Unreleased			
Don't Bite Me Bro	Survival	Arcade Distillery	Arcade Distillery	Unreleased	Mar 21, 2018	Unreleased			
Don't Even Think	Battle royale	Dark Horse Studio	Perfect World Games	Sep 9, 2019	Jul 10, 2019	Apr 3, 2020			
Dragon Ball Xenoverse 2 Lite	Fighting, role-playing	Dimps	Bandai Namco	Unreleased	Mar 20, 2019	Mar 20, 2019			
Dragon's Dogma Online	Role-playing	Capcom	Capcom	Aug 31, 2015	Unreleased	Unreleased	CP		
Dream C Club: Host Girls on Stage	Life simulation	D3 Publisher	D3 Publisher	Feb 22, 2014	Unreleased	Unreleased			
Dreadnought	Space combat	Yager / Iron Galaxy	Six Foot	Unreleased	Aug 1, 2017	Aug 1, 2017	P		
Dungeon Defenders II	Tower defense	Trendy Entertainment	Reverb Triple XP	Jun 20, 2017	Jun 20, 2017	Jun 20, 2017			
Dynasty Warriors 8: Empires Free Alliances	Hack and slash	Omega Force	Tecmo Koei	Unreleased	Mar 17, 2014	Mar 11, 2014	CP		
Dynasty Warriors Online	MMO	Koei Tecmo	Koei Tecmo	Sep 18, 2014	Unreleased	Unreleased			
eFootball	Sports	Konami	Konami	Sep 30, 2021	Sep 30, 2021	Sep 30, 2021			
eFootball PES 2021 Lite	Sports	PES Productions	Konami	Dec 7, 2019	Dec 7, 2020	Dec 7, 2020	P		
Elemental Knights Online R	Massively multiplayer online role-playing	Winlight	Winlight	Feb 4, 2021	Feb 4, 2021	Feb 4, 2021			
Eternal	Massively multiplayer online role-playing	Asobimo	Asobimo	Jul 19, 2021	Unreleased	Unreleased			
Fallout Shelter	Simulation	Bethesda Game Studios	Bethesda Softworks	Jun 11, 2018	Jun 10, 2018	Jun 10, 2018			
Fantasy Strike	Fighting	Sirlin Games	Sirlin Games	Unreleased	Jul 25, 2019	Jul 25, 2019	CP		
Figureheads	Mech-combat	Square Enix	Square Enix	Mar 9, 2017	Unreleased	Unreleased			
Fishing Planet	Sports	Fishing Planet	Fishing Planet	Unreleased	Aug 29, 2017	Aug 29, 2017	P		
Fortnite	Battle royale; sandbox; survival	Epic Games	Epic Games	Mar 8, 2018	Jul 25, 2017	Jul 25, 2017	CP P		
Final Fantasy Crystal Chronicles Remastered Lite	Action role-playing	Square Enix	Square Enix	Aug 27, 2020	Aug 27, 2020	Aug 27, 2020	CP		
The Four Kings Casino and Slots	Card & board	Digital Leisure	Digital Leisure	Unreleased	Dec 8, 2015	Feb 23, 2016			
Frozen Free Fall: Snowball Fight	Puzzle	Disney Interactive	Disney Interactive	Unreleased	Sep 15, 2015	Sep 15, 2015			
Games of Glory	Action	Lightbulb Club	Lightbulb Club	Unreleased	Apr 25, 2017	Apr 25, 2017	CP		
Gems of War	Puzzle	Pipeworks Studios	505 Games	Unreleased	Nov 13, 2015	Nov 13, 2015			
Genesis	Multiplayer online battle arena	Rampage Games	HL Network Technology	Aug 15, 2019	Aug 13, 2019	Aug 14, 2019	CP		CP
Growtopia	Adventure; sandbox	Ubisoft	Ubisoft	Unreleased	Jul 18, 2019	Jul 18, 2019			
Guns Up!	Action; strategy	Valkyrie Entertainment	Sony Computer Entertainment	Unreleased	Dec 5, 2015	Dec 9, 2015			
Gwent: The Witcher Card Game	Card & board	CD Projekt Red	CD Projekt	Dec 4, 2018	Dec 4, 2018	Dec 4, 2018	CP		
H1Z1 Battle Royale	Battle royale	Daybreak Game Company	Daybreak Game Company	Apr 18, 2019	May 22, 2018	May 22, 2018	P		
Hand of the Gods: Smite Tactics	Turn-based strategy	Hi-Rez Studios	Hi-Rez Studios	Unreleased	Feb 20, 2018	Feb 20, 2018			
Happy Dungeons	Tactical role-playing	Toylogic	Toylogic	Sep 7, 2017	Sep 12, 2017	Sep 12, 2017			
Hawken	First-person shooter	Reloaded Games	505 Games	Jul 8, 2016	Jul 8, 2016	Jul 8, 2016			
Hex: Card Clash	Card & board	Hex Entertainment	Hex Entertainment	Feb 27, 2018	Sep 17, 2017	Jan 31, 2018	CP		
Hunter's Arena: Legends	Massively multiplayer online role-playing	Mantisco	Mantisco	TBA	TBA	TBA			
Hustle Kings	Pool	VooFoo Studios	Sony Computer Entertainment	Unreleased	Mar 17, 2015	Feb 18, 2015	M VR		
Hyper Scape	Battle royale; first-person shooter	Ubisoft Montreal	Ubisoft	Aug 11, 2020	Aug 11, 2020	Aug 11, 2020			
Idle Champions of the Forgotten Realms	Casual	Codename Entertainment	Codename Entertainment	Unreleased	Dec 11, 2018	Unreleased			
Invokers Tournament	Multiplayer online battle arena	StormBasic Games	StormBasic Games	Unreleased	Jun 9, 2014	Dec 3, 2014	CP		
Is It Wrong to Try to Shoot 'em Up Girls in a Dungeon?	Action role-playing	5pb.	PQube	Unreleased	Nov 25, 2020	Nov 27, 2020			
Island Saver	Action-adventure	Stormcloud Games	National Westminster Bank	Unreleased	May 13, 2020	May 13, 2020			
Jikkyou Powerful Pro Baseball Success Special	Sports	Konami	Konami	Apr 27, 2016	Unreleased	Unreleased			
Kai-Ri-Sei Million Arthur	Card & board	Square Enix	Square Enix	Sep 1, 2016	Unreleased	Unreleased	CP		
KartRider: Drift	Kart racing	Nexon	Nexon	2022	2022	2022			
Kill Strain	Action, strategy	SCE San Diego	Sony Interactive Entertainment	Unreleased	Jul 19, 2016	Jul 19, 2016			
King of Wushu	Multiplayer online battle arena	Snail Games	Snail Games	Released exclusively in China (Feb 2016)					
Kitten Squad	Action	Nine Tales Digital	Nine Tales Digital	Unreleased	Sep 15, 2015	Jun 9, 2016			
Knights of Valour	Beat 'em up	International Games System	International Games System	Unreleased	Nov 28, 2017	Sep 15, 2015			
Knives Out	Battle royale	NetEase	NetEase	Dec 20, 2019	Unreleased	Unreleased			
Knives Out: Extreme	Third-person shooter	NetEase	NetEase	2022	TBA	TBA			
Let It Die	Hack and slash	Grasshopper Manufacture	GungHo Online Entertainment	Feb 2, 2017	Dec 3, 2016	Dec 3, 2016	P		
Love Live! School Idol Festival: After School Activity Wai-Wai! Home Meeting!!	Rhythm	Square Enix	Square Enix	Mar 24, 2021	Mar 24, 2021	Unreleased			
Minefield	Puzzle	Kodobur	Kodobur	Unreleased	Mar 21, 2018	Unreleased			
Mobile Suit Gundam: Battle Operation 2	Mech-combat	Bandai Namco	Bandai Namco	Jul 25, 2018	Oct 1, 2019	Oct 1, 2019			
Mobile Suit Gundam: Battle Operation Code Fairy Volume 1	Action	Bandai Namco	Bandai Namco	Nov 5, 2021	Nov 5, 2021	Nov 5, 2021			
Mobile Suit Gundam: Battle Operation Code Fairy Volume 2	Action	Bandai Namco	Bandai Namco	Nov 19, 2021	Nov 19, 2021	Nov 19, 2021			
Mobile Suit Gundam: Battle Operation Code Fairy Volume 3	Action	Bandai Namco	Bandai Namco	Dec 3, 2021	Dec 3, 2021	Dec 3, 2021			
My Hero Academia: Ultra Rumble	Battle royale	Bandai Namco	Bandai Namco	TBA	TBA	TBA			
Naughty Kitties	Tower defence	Coconuts Island Studio	Coconuts Island Studio	Released exclusively in China (Jan 2016)					
NBA 2K17: The Prelude	Sports	Visual Concepts	2K Sports	Sep 8, 2016	Sep 8, 2016	Sep 8, 2016			
NBA 2K18: The Prelude	Sports	Visual Concepts	2K Sports	Sep 8, 2017	Sep 8, 2017	Sep 8, 2017			
NBA 2K19: The Prelude	Sports	Visual Concepts	2K Sports	Aug 31, 2018	Aug 31, 2018	Aug 31, 2018			
NBA 2K20: The Prelude	Sports	Visual Concepts	2K Sports	Aug 31, 2019	Aug 31, 2019	Aug 31, 2019			
Nebula Realms	Virtual community; party	Xaloc Studios	Xaloc Studios	Unreleased	Oct 25, 2016	Oct 4, 2017			
Neverwinter	Massively multiplayer online role-playing	Cryptic Studios	Perfect World Entertainment	Jul 19, 2016	Jul 19, 2016	Jul 19, 2016			
Nobunaga's Ambition Online	Tactical role-playing	Tecmo Koei	Tecmo Koei	Mar 19, 2014	Unreleased	Unreleased			
Onigiri	Massively multiplayer online role-playing	CyberStep	CyberStep	Apr 16, 2014	Oct 6, 2015	Unreleased			
Operation7 Showdown	Third-person shooter	Park ESM	Park ESM	Unreleased	Oct 23, 2020	Unreleased			
Orcs Must Die! Unchained	Tower defense	Robot Entertainment	Robot Entertainment	Unreleased	Jul 18, 2017	Jul 18, 2017			
Paladins	First-person shooter	Hi-Rez Studios	Hi-Rez Studios	May 8, 2018	May 8, 2018	May 8, 2018	P		
Paraiso Island	Simulation	Arcade Distillery	Arcade Distillery	Unreleased	Mar 5, 2019	Unreleased			
Path of Exile	Action role-playing	Grinding Gear Games	Grinding Gear Games	Mar 26, 2019	Mar 26, 2019	Mar 26, 2019	P		
Phantasy Star Online 2	Massively multiplayer online role-playing	Sega	Sega	Apr 20, 2016	Unreleased	Unreleased	CP		
Phantasy Star Online 2: New Genesis	Massively multiplayer online role-playing	Sega	Sega	Jun 9, 2021	Unreleased	Unreleased			
The Pinball Arcade	Pinball	FarSight Studios	FarSight Studios	Feb 22, 2014	Dec 17, 2013	Dec 18, 2013			
Pinball FX 3	Pinball	Zen Studios	Zen Studios	Sep 26, 2017	Sep 26, 2017	Sep 26, 2017	CP		
Pirates: Treasure Hunters	Action role-playing; massively multiplayer online	Virtual Toys	Virtual Toys	Unreleased	Jun 21, 2016	Jun 21, 2016			
PlanetSide 2	MMOFPS	Daybreak	Daybreak	Jun 23, 2015	Jun 23, 2015	Jun 23, 2015	P		
The Playroom	Party	SCE Japan Studio	Sony Computer Entertainment	Feb 22, 2014	Nov 15, 2013	Nov 29, 2013	C		
Pox Nora	Card & board	Desert Owl Games	Desert Owl Games	May 23, 2017	May 23, 2017	May 23, 2017	CP		
Prominence Poker	Card & board	Pipeworks Studios	505 Games	Unreleased	Aug 23, 2016	Aug 24, 2016			
Qurare: Magic Library	Card & board	IO studio	Smilegate	Jan 28, 2016	Sep 6, 2016	Unreleased			
Realm Royale	Battle royale	Heroic Leap Games	Hi-Rez Studios	Jan 22, 2019	Jan 22, 2019	Jan 22, 2019			
Rec Room	Virtual world	Rec Room Inc.	Rec Room Inc.	Jun 14, 2020	Nov 21, 2017	Nov 21, 2017	CP M VR		
Refight: The Last Warship	Strategy	Fantian	Fantian	Unreleased	TBA	TBA			
Roblox	Crafting, game creator	Roblox Corporation	Roblox Corporation	Oct 10, 2023	Oct 10, 2023	Oct 10, 2023	CP P		
Rocket League	Sports	Psyonix	Psyonix	Sep 23, 2020	Sep 23, 2020	Sep 23, 2020	CP P		
Rogue Company	Third-person shooter	Hi-Rez Studios	Hi-Rez Studios	Oct 1, 2020	Sep 30, 2020	Jun 2, 2020	CP		
Roller Champions	Sports	Ubisoft Montreal	Ubisoft	Unreleased	TBA	TBA			
Scavengers	Shooter; survival	Midwinter Entertainment	Midwinter Entertainment	Unreleased	TBA	TBA			
SingStar	Karaoke, music	SCE London Studio	Sony Computer Entertainment	Unreleased	Oct 28, 2014	Oct 24, 2014	C		
Skyforge	MMO	Allods Team	Obsidian Entertainment	Dec 6, 2018	Apr 11, 2017	Apr 11, 2017	P		
Smite	Multiplayer online battle arena	Hi-Rez Studios	Hi-Rez Studios	Unreleased	Mar 22, 2016	May 31, 2016	CP P		
Spacelords	Action-adventure	MercurySteam	MercurySteam	Aug 23, 2018	Aug 23, 2018	Aug 23, 2018	CP P		
Spelunker World	Action	Square Enix	Square Enix	Mar 19, 2015	Nov 11, 2015	Unreleased			
Spellbreak	Battle royale	Proletariat	Proletariat	Sep 3, 2020	Sep 3, 2020	Sep 3, 2020	CP		
Starlit Adventures	Action, platform	Rockhead Studios	Rockhead Studios	Unreleased	May 17, 2018	Apr 10, 2018			
Star Trek Online	Massively multiplayer online role-playing	Cryptic Studios	Perfect World Entertainment	Unreleased	Sep 6, 2016	Sep 7, 2016			
Stern Pinball Arcade	Pinball	FarSight Studios	FarSight Studios	Unreleased	Nov 15, 2016	Unreleased			
Super Bomberman R Online	Action; battle royale	Konami	Konami	May 27, 2021	May 27, 2021	May 27, 2021			
Switchblade	Vehicular combat	Lucid Games	Lucid Games	Unreleased	Jan 22, 2019	Jan 22, 2019			
Tactical Legends	Turn-based tactics	Vera Gaming	Vera Gaming	Unreleased	TBA	TBA			
Tera	Massively multiplayer online role-playing	Bluehole	En Masse Entertainment	Nov 29, 2018	Apr 3, 2018	Apr 3, 2018			
Texas Holdem Poker: Pokerist	Card & board	KamaGames	KamaGames	Unreleased	Unreleased	Sep 17, 2019			
Toukiden 2 Free Alliances	Action RPG	Koei Tecmo	Koei Tecmo	Unreleased	May 30, 2017	May 31, 2017			
Trans-Galactic Tournament	Multiplayer online battle arena	Kiz Studios	Hibernum Creations	Unreleased	Aug 4, 2015	Feb 17, 2016			
Trove	MMO; sandbox	Trion Worlds	Trion Worlds	May 24, 2018	Mar 14, 2017	Dec 13, 2016			
Vigor	Loot shooter	Bohemia Interactive	Bohemia Interactive	Unreleased	Dec 9, 2020	Dec 9, 2020	P		
Warface	Tactical shooter	Crytek Kiev	My.com	Aug 14, 2018	Aug 14, 2018	Aug 14, 2018	P		
Warframe	Third-person shooter	Digital Extremes	Digital Extremes	Feb 22, 2014	Nov 15, 2013	Nov 29, 2013	CP		
War Thunder	MMO, flight simulator	Gaijin Entertainment	Gaijin Entertainment	Apr 27, 2017	Dec 16, 2014	Nov 29, 2013	CP P C		
Weapons of Mythology: New Age	Massively multiplayer online role-playing	Gamemag Interactive	Lionsfilm	Mar 25, 2016	Unreleased	Unreleased	CP		
World of Tanks	Vehicular combat	Wargaming	Wargaming	Jan 20, 2016	Jan 19, 2016	Jan 19, 2016	P		
World of Warships: Legends	Naval simulation; vehicular combat	Lesta Studio	Wargaming	Apr 16, 2019	Apr 16, 2019	Apr 16, 2019	CP P		
Zaccaria Pinball	Pinball	Magic Pixel Games	Magic Pixel Games	Unreleased	Aug 3, 2020	Unreleased			
Zen Pinball 2	Pinball	Zen Studios	Zen Studios	Unreleased	Dec 24, 2013	Dec 17, 2013	3D		

== See also ==
- List of PlayStation VR games
