= Active Matter (video game) =

- Developer: Matter Team
- Publisher: Gaijin Entertainment
- Composer: Akira Yamaoka
- Engine: Dagor Engine
- Platforms: Xbox Series X/S; PlayStation 5; Personal computer
- Release: September 15, 2026
- Genre: First-person shooter
- Mode: Multiplayer

Active Matter is a multiplayer first-person shooter developed by Matter Team and published by Gaijin Entertainment. The game combines realistic military simulation gunplay with a bizarre sci-fi world heavily influenced by the SCP Foundation universe and features music by Silent Hill's composer Akira Yamaoka. Active Matter is set to be released on September 15, 2026, for Microsoft Windows, PlayStation 5, and Xbox Series X/S.

== Gameplay ==
Active Matter is playable both solo and in squads with other players and incorporates PvPvE and PvE extraction-style raids, and a separate PvP mode. The arsenal includes over 60 firearms drawn from real-world military technology, as well as vehicles (trucks, buggies, armored cars, and tanks), reconnaissance drones and robo-dogs. The game maps are filled with anomalies that bend gravity and offer vertical gameplay opportunities. Enemies include both other human players and SCP-style monsters.

== Development ==
Gaijin Entertainment announced the game on October 2024, and premiered the core gameplay trailer on Future Game Show at Gamescom 2025. The early access version arrived in Gaijin Store in September 2025. Unlike most other games by Gaijin Entertainment, Active Matter is not a free-to-play title and is offered as a premium game.

Active Matter is using Gaijin's own Dagor Engine, the same technology that powers War Thunder and Enlisted.

== See also ==
- War Thunder
- Enlisted
- Escape from Tarkov
