= Enlisted =

Enlisted may refer to:

- Enlisted rank, any rank below that of a commissioned officer
- Enlisted (TV series), a 2014 television series
- Enlisted (video game), a 2021 massively multiplayer online game first-person shooter video game

== See also ==
- Military service, or enlistment
