= Cosmic Break =

2008–2012 video game with a sequel

CosmicBreak
- Developer: CyberStep
- Publisher: CyberStep
- Platform: Windows
- Release: JPN: 19 December 2008; TWN: 5 January 2010; NA: 23 December 2010; KOR: 11 January 2012
- Genre: Third-person shooter
- Mode: Multiplayer

Cosmic Break (Japanese: コズミックブレイク, Hepburn: Kozumikku Bureiku; also stylized as CosmicBreak) is a free to play 3D MMO third-person shooter with big robots and colorful, explosive battles in an anime style. The game was developed and published by the Japanese company CyberStep, Inc. and was officially released in several countries. As is the case with GetAmped2, Cosmic Break also has various NPCs and playable characters voiced by famous Japanese voice-over artists. Among these are Rie Tanaka (Icy, Ivis), Akio Ōtsuka (Draken), Takeshi Kusao (Lios), Asami Shimoda (Crimrose, Lily Rain), Atsuko Tanaka (Koko Gaap, Winberrl) and Daisuke Sakaguchi (Jikun Hu).

In 2015, a sequel game, with different mechanics and cast, Cosmic League (Cosmic Break 2) was announced for development and had a failed Kickstarter campaign was launched that raised less than half of its target. Regardless, CosmicBreak 2 was released in the Summer of 2015 with a new cast of humanoid robots and an original story and was planned to continue service alongside its initial counterpart. Both games have shut down service in the U.S.

In 2021, after a hiatus, a more widely released version of the game, CosmicBreak Universal, was made live on Steam in the US.

== Story ==
The game is set in the distant future in a parallel dimension called the Cosmic Ark. There is a race of long-dormant, gigantic robots called Arks, which have suddenly awakened to find their galaxy being ruled by the evil Chaos. Since they lay dormant for aeons, the three remaining great Arks of Wisdom, Courage and Strength have been drained of their energy, and now there is only enough energy remaining for one of them to be revived with the power to vanquish the evil Chaos. In order to accomplish this, three different Unions of followers of each of the great Arks have formed, each competing for the revival of their respective Ark and thereby, for the defeat of the Chaos and the fate of the world.

Besides this overarching story, there are several backstories of characters of the game. There is, for example, the background of Crimrose and Ivis, the story of Eihwaz, or the meeting between Eris and Resha among others.

== Gameplay ==
Upon entering the game for the first time, players were originally to choose one of three initial robots, as well as their Union, which they want to join - this has recently been changed, however; players are now allowed to choose several robots from a growing pool of robots - originally, this pool was numbered at twenty-one robots.

There are three Unions:

- Bladine – This Union values courage and loyalty above everything else. It is led by the Guardian Lios who has very strong morals and an extraordinary sense of justice.
- Wizdom – Wizdom is led by the Guardian Icy, a sharp tactician who believes strongly in the superiority of knowledge on the battlefield. Wizdom's members are very apt at using strategy and tactics in the battlefield and are very intelligent.
- Dostrex – Led by the Guardian Dracken who believes in sheer strength to overcome adversaries. Yet in spite of their belief in their own power, members of Dostrex also value honour and don't pick fights with those weaker than themselves.

In the game, players build up an inventory of robots in their garage, from which they choose their Commando, which they will take into battle. Players can choose from four different types of robots, each with different general attributes.

- Air robots feature longer-lasting boosters and better mid-air agility than any of the other types.
- Land robots excel in ground combat and melee attacks. They are very fast and maneuverable.
- Artillery robots are specialized in heavy and long-range firepower.
- Support robots are quite balanced without any major strengths or weaknesses, but they come with special repair skills.

Robots also come in different sizes (S, M & L) and this should be taken into account when customizing and choosing new weapons and parts.

=== Game Modes ===
There are three game modes, Arena mode, Mission mode and Quest mode. In Arena mode, players can fight in matches of up to 60 people at the same time. Players can fight in Union Wars, which use preset rooms and automatic teams, or in Team Fights, where they can create their own rooms and form their own teams. Team Fights also has practice and Capture the Flag modes. In Mission mode, players can go on missions and fight against NPCs of the evil Chaos Army, either by themselves or in teams of up to five people at the same time in the same mission. These missions can be fought in five levels of difficulty. Quest mode gives players the opportunity to go treasure hunting on different planets, battle monsters and find their way through mazes. Several of the quests also allow players to take on the role of one of the characters whose backstories are featured in the anime and manga.

=== Customization ===
Cosmic Break offers players a lot of customization options. There are over 100 different robots to choose from (and that number grows every month or so), most of which have six exchangeable parts (arms, legs, body, head, booster & weapons like the Wonder Bit). With the in-game Editor System, players can mix and match their robots, and experiment with over 300 parts and weapons to assemble their robots. Also, many parts come with inbuilt abilities and/or weapons, which can also be improved by tuning them up. The Skin Editor allows for customized texture painting of the robots and some parts, like the head, may be reshaped using the polygon editor.

=== Communication ===
In Cosmic Break, players have access to a set of animated emoticons, which they can use in the game. There are also voice chat and regular chat functions, which are also available as a means of communication during missions or team matches. The chat has different modes, allowing players to talk to other players near them, to players in the whole area, to the members of their team or clan, or privately to another player. There are also radio messages, which can be sent to teammates during battle. Each message consists of a predetermined English message with the corresponding Japanese dialogue spoken by a Japanese voice actor/actress. Lastly, players can form clans and invite other players of the same Union to join.

== Reception ==
Cosmic Break launched to mixed reviews but its international releases has received heavy criticism by some critics and a majority of its players for its pay-to-win monetisation model through the use of gashapon-style gambling mechanics.

== Closure ==
CyberStep closed its last international version of the game on 5 March 2019.
