= Blades of Time =

2012 video game

- Developer: Gaijin Entertainment
- Publishers: Konami; Gaijin Entertainment (PC); Iceberg Interactive (PC & OS X, EU)
- Producer: Takayuki Fujii
- Platforms: PlayStation 3, Xbox 360, Windows, Mac OS X, Nintendo Switch
- Release: PlayStation 3, Xbox 360: NA: March 6, 2012; JP: March 8, 2012; AU: March 8, 2012; EU: March 16, 2012; Microsoft Windows, OS X: NA: April 20, 2012; EU: May 18, 2012 (PC); EU: May 25, 2012 (OS X); Nintendo Switch: WW: May 14, 2019
- Genres: Action-adventure, hack and slash
- Modes: Single-player, multiplayer

Blades of Time (ブレイズ オブ タイム, Bureizu obu Taimu) is a 2012 hack and slash video game developed by Gaijin Entertainment and published by Konami and Iceberg Interactive for Microsoft Windows, PlayStation 3, Xbox 360 and Mac OS X. It is a reboot/sequel to Gaijin Entertainment's 2007 game X-Blades. In the English version, the lead character is voiced by Miranda Raison.

Blades of Time was released in North America on March 6, 2012, in Japan and Australia on March 8, 2012, and in Europe on March 16, 2012. Versions for Windows and OS X were released on April 20, 2012. A Nintendo Switch version was released in Europe and North America on May 14, 2019.

== Gameplay ==
Blades of Time features an ability called "Time Rewind", which lets the player turn back time and produces a clone that replicates the last actions the protagonist Ayumi made and is vital in solving puzzles and fighting hordes of enemies. The game also features a "Dash" ability which can instantly close the distance between Ayumi and her enemies, as well as travel quickly using environmental features. As the game progresses, Ayumi can unlock more than 40 sets of skills, including attacks and combos, as well as the powerful Order and Chaos forms of magic. The game also offers both a co-op campaign and PvP features.

== Plot ==
A dual sword-wielding treasure hunter named Ayumi (アユミ, Ayumi) finds herself stuck on a mysterious and dangerous island. While rich with bounty, the island is also caught in the throes of Chaos magic. Ayumi soon discovers that it is also the home of thousands of long-held secrets, including special powers and abilities that she can gain for herself. Using everything she can, she must find a way to defeat armies of menacing villains and a multitude of treacherous traps in order to break free of the possessed island's grasp.

== Reception ==
Reception

Aggregate score
| Aggregator | Score | | | |
| Aggregator | NS | PC | PS3 | Xbox 360 |
|---|---|---|---|---|
| Metacritic | 38/100 | 63/100 | 53/100 | 52/100 |

Review scores
| Publication | Score | | | |
| Publication | NS | PC | PS3 | Xbox 360 |
|---|---|---|---|---|
| Destructoid | N/A | N/A | N/A | 6/10 |
| Electronic Gaming Monthly | N/A | N/A | N/A | 6.5/10 |
| Eurogamer | N/A | N/A | N/A | 5/10 |
| Famitsu | N/A | N/A | 32/40 | 32/40 |
| Game Informer | N/A | N/A | 4.5/10 | 4.5/10 |
| GameRevolution | N/A | N/A | N/A | 2.5/5 |
| GameSpot | N/A | N/A | 6/10 | 6/10 |
| GameTrailers | N/A | N/A | N/A | 4.9/10 |
| GameZone | N/A | N/A | 3.5/10 | N/A |
| Official Xbox Magazine (US) | N/A | N/A | N/A | 6/10 |
| PlayStation: The Official Magazine | N/A | N/A | 6/10 | N/A |
| The Digital Fix | N/A | N/A | 4/10 | N/A |

The game received "mixed" reviews on Microsoft Windows, PlayStation 3 and Xbox 360, but received "generally unfavorable" reviews on the Nintendo Switch, according to the review aggregation website Metacritic. In Japan, Famitsu gave the PS3 and Xbox 360 versions a score of all four eights for a total of 32 out of 40. Blades of Time for Nintendo Switch took third place in the list of 15 Worst Reviewed Games of 2019 according to IGN.
