= Cubic Odyssey =

2025 video game

- Cover art, depicting procedurally generated terrain, spaceships, and alien structures
- Developer: Atypical Games
- Publisher: Gaijin Network Ltd
- Director: Andrei Lopata
- Platforms: Windows; PlayStation 5 Xbox Series X/S
- Release: May 14, 2025
- Genres: Sandbox, Survival
- Mode: Single-player

Cubic Odyssey is a sandbox video game developed by Atypical Games and published by Gaijin Network Ltd. The game features a procedurally generated interactive voxel-based open world, in which you have to survive and defend against an intergalactic infection. The game was announced on February 25, 2025 and released on May 14 of the same year for Windows, PlayStation 5 and Xbox Series X/S. A free demo of the game became available on February 24, 2025. Both the demo and the full release received positive reviews.

== Gameplay ==
Cubic Odyssey is a 3D sandbox, action-adventure video game that features star systems with procedurally generated open world planets that can be explored. Planets are made out of voxel blocks that can be destroyed and then placed, allowing the player to terraform the landscape and build structures. Certain blocks can only be destroyed using a specific tool. Various in-game items can be collected from mining blocks, looted, or crafted using specific materials. The game features vehicles, like starships, designed to make transportation on and between planets easier. Various extraterrestrial life can be found on planets, including intelligent aliens that have their own cities and factions and may be friendly or hostile. While progressing through the game, player's skills and abilities can be upgraded and new crafting recipes can be unlocked.

Unlike most other survival games, the player character does not starve or become dehydrated. Instead, the game features batteries that are used to charge certain items; without them, the items become weaker or unusable. New batteries can be looted from enemies or crafted.

Cubic Odyssey has three game modes: survival, creative, and adventure. In survival mode, the main goal of the mode is to stop the Red Darkness - a dangerous infection that spreads across galaxies and threatens to destroy wildlife. In creative mode, the player has access to an unlimited amount of blocks and resources, allowing unrestrictive building. In adventure mode, the player begins on an unknown planet and have to make progress.

The game can be played in single-player or cooperative multiplayer, both locally and online.

== Development ==
Cubic Odyssey was originally set to be an MMO game, but was later scaled down to be a single-player experience. In an interview with GamesRadar+, game director Andrei Lopata said that the team decided to change the direction of the game "once [they] took a realistic look at [their] team size and financial resources" and instead "concentrate on delivering a strong, polished core experience first." He described his vision of Cubic Odyssey as "a mix of heroic adventure, exploration, and survival game."

Cubic Odyssey was announced on February 25, 2025. The same day, an announcement trailer was released and a free demo became available on Steam during Steam Next Fest. On May 14, 2025, the game was released.

Following Cubic Odyssey's launch, Atypical Games published a roadmap of the upcoming updates to the game, promising to bring new content, co-op improvements, terrain generation adjustments and dedicated servers support to the game later down the year. The game was updated to version 1.0.2 in July 2025, featuring improved cooperative play. Another update released in September of that year that added support for map seeds in adventure mode. The ability to host dedicated servers was added in October.

== Reception ==
=== Pre-release ===
During Steam Next Fest, the demo of Cubic Odyssey has received a user rating of 93%, indicating "very positive" reviews. Multiple publications have reviewed the demo. GamesRadar+ praised the game's crafting system and aesthetics, calling the demo experience "rock-solid". As of April 30, 2025, the game has been wishlisted over 100,000 times on Steam.

Various publications compared Cubic Odyssey to similar procedurally generated survival games, such as Minecraft and No Man's Sky. Game director Andrei Lopata noted the comparisons, saying that the team "knew those games would be mentioned" and felt "immense pressure to rise up to the comparison."
