= X-Blades =

2007 video game

- European cover art
- Developers: Gaijin Entertainment; TopWare Interactive (Xbox 360, Mac, Linux)
- Publishers: SouthPeak Games; 1C Company; TopWare Interactive (Xbox 360, Mac, Linux)
- Designers: Alexander Kulagin; Alexey Volynskov; Denis Mamontov
- Composers: Michael Dees; Pavel Stebakov
- Engine: Dagor Engine 1.0
- Platforms: PlayStation 3 Microsoft Windows; Xbox 360 macOS; Linux
- Release: Ониблэйд: RUS: 23 November 2007 (PC); X-Blades: RUS: 6 February 2009; NA: 6 February 2009; NA: 10 February 2009 (PC); EU: 20 February 2009; AU: 20 February 2009 (PS3); JP: 23 April 2009; macOS, Linux: WW: 20 January 2017
- Genres: Action-adventure, hack and slash
- Mode: Single-player

X-Blades is a hack and slash video game developed by Gaijin Entertainment and originally released in November 2007 by 1C Company in the Russian language for Microsoft Windows under the title Ониблэйд (in English - Oniblade). It was later released as X-Blades for PlayStation 3, Xbox 360 and Windows in 2009. The player assumes the role of Ayumi who wields two pistol-blades. The game received mixed reviews from critics. A reboot/sequel, Blades of Time, was released in 2012.

== Gameplay ==
With a pistol-blade in each hand, Ayumi prepares to fight a mob of enemies

X-Blades is a hack-and-slash-style action-adventure game in which the player must fight monsters using a pair of gun blades and spells through indoor and outdoor levels in order to progress. Monsters are encountered in both preset numbers and in areas with Monster Generators which spawn both standard and boss opponents until they are destroyed. Power-ups and coin fragments which grant different upgrades are hidden throughout the game. Power-ups include combat techniques, magic, weapon enhancements, and teleportation. Also earned throughout the game are souls, that function as experience points which can be converted into skills. The skills range from Area of Effect attacks to weapon enchantments. These skills are of either "light" or "dark" alignment and the use of them has an effect on whether the player receives the "light" or "dark" ending.

== Synopsis ==
=== Setting ===
Long, long time ago, in an age that only the gods can now remember, the universe was ruled by two powerful beings that were revered and worshipped by all races– but the brotherly relationship between these two creatures was always in question from the beginning of time, simply because no one knew who the real number 1 was. While the Enlightened was on the side of good, he was helping his people in anyway he could. The Dark One was quite the opposite, full of hate and devilish works– and so the never-ending battle between the Enlightened and the Dark One persisted for centuries. Humans suffered terribly due to this constant combat between the two– combat which shook the universe to its very core. Finally, thanks to a trick, the Enlightened succeeded in banishing the divine power of the Dark One, imprisoning it in an Artifact– but in doing so, the Enlightened lost his own divine powers, because the two divine beings were inseparably linked to one another. This is how two Artifacts came to be hidden in a huge Temple – and how the Enlightened prevented the downfall of the entire universe. However, these two artifacts contain absolute power – both good and evil. Any human being who comes in contact with the powerful stones will be horribly cursed – and the power of darkness will once again be awakened.

The game begins when a map which has been lost for countless years suddenly turns up– and it shows the location of the artifacts. The adventurer Ayumi starts searching for the immensely valuable stones. Powerful forces against which she is helpless threaten to awake in her body. Now it's up to her to discover what the secret of the curse is – and at last defeat the darkness.

=== Plot ===
Ayumi uses the map to find her way to some ruins. In the heart of the ruins lies an artifact guarded by the Light, a lion-like being, who warns her that the power of the artifact is life-threatening to humans. Ayumi ignores the warning and touches the artifact anyway. A black ooze infects Ayumi with a curse, causing the Light to try to kill her. She fights the Light but is defeated when she is overwhelmed by the agony of the curse. She finds herself in a white void but is overwhelmed by the black ooze.

Ayumi awakes on an abandoned coastline. She eventually makes her way to a gazebo in the nearby ruins and finds herself trapped in it as it is filled with spikes. She is rescued by Jay, an adept of the Light, who is searching for an artifact of the Light. Ayumi speculates that this might be able to cure her curse, and Jay offers to try to cure it himself. Instead, he provokes a violent reaction by the curse and flees. Ayumi makes her way to the Artifact and finds that it is guarded by the Dark, who is battling Jay. The Dark wounds Jay and then turns to attack Ayumi, hoping to regain his lost power. She defeats him and touches the Artifact. She finds herself once again in the white void, but this time is accompanied by the Light, who wakes her up.

She wakes up, discovering that the curse is gone. However, Jay is furious, saying that the curse had not been destroyed, but merely displaced. He then runs off, leaving Ayumi to eventually make her way to the gates of a castle, where she again faces the Dark yet again. The gates to the castle are broken down by Jay, who is now possessed by the dark magic of the curse. He destroys the Dark and takes its power. Ayumi and this Dark Jay fight, with Dark Jay retreating into the castle. Ayumi follows, facing him in the main hall of the castle.

The game's ending is dependent on the upgrades the player chooses during the course of the experience. If the player buys any of the Dark spells, then the "Bad" Ending is shown. If none of the Dark spells were unlocked, then the "Good" Ending is shown.

In the "Bad" Ending, Ayumi kills Jay. She mourns his death, wishing that she could have done differently.

In the "Good" Ending, Ayumi knocks back Jay and is overwhelmed by the power of the Light. This power overwhelms Jay as well. The two ascend in spheres into the sky. A flash of light then explodes outward, purging the power of the Dark from the world. Ayumi and Jay are then seen watching the sunrise together.

== Development ==
X-Blades was originally published under the name Oniblade as a PC exclusive on 23 November 2007 in Russia by 1C Publishing. Oniblade was developed by Gaijin Entertainment as the first action/anime-style game in Russia and uses the Dagor Engine. In February 2008, SouthPeak Games announced that X-Blades would also be released on seventh-gen consoles in late 2008.

James Seaman, managing director at Topware Interactive, was quoted as saying "Our goal was to create stylistic characters and artwork and to mix that bombastic visual style with lightning fast action. The result is a killer title that gamers and animation fans won't be able to put down."

== Reception ==
Reception

Aggregate score
Aggregator	Score		
Aggregator	PC	PS3	Xbox 360
Metacritic	54/100	50/100	50/100

Review scores
Publication	Score		
Publication	PC	PS3	Xbox 360
Destructoid	N/A	N/A	5.5/10
Famitsu	N/A	26/40	26/40
Game Informer	N/A	5.5/10	5.5/10
GameSpot	N/A	N/A	6.5/10
GameTrailers	N/A	N/A	4.8/10
GameZone	6.5/10	6.5/10	6.9/10
IGN	6/10	6/10	6/10
Official Xbox Magazine (US)	N/A	N/A	4/10
PC Gamer (UK)	49%	N/A	N/A
PlayStation: The Official Magazine	N/A	2/5	N/A
411Mania	N/A	N/A	4.5/10

Electronic Gaming Monthly called its "lead character, Ayumi...a typical sassy, scantily clad, smart-talking bad girl, who proves once and for all that a bikini-thong combination is suitable armor for taking on hordes of...just about anything." GameDaily featured Ayumi as one of their "Almost Famous Hotties" pleased with her artistic depiction yet dissatisfied with both the game and her personality.

X-Blades received "mixed" reviews on all platforms according to the review aggregation website Metacritic. IGN reviewer Nate Ahearn was displeased with the repetitive hack-and-slash gameplay, mediocre special effects, annoying controls, and weak AI. G4's X-Play said of the PC version, "We can only recommend this to people who are interested in quitting videogames completely." It also received one of X-Play's "Golden Mullet Awards" as one of the worst games of the year, that same year, in the category of game that "sounds like X-play when you say it fast". They noted that the main character's only power is that she does not wear pants, it was somewhat of a Tomb Raider knock off, as well as taking certain gameplay elements like switching from sword and gun attacks during battle from Devil May Cry. According to them the whole game seemed like something one would expect to get from an amateur teenager game creator. They also noted that the game uses the overused "I'm the best there is" line. In Japan, Famitsu gave the console versions each a score of two sevens and two sixes for a total of 26 out of 40.

The game was also mentioned in Zero Punctuation, when Graham Stark of LoadingReadyRun (as part of an Unskippable/Zero Punctuation crossover) made a brief negative review noting both the similarities to previous games God of War and Heavenly Sword as well as the use of female anatomy. It was also the subject of Unskippable the following week, making light of the game's stilted dialogue and confusing chronology in the opening cutscene.

== Downloadable content ==
Three levels, already packaged on the PlayStation 3 version of the game, were released as the "Sky Levels" on the Xbox Live Marketplace at the end of March 2009. The CEO of Topware Interactive, the game's lead designer, stated that an expansion pack for X-Blades was being developed, though no information about what the pack would contain has been released.

== See also ==
- Blades of Time
