= Star Conflict =

2012 video game

- Developer: Star Gem Inc.
- Publisher: Gaijin Entertainment
- Engine: Hammer Engine
- Platforms: Microsoft Windows; Mac OS X; Linux; SteamOS
- Release: Microsoft Windows: WW: July 24, 2012; SteamOS, Linux, OS X: WW: February 27, 2013
- Genres: Action, MMO, space sim
- Modes: Multiplayer, open world

Star Conflict is a free-to-play dynamic massively multiplayer online space action game. The core of the game is PvP spaceships battles, PvE (Co-Op) missions and an open world.

Star Conflict has been developed by the Russian company Targem Games (StarGem department) and published by Gaijin Entertainment. Initially released as open beta on July 24, 2012, it has been available on Steam since February 27, 2013. The release took place on September 4, 2014 (Version 1.0).

In April 2026, an announcement was made to the Steam news page that the game would be shut down on October 10, 2026.

== Gameplay ==
The player controls combat spaceships with different roles. Each player can develop abilities, establish specialized skills, and perfect tactics. The game has PvP and PvE game modes, as well as an "open world" sandbox. There is also a "Sector Conquest" mode, involving corporations (clans). This action space game also has MOBA elements.

=== PvP mode ===
Players are divided into two opposing teams and must perform a specific task, such as capture all the beacons, destroy all enemy ships, etc. There are several PvP modes with different combat missions, terms and conditions. The higher the rank a player's ship is, the more kinds of battles and maps will be available for them. The number of players in each team depending on the game mode varies from 6 to 32.

At the start of the battle, the server automatically divides the players into teams according to their level and skill. Players can form their own squad in the lobby and go into the battle in this group.

=== Open Space ===
This mode was launched as a large-scale expansion, entitled "Invasion" on September 4, 2014. According to the storyline, the alien Biomorphs (a new NPC race) invaded known space. To counter this threat, the factions had to mobilize all of the mercenaries (the players).

The game world consists of many separate locations, connected by warp gates. It is a mode where players can undock from a station and travel around the various systems and sectors to defend allied space colonies against an ancient and malevolent alien race. In contrast to all other modes, players are given almost complete freedom of action. In some sectors Players can attack any ship, including the ships of other players, find or steal from other players valuable items, which are used for crafting, completing missions and fighting aliens. Space is inhabited by NPC pirates and aliens. Sectors controlled by factions are guarded by police. There are hidden alien sectors, that can be reached only through special alien gates.

=== Missions ===
A co-op PvE mode, where players fight against enemy NPCs and bosses. The missions involve teams of 4 players. Each mission consists of several stages. Each stage may have special conditions. For instance, permanent hull and shield recovery or increased damage power. There are currently 9 scenarios available. A special part of the missions is "Spec-Ops". It is a raid against giant Alien flagships. There are 3 available scenarios at the moment, where each of the bosses has unique characteristics and behavior. A maximum of 12 players can take part in these missions.

=== Sector Conquest ===
Sector Conquest represents epic battles between Corporations, a community of pilots, for conquering and holding a location on the gigantic map with more than 200 sectors. Control over the location grants extra income to the Corporation. Corporations are a mainstay in Star Conflict. Joining a Corporation enters the players into a group of players, much like a guild.

In order to establish control over open world sectors a corporation has to build a Dreadnought. Dreadnoughts are huge ships with destructive fire-power. They have a variety of systems, which can be constructed and damaged in combat, for example their different weapons: torpedoes, combat drones and guns of various calibers. These massive ships and their immense damage output are perfect for interstellar PvP battles.

=== Custom Battle ===
Pilots can create a battle with their own settings. They can play against NPCs or other players that can be invited by the host. Battles with custom settings in the PvP mode do not bring players any income, and are mostly used for training, holding tournaments or other events.

== Spaceships ==
There are 4 basic ship classes: interceptors, fighters, frigates and destroyers. They are fundamentally different in external view, size, control, speed, etc. Each class has a variety of different modules available, weapons and features, designed for certain tasks. These variations determine the role of the ship on the battlefield.

- Interceptors - the smallest and fastest ships in the game. They have little armor, but they successfully compensate for this drawback with effective maneuvering, powerful equipment and high speed. There are 3 roles for these craft: ECM ships, Recon ships and Covert Ops.
- Fighters - these ships are of medium size, and have increased survivability. They possess powerful weapons, but are inferior in speed and maneuverability to interceptors. The roles of these are Command ships, Gunships and Tacklers.
- Frigates - these are big and slow ships. They have enhanced armor and powerful weapons. There are Engineering ships (buffers), Long Range ships (snipers) and Guard ships (tanks).
- Destroyers - extra large ships with a paltry speed, superior to other classes of ships in all respects, except for the speed and maneuverability. Depending on the model of the destroyer, they can simultaneously use 2-8 guns. The modules resemble turrets, which provide many more ways to inflict damage to enemies, but they can be disabled if they receive too much damage.

== Storyline ==
The galaxy is divided between the militant star empires and independent mercenary groups. In a remote corner of the galaxy – Sector 1337, the area of the dead – a world has been left behind. Here, the ruins of a great civilization of aliens have recently been discovered. Mercenaries and adventurers from all over the galaxy are flocking into the sector without consideration of the danger.
