= CRSED: F.O.A.D. =

2019 battle royale video game

CRSED: Cuisine Royale
- Developer: Darkflow Studio
- Publisher: Gaijin Entertainment
- Platforms: Microsoft Windows, Linux, PlayStation 4, PlayStation 5, Xbox One, Xbox Series X/S, Nintendo Switch, Android
- Release: December 12, 2019
- Genres: First-person shooter, third-person shooter, battle royale
- Mode: Multiplayer

CRSED: Cuisine Royale (Cuisine Royale Second Edition: Cuisine Royale) (formerly known as CRSED: F.O.A.D. (Cuisine Royale Second Edition: Fulfillment of All Desires)) is a battle royale multiplayer online shooter video game developed by Latvian studio Darkflow Studio and published by Gaijin Entertainment. It was previously known as Cuisine Royale. The game was officially launched on December 19, 2019, and was relaunched under a new name in December 2020. It is a free-to-play game with optional microtransactions.

== Gameplay ==
CRSED: Cuisine Royale puts several dozens of players on a map surrounded by a shrinking ring of death and makes them fight each other until there is only one standing. Players use weapons, items and vehicles they find right on the map. Unlike other battle royale games, there is no parachuting/insertion phase and players are spawned randomly all across the map right after matchmaking is finished. It's possible to play in both first-person and third-person modes, but in the latter case players are accompanied by flying camera drones to uncover positions of those who peek around corners.

It's possible to play solo, duo or in a team consisting of up to five players.

While all the weapons in the game are based on real ones (half of them came right from Enlisted), players can also use supernatural items (i.e. lunar gravity boots or health boosting cigar) and supernatural skills (i.e. zombie summoning, temporary invisibility or turning into a beast).

Most of the skills (called "signs" and "rituals") are unlocked by grinding through the game, but some are unique to one of the seven available characters (called "Champions").

The tournament characters are fighting at what is called F.O.A.D. (or Fulfillment of All Desires), according to the developers, but there is almost no information on what it's really about inside the game itself.

There are 4 maps available: summer and winter versions of Normandy, Island of Siberia, and Mexico.

== Development ==
At first the game became available in 2018 as an April Fools' joke based on the engine of Enlisted, another online shooter under development by the studio at the time. In June 2018 publisher decided to release Cuisine Royale as a standalone title and started the open beta test soon after that. The game was officially launched on PC, PlayStation 4 and Xbox One in December 2019. In January 2020 Cuisine Royale became the third most downloaded free-to-play title in PlayStation store.

Originally the game was promoted as a parody title mocking PUBG and other free-to-play shooters and was mostly known as a shooter where you can fight using kitchenware as both weapons and armor, but in 2019 the developers gradually dropped most of the kitchen-related items and jokes (i.e. replaced comical shopping plastic bags with tactical bags). In December 2020, the name was changed to CRSED: F.O.A.D.. All kitchenware screenshots are now no longer available at the official website.

CRSED: Cuisine Royale is available on Xbox Series X|S and PlayStation 5 via backwards compatibility with native versions coming soon. PC version boasts DLSS support that gives 40% performance boost in CRSED: F.O.A.D. according to Nvidia. The game also comes with AMD FSR support. Native Linux version is rendered through Vulkan.

In September 2022, it released its Android version.

== Reception ==
The PS4 version of Cuisine Royale received an aggregate score of 73/100 on Metacritic.

According to TheSixthAxis, the game "doesn't do anything too different from the battle royales that came before it, but it really leans into its own brand of humour", while TheXboxHub called it "a solid, enjoyable game with a wacky persona". PC Gamer stated that "Part of the appeal, at least for me, is the lack of waiting around for the game to get started". GameSpew mentioned that, "while the push to purchase/unlock items can be irritating, there's still a lot of fun to be had here".
