= Skydive: Proximity Flight =

2013 video game

- Developer(s): Gaijin Entertainment
- Publisher(s): Gaijin Entertainment (PSN); TopWare Interactive (XBLA)
- Platform(s): PlayStation 3 (PlayStation Network), Xbox 360 (Xbox Live Arcade)
- Release: PlayStation 3: NA: October 1, 2013; EU: October 2, 2013; Xbox 360; March 14, 2014
- Genre(s): Sports
- Mode(s): Single-player

Skydive: Proximity Flight is a sports video game developed by Gaijin Entertainment for PlayStation Network in 2013, and for Xbox Live Arcade in 2014.

== Reception ==
Reception

Aggregate score
Aggregator	Score
Metacritic	(PS3) 62/100 (X360) 56/100

Review scores
Publication	Score
Destructoid	(PS3) 7.5/10
GameRevolution	(X360) 7/10
Official Xbox Magazine (UK)	(X360) 4/10
Official Xbox Magazine (US)	(X360) 7.5/10
Push Square	(PS3) 4/10

The game received "mixed" reviews on both platforms according to the review aggregation website Metacritic.
