= Apache: Air Assault =

2010 video game

- German cover
- Developer: Gaijin Entertainment
- Publisher: Activision
- Engine: Dagor Engine
- Platforms: Microsoft Windows, PlayStation 3, Xbox 360
- Release: NA: November 16, 2010; EU: November 19, 2010 (PS3, X360); AU: February 23, 2011; EU: December 2, 2011 (PC)
- Genre: Combat flight simulator
- Modes: Single-player, multiplayer

Apache: Air Assault is a 2010 combat flight simulator video game for Microsoft Windows, PlayStation 3 and Xbox 360. It was developed by then-Russian developer Gaijin Entertainment, which is most famous for its vehicle combat MMO game War Thunder, and published by Activision. Players may pilot several types of Apache attack helicopters. The primary goal of most missions is to stop terrorist attacks in fictional, volatile war-ravaged regions.

== Gameplay ==
=== Aircraft ===
The main web page for the game shows several different aircraft including A-10 Warthog and drones.

All playable aircraft can be customized with decals. In addition, the player can choose different control layouts in correspondence to their controller.

=== Multiplayer ===
Apache supports local and online multiplayer. During the local multiplayer, two players can play on the same console sharing the same view as pilot and gunner in one helicopter.

Online multiplayer allows co-op missions where each player pilots their own helicopter up to a maximum of four players.

== Reception ==
Reception

Aggregate score
| Aggregator | Score | | |
| Aggregator | PC | PS3 | Xbox 360 |
|---|---|---|---|
| Metacritic | 64/100 | 66/100 | 70/100 |

Review scores
| Publication | Score | | |
| Publication | PC | PS3 | Xbox 360 |
|---|---|---|---|
| 4Players | 71% | 71% | 71% |
| GameRevolution | N/A | C+ | C+ |
| GameSpot | N/A | 7.5/10 | 7.5/10 |
| GamesRadar+ | N/A | 2/5 | 2/5 |
| GameZone | N/A | N/A | 7/10 |
| IGN | N/A | 7.5/10 | 7.5/10 |
| Jeuxvideo.com | 15/20 | 15/20 | 15/20 |
| Official Xbox Magazine (US) | N/A | N/A | 5/10 |
| PC Gamer (UK) | 75% | N/A | N/A |
| PC PowerPlay | 4/10 | N/A | N/A |
| PlayStation: The Official Magazine | N/A | 4/10 | N/A |
| TeamXbox | N/A | N/A | 8/10 |
| 411Mania | N/A | 7/10 | N/A |
| Metro | N/A | N/A | 8/10 |

The game received "mixed or average reviews" on all platforms according to the review aggregation website Metacritic.

PlayStation Weekly's Chace Frost awarded the PlayStation 3 version a bronze trophy. He stated that the graphics were above average, but the multiplayer was lacking.
