= Birds of Steel =

2012 video game

- Developer: Gaijin Entertainment
- Publisher: Konami
- Platforms: PlayStation 3, Xbox 360
- Release: JP: March 8, 2012; NA: March 13, 2012; EU: March 16, 2012; AU: March 29, 2012
- Genre: Combat flight simulator
- Modes: Single-player, multiplayer

Birds of Steel (蒼の英雄 Birds of Steel, Ao no Eiyū: Birds of Steel) is a combat flight simulator video game created by Gaijin Entertainment and published by Konami. It was released in March 2012 for PlayStation 3 and Xbox 360.

The game includes more than one hundred non-fictional planes, twenty historical missions, and hundreds of procedural missions over sixteen different locations, including Pearl Harbor and Wake Island. It has single player, four-player cooperative, and online multiplayer modes. The game consists of three difficulty settings, which change the way planes are flown: "Simplified", an arcade play style; "Realistic", a mix between an arcade play style and a simulation play style; and "Simulator", in which the planes handle as closely to real life as possible. AI difficulty is not affected by the selected play style.

Birds of Steel provided the base work for Gaijin Entertainment's massively multiplayer online (MMO) game War Thunder.

== Gameplay ==
Birds of Steel gives players command over famous warbirds of the World War II period, such as the F4F Wildcat and the A6M Zero. Players are allowed to choose their difficulty level before entering a battle, which only effects the flight parameters for the player's aircraft and not the difficulty of the AI. The choices of limited ammunition and fuel are selected separately, regardless of the difficulty level.

Simplified

Simplified uses an arcade-like physics model, e.g. the plane can never enter a stall or a spin and there are no aerodynamic effects such as wind turbulence and propeller torque. There are also no g-force effects on the plane or pilot, and the aircraft won't experience flutter when diving. Activating the throttle, or WEP (War Emergency Power), provides a major boost in flight speed. However, abusing WEP can cause the engine to overheat, causing a short delay before it can be used again.

Realistic

Realistic offers a far greater challenge than Simplified, as the player can enter a stall or a spin easily if reckless with the controls. g-forces are applied in this mode; the pilot can black- or red-out from pulling sustained G's for extended periods, resulting in the screen becoming filled with either color, obscuring the player's vision. Aircraft can experience flutter and break apart if flying above their historical structural limits, and can rip their wings if pulled too hard, especially at high speed. WEP is not available for all aircraft, and doesn't provide as significant a boost in speed.

Simulator

Simulator is the most realistic difficulty as the HUD elements are stripped from the screen, the aircraft is incredibly sensitive, engine management is more complex, and manual trim is required to keep your aircraft level. Various HUD elements that provide warnings, or help the player are removed; elements such as: aim prediction, onscreen warnings, onscreen radar, and aircraft blips. The player needs to rely on their knowledge of aerial combat in order to succeed on missions. Weight and durability is accurately modeled across all types. Fighters are lighter and more agile, interceptors are fast and effective climbers, and bombers are durable, slow, heavy aircraft.

== Reception ==
Reception

Aggregate score
Aggregator	Score	
Aggregator	PS3	Xbox 360
Metacritic	73/100	77/100

Review scores
Publication	Score	
Publication	PS3	Xbox 360
4Players	83%	83%
Destructoid	N/A	7.5/10
Famitsu	32/40	32/40
Game Informer	7/10	7/10
GamesMaster	82%	N/A
IGN	8.5/10	8.5/10
MeriStation	8.3/10	8.3/10
Official Xbox Magazine (US)	N/A	8.5/10
PlayStation: The Official Magazine	7/10	N/A
The Telegraph	N/A	4/5
The Digital Fix	8/10	N/A
Metro	N/A	8/10

The Xbox 360 version received "generally favorable reviews", while the PlayStation 3 version received "mixed or average reviews", according to the review aggregation website Metacritic. IGN Australia praised the graphics, sound, gameplay and lasting appeal but said that the presentation lacked a little spark. In Japan, Famitsu gave it a score of one nine, one eight, one seven, and one eight for a total of 32 out of 40.
