= Adrenalin: Extreme Show =

2005 video game

- Developer: Gaijin Entertainment
- Publishers: 1C Company, Frogster Interactive Pictures
- Release: 2005
- Genre: Racing
- Mode: Single-player

Adrenalin: Extreme Show, also known as Adrenalin Rush or simply Adrenalin, is a 2005 racing video game developed by Gaijin Entertainment and published by 1C Company and Frogster Interactive Pictures. The game was released for Windows in Russia (2005), Czechia, Germany and Slovakia (2006), and France (2007).

== Gameplay ==
In Adrenalin: Extreme Show, players take on the role of a young woman competing in a reality TV racing competition. Twelve contestants battle across unconventional courses where finishing first is less important than dazzling the audience. Success comes from performing stunts—jumps, drifts, and acrobatics—while colliding with rivals is not only common but encouraged. A special "Adrenalin" function allows players to chain spectacular maneuvers, such as driving on two wheels, rolling vehicles, or even unleashing electrical shocks to damage nearby opponents. Combining Adrenalin with Nitro boosts enables turbo acceleration, pushing cars to extreme speeds on both urban and wild tracks. The racing itself is deliberately rough. Cars are difficult to control at high velocity, crashes are frequent, and nighttime races suffer from poor visibility. Precision and finesse are largely absent, leaving players to barrel forward through confusion and collisions. Beyond racing, the game includes light management elements: players must grow their popularity, choose sponsors wisely, and manage their pilot's career. Vehicles can be customized in detail. Multiplayer is limited to local network play.

== Development ==
The game was showcased at E3 2005. It was developed in more than 18 months.

== Reception ==
Reception

Review scores
Publication	Score
Gamezone (Germany)	7.8/10
Jeuxvideo.com	6/20
PC Games	58/100
