= Braveheart (2010 video game) =

- Developer(s): Gaijin Entertainment
- Publisher(s): Gaijin Entertainment
- Platform(s): iOS
- Release: December 2, 2010
- Genre(s): Action role-playing game
- Mode(s): Single-player

Braveheart is an action role-playing game developed and published by then-Russian video game developer Gaijin Entertainment for iOS in 2010.

== Reception ==
Reception

Aggregate score
Aggregator	Score
Metacritic	(iPad) 75/100 (iPhone) 68/100

Review scores
Publication	Score
Eurogamer	7/10
IGN	7.5/10
Macworld	4/5 stars
Pocket Gamer	3/5 stars

The iPad version received "generally favorable reviews", while the iPhone version received "average" reviews, according to the review aggregation website Metacritic.
