= CyberStep =

Japanese video game developer

CyberStep, Inc.
- Native name: サイバーステップ
- Type: Public
- Industry: Video Game Development and Publishing
- Founded: April 1, 2000
- Headquarters: Suginami-ku, Tokyo, Japan
- Key people: Rui Sato (President and Board Member)
- Subsidiaries: CyberStep Comm. Inc. (United States of America); CyberStep Ent. Inc. (Korea); CyberStep Games B.V. (Netherlands); CyberStep China Inc. (China); CyberStep Brasil Ltd. (Brazil); CyberStep Hong Kong Ltd. (Hong Kong); CyberStep Philippines, Inc. (Philippines)
- Website: corp.cyberstep.com

CyberStep, Inc. is a Japanese global online video game developer and publisher. The company was founded on April 1, 2000.

== History ==
CyberStep is a developer and publisher of online video games. Headquartered in Japan, CyberStep has local branches in the United States, Taiwan, Korea, the Netherlands and Indonesia. The company was founded on April 1, 2000.

CyberStep has developed seven online games: notably the third-person shooter Cosmic Break in 2008, the action MMORPG Onigiri in 2013, and Dawn of the Breakers in 2018. In 2017, Cyberstep released its English language version of Toreba, where online players can pay to control crane games to win prizes.

On March 14, 2023, CyberStep launched a new visual novel game brand, Rabbitfoot, with a focus on virtual YouTubers.

== Controversy ==
CyberStep has developed a notorious reputation internationally by critics and players of its games for its gashapon-based monetisation model.

In 2020, Cyberstep faced lawsuits regarding employees tampering with machines to prevent wins in its online crane game, Toreba.
