= Gaijin Entertainment =

Hungarian video game developer

- Type: Privately held company
- Industry: Video game industry
- Founded: 2002; 24 years ago in Russia
- Headquarters: Budapest, Hungary
- Key people: Anton Yudintsev (founder), Kirill Yudintsev (founder)
- Products: Video games
- Number of employees: 201–500 (2023)
- Website: gaijinent.com

Gaijin Entertainment is a Hungarian video game developer headquartered in Budapest. It was founded in Russia in 2002. The company is mostly known for War Thunder, Crossout, Star Conflict, CRSED: Cuisine Royale (formerly known as Cuisine Royale and CRSED: F.O.A.D.), Active Matter and Enlisted. Gaijin Entertainment is one of the founding members of the Cyprus game association.

== History ==
Gaijin Entertainment was founded in Russia in 2002 by Anton and Kirill Yudintsev, whose first big project was the PC racing game Adrenaline. After the successful launch of War Thunder in 2012, an office in Germany was established, to manage global operations and marketing. The company moved their distribution business from Moscow to Budapest around 2015, and their development headquarters followed shortly after. According to Hungarian tax records, Gaijin had 42 employees in Hungary by January 2022 and 56 employees by January 2023.

Presently, all Gaijin online games are operated from Germany, Cyprus and Hungary, while the development is scattered across Europe. The company now has six offices in total: in Karlsruhe (Germany), Larnaca (Cyprus), Budapest (Hungary), Riga (Latvia), Dubai (UAE) and Yerevan (Armenia). The company has around 200 employees split between those offices, with 60 of them based at the Hungarian HQ.

Gaijin Entertainment group generated 2.6% of all Hungarian software industry profit in 2020.

While Gaijin have produced a few single-player games in the 2000s, the company is now focused on free-to-play online titles. According to László Perneky, Gaijin's lead programmer, "Those who can decide on projects at the company mostly like to play multiplayer games".

== Origin of company name ==
Gaijin Entertainment name comes from the Japanese word for foreigner. According to Anton Yudintsev, he was dreaming to enter the Japanese market one day while staying true to their roots as a European company and accept their position of an outsider there. Gaijin actually entered the Japanese market with the release of anime-style action game X-Blades in 2009.

Gaijin's logo features a snail that is a reference to Issa Kobayashi's haiku, translated by R.H. Blyth as:

O snail

Climb Mount Fuji

But slowly, slowly!

(Katatsumuri / sorosoro nobore / Fuji no yama; 蝸牛/そろそろ登れ/富士の山)

== Games ==
Game	Developer	Release year	Description	Platforms
Bumer: Sorvannye bashni	Gaijin	2003	Game based on the movie Bimmer (2003)	Windows
Adrenalin: Extreme Show	Gaijin	2005	"Adrenalin is a game that successfully blends the genres of thrilling adrenaline-pumping racing and an economic management sim."	Windows
X-Blades	Gaijin	2009	Fantasy game.	Windows, PS3, Xbox 360
IL-2 Sturmovik: Birds of Prey	Gaijin	2009	World War II combat flight simulator.	Windows, PS3, Xbox 360
Anarchy: Rush Hour	Gaijin	2010	Arcade racing game.	PS3
Modern Conflict	Gaijin	2010	Mobile real time strategy game.	iOS, Android
Apache: Air Assault	Gaijin	2010	Combat flight simulation game based on the Apache AH-64D Longbow attack helicopter.	Windows, PS3, Xbox 360
Braveheart	Gaijin	2010	Action-role-playing game.	iOS
Blades of Time	Gaijin	2012	Spiritual successor of X-Blades, introducing a darker setting and more realistic tone.	Windows, macOS, PS3, Xbox 360, Nintendo Switch
Birds of Steel	Gaijin	2012	World War II combat flight simulator.	PS3, Xbox 360
Star Conflict	Star Gem.	2012	Space flight simulator MMO.	Windows, macOS, Linux, SteamOS
War Thunder	Gaijin	2013	Cross platform matching 20 and 21 century aerial, ground and naval vehicle simulator MMO.	Windows, macOS, Linux, PS4, Xbox One, Shield Android TV (discontinued), PS5, Xbox Series X/S
Skydive: Proximity Flight	Gaijin	2013	Wingsuit simulator.	PS3, Xbox 360
Crossout	Targem Games	2016	A vehicular combat MMO currently in open beta. It is available as an early access release.	Windows, PS4, Xbox One, PS5, Xbox Series X/S
CRSED: Cuisine Royale	DarkFlow Software	2018	Battle Royale	Windows, Linux, PS4, Xbox One, PS5, Xbox Series X/S, Nintendo Switch
Enlisted	DarkFlow Software	2020	First-person WWII shooter.	Windows, PS4, Xbox One, Xbox Series X/S, PS5
Crossout Mobile	Targem Games	2022	Mobile spin-off of Crossout, a vehicular combat MMO.	iOS, Android
War Thunder Mobile (formerly known as War Thunder Edge)	Gaijin	2023	20th and 21st century aerial, ground and naval vehicle simulator MMO.	iOS, Android
Modern Warships (PC version)	Artstorm	2023	Modern and futuristic warships MMO.	Windows, iOS, Android
MWT: Tank Battles	Artstorm	2024	Modern and futuristic ground and air battles MMO.	iOS, Android
Age of Water	Three Whales Studio	2024 (Early Access), 2025 (full release)	Nautical online adventure game.	Windows, PS5, Xbox Series X/S
Cubic Odyssey	Atypical Games	2025	Voxel sandbox adventure.	Windows, PS5, Xbox Series X/S
Aces of Thunder	Gaijin	2026	WW1 and WW2 VR combat flight simulator.	Windows, PS5
Active Matter	Gaijin	2025 (Early Access), 2026 (planned Steam)	Horror/sci-fi themed PvPvE extraction shooter.	Windows, PS5, Xbox Series X/S

== Dagor Engine ==
The Dagor Engine is an open-source game engine used by Gaijin Entertainment in War Thunder, Enlisted, CRSED: F.O.A.D. and other titles. It was open sourced under the BSD-3 license in 2023. The original version of the engine was developed by Gaijin Entertainment, and in 2005 the separate company Dagor Technologies was established for continued development. Currently the engine incorporates technology such as the PhysX physics engine and has been updated to version 6.5 since the release of War Thunder. Gaijin's Hungarian office is responsible for the further development of the engine.

== Controversies ==
The company gained notoriety for pursuing legal action against the owner of gaijin.com, an unaffiliated website that predates the company by seven years. The complaint expired and was automatically withdrawn in November 2013.

On 21 June 2020, adult actress Eva Elfie was sponsored by Gaijin's War Thunder, which sparked light controversy within the community. On 23 September 2022, an official Eva Elfie decal has been added to War Thunder, further strengthening relations between Gaijin and the porn actress.

In January 2021, after the logos of War Thunder and Crossout were seen in a video by Donbas YouTube channel "High Caliber Mayhem", Gaijin was accused of indirectly financing pro-Russian separatists in the war in Donbas. High Caliber Mayhem has denied any links to the separatist armed forces and published an explanation claiming that all the money from all advertisements on that channel were spent on humanitarian aid for civilians. The video showing the War Thunder advertisement was removed from High Caliber Mayhem's YouTube channel.

In response to the controversy, Gaijin stated "We do not provide political support to anyone anywhere. We know nothing about politics and prefer to stay out of it. Our agency that ordered an ad in the video in question took it down when they realized they might drag us into a political discussion."

Following an in-game economic change on 16 May 2023, a large amount of War Thunder players began revolting against the developers by review bombing the game on multiple platforms, such as Steam and Google. Since the changes have been announced, there have been over 65,000 negative reviews on Steam, dropping the overall rating from "Mostly Positive" to "Mixed" and the recent rating from "Mostly Positive" to "Overwhelmingly Negative", as of 22 May. In response, Gaijin has since reverted the planned economic change on 18 May, posted statements regarding the issue and player progression on 19 May, discouraging players from participating in review bombing, announced a revision of the economy for mid-summer 2023 and issued an apology. Gaijin also removed Steam from the supported platforms on War Thunder's official website. Steam hid the reviews posted after 19 May and marked them off-topic as the update in question was no longer a part of the game starting from that date. Some players launched a subreddit called War Thunder Player Union and started campaigning for 2 weeks of "strike action" starting on Friday 26 May 2023 and ending Thursday 8 June 2023. War Thunder Player Union had 14,900 members as of 26 May.
