= Crossout =

2017 vehicular combat Video Game

- Developer: Targem Games
- Publisher: Gaijin Entertainment
- Engine: Targem Engine 2.0; Unity (Mobile)
- Platforms: Microsoft Windows, Xbox One, PlayStation 4 PlayStation 5, iOS, Xbox Series X/S
- Release: Closed Beta: April 5, 2016; Open Beta: May 30, 2017
- Genre: Vehicular combat
- Mode: Multiplayer

Crossout is a free-to-play vehicular combat video game focused on building and driving custom vehicles in PvP and PvE scenarios. It is developed by Targem Games and published by Gaijin Entertainment for Android, IOS, Windows, PlayStation 4, Xbox One and Xbox Series X/S. As of 2021, PlayPark, part of AsiaSoft, acquired the game's server of Asian territories.

== Gameplay ==
The gameplay is about assembling vehicles with different parts, weapons, and modules awarded throughout the game or bought through the in-game store (via microtransactions) or market (via in-game currency). The player can drive their own custom vehicle in multiplayer gamemodes in PvP battles, or against AI opponents in PvE modes. The cars are fully destructible, weapons, armor and wheels can be knocked off, reducing the capabilities of the vehicle.

The player starts the game inside of their garage, which acts as a main menu where they can choose game modes, access their own vehicles, browse the in-game shop and market, try out vehicles shared by the community, and check on their general progress with the game. They can also head outside into the range to drive around and shoot targets for practice.

Vehicles are built out of hardware (functional parts such as weapons, cabins, wheels), structural parts (armor), frames, and decorations. The frames form the chassis of the vehicle; the cabin, which also has a built-in engine, provides power and energy for modules and weapons; weapons deal damage and modules provide additional capabilities, such as faster reloading, bonus engine power, stealth, radar, etc. Armor shields and connects other parts, and most armor parts increase the health of the vehicle. Decorations provide an experience bonus. Movement parts include wheels, tracks, augers, legs, hovers (downward pointing jet engines that allow the vehicle to hover at low altitude) that allow movement with varying speed and agility.

Cabins have tonnage and power limits, and adding movement parts increases tonnage (up to a mass limit). Each vehicle has a cabin durability value, a sum of cabin base health and armor part health, which is decreased every time the cabin is damaged or armor parts are destroyed. Some armor parts do not increase durability when added and also do not decrease it when destroyed. The vehicle is destroyed when its cabin is destroyed (cabin durability drops to 0).

The vehicles are divided into archetypes: light, medium and heavy, usually based on their cabin type. Light vehicles rely on speed and agility to avoid and deal damage, while heavy ones can afford to place a lot of heavy armor and rely on being able to take damage. Medium vehicles sit in between these types. Weapons are divided into melee (contact and ramming), short-range, medium-range and long-range, but some do not belong to these categories (like landmine and trap layers). Some weapons and hardware are entirely fictional, and some are real designs, modified to survive in combat. For example, the Jawbreaker cabin is the cabin from a BAE SEP APC, and structural parts and wheels from this vehicle are also available; the Whirlwind autocannon is a Bushmaster cannon in a Mk 38 mount. Other notable vehicles appearing in the game (usually in a form of a cabin and sometimes fitting armor parts) include Ford F-150 (7th gen), GAZelle, MAZ-7310, Volkswagen Type 2, etc. The weapons are often based on Soviet, American and European equipment.

The players can build a custom vehicle fitting their playstyle, with any weapons on any chassis, and tweak and upgrade it as they test it in battles and obtain better equipment. Blueprints allow to save vehicles for later use, and some example blueprints are provided by factions. Each faction will usually cater towards a particular vehicle archetype and playstyle, but the player is free to combine hardware form all factions in their designs.

Some parts have perks - special abilities that grant a passive, event-activated or player-activated bonus (for example, a cabin can provide bonus power when receiving damage, a weapon can deal more damage if at least 2 enemies are nearby, etc.) Creating a synergy of perks is important to create an efficient vehicle. Some cabins or modules will have perks that are favourable for a particular playstyle or weapon.

Vehicles have a PS (Powerscore) stat which is a sum of the Powerscore values of all of its parts. More advanced parts have generally higher PS, and higher PS vehicles will encounter more difficult enemies in most modes. High-PS vehicles also can earn more expensive resources in battles.

Progression involves obtaining better equipment, which can be done in multiple ways:

- Buying equipment in store or on the market.
- Crafting equipment using earned resources.
- Obtaining equipment as a reward for leveling up standing with factions and achieving Battle Pass levels.

Battles reward players with experience points, which count towards their faction progress and resources, which can be used for crafting or sold. Additional rewards are earned by completing regular quests.

The Market is an in-game platform for item exchange between players. Anyone can put a buy or sell order for hardware or resources, and other players can buy or sell according to these orders or put their own orders. Therefore, the prices are affected by player actions, though there is a limit on prices ("corridor") that prevents players from setting outstandingly high or low prices. These are adjusted dynamically. Prices can fluctuate due to in-game events, like on a real stock market, and players can even try to earn a profit on these fluctuations. Coins or Gold is the in-game currency used on the Market. It can also be bought as microtransactions and earned during events. When player sells a part, they receive an amount of coins the buyer spent minus market tax.

=== Game modes ===
The game offers several multiplayer modes across three categories:

PvP (8v8): Three team-based modes — Assault (capture enemy base), Domination (control 2 of 3 bases), and Encounter (fight over a single central base) — where teams win by eliminating opponents or completing the objective.

PvE Raids (4 players): Co-op missions where players fight AI enemies and bosses to complete objectives, requiring a daily resource called Fuel to participate.

Adventure/Awakening (1–4 players): A story campaign where an amnesiac protagonist works with factions to uncover their past. Functions as both a narrative mode and open sandbox with side missions and free roam, with enemy difficulty scaling to player strength.

Player Brawls (scheduled): Six recurring modes including a 32-player Battle Royale, a casual 16-player free-for-all (Bedlam), a one-shot railgun arena (Big Bad Scorpions), a smaller storm-circle survival (Storm Warning), and a weapons-free Race mode. Additional brawls appear during limited events. All modes reward resources used for crafting or trading.

== Development ==
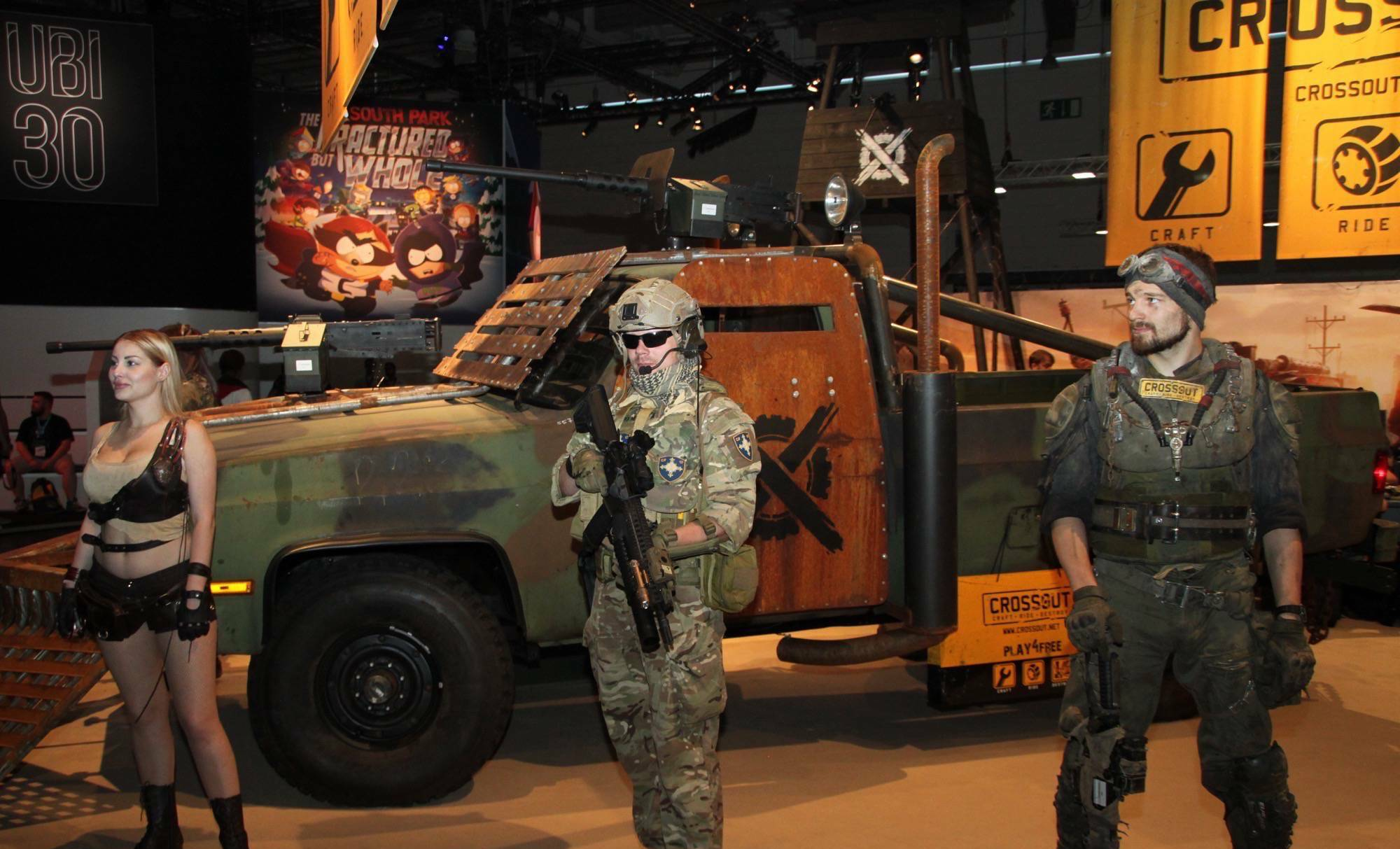
Promotion at Gamescom 2016

Gaijin Entertainment and Targem Games announced the development of a new free-to-play MMO set in a post-apocalyptic future. The first alpha tests of the game, called 'Battle Test', were launched in summer 2015 and in the same year, the game made its debut on the E3 2015. Later in the same year, the game was playable in a closed area at Gaijin Entertainment's booth at Gamescom 2015, where players got a promo code to participate in further testing. Crossout went into closed beta in April 2016 and was launched into open beta on May 30, 2017, on PC, PlayStation 4 and Xbox One. Crossout Mobile was launched on the Apple App Store on February 10, 2022, six days after the Google Play Store launch.

== See also ==
- Autoduel
