= Tactical Legends =

- Developer(s): Vera Gaming
- Engine: Unreal Engine 4
- Platform(s): Microsoft Windows
- Genre(s): Turn-based tactics, Turn-based strategy
- Mode(s): Single-player, Multiplayer

Tactical Legends is an upcoming turn-based tactics video game for Microsoft Windows. The game has been through the Steam greenlight process, and was released in December 2016. An online version, as well as versions for macOS, Linux, Xbox, PlayStation 4, iOS and Android, are currently planned. The game is currently available to download from the developer's website.

== Development ==
Vera gaming was not a game developer when it opened in 2010, instead developing and optimizing software for different industrial enterprises. The studio is made up of a small team of five programmers and designers that serve local industrial companies. The collective of the studio, consisting of hardcore gamers, had the idea of creating a video game for a number of years. In July 2015, after the Unreal Engine became free, the team began to develop Tactical Legends. The game was later submitted to the Steam Greenlight program.

== Units ==
A unit refers to the various characters in the game.

- The King is a ranged unit with short attack distance, low action points, a low attack rate, and low health. However, the king is equipped with heavy armor as well as the benefit of attacking twice in the same turn. The King is a critical unit, killing the opponents king wins the match.
- The swordsman is a melee unit with high health points and medium armor.
- The archer is a ranged unit with a high range and high mobility, resulting in the ability to cross large swaths of the battlefield in one movement if they have not previously used that turn. Archers are light units who wear no armor and have low health points.
- The healer has no attack, low health points, no armor, and only moderate mobility, but possesses a limited range healing ability, and can add health to friendly units even if the units health is at its maximum.
- Assassins are very mobile, ranged units. They have low health points and no armor, but the assassins can poison their targets, sapping their health.

== Maps ==
A map describes a region where the game is taking place at.

- Blizzard Passage. "Spark River is a natural border between two kingdoms now at war. In summer, due to the fresh air, redolence of coniferous forest, and the swift sound of the river, people flock to its shores alone and in company. Eventually summer's wrath fades. Soon the flowers wilt and the leaves fall, dead. Winter asserts its rule with ferocious snowstorms. Frost binds the river with sturdy ice; this place becomes an ideal crossing for the hostile armies."
- Ruins. "Long before these ruins were abandoned to the mercy of time and nature, they were the foundations of a great city bordering two states. The symbol of pride for one and envy for the other, controlling the city became the spark that started the bloody war that rages to this day. These ruins stand as a reminder to both peoples that even the invincible, the pious, the confident, and the unique are subject to death and destruction. As time flows, and generations pass, people inevitably forget these cruel lessons, despite the lasting impacts before their eyes. Now these ruins of a once great city serve the sole purpose of harboring battles. For it is only among the dead and dying, pooling in blood on the stone foundations, and creeping in the shadows among charred walls, that the forgotten past is remembered."
- Forest shack. "The forest of Aira is endless, magnificent, and mysterious. Sunlight trickles through the saturated tree tops and creates an inexpressible beauty out of the battle between light and shadow. Myriads of birds sing in unison, taking the human consciousness far away from this world. Like the sirens’ song, this intoxicating aura often bodes ill. It is easy to lose one's place among the shifting trees and whispering leaves. Travelers should keep their swords close, lest they fall victim to the untold beasts that are rumored to roam the fairy forest."
