= Onigiri (video game) =

2013 video game and anime series

- PAL digital cover
- Genre: Fantasy
- Video game
- Developer: CyberStep
- Publisher: CyberStep
- Genre: Action MMORPG
- Platform: Microsoft Windows, PlayStation 4, Xbox One, PlayStation Vita, Nintendo Switch
- Released: Microsoft Windows: JP: February 6, 2014; NA: July 1, 2014; PlayStation 4: JP: February 22, 2014; NA: October 6, 2015; Xbox One: JP: November 27, 2014; NA: October 2, 2015; PAL: April 13, 2017; PlayStation Vita: JP: July 21, 2017; Nintendo Switch: WW: January 30, 2019; JP: January 31, 2019
- Anime television series
- Directed by: Takashi Yamamoto
- Written by: Takamitsu Kōno
- Music by: Yutaka Yamada; Izumi Mori
- Studio: Pierrot+
- Licensed by: NA: Sentai Filmworks
- Original network: Tokyo MX, BS Fuji
- English network: US: Anime Network
- Original run: April 7, 2016 – June 30, 2016
- Episodes: 13

Onigiri (鬼斬; lit. Demon Cutter) is an action massively multiplayer online role-playing game (MMORPG) developed and published by CyberStep. It is set in a fantasy land reminiscent of ancient Japan in which humans and non-humans such as oni and other yōkai coexist. The game was originally released in Japan on February 6, 2014 and in North America on July 1, 2014. The English console versions were released on October 2, 2015 for the Xbox One, on October 6, 2015 for the PlayStation 4 and January 31, 2019, for Nintendo Switch. The game's title means "oni cutter", reflective of the player character's background as an oni; the title can also be taken as a pun on onigiri, the Japanese rice ball. As of July 31, 2020, the Xbox servers were shut down and the game was removed for purchase from the Xbox store. On September 26, 2022, Nintendo Switch servers were also shut down, but Onigiri still remains playable on PlayStation Network and Steam.

== Plot ==
The game is set in a fantasy version of ancient Japan that is filled with creatures of myth. Ages ago, the terrible Kamikui made a trail of death and destruction across the land before being stopped by the goddess of the Sun, Amaterasu Oomikami. The goddess had placed three great Seals that forced Kamikui to retreat, but one of the Seals has now been shattered.

The player character is an Oni whose peaceful life in the Western island of Onigashima is disturbed by the revival of the Kamikui.

== Gameplay ==
The game has different servers for the PC, Xbox One, Nintendo Switch, and PS4 versions but the gameplay is the same for all versions.

Unlike most other MMORPGs, which have different races or classes, in Onigiri, players can only play as Oni and choosing a class simply requires the player to pick a favored weapon to specialize in. When creating a character, players choose one of five traits that will determine which weapons they can use. The traits are Power (Axe, Oodachi, Spear, or Sword), Defensive (Spear or Staff), Kind (Staff or Wand), Daring (Axe, Oodachi, Dual Swords, Bow, or Sword), and Cautious (Dual Swords, Bow, or Wand). Characters level up five basic stats: Power, Vitality, Wisdom, Mind, and Dexterity.

=== Partner System ===
In Onigiri, players have eight NPC partners, who have distinct personalities and abilities; these can be improved as they gain more affection for the player. Affection levels can be raised by giving the companions gifts that they prefer.

== Characters ==
=== Main characters ===
- Shizuka Gozen (静御前, Shizuka-gozen)

Voiced by: Aina Suzuki (Japanese); Cynthia Martinez (English)
A princess of the shogunate who has a large mansion in Edo. She runs away from home because of the strict discipline that she has had to undergo as a princess since she was little. She uses a bow and arrows as her weapon.

- Yoshitsune (義経, Yoshitsune)

Voiced by: Eriko Matsui (Japanese); Stephanie Wittels (English)
A girl who is strict to others, but even stricter to herself. Usually a person with common sense, she becomes irrational on matters involving Shizuka Gozen, a relative of hers and the one exception to her otherwise all-encompassing disciplinary traits (as Yoshitsune does like to spoil Shizuka Gozen). Yoshitsune was tasked by Bakufu with the responsibility of suppressing evil spirits. She acts cute when drunk, which Kijimuna points out is even cuter than Veronica. She uses a katana as her weapon.

- Ibaraki Doji (茨木童子, Ibaraki-dōji)

Voiced by: Suzuko Mimori (Japanese); Brittney Karbowski (English)
The daughter of the Oni who runs the Nagare tavern. She drinks sake three times as much as she eats rice, with her favourite sake being matatabi. She has a cheerful personality, and loves to do foolish things with her friends. Even though she runs a bar, she is always drunk (as pointed out by Shizuka Gozen). Her weapon of choice is a sword in the shape of a cat's paw.

- Kaguya (かぐや, Kaguya)

Voiced by: Izumi Kitta (Japanese); Kira Vincent-Davis (English)
An enigmatic girl whose deeds, words, thoughts, and origins are unknown to those around her. Her hobbies include surfing the internet and reading "large-electron tile block print" (electronic newspapers). In her free time, she can be found posting fresh threads on the internet or trolling. She wears an eyepatch, and suffers from chunibyo.

- Amaterasu (あまてらす, Amaterasu)

Voiced by: Natsuko Hara (Japanese); Hilary Haag (English)
Formerly the sun goddess who sealed Kamikui in the past, Amaterasu Oomikami herself, Amaterasu was turned into a little girl when a large barrier got destroyed a few years ago. She likes that she can conduct herself well in her little girl form.

=== Secondary characters ===
- Veronica Vasilyevna Vonitsky (ヴェロニカ・ワシーリエヴナ・ヴォイニーツカヤ, Veronika Vashīrievuna Voinītsukaya)

Voiced by: Yuki Nakashima (Japanese); Margaret McDonald (English)
A boy who used the power of Kamikui to take on the appearance of a girl in order to take part in "Her Party", becoming the so-called "male daughter". His physical prowess is limited, but he has a high intellect, being a genius scientist. He always tries to stop Shizuka Gozen's partying with his dubious inventions. His name is always read in full. He hates anyone who is cuter than he is. His affection towards Susanoo (which becomes apparent during Kaga missions) implies that he is a homosexual crossdresser.

- Uzume (うずめ, Uzume)

Voiced by: Monya Nakane (Japanese); Joanne Bonasso (English)
"Her Party"'s symbolic goddess, who is, in actuality, a real goddess, Ame-no-Uzume-no-Mikoto. Although she is a good-hearted goddess with twisted personality, she hates the unnatural existence of Veronica Vasilyevna Vonitsky as a "male daughter". Initially seeming to hate Shizuka Gozen, she falls in love with Shizuka after an incident where both of them get drunk.

- Kijimuna (キジムナー, Kijimuna)

Voiced by: Nozomi Kishita (Japanese); Tiffany Grant (English)
Seemingly a Yōkai who originally is a tree brimming with curiosity. For Kijimuna, it is lethal to not say Veronica Vasilyevna Vonitsky's name properly. Alongside Uzume and Veronica, Kijimuna is secretly on a journey to get the shogun's hidden treasure. He has a habit of saying "muna" at the end of its sentence. A running gag revolves around Kijimuna giving experience and coins upon dying, which is taken advantage of by the other characters.

- Jin (ジン, Jin), stylized as Zin in the anime

The only male in Shizuka Gozen's party, he is with Sakura when they get separated. Since Onigiri only has female voices, his dialogue is always written ADV-style, like in visual novels.

- Sakura (さくら, Sakura)

Voiced by: Suzuko Mimori (Japanese); Chaney Moore (English)
The descendant of an Oni who once lived in Onigashima, but is now separated from this world. Since Onigashima is now crowded due to being a popular tourist destination, Sakura lives her daily life just by training herself. Along with fellow Oni descendants Jin and Shizuka Gozen, she travels to destroy the Kamikuis.

=== Other characters ===
- Narrator

Voiced by: Katsuyuki Konishi (Japanese); Jay Hickman (English)
The narrator of the story, who provides the background story of each episode, and mostly acts as the straight man to Shizuka Gozen's party.

- System Representative (システム代理, System Dairi)

Voiced by: Tiffany Terrell (English)

- Gako (ガアコ, Gaako)

Voiced by: Juliet Simmons (English)
A Kamikui who turned into a human with memory loss. She remembers her past later on.

- Gagomi (ガゴ美, Gagomi)

Voiced by: Shanae'a Moore (English)

- Sweet Shop Girl (ひろ子, Hiroko)

Voiced by: Carolyn Medrano (English)

- Shako KAMIE (神笑社子, Shako KAMIE)
- Girl from a different World (異世界の少女, Isekai no Shoujo)
- Ariko (ありこ, Ariko)

Voiced by: Rachel Landon (English)

- Souryu Battleship (双竜戦艦, Souryuu Senkan)
- Satan (サタン, Satan)
- Mephistopheles (メフィストフェレス, Mefīsuto Fēresu)

Voiced by: Heather Spiller (English)

- Lucifer (ルシファー, Rushifā)
- Miroku

Uses a spear. Appears only in the game and related promotional materials.

- Momotarou

Uses a pair of katana. He is often hungry. Appears only in the game and related promotional materials.

- Susanoo

Amaterasu's brother. Uses a large sword shaped like flames. Appears only in the game and related promotional materials.

== Reception ==
Onigiri has garnered a number of favorable reviews. Bradly Storm of Hardcore Gamer felt that it was "a fairly competent and enjoyable hack-and-slash experience" even though the launch suffered from server-side latency issues. Reviewer Angelique Stokes praised the game's combat and wrote that the game was "bursting with personality." Sheattack's Charnelle Schindel found the plot "lackluster" but overall she felt Onigiri was generally "great fun to play." Crunchyroll called it "a very solid title."

On the other hand, many players have criticized the game for its monotony after reaching a certain level. The game creators have tried to address it by adding more high level content, event exclusive items, as well as collaboration events with other Intellectual Properties. Recently, the English PC server has raised the player level cap to level 135. No players have reached the new cap yet (as of January 2018).

== Other media ==
=== Anime ===
An anime television adaptation of the game was announced by CyberStep on January 27, 2016. It aired from April 7, 2016 on Tokyo MX and BS Fuji then finished on June 30, 2016. Pierrot+ produced the anime with Takashi Yamamoto directing the series, Takamitsu Kouno handling series composition, Takashi Aoshima and Atsushi Oka writing the scripts. Yukiko Ibe designed the characters and is the series' chief animation director.

Sentai Filmworks has licensed the series for North America.

The opening theme is "Hime wa Rankiryuu☆Goikkou-sama" (姫は乱気流☆御一行様, The Princess is Turbulence☆Her Party) by STARMARIE.

==== Episode list ====
No.	Title	Original release date
1	"The Curtain Raises on Onigiri" "Onikiri kaimaku" (鬼斬開幕)	April 7, 2016
While arguing about who will deliver the final blow, Shizuka Gozen and party get attacked and are scattered. Yoshitsune and Shizuka arrives at Satsuma, where they fight a group of Kamikuis. While eradicating Kamikui, Shizuka attempts on using secret weapon, which is detected as a faulty tool, which makes their account suspended for a week.
2	"Pandora's Box!" "Mōryōbakko" (魍魎跋扈)	April 14, 2016
Shizuka Gozen and Yoshitsune arrives at Chikuho, where they meet Ibaraki Douji. They end up helping a girl on making Pi-yoko by hunting Kamikui. Ibaraki's attempt on using a secret weapon once again resulted in their account suspended for another week.
3	"Burning Hakata" "Hakata enjō" (博多炎上)	April 21, 2016
Master Kamikui Mephistopheles appears, and is heading towards Hakata. Amaterasu tries to fend it off alone, while Shizuka, Yoshitsune and Ibaraki are enjoying themselves somewhere. It turns out Mephistopheles is just a maiden insecure about her height (1,870 meters). Out of jealousy, Mephistopheles attacks Kannaru City Hakata, a popular spot for dates.
4	"Behind the Scenes" "Anchūhiyaku" (暗中飛躍)	April 28, 2016
Shizuka Gozen, Yoshitsune and Ibaraki arrives at Nagato, where Shizuka and Yoshitsune gets poisoned by eating blowfish. In Akiyoshi cave, Uzume, Veronica Vasilyevna Voynitsky and Kijimuna introduce themselves, before succumb into the same blowfish poison.
5	"Marital Vows" "Hiyokurenri" (比翼連理)	May 5, 2016
Separated from Shizuka and others, Sakura and Jin fight the Kamikuis at Oki. Sakura then reminisce on the romantic comedy story of how she and Jin met and start hunting Kamikui, in which the narrator points out it has nothing to do with Kamikui at all. Shizuka Gozen at Yoshitsune pray so that they will meet Sakura and Jin soon.
6	"Lottery First Prize" "Ichiban tomikuji" (一番富籤)	May 12, 2016
Shizuka Gozen, Yoshitsune and Ibaraki goes to Tottori to look for Kaguya, who is still trying to hit the lottery for a rare prize from a 10-times rare prize campaign. Shizuka wants to do the lottery to, and pulls out a Super Rare Special Lorelei's Holy Staff on the first try, to Kaguya's dismay. She throws it away a few seconds later due to a misunderstanding, which sparks a new story, Legend of the Holy Girl Who Conquered the Devils (not related to Onigiri at all). Kaguya tries the lottery many times, but gets Creepy Lucky Charms each time.
7	"Dreaming a Life Away" "Suiseimushi" (酔生夢死)	May 19, 2016
Shizuka Gozen and party arrives at Onigashima to fight Satan, who is not there at all, so they spend their time drinking in Ibaraki's stall, alongside Uzume, Kijimuna and Veronica. Being drunk, love sparks between Uzume and Shizuka.
8	"A Transient Dream" "Utakata no yume" (泡沫之夢)	May 26, 2016
While fighting Mud Boat Tanuki, Shizuka Gozen and party got cursed, and they turn into Super Deformed characters. At Tosa, they meet Shako Kamie, a producer of God Smile Company, who scouts them to become idol unit named Onigiri5. 2 years later, they perform a concert at Ten Teratron, where they sing Hime wa Rankiryuu☆Goikkou-sama.
9	"The Pain of Separation" "Aibetsuriku" (愛別離苦)	June 2, 2016
Two gargoyle sisters Gako and Gagomi lives happily at Mountain of Shikoku, before they are attacked by a group of Kamikui killers. In an attempt to save her elder sister, Gagomi sacrifices herself as she push Gako into the river. Shizuka Gozen and party found Gako in Yoshino River and saves her, though she suffers amnesia. When she eats udon given by Ibaraki, tears run down her cheek, though she is yet to know why.
10	"Illusions of Dreams" "Mugenhōyō" (夢幻泡影)	June 9, 2016
At Setsu, Shizuka and Gako acts like sisters, as Yoshitsune and Uzume engulf in jealousy. Shizuka and Gako collect stamps together to have a luxury dinner, as Gako gets Déjà vu more and more. After being attacked by a Kamikui brought by Uzume (which Shizuka effortlessly kill), Gako gets her memory back, as she introduces herself as Gako the Gargoyle, a Kamikui, and instantly harbor negative feelings for Shizuka, since she is a human, and her sister was killed by a human.
11	"Battle of the Strongest" "Ryūtōkosō" (竜闘虎争)	June 16, 2016
Shizuka Gozen fights Gako in order to remind her that she is her friend, and tells her that human and Kamikui can coexist. Their fight is interrupted when a super massive Kamikui from outer space appears. Hearing that it would destroy Sanuki, Gako decides to fight the Kamikui to protect her memories with her sister, despite both of them being Kamikuis. Shizuka and party helps her, and in order to destroy the massive Kamikui, Gako uses all of her energy, sacrificing herself. In the epilogue, it is shown Gako in a white one-piece dress alongside her sister standing at a wheat field, smiling.
12	"In High Spirits" "Kienbanjō" (気焔万丈)	June 23, 2016
Shizuka Gozen and party fights (Mecha) Mephistopheles, who wreaks havoc at Kyoto, with a Super Armor Human-form Robot, Benkei, which runs on mysterious energy called "SA-Kg Energy" (which actually just artists drawing the animation frame, portrayed by Onigiri characters Momotarou, Susanoo and Miroku).
13	"Onigiri Final" "Onikiri heimaku" (鬼斬閉幕)	June 30, 2016
Shizuka Gozen and party are asked to reflect on themselves by System Representative (システム代表 Shisutemu Daihyō), while playing penalty game. Uzume, Veronica and Kijimuna (now returns to her original form after her life count becomes 0) brings a lot of Kamikui and beat Jin and Sakura. Before they deliver the final blow, Sakura and party appears. Both sides are now begins to engage on a fight, as the story continues (not).
