= War Thunder =

2013 free-to-play video game

- Cover art for the PlayStation 4
- Developer: Gaijin Entertainment
- Publisher: Gaijin Entertainment
- Composers: Georgy Zheryakov; Alexander Chorni; Zahar Antonov; Jeremy Soule
- Platforms: Microsoft Windows; macOS; Linux; PlayStation 4; Xbox One; PlayStation 5; Xbox Series X/S
- Release: August 15, 2013: Windows; WW: August 15, 2013; PlayStation 4; EU: November 29, 2013; NA: June 3, 2014; OS X; WW: April 17, 2014; Linux; WW: November 6, 2014; Android; WW: June 2, 2015; Official release; WW: December 21, 2016; Xbox One; WW: June 19, 2018; PlayStation 5; WW: November 17, 2020
- Genres: Action, vehicular combat, combat flight simulator
- Modes: Single-player, multiplayer

War Thunder (Originally known as War Thunder: World of Planes) is a 2013 free-to-play vehicular combat multiplayer video game produced by Gaijin Entertainment for Microsoft Windows, macOS, Linux, PlayStation 4, Xbox One, PlayStation 5, Xbox Series X/S, Oculus, and Vive. It was first released in November 2012 as an open beta with a worldwide release in January 2013; it had its official release on December 21, 2016. A spinoff game called War Thunder Mobile (also known as War Thunder Edge) was released in 2023 for Android and iOS.

Developed as a "flying simulation game", it was previously named War Thunder: World of Planes, but due to its similarity with Wargaming's World of Warplanes, it was changed to its present name in 2012. Initially, Gaijin claimed after the game was announced that it was an April Fools joke before confirming its existence in June that same year.

War Thunder won several awards following its release, winning Best Simulation Game at the Gamescom 2013 Awards as well as winning Best Game, Best Developer, Best Technology and Best Sound at the KRI 2013 Awards. In 2019, War Thunder was among the most played games on Steam with over 25,000 concurrent players. (Note: These numbers do not include console players or PC players using the Gaijin.net service.) As of November 1, 2022, War Thunder had over 70 million registered players on all platforms combined, out of which 160,000 play concurrently. In February 2024, War Thunder set a new record of over 250,000 concurrent players.

== Gameplay ==
War Thunder developer stream

War Thunder is based around combined arms battles on air, land, and sea. Vehicles range from pre-World War I (ships only) to the modern day, as well as tanks that are not technically in service yet, with an emphasis on World War II, the Vietnam War, and the Cold War. Players can control aircraft, ground vehicles, and warships from nations with a set of technology trees attached to them. The game also incorporates other nations. These nations are included either as "sub-trees" (parts of the research trees of bigger nations being dedicated to a smaller nation) or premium vehicles, purchasable with real money or in-game currency. Players starts off at Rank 1 with vehicles mainly from the Interwar period and early World War II era and work their way up to Rank 8 vehicles which features fighting vehicles still in use by modern armies. Currently, there are no rules/barriers for bringing lower rank vehicles (eg. M22 Locust from Rank 1) to higher ranks such as Rank 8 and 9.

Vehicles are divided into three main categories: aviation, ground, and fleet, while game modes are divided between arcade, realistic, and simulator. Aviation is divided between regular aircraft and helicopters, fleet is divided between "Bluewater", ships from the size of destroyers to battlecruisers and battleships and "Coastal", smaller ships and boats such as motor torpedo boats, motor gunboats, submarine chasers, and frigates. A single-player mode that focuses on historical battles, and a co-op wave survival mode for battling AI ground vehicles and aircraft, are also available.

In War Thunder, the player takes control of a vehicle, depending on the type of battle. That player is in full control of their vehicle until it is destroyed by the enemy team. The objective of most battles is to accumulate points, either by destroying enemy vehicles or capturing strategic positions on the map.

=== Events ===
Events in War Thunder provide custom missions, usually based on one of the three main game modes, but with alternative settings regarding allowed vehicles, mission specifics, etc. Examples are the recreation of historical battles by restricting available vehicles (e.g., Battle of Britain). Traditionally, the developers prepare unconventional events for April Fools' Day. These events are used to test planned game mechanics before their broader release to the player base.

Examples include "March to Victory", introducing playable mecha composed of tank parts; "The Pony Nation", introducing the world of My Little Pony, Equestria, as a sixth playable faction (2013); "Gaijilla", featuring a battle against a giant Godzilla-like snail (2014); and Atomic Thunder, featuring vehicles from the video game Atomic Heart (July 2023).

In August 2020, the game had a tank biathlon-style event featuring select Russian and Chinese tanks performing tasks on a tank range map, with the objective to finish in 1st place after navigating obstacles and destroying targets. The event was partnered with the Information Systems Department of the Russian Ministry of Defense. Logos advertising the game also appeared during the event, notably painted on the side of the tanks during the real biathlon. The event was teased on August 17 with a YouTube video posted to the game's official YouTube Channel, as well as on the official website.

== Mobile ==
War Thunder Mobile

War Thunder Mobile (formerly known as War Thunder Edge) is a mobile version of War Thunder produced by Gaijin Entertainment and publicly released on August 15, 2023.

The game consists of three modes: Ground, Air, and Naval, with vehicles ranging from the Second World War to contemporary vehicles. Similar to the main game, there is a tech tree system. Players are able to create a line-up in the Aviation and Ground modes, mixing different nations between different types of vehicles. As of October 2025, there is no way to mix the different game modes, but the player is able to spawn bombers and fighters depending on their score in the battle. War Thunder Mobile features ground vehicle trees for the United States, Soviet Union, Germany, China, and Japan, as well as some miscellaneous vehicles from Italy, Sweden, France, and the United Kingdom, along with a few vehicles from other countries; ships from the USA, UK, Germany, USSR, Japan, and few ships from other countries; and planes from the USA, Germany, USSR, and UK, along with a few planes from other countries.

=== Trophies ===
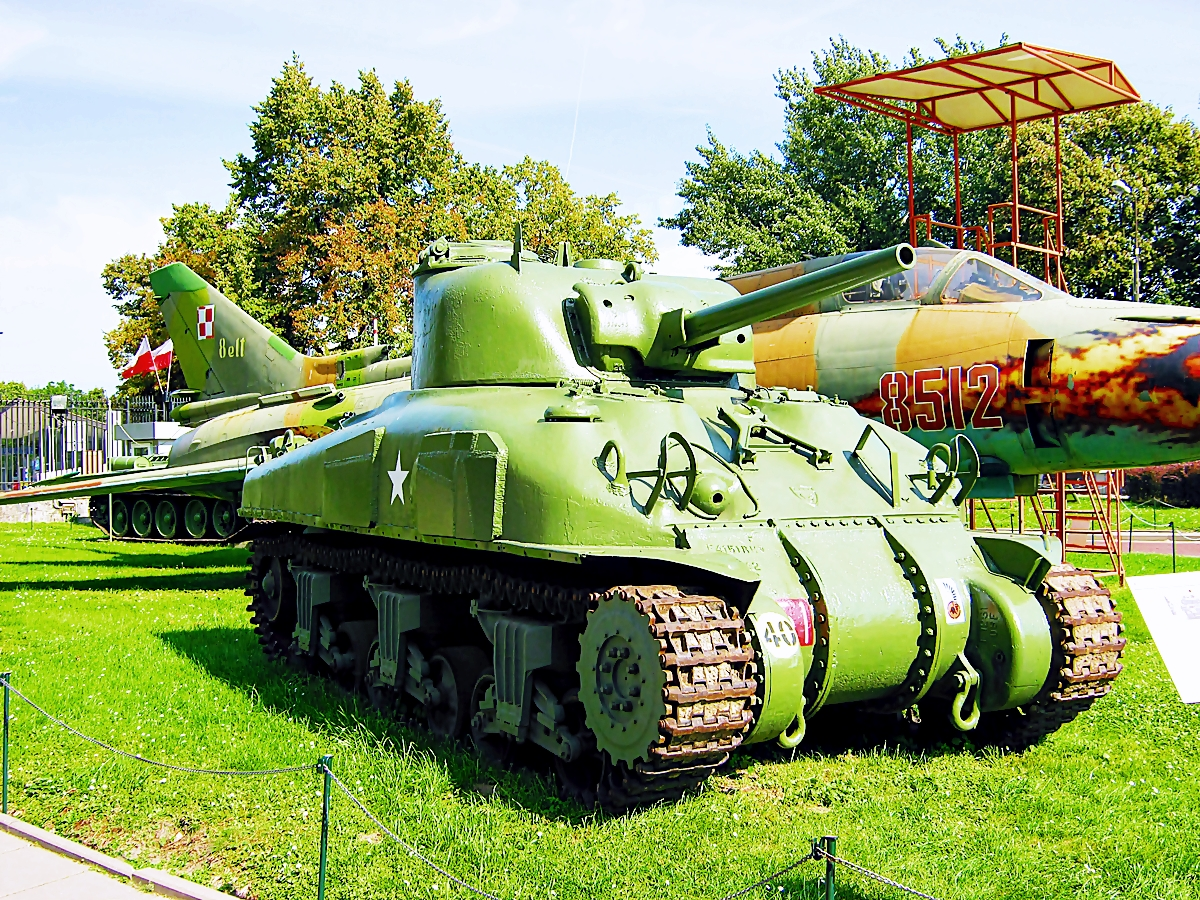
The M4A1 is one of the 4 optional tanks that one can start out with in WT Mobile.

A gacha system to unlock vehicles for the 3 modes is updated per month with the updates. If a player missed the reward for former updates, another gacha to unlock former rewards runs for 7 days, after the end of the leaderboard. There is always a big trophy (containing premium versions of the two top-tier vehicles in the medium trophy, and used to contain a higher-rank platoon or vehicle), and a medium trophy (used to contain a lower- to mid-rank platoon, currently contains common rarity versions of the 2 top-tier vehicles). Other rewards are obtainable as well through the gacha system in the trophies, including supplies, in-game currency, and more "warbonds," which are used to open the medium and big trophies.

=== Updates ===
War Thunder Mobile began as an Open Beta test on 27 March 2023. The first major update for the beta was the called "Symphony of Fire", adding a new map, new vehicles and options to customize the user interface.

The final update of the Beta test was the "Warzone Alliance," adding the option to play in a squad with your friends and a crew system that was easy to understand, as well as more vehicles being added to Ground and Naval.

On August 15, 2023, the game was launched globally, and players could receive special vehicles in the first week of playing, those being a French M4A4 medium tank and the USS Nicholas.

During the following years after the game's release, most of the updates only added new vehicles and customization items, with new maps being rarely added into the game. However, the "Stalingrad Map" was added to the game for the Christmas Celebration and New Year Event.

=== Seasons ===
War Thunder Mobile has gone through many different "seasons," which are events/updates that last for 30 days and bring combinations of new missions, vehicles, maps, aesthetics, user interface changes, game modes, and rewards. There have always been at least two new vehicles for each game mode (in prior years there were 2 different platoons of 4 vehicles for the ground mode, but this has changed after the "Tanks 2.0" update), and new missions and rewards.

There may be "mini-seasons" within the main 30-day seasons that contain different rewards, missions, and often new vehicles along with recurring vehicles from the previous run of the mini-season. These mini-seasons are often around holidays like Christmas, Halloween, Lunar New Year, and Valentine's Day, and may bring a holiday-themed event game mode. There may be multiple mini-seasons within the main season.

== History ==
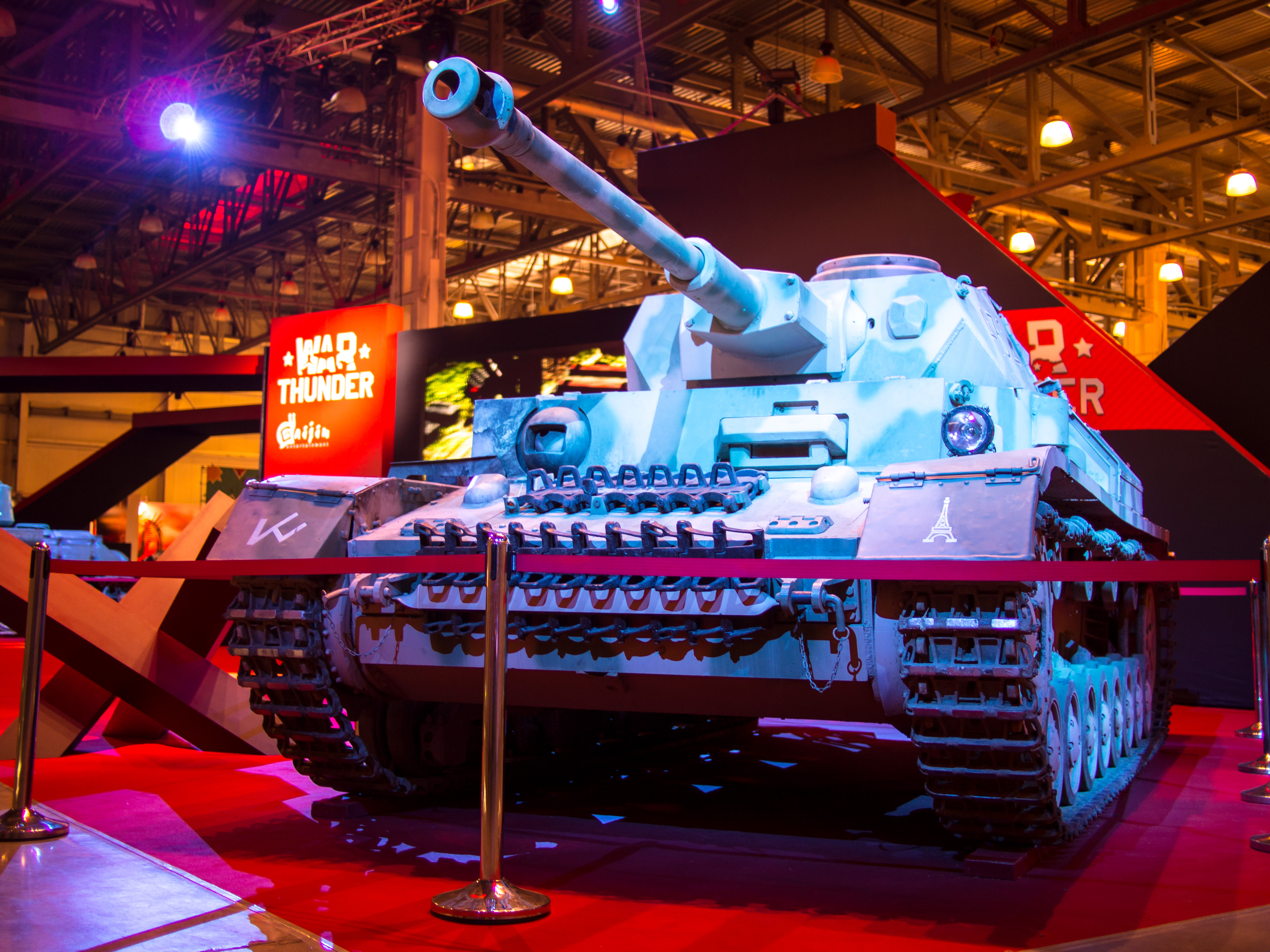
War Thunder at IgroMir 2013

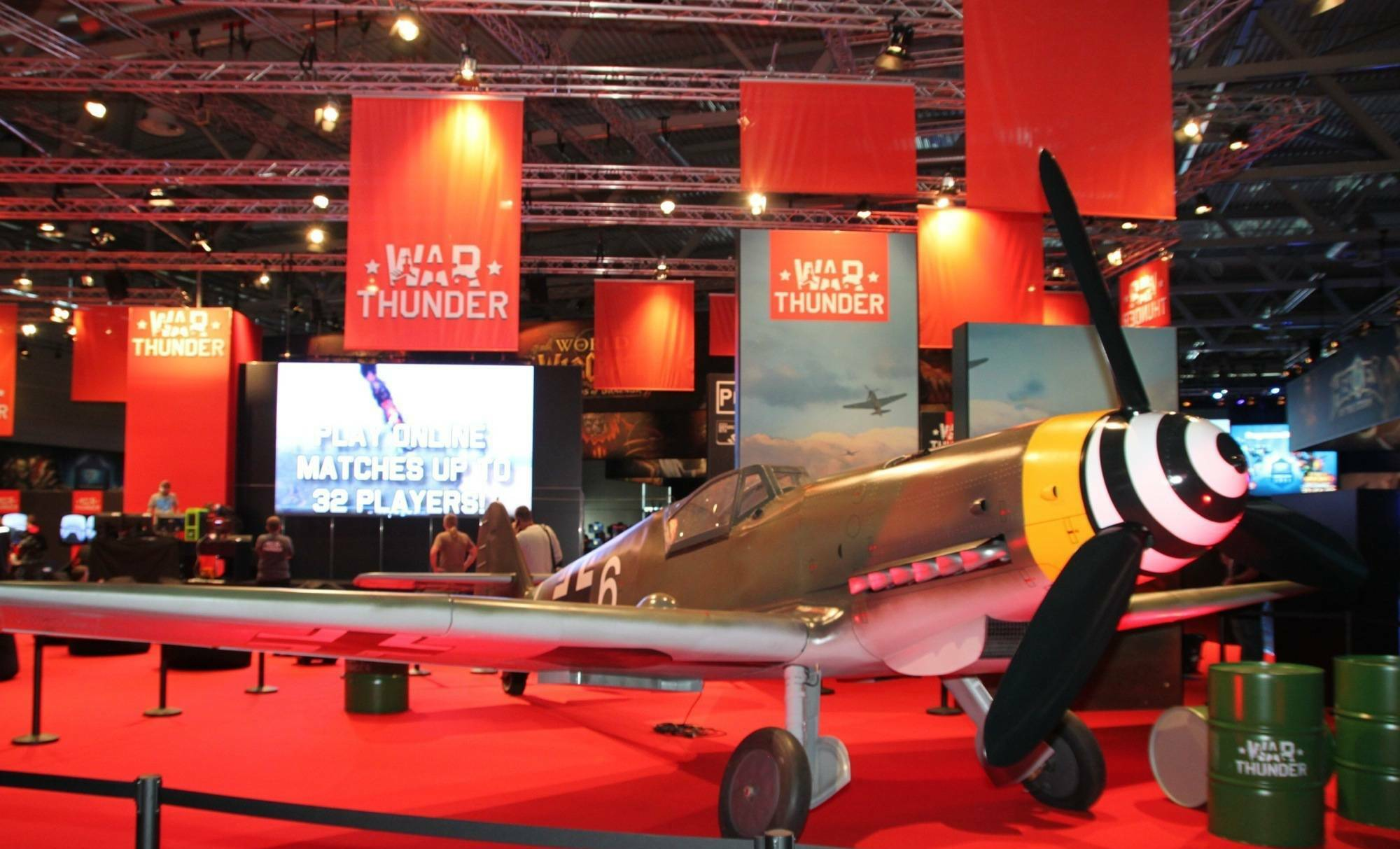
War Thunder at Gamescom 2014

=== Early development and closed beta ===
The development of the game, then under the name World of Planes, began in 2009. Gaijin Entertainment used its experience with its previous combat flight simulator games, such as IL-2 Sturmovik: Birds of Prey, Apache: Air Assault, and Birds of Steel, in the development. The title was changed to War Thunder during the closed beta due to confusion with competitor World of Warplanes.

=== Open beta and release ===
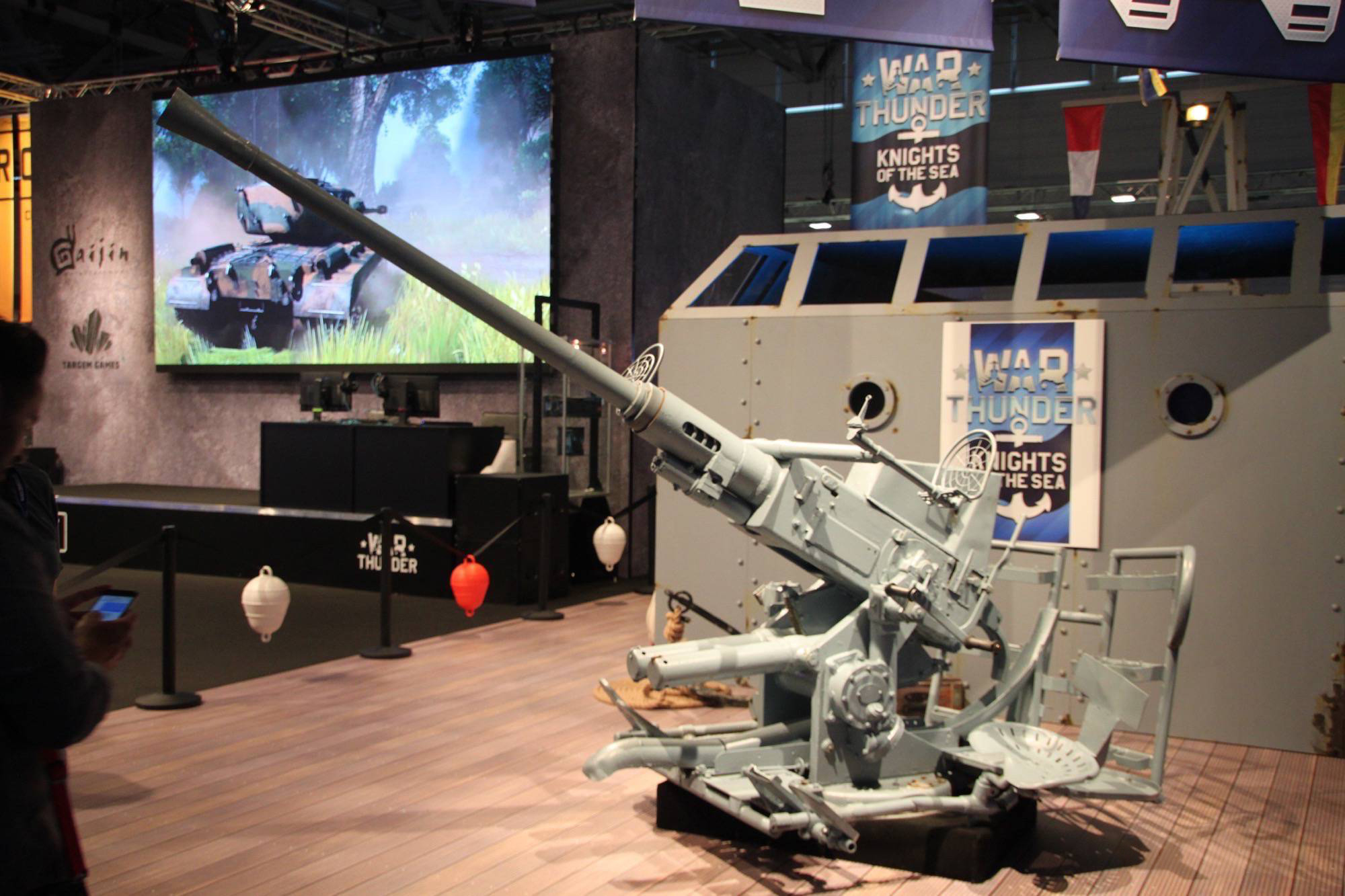
Promotion of War Thunder: Knights of the Sea at Gamescom 2016

Open beta testing started on November 1, 2012 (for users from the Russian Federation; the global beta launched January 28, 2013) for Windows PC with about 200 aircraft and 600,000 players. On May 15, 2014, at 6 million registered players, the first ground forces for Germany and the Soviet Union were introduced. Later added were the American, British, and Japanese ground forces.

In 2017, Italy was added as a playable faction. At Gamescom 2018, the planned addition of helicopters into the game was announced, and by late 2018, helicopters were fully implemented.

In 2022, Tencent announced that the Chinese version of the game published by Tencent would be discontinued on October 17.

== Controversies ==
=== Accusations of supporting an anti-Ukrainian YouTube channel ===
In January 2021, after the logos of War Thunder were seen in a video by pro-separatist YouTube channel "High Caliber Mayhem", Gaijin was accused of indirectly financing Russian-backed separatist forces in the war in Donbas. High Caliber Mayhem has denied any links to the separatist forces and published an explanation claiming that all the money from all advertisements on that channel were spent on humanitarian aid for civilians. The video showing the War Thunder advertisement was removed from High Caliber Mayhem's YouTube channel.

In response to the controversy, Gaijin stated "We do not provide political support to anyone anywhere. We know nothing about politics and prefer to stay out of it. Our agency that ordered an ad in the video in question took it down when they realized they might drag us into a political discussion."

=== Review bombing ===
Following an in-game economic change in May 2023 which drastically reduced rewards given for battle actions and an increase in post-battle costs, a large amount of War Thunder players began revolting against the developers by review bombing the game on multiple platforms, such as Steam and Google. In response, Gaijin has since reverted the planned economic change, posted statements regarding the issue and player progression, announced a revision of the economy for mid-summer 2023 and issued an apology for the initial controversial changes.

=== Military training tool ===
In 2020, Task & Purpose reported that the US 1st Cavalry Division tankers were using War Thunder for training during COVID-19 quarantine. After looking at several games including World of Tanks, the soldiers found that War Thunder best met their needs. In 2021, a video of the Republic of Korea's 3rd Armored Brigade using War Thunder for the Command & Control training session was made public.

In January 2024, a Ukrainian M2 Bradley IFV gunner of the 47th Brigade, referred to only as Serhiy, disabled a Russian T-90M main battle tank by shooting specific areas of the tank's armor, claiming that video games taught him exactly where to shoot. According to media, War Thunder is the only game that matches this description. Task & Purpose said: "People know War Thunder for leaking classified documents, but now it might actually be known as the game that has the first confirmed kill."

In May 2025, a drone operator serving in the Armed Forces of Ukraine from New Zealand, referred to as Cass, destroyed a T-72 tank in a weak spot he knew from his game experience, as "the modelling of tank armour" in War Thunder "is quite realistic".

=== Sensitive document leaks ===
On several occasions, users of the War Thunder forum have shared restricted and/or classified documents during discussions about the accuracy of the vehicles depicted. In all cases, offending posts are removed by the moderators, and users are warned against sharing such documents. Anton Yudintsev, founder of Gaijin Entertainment, has stated that the development team is never exposed to the contents, reminding users that "it's both illegal and pointless, so they should never do that". Gaijin's policy regarding technical information is

IN BRIEF: You are prohibited from publishing any Classified information, Export-restricted military-technical data, or other defense-related information...

— Gaijin, Gaijin Community Guidelines: Military Restrictions

Although users disclose non-public information to win an argument or persuade Gaijin to make changes to War Thunder vehicles, doing so prevents the company from implementing such changes. In January 2023, Raytheon denied media reports that security clearance background checks for jobs at the defense contractor investigate whether applicants play War Thunder.

Gaijin often jokes about the phenomena. Notably in the "No sekrit dokuments, please." decal which is a parody of the "No!" (Russian: "Нет!") poster, a 1954 Soviet anti-alcohol poster.

| Date | Vehicle | Restriction level | Topic of interest | Description |
|---|---|---|---|---|
| July 14, 2021 | Challenger 2 tank | Classified | In-game modelling | A forum member claiming to be a Challenger 2 tank commander posted images of classified documents pertaining to the tank on the official War Thunder forums. The documents, which contained information about the armor structure of the vehicle, were edited to make them appear declassified under the UK Freedom of Information Act. The post was taken down because the UK Ministry of Defence had previously told Gaijin Entertainment that the documents were classified, so moderators knew about their status by the time of the leak. The user was given an official warning by forum officials, and the post was removed. |
| October 2021 | Leclerc tank | Uncertain | Turret rotation speed | A user leaked classified documents of the Leclerc to win an argument about turret rotation speed. Gaijin forum moderators removed the material within hours, repeating their strict policy against posting restricted documents. |
| June 2022 | ZTZ-99 tank | Classified | Tungsten penetrator | A user posted an image of a Chinese DTC10-125 tungsten penetrator on the War Thunder forums, sitting atop a document outlining the projectile's specifications. Similar to previous instances, the post was quickly removed by forum moderators, with them citing the fact that the materials in question are classified in China. |
| Late 2022 | UHT-665 Eurocopter Tiger helicopter | Export restricted | Armour layout | A forum member posted parts of the armour layout of the UHT-665 Eurocopter Tiger, which is still in service. The user was banned and the content was swiftly removed. |
| January 16, 2023 | F-16 fighter jet | Export restricted (Note: Formerly classified, but has since expired) | AIM-120 air-to-air missile | A flight manual for the F-16 fighter jet was posted by a user discussing the use of the AIM-120 AMRAAM. Although the classified status of the document had expired, it contained export-restricted data and thus was illegal to publish under US law. The document was quickly deleted by moderators. |
| January 18, 2023 | F-15E fighter jet | Export restricted | Multiple core functions | Two days after the previous leak, thirteen documents about the McDonnell Douglas F-15E Strike Eagle fighter jet were posted and swiftly removed. The documents were of similar classification as the documents about the F-16. |
| Late January 2023 | Sukhoi Su-57 fighter jet | Declassified | Radar cross-section | Between January 19 and January 22, a document was published on the forums detailing the Su-57's radar cross-section, as well as details on its airframe. The leak also included information about other Russian aircraft. |
| Late January 2023 | Mikoyan MiG-29 fighter jet | Declassifed | Radar cross-section, armament | The leak revealing details on the Sukhoi Su-57 also revealed information regarding the MiG-29 and its armament capabilities. The leak shared information regarding the MiG-29's radar properties, claiming as its source a MiG-29 manual. Both posts were subsequently deleted by the War Thunder forum moderation team. |
| August 31, 2023 | Eurofighter Typhoon DA7 fighter jet | Export restricted | Flight manual | A user on the War Thunder forum posted a flight manual which contained information about the Eurofighter Typhoon's systems, weaponry, flight data, etc. The user leaked the documents in an effort to have the Eurofighter DA7 added to the game. The post was later deleted. |
| September 12, 2023 | Lockheed F-117 Nighthawk stealth attack aircraft | Export restricted | Flight manual | A user posted restricted pages of a flight manual which contained information about the Lockheed F-117 Nighthawk's engine specifications, firing angles, sensor locations, etc., on the War Thunder forum. The post was deleted shortly after by the site's moderators. |
| September 15, 2023 | Boeing AH-64D Apache helicopter | Export restricted | Technical manual | A user posted a flight manual which contained technical information about the Boeing AH-64D Apache. While the document was fully unclassified, the nature of the export-restricted data meant it was quickly removed. |
| December 11, 2023 | Norinco VT-4 tank | Unclassified | Technical documentation | A user posted training material for an export variant of the VT-4 tank, focused on the tank's autoloader system. Although the data was available elsewhere, it was removed in the same way as earlier incidents. |
| December 12, 2023 | M2A2 Bradley IFV | Export restricted | Technical manual | A user posted two pages out of a technical manual involving the turret assembly of the M2A2 Bradley. While the document is unclassified, the fact that this document is export-controlled resulted in it being quickly removed. |
| July 15, 2024 | T-90M, T-90S, T-80BVM tanks | Classified | Technical documentation | A user posted classified technical manuals for the T-90M, T-80BVM, and T-90S Russian main battle tanks, all of which are still currently in service in Russia's military. The post was quickly removed by the site's moderators. |
| December 11, 2024 | Eurofighter Typhoon | Classified and export-restricted | Flight specifications | A user posted classified Italian Ministry of Defense technical documentation for the supercruise capability of the Italian variant of the Eurofighter Typhoon, part of War Thunder's forthcoming Storm Warning update. The post was quickly removed by the site's moderators, who stated that Gaijin had confirmed with the ministry that disclosing the information was illegal. |
| December 2024 | Eurofighter Typhoon | Classified | Radar specifications | Despite being warned against doing so, a user posted classified Italian Ministry of Defense technical documentation for the Euroradar CAPTOR during an argument on the differences between the CAPTOR-M and CAPTOR-E variants. The post was quickly removed by the site's moderators, who suspended the user. |
| June 23, 2025 | AV-8B Harrier II | Export Restricted | Aircraft Training Manual | A user posted a restricted section from an AV-8B and TAV-8B Harrier NATOPS manual during an argument. Moderators removed the post from the forum and the user received a temporary ban. |
| June 19, 2026 | M1 Abrams Sep V3 | Classified | Experimental result | One of the forum moderators accidentally leaked a classified document about test results for the M1 Abrams Sep V3. |

The repeated incidents have become a notable part of War Thunder's community culture, particularly because the documents are often posted not for espionage or financial gain, but during arguments over the accuracy of vehicles in the game. Players have sometimes attempted to use technical manuals, armour specifications, weapons documentation, or other restricted material as evidence that a vehicle has been incorrectly modelled, with the apparent expectation that the information will persuade Gaijin Entertainment to change the vehicle. This has led to the phenomenon becoming an enduring joke within the community, commonly referred to as "sekrit dokuments" or "classified documents", while also attracting attention from mainstream and military-oriented media.

The incidents have also produced an unusual situation for Gaijin. The company promotes War Thunder in part through detailed modelling of real military vehicles, but its developers generally rely on information that is legally available to the public. Consequently, the publication of restricted information does not necessarily help resolve the dispute that prompted the leak; Gaijin has repeatedly stated that it will not use such material and has instead warned users to provide only information that is legally declassified and publicly distributable.

The seriousness of the leaks is debated outside the community. Some reporting has described the publication of restricted technical information as a potential security concern, particularly when it concerns equipment still in military service, while other coverage has noted that the significance of individual documents varies considerably and that not every document described as a "military secret" is classified at the highest levels or contains information that is necessarily useful to an adversary. The incidents therefore range from genuinely classified material to documents that are unclassified but subject to export or distribution restrictions, making the commonly used description of the phenomenon as "classified document leaks" somewhat imprecise.

The phenomenon has become sufficiently associated with War Thunder that Gaijin has incorporated references to it into the game's community culture, including jokes and cosmetic items referring to "sekrit dokuments". The recurring nature of the incidents has made them an unusual example of a video game community in which disputes over virtual representations of real military equipment have occasionally resulted in the publication of real-world military documentation.

== Reception ==
Reception

Aggregate score
| Aggregator | Score |
|---|---|
| Metacritic | PC: 81/100; PS4: 76/100; XONE: 80/100 |

Review scores
| Publication | Score |
|---|---|
| Eurogamer | 9/10 |
| GameSpot | 8/10 |
| IGN | 7.2 |
| PC Gamer (US) | 78/100 |

Awards
| Publication | Award |
|---|---|
| Gamescom | Best Simulation Game (2013) |
| Russian Game Developers Conference | Best Developer, Best Game, Best Technology, Best Sound Design (2013) |
| Guinness World Records | Most planes in a flight simulation game (2014); Most players online simultaneously on one Flight Simulation server (2014) |

At release, War Thunder was well-received with generally positive reviews. GameSpot praised it for its variety of airplanes and visuals, whereas IGN criticized the user interface for being "overly abundant and cumbersome" in contrast to the "sparse in-battle HUD".

War Thunder Mobile is "decently polished and balanced", according to MiniReview. On the Apple App Store, War Thunder Mobile is rated 4.8 out of 5, with 97,000 reviews, while on the Google Play store, it is rated 4.6 out of 5, with 405,000 reviews.
