= Index of DOS games (E) =

This is an index of DOS games.

This list has been split into multiple pages. Please use the Table of Contents to browse it.

Title	Released	Developer(s)	Publisher(s)
E-Motion	1990	The Assembly Line	U.S. Gold
Eagle Eye Mysteries	1993	Stormfront Studios	EA*Kids
Eagle Eye Mysteries in London	1994	Stormfront Studios	EA*Kids
Earl Weaver Baseball	1987	Don Daglow, Eddie Dombrower	Electronic Arts
Earth 2140	1997	TopWare	TopWare, Interplay Entertainment
Earthly Delights	1983	Datamost	Datamost
Earthrise	1990	Interstel Corporation	Interstel Corporation
Earthworm Jim	1995	Shiny Entertainment	Activision
Earthworm Jim 2	1996	Shiny Entertainment	Playmates Interactive
East vs. West: Berlin 1948	1989	Time Warp Productions	Rainbow Arts
Echelon	1988	Access Software	Access Software
EcoQuest - The Search for Cetus	1991	Sierra Entertainment	Sierra Entertainment
EcoQuest2 - Lost Secret of the Rainforest	1993	Sierra Entertainment	Sierra Entertainment
Ecstatica	1994	Andrew Spencer Studios	Psygnosis
Ecstatica II	1997	Andrew Spencer Studios	Psygnosis
Edward O. Thorp's Real Blackjack	1990		Villa Crespo Software
EF2000	1995	Digital Image Design	Ocean Software
EF2000 TACTCOM	1996	Digital Image Design	Ocean Software
EF2000: Special Edition	1996	Digital Image Design	Ocean Software
Eight Ball Deluxe	1993	LittleWing	Amtex
El Capitan Trueno	1990	Dinamic Software	Dinamic Software
Elder Scrolls: Arena	1994	Bethesda Softworks	Bethesda Softworks
Elder Scrolls: Daggerfall	1996	Bethesda Softworks	Bethesda Softworks
Elder Scrolls Legends: Battlespire	1997	Bethesda Softworks	Bethesda Softworks
Elder Scrolls Adventures: Redguard	1998	Bethesda Softworks	Bethesda Softworks
Electroman	1993	xLand Games	Epic MegaGames
El-Fish	1993	AnimaTek	Mindscape, Maxis
Elite	1987	Realtime Games	Firebird Software
Elite Plus	1991	Realtime Games	Rainbird Software
Elvira: Mistress of the Dark	1990	Horrorsoft	Accolade
Elvira: The Arcade Game	1991	Flair Software	Flair Software
Elvira II: The Jaws of Cerberus	1992	Horrorsoft	Accolade
Emergency Room	1995	Legacy Software	Legacy Software
Empire: Wargame of the Century	1987	Northwest Software	Interstel Corporation
Empire Deluxe	1993	White Wolf Productions	New World Computing
Enchanter	1983	Infocom	Infocom
Encounter	1984		
Ephesians	1993	Christian Distribution Network	
Epic Pinball	1993	Digital Extremes	Epic MegaGames
Eradicator	1996	Accolade	Accolade
Eric the Unready	1993	Legend Entertainment	Legend Entertainment
Escape from the Planet of the Robot Monsters	1990	Tengen Inc.	Domark
ESPN Extreme Games	1996	Sony Interactive Studios America	Sony Interactive Studios America
Eternam	1992	Infogrames	Infogrames
European Championship 1992	1992	Elite Systems	Elite Systems
European Superleague	1991	Matrix Developments	CDS Software
Executive Suite	1982	Armonk Corporation	Armonk Corporation
Exodus: Journey to the Promised Land	1991	Color Dreams	Wisdom Tree
Exploration	1994	Software 2000	Software 2000
Extreme Assault	1997	Blue Byte	Blue Byte
Extreme Pinball	1995	Epic Games	Electronic Arts
Extreme Rise of the Triad	1995	Apogee Software	Apogee Software
Eye of Horus	1989	Denton Designs	Mindscape, Prism Leisure
Eye of the Beholder	1991	Westwood Studios	Strategic Simulations
Eye of the Beholder II - The Legend of Darkmoon	1991	Westwood Studios	Strategic Simulations
Eye of the Beholder III - Assault on Myth Drannor	1993	Strategic Simulations	Softgold Computerspiele
