= Fred Gray (composer) =

Composer of 80s game soundtracks

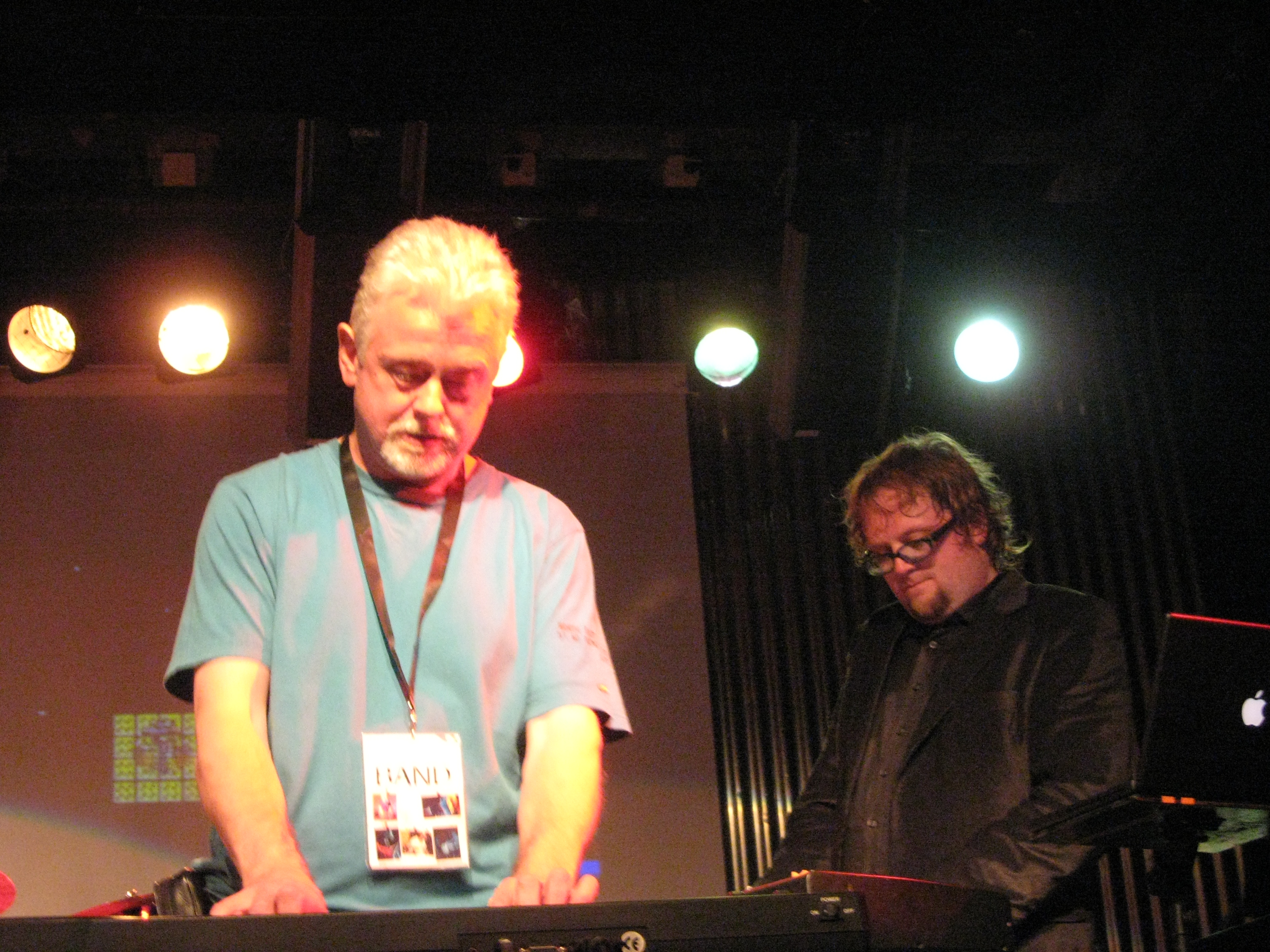
Fred Gray (left) and Reyn Ouwehand (right) performing at Back in Time Live 2008

Fred Gray is a composer of video game music. Among his works on Commodore 64 are Shadowfire, Mutants, Madballs and Enigma Force. On the Amiga he made the music for games such as Black Lamp, Eco, Stargoose and Victory Road.

Gray was an employee of Imagine software, and went freelance after the company went out of business. Much of his work appeared in games published by Ocean. He also received commissions from Denton Designs.

In 2001 Gray said he was no longer working in the computer games industry, and was teaching adults how to use computers in Liverpool.
