= F29 Retaliator =

1989 video game

- Developer: Digital Image Design
- Publisher: Ocean Software
- Designer: Martin Kenwright
- Programmers: Phillip Allsopp; Russell Payne
- Artists: Martin Kenwright; Joanne Drury
- Composer: Matthew Cannon
- Platforms: Amiga, Atari ST, MS-DOS, FM Towns, PC-98
- Release: 1989: Amiga, ST; 1991: MS-DOS; 1992: PC-98; 1993: FM Towns
- Genre: Combat flight simulator
- Modes: Single-player, multiplayer

F29 Retaliator is a combat flight simulator video game developed by Digital Image Design and published by Ocean Software in 1989 for Amiga and Atari ST, 1991 for MS-DOS, 1992 for PC-98, and 1993 for FM Towns. The game was developed during the end of the Cold War, based mostly on speculations on then-future aircraft that were expected to be in use by the year 2002, in particular based on the design of the Lockheed Martin F-22 and the Grumman X-29A.

== Gameplay ==
The graphics were detailed by the standards of the period, featuring cities, bridges, roads, islands, mountains and moving vehicles. The cockpit of either the F-22 or the X-29A has three multi-function displays available to set up in a number of configurations. The fantastic "future" weapons to choose from include a fighter-carried Tomahawk cruise missile, rearward-firing AIM-9 Sidewinder air-to-air missiles and a gigantic cluster bomb.

The game includes four war scenarios (Arizona desert test and training sites, Pacific conflict, Middle East conflict and the World War III in Europe) each with several missions, with the total number of those adding up to 99. The last mission of the game can be any of three, and completion of each one leads to different game endings. The PC version allowed head-to head dogfighting using a null modem cable.

== Reception ==
The game received 4 out of 5 stars in Dragon. Computer Gaming World described F29 as a less-expensive alternative which "still offers a solid game-playing experience, with limitations". While noting limitations such as a small game environment, the magazine concluded that "despite its limitations, F-29 is an enjoyable diversion" for those new to flight simulators. A 1992 survey in the magazine of wargames with modern settings gave the game three stars out of five, and a 1994 survey in the magazine gave it two stars out of five, describing it as "rather generic in nature". Retaliator was ranked the 36th best game of all time by Amiga Power in 1991.

== Legacy ==
A "Special Mission" add-on was released with ZERO magazine in 1990, featuring a battle against the alien spacecraft from the then-upcoming space combat game EPIC. Retaliator 2, announced in 1990 to be released in the first quarter of 1991, was never released as the team concentrated on finishing EPIC (released in 1992 and using an improved engine of F29). DID would later create three further, much more realistic F-22 simulators: TFX (1993), F-22: Air Dominance Fighter (1997), and F-22 Total Air War (1998).
