= Eurofighter (disambiguation) =

Eurofighter is the Eurofighter Typhoon, a model of jet fighter.

Eurofighter or Eurofighter Typhoon may also refer to:

== Roller coasters ==
- Gerstlauer Euro-Fighter, a model of roller coaster built by Gerstlauer Amusement Rides
- Eurofighter (Zoosafari Fasanolandia), a Gerstlauer Euro-Fighter model roller coaster at Zoosafari Fasanolandia amusement park and zoo, Italy
- Typhoon (Bobbejaanland), a Gerstlauer Euro-Fighter model roller coaster at Bobbejaanland amusement park, Belgium

== Other uses ==
- Eurofighter GmbH, a multinational company that coordinates the design, production and upgrade of the Eurofighter Typhoon
- EF2000 (video game), a combat flight simulation game published by Ocean Software
- Eurofighter Typhoon (video game), a combat flight simulation game published by Rage Software
