= Bandersnatch (disambiguation) =

A bandersnatch is a fictional creature in Lewis Carroll's novel Through the Looking-Glass and poem The Hunting of the Snark.

Bandersnatch may also refer to:

== Arts and entertainment ==
- Bandersnatch (Known Space), a sluglike sentient creature in Larry Niven's fictional Known Space universe
- Bandersnatch (video game), a computer game written by Imagine Software and later released as Brataccas
- Black Mirror: Bandersnatch, an interactive film of the anthology series Black Mirror
- Bandersnatch, a race in the Shadowrun role-playing game
- Bandersnatch, a newspaper run by John Abbott College students

== Other uses ==
- 9780 Bandersnatch, an asteroid

== See also ==
- Frumious Bandersnatch, an American psychedelic rock band active in the 1960s
