= Star Goose =

1988 video game

- UK "IBM PC & Compatibles" release
- Publisher: Logotron
- Designers: Steven Cain; Graham Everett
- Programmer: Graham Everett
- Artist: Steven Cain
- Platforms: Amiga, Atari ST, MS-DOS
- Release: 1988
- Genre: Scrolling shooter
- Mode: Single-player

Star Goose (stylized with an exclamation mark and sometimes Stargoose) is a vertically scrolling shooter that was published for the Amiga, Atari ST, and MS-DOS by Logotron in 1988. The player controls Scouser-Gitt, who pilots the eponymous Star Goose, a vessel that has been commissioned to scour the planet Nom and collect 48 crystals. Players must collect all six crystals in each of the game's eight levels to advance, while at the same time avoiding or destroying enemies and maintaining their shield, ammunition, and fuel levels. The game's surfaces are contoured, which affects the way that bullets travel, and contain tunnels that switch modes to a three-dimensional perspective where the player can replenish their resources.

Developed by Steve Cain and Graham Everett, the original concept was a racing game based on the three-dimensional tunnel mode, but this idea was scrapped after the designers became unsatisfied with the results. Originally priced at £19.95, the game received mixed reviews for its Amiga release, and negative ones for the Atari ST version, with reviewers praising the graphics, but criticizing the lack of variety in the gameplay, its difficulty, and the audio. Re-releases in 1991 at budget prices were better received.

== Gameplay ==
Amiga screenshot

Star Goose is a single-player vertically scrolling shooter where the player controls the character of Scouser-Gitt, a pilot who flies the eponymous Star Goose vessel. In the game's background story, Scouser-Gitt is an experienced, but disgraced fighter pilot who is recruited by a Tribal Elder to recover 48 crystals from the planet Nom by raiding the military's ammunition dumps. There are six crystals located on each of the game's eight levels, and the player must retrieve all of them to advance. To do so, they must either bypass or destroy the planet's defense systems, which include missile launchers, gun turrets, mines, and vessels piloted by enemy warriors.

Star Goose begins with a mother ship dropping off Scouser-Gitt directly above the surface of the area in a Star Goose ship. Each level wraps-around, and thus the player returns to the start of the level once they have traveled through it and will do so again unless all six crystals have been collected. The player begins with four lives and receives an extra life with every 100,000 points. When the player runs out of lives, they have the option to restart the game on the level they were playing previously. The default weapon is a forward-facing gun, but the Star Goose is also equipped with a limited supply of missiles that can be fired from either side of the vehicle and destroy enemies on contact. These can be replenished at missile gates located in each level. Each level in the game constantly scrolls the screen upwards and contains contoured hills and valleys that the ship navigates automatically, but affect the direction of the player's bullets. Shots fired will only hit enemies when the ship is traveling at the same level; otherwise they go above or below their targets depending on whether the player is climbing a hill or descending into a valley.

The player must also keep track of three gauges: shields, ammunition, and fuel. The former decreases every time the Star Goose collides with an enemy or is hit by their fire, while the latter two are depleted with use. To replenish these metres, the player must enter a tunnel labelled with the resource that they wish to recover; these tunnels are spread across the level on the sides of hills. Upon entering a tunnel, the game switches to a three-dimensional perspective, viewing the Star Goose inside a circular space from behind. These areas contain hovering eyes that can be collected to replenish the gauge. The player can climb the sides of the tunnel, reach the ceiling, and travel in a loop, depending on their speed. If the Star Goose is upside down upon exiting the tunnel, however, it will crash and the player will lose a life. Similar tunnels in the ground at the start of each level serve as a means to connect each level and contain eyes that can be collected for points.

== Development and release ==
Star Goose was developed by artist Steve Cain and programmer Graham Everett, who previously developed the platform game Black Lamp from Firebird Software. Cain also worked on the graphics for 1985's Frankie Goes to Hollywood from Denton Designs. Everett intended Star Goose to be a first-person perspective racing game through the same tunnels that were used in the finished product. Everett claimed that he was "inspired [...] by the kind of car race, often seen in movies, where the cars race around a basin-like track with curved sides." Unsatisfied with the result, the concept was modified into a shoot 'em up.

Star Goose was published by Logotron for the Atari ST and Amiga computers in 1988 and was ported to MS-DOS at the end of the year. A Commodore 64 version was planned, but never released. The music and sound effects were ported from the Atari ST to the Amiga, which limited their impact. Depending on the system, the game can be played with the mouse, joystick, or keyboard. Logotron claimed that the graphics featured "Full-Beef Scroll," meaning that it was meant to look an arcade screen with the graphics taking up the entire screen and the playing information placed directly in the game area, rather than having it at the edge of the screen.

== Reception and legacy ==
Star Goose received mixed reviews for its Amiga release. Reviewing the game for Amiga Computing, Chris Holmes argued that the game was difficult and that once the player has learned to overcome this, "the game becomes a touch monotonous as the action does not vary." He rated the game at 66%, docking points for the sound in particular. Steve Jarratt of Commodore User complained that in the Amiga version "the gameplay fails to fulfil [sic] the promise of the graphics" and gave it a 4 out of 10. The following month, the French gaming magazine Génération 4 rated it at 45%, criticizing its similarity to other games in the genre and calling it a "pale copy of Zaxxon", although praising its graphics. Conversely, Richard Silsby of Australian Commodore and Amiga Review, in the July 1989 issue, recommended the Amiga version due to its graphics and music. Tomas Hybner, in the October 1988 edition of the Swedish Datormagazin, gave the game 3.75 out of 5 and called it "original", also highlighting its graphics.

Reviews for Star Goose on the Atari ST were more negative. Andy Wilton of ACE, writing in October 1988, noted that "[a] host of unusual features make it stand out" but "[o]riginality is no substitute for gameplay", as well as the fact that the contouring element did not mesh will with the rest of the game. The publication's final assessment gave Star Goose 517 out of 1000 for the Atari ST version. That same month, Julian Rignall of The One gave it a similar rating of 51% and mentioned that "compared with today's high standards it lacks the polish, playability and challenge of many similar priced games". The assessment from October 1988's issue of Zzap!64 was even lower, highlighting the game's general presentation as positive, but criticizing the graphics and gameplay for a lack of variety and the sound for its lack of originality, with an overall rating of 37%. In November 1988, Matt Bielby of Computer and Video Games gave the game a 72%, but held the graphics and music in low esteem and referred to the game overall as one with good potential that "botches the job". In giving the game a 68% in November 1988, ST/Amiga Format praised its graphics, but criticized the gameplay and the audio, while ST Action scored it at 71% the same month.

Star Goose was re-released by Prism Leisure Corporation in late 1991 for £2.99 and received more favourable reviews. Stuart Campbell, writing for Amiga Power, gave the re-release an 82%, referring to it as "limited", but arguing that it was a good value for the price. Around that time it was also distributed by Pactronics' Budget Series, albeit for £12.95. Australian Commodore and Amiga Review, which had recommended the game when it was first released, upheld its recommendation with a 77% for the re-release, praising the graphics and gameplay.
