= Enigma Force =

Enigma Force may refer to:

- The Enigma Force (comics), which creates Captain Universe
- Enigma Force (video game)
- Enigma Force: a strike force of the United Liberation Front of Asom
