= Epic (video game) =

1992 video game

- Developer: Digital Image Design
- Publishers: Ocean Software; Imagineer (PC-98)
- Designer: Martin Kenwright
- Programmers: Colin Bell; Russell Payne; Phil Allsopp (Amiga)
- Artists: Martin Kenwright; Paul Hollywood
- Composers: David Whittaker; Øisten Eide
- Platforms: Amiga; Atari ST; MS-DOS; PC-98
- Release: EU/NA: 1992; JP: 10 December 1993 (PC-98)
- Genre: Space combat simulator
- Mode: Single-player

Epic (or Epic: The Adventure Begins) is a space combat simulator developed by Digital Image Design and published by Ocean Software for the Commdore Amiga and Atari ST in early 1992. A port to MS-DOS also appeared in the same year, followed by a version for the PC-98 in 1993. A sequel, Inferno, was released in 1994.

== Gameplay ==
Epic is an action-based space flight simulator game. It features eight completely different levels (including two in two phases), which take place either in space or over the surface of a planet. Each has a tight time limit to complete the mission (destroying the assigned targets); failure results in the loss of one of the player's ships, and may affect the gameplay in subsequent missions.

== Plot ==
The plot borrowed heavily from the television series Battlestar Galactica, Star Trek and the Star Wars film franchise, focussing on a fleet of ships carrying the human inhabitants of a planet threatened by an imminent supernova. Their escape route leads through Rexxon Empire territory; however, the Rexxons doubt the humans' motives, and refuse safe passage. With no other option, the humans are forced to attempt a crossing anyway, leading to war between the two.

As the game progresses, it becomes apparent to the Rexxon scientists monitoring the humans' sun that the exodus is indeed genuine. However, the Rexxon military suppresses this knowledge and doubles down on the efforts to stop the humans' fleet, deepening the conflict.

The player controls the fleet's only hope, one of three experimental Epic class fighters. In the final mission, the fighter is also used to deploy a cobalt bomb.

== Development ==
The game had been in development for about three years and had been repeatedly delayed. At first it was known under the working title Goldrunner 3D and was initially announced to be published by Microdeal as a spiritual sequel to the two Uridium-like Goldrunner top-down shooting games, before a publishing deal was signed with Ocean in 1989.

Much of the technology that was used to create F29 Retaliator had been used to create Epic. The action is viewed in 3D, with graphics being a mix of uniformly-coloured polygons and bitmaps (featuring 16 colours for Atari ST and 32 colours in the Amiga version, largely shades of grey). Cut-scenes that move the story along vary between the versions; the Atari ST and Amiga versions are largely the same, a combination of pre-rendered 3D artwork overlaid with dynamically generated ships, and more conventional artwork where characters are involved. On the Atari ST, some pre-rendered images have been dropped and replaced with similar, animated bitmap versions of the same scene. The PC release, which unlike the Amiga and Atari ST versions was only ever intended to be installed and run from a hard disk, has enhanced cut-scenes reflecting the extra resources available to the developers. Other graphics are more detailed, including the Epic fighter's cockpit and the in-game 3D ship models have been changed subtly. The Rexxon fighters, for example, are less angular.

In game music for both the Atari ST and PC features Mars, the Bringer of War and the Jupiter, the Bringer of Jollity from The Planets by Gustav Holst, the Atari ST rendition being composed of samples. The Amiga received a new composition.

The game's box art was provided by Bob Wakelin, in one of his last commissions from Ocean. While approved by the publisher's management, it was not liked by the developers. Wakelin later alleged that one of them had given him his brief when intoxicated. The look of the pilot was based on both Harrison Ford and Mel Gibson.

== Release ==
Epic was released by Ocean in the Spring of 1992 on home computer formats at a price of £25.99 in the UK. Some releases included a bonus anaglyphic 3D poster of the game's box art, complete with branded glasses. According to Amiga Power, the initial release version of Epic had a fatal glitch that caused the game to crash, leading to many returns of the game.

Later that year, it was included as the lead pack-in title by Commodore UK for their Amiga 600-focused Epic bundle, alongside Rome: Pathway to Power and Myth: History in the Making, squarely aimed at the Christmas buying market. Unlike the retail release, this version could only be run from the Amiga 600's hard disk.

Subsequently, the game received a budget re-release in 1994, on Ocean's Hit Squad label. In December 2019 the PC version of the game was re-released digitally, bundled with its sequel Inferno.

== Reception ==
Reception

Review scores
Publication	Score
Mega Zone	92%
CU Amiga	91% (Amiga); 70% (Amiga re-release)
Amiga User International	91% (Amiga)
Amiga Action	90% (Amiga)
ST Format	91% (Atari ST)
ACE	839/1000 (Amiga, ST)
Amiga Power	34% (Amiga); 30% (Amiga re-release)
Amiga Format	34% (Amiga)

Critical reception of Epic was mixed. A number of magazines scored the game highly, including review scores of 92% for the PC version from Mega Zone, 91% from CU Amiga and Amiga User International, and 90% from Amiga Action. ACE, for instance, gave the Amiga and ST versions a score of 839 (out of a possible 1000), praising its fast 3D graphics and sense of scale, but disliking its longevity and lack of depth. In ST Format, the game received a score of 91% and was described as "the best blaster that the ST has seen in some time".

The title fared less well with Amiga Power which gave the game 34%, noting its many glitches and gameplay problems, such as mission time limits. The magazine's reviewer concluded that Epic felt "rushed" and "unfinished", and had prioritised looks over gameplay. Maff Evans in Amiga Format delivered a similar verdict and criticism, also awarding a score of 34%; he noted that the despite being two years late, the game felt rushed to release and expressed that the game was too short. The magazine also published feedback from players in the review, many of whom also completed the game shortly after purchase, complaining that a cheat mode for the game was included in the instructions.

With such a long gestation, the game was previewed to magazines long before release. The result was that some magazines included comments about features and shortcomings that were not present in the game that finally made it to the retailers. For example, CU Amiga referred to the Amiga version's music being from The Planets, although in the final release this was not the case.

Amiga Power's review went as far as criticising other magazines for reviewing an incomplete game and by extension, misleading their readership.

"Other reviews which you may have read in other magazines - usually glowing, we might add - which appeared up to six or seven months ago were based on fairly early demo versions, and are thus completely invalid. We'll say it now and say it loud - reviewing unfinished games does the reader no service at all, and if you suspect a magazine of doing so, and there are a lot which are guilty in this instance, you should either make their lives hell or simply stop buying their mag."

On re-release, all magazines marked the game down, with Amiga Power providing a renewed rating of 30%, commenting that the game had not improved with age. CU Amiga was more generous in its scoring, awarding the title 70%, but less so in its comments highlighting the game's lack of depth, although the reviewer did mention that it played much better on the faster Amiga 1200, which was not released at the time the game first appeared.

== Expansion pack ==
An expansion pack for the game, Epic Extra Missions, was included on the cover disk for issue 47 of The One which was only issued for the game on the Amiga. The magazine suggested that other packs would be made available for the game, however there was no commercial release.
