= Miami Vice (video game) =

1986 video game

- Commodore 64 cover art
- Developer: Canvas
- Publisher: Ocean Software
- Composers: Martin Galway, Jan Hammer
- Platforms: Amstrad CPC, Commodore 64, ZX Spectrum
- Release: UK: August 1986; EU: 1989
- Genre: Action
- Mode: Single-player

Miami Vice is an action video game developed by Canvas and published by Ocean Software. It was first released in the United Kingdom for the Amstrad CPC, Commodore 64, and ZX Spectrum in 1986. It was later re-released in Germany and Italy for the Commodore 64 in 1989. The game is based on the television series of the same name and follows the two central characters, James "Sonny" Crockett and Ricardo Tubbs, as they attempt to derail a Miami drug ring which is led by series antagonist "Mr J".

The game was published by Ocean Software, who were renowned for developing video games related to their respective films and television shows. The main objective of the game is to apprehend criminals throughout the streets of Miami, which is accomplished by driving to various locations around the city. Miami Vice received mixed reviews upon release; the game was mainly criticised due to its poor mechanics and graphics, though some reviewers praised the overall experience.

== Gameplay ==
Crockett and Tubbs may use their car in order to proceed to various destinations throughout Miami.

The game is presented in a top-down perspective with elements of 2D side-scrolling gameplay. The main objective of the game is to derail various shipments of drugs controlled by the Miami Vice series antagonist, Mr J. The player assumes control of series protagonists James "Sonny" Crockett and Ricardo Tubbs, in which they must eliminate gangsters throughout Miami. To accomplish this end, Crockett and Tubbs can drive their car through the streets of Miami in order to get to various destinations, such as City Hall, Vines Bar, State Hotel, Shark Club, Joes Bar, Flag Hotel, Grand Casino, Palm Club, Murk Club, Ocean Warehouse, Acme Warehouse and Sierra Hotel, quicker. If the player collides into a wall or another car whilst driving, a small explosion will occur and a life will be deducted.

At a labelled building, the player can get out of the car and enter, though enemies will only appear during certain times of the day. If the player arrives too early, the enemy gangsters will attempt to escape. If the player arrives too late, the building will be found vacant. A timetable of all meetings are included in the game's instruction manual. The aesthetic interior of buildings include two rooms, with limited decorations such as a pool table and chairs. Some buildings contain evidence bags which can be collected for extra points. Once the player comes into contact with an enemy, a separate window will appear which will display his name. The player can apprehend him by either catching or trapping him. Once caught, the player may take him to the city hall to interrogate him in order to receive information such as the location of the next gangster meetup. Points are gained by apprehending criminals, returning evidence bags or destroying cars.

== Reception ==
Reception

Review scores
Publication	Score
Crash	27%
Computer and Video Games	8/10%
Your Sinclair	8/10
Zzap!64	30%

The game received mixed to negative reviews upon release. Pete Shaw of Your Sinclair praised the overall experience of the game, including the "fast paced" gameplay and lack of an intrusive plot. However, he criticised the "terrible" attribute clash issues in the 'Frankie goes to Florida' mode, in which he states that the mode causes graphical errors. Three reviewers of Zzap!64 stated that the graphics were "simplistic", but found them to be crisp and colourful. Chris Bourne of Crash, however, criticised the graphics as "dodgy" and "drab". Jim Lloyd of Computer and Video Games praised the music and its ability to change once the player moves from a car to building; however, he theorised that the game would sell due to "its name". Bourne criticised the game's lack of music for the Amstrad port and limited range of sound effects.

Miami Vice received particular criticism at the difficulty of manoeuvring the car. Edward Drury of Computer Gamer, though finding the game to be enjoyable at times, stated that his only dislike was the manoeuvrability of the car, remarking that the game "gets boring" due to the amount of collisions. Bourne was highly critical of the mechanics of the car, finding it to be "ludicrous" and taking "at least half an hour to get used to". He concluded that the game was "very bad". Jim Lloyd of Computer and Video Games and a reviewer of Zzap!64 concurred that the controlling the car was a major issue.
