= Cosmic Wartoad =

1985 video game

- Developer: Denton Designs
- Publisher: Ocean
- Platform: ZX Spectrum
- Release: 1985
- Genre: Action
- Mode: Single player

Cosmic Wartoad is an action game developed by Denton Designs for the ZX Spectrum. It was published by Ocean and released in the UK in 1985.

== Gameplay and Plot ==
The queen of the cosmic wartoads has been kidnapped by the Rygellian Slime Beasts, turned into a human and is being held captive beneath the Slime King's Sludge Saw, which descends over the course of ninety minutes and will kill her if it is not stopped.

The player controls the Cosmic Wartoad as he attempts to rescue the queen. To achieve this he must travel across the Rygellian Timevoid, an 8x8 grid of "nodes", by entering a node, successfully completing the minigame within, and then entering an adjacent node, all the while collecting the eight pieces of the Cosmic Toolkit that will shut down the Sludge Saw. Each node contains one of several repeating minigames, which typically involve the Cosmic Wartoad fighting enemies.

The game finishes either when the Cosmic Wartoad successfully collects all eight pieces of the Toolkit and navigates his way across the grid to shut down the saw; when the Cosmic Wartoad loses all of his three lives; or when the ninety-minute game period expires.

== Development ==
Cosmic Wartoad was developed by Denton Designs for the ZX Spectrum. It was designed and drawn by Steve Cain, with code provided by John Gibson. It ultimately released in 1985, published by Ocean.

== Reception ==
The game received generally positive reviews on its release. Crash awarded it 88%, Sinclair User gave it four stars (out of a possible five), Your Sinclair scored it 8/10 and Your Computer rated it 3/5.
