= Gift from the Gods =

1984 video game

- ZX Spectrum cover
- Developer: Denton Designs
- Publisher: Ocean
- Designer: John Gibson
- Platform: ZX Spectrum
- Release: EU: 1984
- Genre: Adventure
- Mode: Single-player

Gift from the Gods is a British video game published in 1984 for the ZX Spectrum. Written by Denton Designs, a group of programmers and artists who worked on the unfinished Bandersnatch for the ill-fated software company Imagine Software.

== Plot ==
In the game you control your character Orestes, who must avenge his father's murder by returning to the palace of Mycenae, entering its catacombs, and solving a puzzle. The game is based loosely on a Greek myth attributed to Homer, in which Agamemnon, the father of Orestes, is murdered by his wife Clytaemnestra. In the myth, Orestes along with his sister Electra, avenge their father's death by killing their mother, Clytaemnestra.

== Gameplay ==
Essentially a maze game, there are 16 rooms each containing four "Euclidean shapes" - six of which are real and must be taken to the Guardians chamber, which will then allow Orestes to escape, the remaining 58 being just illusions. Orestes' sister Electra will point him in the direction of the nearest room with a real shape, and point at it. Most rooms have four illusions, and a single room can contain several real shapes. If Orestes slays one of the large magical monsters found in the maze the illusions will disappear for a short while making the choice easier.

Clytaemnestra is also in the maze, and will kill Electra if the two meet, making the task all the more difficult to accomplish Orestes stamina is sapped by the maze monsters, and can be replenished by either entering the Guardians chamber which instantly restores health, or by finding life giving water that drips from the ceiling replenishing at a much slower rate.

Orestes can walk, run, fly and fight using the same set of controls. If Orestes is near a monster fight mode will be used, whereas if he is near a ledge he will fly over.

The maze is not straightforward, for instance moving first up then right will take Orestes to a different room than moving first right then up, however, it is mappable as the map logic is consistent.

== Reception ==
Reception

Review scores
| Publication | Score |
|---|---|
| Crash | 84% |
| Computer and Video Games | 34/40 |
| Sinclair User | 6/10 |
