= RoboCop 3 (video game) =

1991 video game

- North American SNES box art
- Developers: Digital Image Design (Amiga, ST, MS-DOS); Eden Entertainment Software (Game Gear, Genesis, Master System); Ocean Software (SNES); Probe Software (NES, C64)
- Publishers: Ocean Software; Flying Edge (Genesis, Master System, Game Gear)
- Programmers: Grant Harrison (NES); Simon Nicol (NES); Allan Shortt (SNES)
- Composers: Jeroen Tel (NES, C64); Jonathan Dunn (SNES); Matt Furniss (Genesis, Master System, Game Gear)
- Series: RoboCop
- Platform: List: Amiga, MS-DOS, Atari ST, ZX Spectrum, NES, Super NES, Commodore 64, Game Gear, Master System, Mega Drive/Genesis
- Release: December 1991: Amiga, MS-DOS; EU: December 1991; NA: 1992 Atari ST; EU: December 1991 ZX Spectrum; UK: April 1992 NES; NA: August 1992; PAL: July 28, 1994 Super NES; NA: September 1992; PAL: 1992 C64; EU: 1992; NA: 1992 Game Gear; EU: September 1993; NA: November 1993 Master System; EU: November 1993 Mega Drive/Genesis; NA/EU: November 1993
- Genres: Platform, shooter
- Mode: Single-player

RoboCop 3 is a video game based on the 1993 film of the same name. Amiga, Atari ST, and MS-DOS versions were developed by Digital Image Design and published by Ocean Software in December 1991. The Digital Image Design version includes multiple gameplay styles. During 1992 and 1993, other versions consisting of side-scrolling platform gameplay were released for the Commodore 64, ZX Spectrum, NES, Super NES, Game Gear, Master System, and Genesis.

== Gameplay ==
RoboCop 3 is based on the 1993 film of the same name, in which RoboCop, a cyborg police officer, attempts to stop a corporation from forcing the relocation of Detroit citizens so it can build the new Delta City.

The Digital Image Design version consists of five different game segments that include driving; shooting enemies to rescue hostages; hand-to-hand combat; flying a jet pack; and battling a robot ninja. This version includes the Arcade Action option, which allows the player to play any of the game's five sequences as a single mission with its own plot and mission objectives. The player can also play the game's sequences as part of an overall adventure story known as Movie Adventure with more characters and different enemies. For much of the Movie Adventure mode, the player is allowed to play any mission rather than following a specific arrangement. During this mode, the player can also choose to abort missions, which affects enemies' decisions as well as the plot. In between levels, a news broadcast is played to inform the player of the story and advance the game.

The Sega Genesis version is a shoot 'em up platform game, and is based on the SNES version. The Genesis version features six levels, while the side-scrolling NES version features five. In the Genesis version, the player has a flamethrower as an additional weapon that is absent from the NES and SNES versions. The ZX Spectrum version is a side-scrolling platform game that includes a horizontally scrolling shoot 'em up section. The ZX Spectrum version features only monochrome graphics, and also includes a jet pack ability for the player.

== Development and release ==
The Amiga, Atari ST, and MS-DOS versions were developed by Digital Image Design (DID), which began work on the game in September 1990. Orion Pictures initially kept most of the film's story details secretive, so the DID development team had to proceed using guesswork, which ultimately resulted in some mistakes. In one instance recalled by Martin Kenwright of DID, "Somebody mentioned that RoboCop was going to ride a 'Gyrocycle'. We took that to mean some powerful motor-cycle so we spent ages thinking about RoboCop racing about on a bike, only to find out later it was a jet-pack. Weeks of work were just wasted." The team had only film stills as a visual reference during development. Many of the game's ideas originated as sketches and storyboards, hand-drawn by artist Shaun Hollywood. The game was developed using a significantly modified version of the 3D game engine previously used by DID to develop F29 Retaliator.

The Digital Image Design version was published by Ocean Software in December 1991, before the eventual release of the film in 1993. To prevent piracy, Ocean had the Amiga version developed so it would not play without an included Electronic Key that plugged into the second joystick port of the user's computer. Despite this copy-protection measure, the game was cracked a week before it was officially released.

By April 1992, the ZX Spectrum version had been released in the United Kingdom. The SNES version was released in the United States and the United Kingdom during late 1992. The NES version was also released in the United States at the end of the year.

Other UK releases included a Game Gear version in July 1993, followed by the Genesis version in November 1993. The Genesis version had been released in the US in November 1993, and was published by Flying Edge, a division of Acclaim Entertainment. The SNES version was also released as an arcade game through the Nintendo Super System.

== Reception ==
Reception

Review scores
Publication	Score
AllGame	2/5 (SNES)
Amiga Computing	90% (AMI)
Amiga Format	91% (AMI)
Amiga Power	85/100 (AMI)
Crash	89% (ZX)
Computer and Video Games	64/100 (SNES); 94/100 (Amiga)
Mean Machines Sega	51/100 (SGG); 52/100 (Genesis)
Sinclair User	88% (ZX)
Super Play	66% (SNES)
Zero	91/100 (AMI)
Electronic Games	71% (SMD)
N-Force	48/100 (SNES)
The One	83% (AMI/AST)

The Amiga version received positive reviews for its music and 3D graphics. (Note: Attributed to multiple references:) Amiga Computing stated, "The cinematic feel has been captured well and really makes the game stand out from the usual film tie-in nonsense," concluding that it was probably "the best tie-in in the whole world." Paul Presley of The One wrote a positive review of the Amiga/Atari ST version, praising the "suitably gloomy atmosphere" but criticizing the "seemingly everlasting night", as well as the shoot 'em up and hand-to-hand combat levels. Presley also believed that the game should have better incorporated the RoboCop theme, noting the absence of the character's infrared vision.

Andy Hutchinson of Amiga Format praised the "Tense and atmospheric scenarios," and called the game "One of the most original film licences around for a long time." Matt Bielby of Amiga Power praised the music, calling it "moody, repetitive and quite simply brilliant." Bielby opined that the game included "some of the best driving and shoot-'em-up action of the year" while stating that the Movie Adventure mode "sets unprecedented standards for this sort of thing," writing that it "comes closer to the concept of an interactive movie than anything we've seen yet". In 1992, Amiga Power included the game in its list of the top 100 Amiga games released up to that time, ranking it at number 70.

Mean Machines Sega criticized the Game Gear version for its difficulty and "drab" backgrounds, but praised the music. Mean Machines Sega subsequently criticized the graphics of the Genesis version and called it an "insipid shooter with a ridiculous level of difficulty". Electronic Games criticized the Genesis version for its graphics and lack of originality.

The SNES version was also criticized for its difficulty, (Note: Attributed to multiple references:) including the player having to restart a level from the beginning after dying. N-Force criticized the SNES version's poor collision detection, the animation and sprites, the "appalling" sound effects, and the lack of variation, while noting that the backgrounds looked better than most average games. Jason Brookes of Super Play called the SNES version "a very forgettable release". Brookes noted the game's lack of digitized speech and stated that most players would be too frustrated by the game's difficulty. Brett Alan Weiss of AllGame criticized the SNES version for its lack of "originality, ingenuity or creativity". Weiss also criticized RoboCop for being slow and awkward to maneuver, stating that while the character moves slowly in the films, "a cumbersome, unwieldy protagonist rarely makes for a good character in an action game." Computer and Video Games criticized the SNES version as well for lack of originality, while also criticizing the simplistic gameplay. Nintendo Power praised the graphics and music of the SNES version.

Crash praised the ZX Spectrum version, calling it the best RoboCop game released up to that point. Crash praised the jet pack feature, but noted the game's difficulty. Ed Laurence of Sinclair User praised the graphics of the ZX Spectrum version, but criticized the difficulty, partly caused by an awkward control set-up. Laurence also criticized the game for its lack of advancement over its predecessors, but stated that it was still a "worthy" successor in the game series. Entertainment Weekly gave an unspecified version of the game a "C+" rating.
