= Last Rites (disambiguation) =

The last rites, in Catholicism, are the last prayers and ministrations given to many Catholics when possible shortly before death.

Last rites may also refer to:

== Religion ==
- Antyesti, in Hinduism
- Islamic funeral, in Islam
- Viduy, in the Jewish faith

== Film and television ==
- Last Rites (1988 film), a 1988 film starring Tom Berenger
- Last Rites (1975 film), a 1975 Australian comedy film
- Last Rites (1998 film), a TV film starring Randy Quaid
- "Last Rites" (Auf Wiedersehen, Pet), a 1984 television episode
- "Last Rites" (Law & Order: Criminal Intent), an episode of Law & Order: Criminal Intent
- "Last Rites" (Once Upon a Time), a fifth-season episode of the series
- "Last Rites" (Runaways), an episode of Runaways
- The Conjuring: Last Rites, a 2025 film

== Music ==
- Last Rites (band), an English goth-industrial band
- "Last Rites", a song by Black Veil Brides from Black Veil Brides
- "Last Rites/Loved to Death", a song by Megadeth from Killing Is My Business... and Business Is Good!
- Last Rites (album), a 2011 album by doom metal band Pentagram

== Other uses ==
- Last Rites (video game), a 1997 game by Ocean Software

== See also ==
- Last Rights (disambiguation)
