= Inferno (video game) =

1994 video game

- Developer: Digital Image Design
- Publisher: Ocean Software
- Designer: Shaun Hollywood
- Programmer: Colin Bell
- Artists: Robert Ball; Donna Chippendale; Shaun Hollywood
- Writers: Robert Ball; Shaun Hollywood
- Composers: Alien Sex Fiend; Barry Leitch
- Platform: MS-DOS
- Release: 1994
- Genre: Space combat simulator
- Mode: Single-player

Inferno (or Inferno : The Odyssey Continues) is a space combat simulator video game developed by Digital Image Design and published by Ocean Software in 1994 for MS-DOS. It is a sequel to the 1992 game Epic.

== Plot ==
Continuing the story of the Rexxon-Terran conflict from the game Epic, Inferno charts the adventures of a Terran pilot as he seeks revenge on the Rexxons, who had genetically altered him to become one of their own.

== Development ==
Inferno used the game engine from TFX, the game Digital Image Design released the previous year. Inferno was showcased at the 1993 Summer Consumer Electronics Show in Las Vegas, Nevada alongside TFX. A version for the Commodore Amiga was trailed in early 1994, alongside TFX, however this version was not released. Similarly, a port for the Atari Jaguar was also reported to be under development but never came to fruition.

In 1994, Inferno was shown at the European Computer Trade Show in the Business Design Centre in London, England.

== Release ==
The game was released in winter of 1994 on CD-ROM only; Inferno came with comic book that documented the story of the player's character, written by sometime 2000 AD contributor Sean Phillips.

An album of the same name based on the game's soundtrack by the band Alien Sex Fiend was released alongside the game, on Audio CD and vinyl.

In December 2019 the game was re-released digitally, bundled with the PC version of its prequel, Epic.

== Reception ==
Reception

Review scores
| Publication | Score |
|---|---|
| MikroBitti | 97% |
| Aktueller Software Markt | 11/12 |
| PC Games | 80% |
| PC Gamer | 76% |
| Next Generation | 3/5 |
| Dragon | 2.5/5; 3.5/5 |
| Computer Gaming World | 1/5 |
| Flux | B |

A reviewer for Next Generation gave Inferno three out of five stars, commenting that "Although [the] controls and equipment are truly inspired ... the gameplay often has a tendency to be a little hard to follow. Those with the patience to stick with it will find a unique gaming experience, but one that never fully achieves greatness." Dragon gave the game 2½ and 3½ out of 5 stars.

German gaming magazine Aktueller Software Markt gave Inferno an overall score of 11/12, and named it an ASM Hit. German gaming magazine PC Games gave an overall score of 80%. Finnish gaming magazine MikroBitti gave Inferno an exceptionally high score of 97%, and named the game a Bit Hit.

PC Gamer gave an overall score of 73%, and praised Inferno's gameplay due to its 'sense of scale', variety, and fast-paced action. PC Gamer however criticized the game's complex controls, but noted Inferno as a "state of the art" space opera shoot 'em up, despite having significant competition in the genre. Dan Amrich of Flux magazine praised the gameplay calling it "Ultra-speedy, dizzying interstellar action." The reviewer criticized the slippery controls and many pauses during gameplay. He also commented that although it doesn't have the charm like Wing Commander, In comparison he stated that Inferno has: "Far better 3D effects, a widely variable mission plan and wicked fast gameplay."

Computer Gaming World gave Inferno one out of five stars, calling its plot "generic" and "cheesy", and the game as a whole 'glitchy' and "tedious". CGW noted a vast difference in graphic quality between the game's cutscenes as compared to the rest of the game, reducing the game's graphics down to "flat-shaded polygons in primary colors", further stating that Inferno is "terribly mediocre" and "impossible to recommend [to anyone]" due to the abundance of other similar, better games. In 1996, CGW ranked it as the 44th worst game of all time, summarizing it as having a "Bad storyline, guttural voice acting, and way too many dull cinematics in a limp space shooter."
