= Wargasm (video game) =

1998 video game

- Developer: Digital Image Design
- Publishers: EU: Infogrames United Kingdom; NA: Infogrames Entertainment, Inc.
- Designer: Martin Kenwright
- Composer: Robin Anderson
- Engine: 3Dream
- Platform: Windows
- Release: EU: December 4, 1998; NA: January 13, 1999
- Genres: Real-time strategy, shooter
- Modes: Single-player, multiplayer

WARGASM (or War Ground Air Special Missions) is a 3D shooter / real-time strategy game developed by Digital Image Design and published by Infogrames. Originally named "EBT Tank", it was released for Microsoft Windows in 1998–1999.

== Gameplay ==
The game uses the 3Dream engine to process populated and varied battlefields, as well as relatively advanced graphical elements for its time of release. Acting as the commander of an army, the player of Wargasm directs the actions of AI friendly units via a simple control interface on a 2D overhead map, and if desired can take the perspective of, and directly control, any allied unit in the 3D real-time environment.

Playable characters available to the player are a regular infantryman, or a special forces soldier driving either a tank, an armored personnel carrier or a helicopter. The in-battle event of airstrikes are carried out by ground attack aircraft and stealth bombers, but cannot be controlled by the player.

== Plot ==
The game is set in the year 2065, and the world's military forces have been transferred to the World Wide War Web in an effort to eliminate the loss of actual human life. Every country, whether they be a superpower or in the Third World, have been represented accordingly. Wars are fought through this system, and the winner of each battle takes the loser's electronic infrastructure. However, the system is flawed, and is prone to hacking. In this state of "wargasm," the world has fallen into a state of corruption. It is the player's duty to bring order back to the world.

== Reception ==
Reception

Aggregate score
Aggregator	Score
GameRankings	71%

Review scores
Publication	Score
AllGame	3/5
CNET Gamecenter	4/10
Computer Games Strategy Plus	3.5/5
Computer Gaming World	3/5
Edge	6/10
Game Informer	5/10
GameSpot	7.3/10
IGN	7.8/10
Next Generation	2/5
PC Accelerator	6/10
PC Gamer (US)	54%
The Cincinnati Enquirer	2/4

The game received above-average reviews according to the review aggregation website GameRankings. Next Generation, however, said, "At the end of the day, Wargasm has a clever moniker that makes you take notice. But even that was stolen outright from a song by thrash girl band L7, and it's a shame the game doesn't live up to it."

At the 1999 edition of the Milia D’Or Awards in Cannes, Wargasm won in the "Action Game" category.

GameRevolution listed Wargasm as 14th on their list of the 50 Worst Game Names Ever.
