= EF2000 (video game) =

1995 video game

- European cover art
- Developer: Digital Image Design
- Publisher: Ocean Software
- Directors: Don Whiteford; Russell Payne
- Producers: Don Whiteford; Martin Kenwright
- Designers: Martin Kenwright; Shaun Hollywood
- Programmers: Steve Monks; Colin Bell
- Artists: Ian Boardman; Shaun Hollywood
- Platforms: MS-DOS, Windows
- Release: 1995: MS-DOS; 1996: Windows
- Genre: Combat flight simulator
- Modes: Single-player, multiplayer

EF2000 is a combat flight simulator video game developed by Digital Image Design (DID) and published by Ocean Software in 1995 for MS-DOS. It is the sequel to DID's earlier software title, TFX. An expansion pack, EF 2000: TACTCOM, was released in 1996. A compilation, EF 2000: Evolution, that included the main game and the expansion was released in 1996. An updated version, Super EF2000, was released exclusively for Windows 95 in 1996 in Europe. In 1997, a compilation titled EF2000 V2.0 was released in North America that included the original versions of EF2000 and TACTCOM and also the Windows exclusive Super EF2000. In June 1997, the graphics were boosted when DID released the "Graphics+" patch, which added Rendition Vérité hardware support and Glide API for 3dfx graphics card support to EF2000.

== Gameplay ==
EF2000 is a combat flight simulator of the Eurofighter Typhoon (EF2000) aircraft, featuring detailed terrain of the Baltic region. It supports virtual reality goggles. Graphics features included naturally irregular topography, clouds and darkening skies at high altitudes.

Gameplay consists of quick combat, simulator (free flight mode), training, multiplayer and campaign mode. The game featured a dynamic campaign simulating a campaign set in northern Europe. Missions require the player to evade ground-based and airborne defenses. Mid-air refueling is included.

MFDs allow player to attack both flying and grounded targets with a range of weapons, including precision-guided munitions, missiles and unguided bombs. Spot view allows for remote viewing of targets, enemies, friendly forces or the player's own EF2000. With padlock, the computer could lock onto a target and follow it around the cockpit even when the target maneuvers from in front of the player's aircraft.

== Reception ==
Reception

Review scores
Publication	Score
Next Generation	4/5
PC Gamer (US)	88%
Computer Game Review	86/81/87
PC Games	B

On release, a Next Generation critic called the game "one of the best flight sims on the market", applauding the realistically texture-mapped graphics, easy-to-learn interface, intelligently responsive AI, and multiplayer networking. Computer Game Review summarized it as "a good flight simulation overall".

EF2000 won Computer Gaming World's 1995 "Simulation of the Year" award. The editors praised it for combining "a high level of realism with fun", and noted its "ground-breaking terrain and aircraft graphics". In 1996, Computer Gaming World also ranked it as the 42nd best video game of all time for making combat simulation graphics, sound, and realism take "a flying leap forward." That same year, Next Generation ranked it as the 42nd top game of all time for being "simply the most immersive combat flight sim on the market." PC Gamer nominated EF2000 as the best simulation of 1995, although it lost to Apache. It was also the second-place finalist for Computer Game Review's 1995 "Simulation of the Year" award, which went to MechWarrior II.

Next Generation reviewed EF2000 V2.0, rating it four stars out of five, and stated that "All in all, EF2000 v2.0 is a solid update to an already good title. The only real drawback to the game is the fact that you really do need a 3D card to play the game the way it should be played. Aside from that, EF2000 v2.0 is an excellent choice for anyone interested in a little aerial combat."

In 1996, Computer Gaming World declared EF2000 the 60th-best computer game of all time. It was named the eighth-best computer game ever by PC Gamer UK in 1997. The editors called it "the best flight of all time". In 1998, PC Gamer declared EF2000 V2.0 the 31st-best computer game ever released, and the editors called it "a believable simulation of a very sexy next-century fighter".

== Legacy ==
DID Simulations followed up with games based on the F-22 - first with F-22: Air Dominance Fighter and F-22 Total Air War.

The EF2000 series came to an end in 2001 when Rage Games Limited released Eurofighter Typhoon. It was developed from the makers of EF2000 and has the Digital Image Design label on the box.
