= Starship Group =

- Company type: Software developer
- Industry: Interactive Entertainment
- Founded: May 2013
- Founder: Martin Kenwright
- Headquarters: Liverpool, Merseyside, United Kingdom
- Key people: Martin Kenwright CEO, Clemens Wangerin MD
- Number of employees: 25
- Website: Official Site

Starship Group is a British digital media, entertainment and technology company based in Liverpool, UK. The development studio, based in the city's Baltic Triangle area, specialises in creating next-generation original content across the games, entertainment, lifestyle, virtual reality and e-health sectors. The studio is an umbrella company housing several smaller studios each currently developing original content.

Founded by Evolution Studios and Digital Image Design founder Martin Kenwright, the studio was established in 2013.

Gathering together talent from renowned studios such as the now defunct Studio Liverpool and Bizarre Creations, including former director of Studio Liverpool Clemens Wangerin, alongside founding members from Evolution Studios, the founding team have collectively devised or delivered more than 69 games including PlayStation launch titles and AAA franchises such as MotorStorm, WipEout, Project Gotham Racing, Blur, James Bond 007: Blood Stone, Formula 1 and World Rally Championship.

The studio launched to the wider world on 26 March 2014.

Starship announced first details of their first products CyberCook, Playworld and Forget-Me-Not in May, 2014.

Children's mobile adventure Playworld Superheroes launched on iOS on 29 January 2015.

The studio released Samsung Gear VR exclusive CyberCook Taster, a demo of the world's first VR hyper-real cooking simulation, on 26 February 2015.
