= Martin Kenwright =

British video game designer

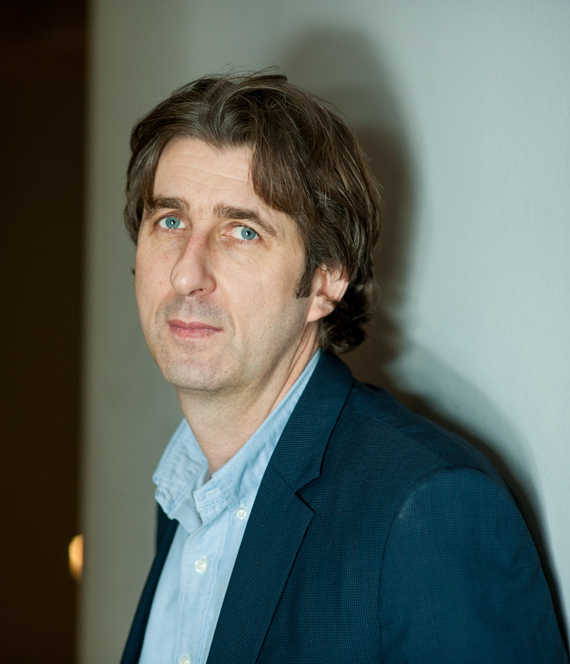
- Born: Liverpool, England, UK
- Years active: 1987–present

Martin Kenwright is a British video game designer and the founder of British-based virtual and augmented reality innovation company vTime Limited, digital media, entertainment and technology company Starship, and video game development studios Digital Image Design (DID) and Evolution Studios. He created seminal computer games such as F29 Retaliator and EF2000. He is also responsible for the World Rally Championship franchise and PlayStation 3 launch title, MotorStorm, along with its respective franchise.

== Early life ==
Kenwright began life in the video game industry as a 2D graphics artist and game designer in 1987, working at Rowan Software on games such as Falcon and Tetris straight after leaving Widnes Sixth Form College in Cheshire.

== Digital Image Design ==
Kenwright founded Digital Image Design (DID) in 1989 with Philip Allsopp in Runcorn, Cheshire. The studio specialised in flight simulation titles, with military using the technology from EF2000 as a training tool. His original IP, F-22, won the "Milia D'Or" for 'Best Game' and 'Best Flight Simulator' in 1997. Wargasm won the "Milia D’Or" for Best Action Game in 1998.

The studio broke new ground with the world's first 3D accelerated game in EF2000 and the world's first Pentium accelerated game with Wargasm.

The studio was acquired by Ocean Software in 1998, who became Infogrames in 1999.

== Evolution Studios ==
Kenwright went on to form Evolution Studios with Psygnosis founder, Ian Hetherington as chairman. The fledgling company was immediately enlisted as Sony Computer Entertainment's first European external development team. Evolution were subsequently handed the World Rally Championship video game licence, the first official FIA licensed World Rally Championship game in the series for the PlayStation 2 using official drivers, cars and tracks from the 2001 season.

The franchise earned two BAFTA nominations for WRC II Extreme in 2003 and one BAFTA nomination in 2004 for WRC 4.

The success of the WRC franchise gave Kenwright the freedom to work on original IP in the form of MotorStorm, a PS3 exclusive launch title. The title was a global number one and earned two British Academy of Arts (BAFTA) nominations. The MotorStorm franchise spawned four more titles, including the BAFTA nominated MotorStorm: Pacific Rift.

Both Evolution and Bigbig Studios were acquired by Sony Computer Entertainment in September 2007. Kenwright left the company, embarking on a five-year enforced sabbatical.

== BigBig Studios ==
Kenwright was also a major shareholder in Evolution's satellite studio, BigBig Studios, based in Warwickshire. BigBig developed titles such as the critically acclaimed Pursuit Force series and Motorstorm: Arctic Edge.

== Starship Group ==
Kenwright returned to the industry in 2013, announcing new digital entertainment studio Starship in March 2014. Developing original content across the VR, games, entertainment and lifestyle sectors, Kenwright announced details of the studio's first products, CyberCook and Playworld in May 2014.

With Kenwright as CEO, Starship unveiled Playworld Superheroes in January 2015 and released VR demo CyberCook Taster on the Gear VR in February, 2015.

== vTime Limited ==
Kenwright announced new product vTime in August 2015, before launching the virtual reality social network on Samsung Gear VR on 22 December 2015. vTime Limited was established as a standalone venture in April 2016 with Kenwright as CEO, having been housed previously under the umbrella of parent company Starship Group.

In April 2018, Kenwright announced that vTime Limited had raised $7.6 million (£5.4 million) in a series A funding round and announced plans for the studio to release a social augmented reality experience later in 2018.

== Personal life ==
Kenwright appeared in The Times Tech Track 100 in 2005 and 2006, and in IGN's Next Generation Hot 100 Developers in 2007.
