= The Great Escape (1986 video game) =

- Developer: Denton Designs
- Publisher: Ocean Software
- Programmer: Trevor Inns (C64)
- Platforms: Amstrad CPC, Commodore 64, MS-DOS, ZX Spectrum
- Release: 1986
- Genre: Action-adventure
- Mode: Single-player

The Great Escape is an action-adventure video game which shares a title and similar plot to the film The Great Escape. It was developed by Denton Designs, which went on to produce the similarly acclaimed Where Time Stood Still. The Great Escape was published by Ocean Software in 1986 for the ZX Spectrum, Commodore 64, and MS-DOS. Trevor Inns programmed the Commodore 64 version.

== Plot ==
The player controls an unnamed prisoner of war who has been interned in a POW camp somewhere in northern Germany in 1942. The camp itself is a small castle on a promontory surrounded on three sides by cliffs and the cold North Sea. The only entry to the camp is by a narrow road through the gatehouse and anyone passing through this must be carrying the correct papers. Everywhere else in the camp is surrounded by fences or walls with guard dogs used to patrol the perimeter and guards in observation towers with searchlights posted to watch for any prisoners trying to escape. Beneath the camp, there is also a maze of tunnels and drains, although these are dangerous to enter without some kind of light. The player's task is to escape from the camp. There are a number of different ways that this can be achieved.

== Gameplay ==
The environment is displayed in isometric 2.5D with the player's character initially in bed at the beginning of a day in the camp. The prisoner has a daily routine, along with all the other prisoners, which includes roll call, exercising, mealtimes and bedtime. The other prisoners will follow this routine and, if the player does not control the main character for a short period of time, their character will join in the routine. There are soldiers guarding the camp and they will apprehend the player if he is seen out of routine (prison guards only arrest on touch and only detect prisoners in their line of sight or indoors).

== Reception ==
Reception

Award
Publication	Award
Crash	Smash

The ZX Spectrum version of The Great Escape was placed at number 23 in the Your Sinclair official top 100, after originally being scored 9 out of 10, and a Megagame award in that magazine's January 1987 issue. Both the tense atmosphere and the protagonist's 'automatic daily routine' were highlighted as excellent features.

The game won the awards for best arcade adventure and best advert of the year according to the readers of Crash, as well as being the runner up for best game, and was also nominated in other categories, including best graphics.

== See also ==
- The Abbey of Crime
