= Brataccas =

1986 video game

- Cover art by Roger Dean
- Developer: Psygnosis
- Publishers: EU: Psygnosis; NA: Mindscape
- Platforms: Amiga, Atari ST, Mac OS
- Release: Amiga, Atari ST: EU: January 1986; NA: Early 1986; Mac OS: EU: January 1986; NA: February 1986
- Genre: Action-adventure
- Mode: Single-player

Brataccas is a 1986 action-adventure game developed and published by Psygnosis for the Amiga, Atari ST, and Macintosh. It was the first title published by the company, and was built on the remains of the much-hyped vaporware project Bandersnatch, which was partially developed by Imagine Software. The storied tale of the game's development led to close press attention in the UK computer market. When Brataccas finally shipped, this attention resulted in considerable coverage in the computer press. However, the game was generally reviewed poorly due to its significant control problems, although the graphics were widely praised.

== Plot ==
The player controls Kyne, a genetic engineer who has developed technology for creating supermen. The oppressive government of the day desires this research to create a breed of supersoldier, but Kyne refuses to assist. In retaliation, the government frames him for treason, claiming that he is seeking to sell his work to the underworld. At the same time, the government secretly offers a reward to anyone in the underworld who turns Kyne over to them. With both the forces of law and lawlessness aligned against him, Kyne is forced to flee Earth.

During his escape, Kyne learns that evidence needed to clear his name can be found on the distant asteroid of Brataccas. Brataccas, first of the asteroids to be colonized, is a backwater mining colony with a "wild west" feel of lawlessness and corruption. Kyne has to find the evidence in order to win the game, obtaining it from the in-game characters. The manual gave no indication of who held the evidence, suggesting that everyone was equally corrupt and dangerous to talk to.

== Gameplay ==
Kyne, with the red helmet, moves between rooms via doors. The caption on the left shows his current location in Calypso Lift. Calypso Bar is through the door. The computer character is saying, "I will kill you."

Brataccas displays the game world in flip-screen format, with the map divided into rooms that are drawn into the display as the character moved through the habitat. The screens flip when Kyne passes from room to room, typically through doors. Most movement is horizontal, with automatic elevators providing vertical movement between floors where required. Occasionally, labeled doors in the rear wall or teleportation booths with the appearance of cylindrical shower stalls lead the player to different sets of rooms. A small number of rooms are outdoor areas.

The player can move, pickup and drop objects, and talk to non-player characters (NPCs). These NPCs pursue their own objectives, sometimes even engaging in combat with other NPCs. All of the game's characters use swords in combat.

Interaction between characters is carried out through dialog bubbles. The player can only respond to statements, at which point a menu of possible responses appears. The selections are fairly limited, and the outcomes often seemingly random. Additionally, a number of loudspeakers located in some rooms announce events, like fights breaking out. If more than two characters are talking the screen can fill with dialog bubbles, rendering most of them unreadable.

The control system is an early example of a gesture-based interface. The mouse is moved in the direction the player wants to walk, and the speed of the motion of the mouse controls how fast the character moves – flicking it causes Kyne to run.

Interaction with objects is limited to picking them up and dropping them, at which point other characters might interact with them as well. For instance, one can buy information by dropping money, bags of which are scattered around the world. If Kyne falls from one level to another, he drops whatever he was holding, and another character might pick it up.

== Development ==
Teaser advert for Bandersnatch which appeared in many computer game magazines around 1984

Brataccas had its origins in Bandersnatch, one of two ambitious "Megagames" planned by Imagine Software, the other being Psyclapse. Bandersnatch was eagerly anticipated by teaser adverts placed in the computer press in 1984, and was originally intended for release on the 8-bit ZX Spectrum home computer; it also would have set a new price point for computer games (£39.95 vs. the standard rates of the time of between £5.95 and £11.95). It was intended that the game would have required a cartridge or dongle to support the demands of the game. However, before any of the Megagames had been completed, Imagine Software went bankrupt, owing to financial mismanagement, with the spectacular demise being shown in a BBC documentary named Commercial Breaks.

Finchspeed, a company created by former Imagine directors Ian Hetherington, Mark Butler, and Dave Lawson, attempted to acquire the assets of the failing company, but were unsuccessful; the rights to the games were sold by the receivers.

In October 1984, Sinclair Research paid a rumoured £100,000 for the rights to Bandersnatch and contracted Fire Iron, a new company set up by Hetherington and Lawson, to produce the game for the Sinclair QL for release in early 1985. Sinclair withdrew funding in 1985 when the QL version never appeared, and the directors then formed Psygnosis, with their first title Brataccas introduced at the 1985 Personal Computer World show. It featured many of the concepts originally intended for Bandersnatch, and was released on the Atari ST, Amiga, and Macintosh in January 1986. Several ideas intended for the game ended up being used in Denton Designs' (a company formed by ex-Imagine employees) games Frankie Goes to Hollywood, Shadowfire and Enigma Force.

On the Amiga and Atari ST, the game runs in 4-color, 640 × 200 resolution, a high resolution mode little used for games. On the Atari ST, it was one of few games to support the monochrome 640 × 400 high resolution which required Atari's monochrome monitor. The Mac version uses unchanged graphics from color versions, and runs inside a small, vertically compressed area in the center of the monitor. The box art for Brataccas was drawn by fantasy artist Roger Dean, who would provide artwork for many Psygnosis titles. It was later used as the album cover for Uriah Heep's 2001 album Remasters: The Official Anthology.

== Reception ==
Long expected, and already the subject of considerable pre-release press, the game received mixed reviews. Reviewers generally liked its sophisticated setting and story and ambitious graphics, but almost all complained about the control system.

Commodore Horizons started its Amiga review by noting that the concept appeared excellent but the early implementation they received was difficult to enjoy. They were highly critical of the mouse controls, noting that even slight movements like re-positioning the mouse on the desk could be interpreted as commands that would have consequences. But they reserved their primary complaints for the manual, and noted that after playing it for some time they still had no idea how to win the game.

Antic's review of the Atari ST version was similar, noting that "The authors say their interface 'implies action,' which means that the game tries to sense what you want to do and will proceed to do it for you. Most of the time for me, it meant running into walls at full speed." The reviewer added, "Controlling Kyne reliably ... in a critical situation is nearly impossible." The review concluded that "for all its impressive graphics and hi-tech, Blade Runner plotline, I really can't say Brataccas is one of my favorites", and "On a scale of 1 to 10 I would have to give it a 5."

Compute! expressed similar concerns, stating "Usually, your character behaves in a predictable fashion, but it can be frustrating to see him run and crash into a wall when you were merely trying to rotate to face a door." Then go on to state that "The only negative factors arise not from the game concept, but from its implementation." They conclude, in a section titled "Unrealized Potential", that the game's primary advance is to demonstrate what sort of games might be expected on the platforms in the future.

In contrast, ANALOG magazine's first ST-Log edition reviewed the game favourably. Although it touches on the control problems, it passes these off as an issue of having too many possible options. It concludes, "Psygnosis should be congratulated on a fine effort... What can I say? Buy it." A similar note was offered by Popular Computing Weekly, who called it "very good indeed" and rated it 4 out of 5.

== Legacy ==
The Black Mirror interactive film Bandersnatch, released in 2018, alludes to Imagine Software and the failed work to produce Bandersnatch. The film starts on 9 July 1984, the date of Imagine's closure, and includes a shot of the cover of Crash reporting on the closure. Within the film, the fictional software company Tuckersoft, which had developed both Commodore 64 and ZX Spectrum games, places its financial future on the attempt to produce Bandersnatch, and in some scenarios falls into bankruptcy after the game fails to appear.
