= The Transformers (1985 video game) =

Video game based on Transformers franchise

- Developer: Denton Designs
- Publisher: Ocean Software
- Platforms: Sinclair Spectrum, Commodore 64
- Release: 1985
- Genres: Platform, shoot 'em up
- Mode: Single player

The Transformers is a platform shoot 'em up game based on the Transformers franchise. It was written by Denton Designs and released by Ocean Software for the Sinclair Spectrum and Commodore 64 home computers in 1985.

== Gameplay ==
In the game, the Autobots are searching for four parts of an energon cube which have been scattered around a city, which consists of a number of platforms and ladders. The Decepticons are also seeking the energon cube, and will destroy the Autobots in order to retrieve it.

The player controls five Autobots: Optimus Prime, Hound, Jazz, Mirage and Bumblebee, one at a time. When not in use, the Autobots hide in Defensa-Pods; while inside these pods they cannot be harmed, and slowly recharge their energy. The Decepticons are represented by Megatron, Soundwave, Starscream, Buzzsaw, Skywarp, Laserbeak, Ravage, Frenzy and Rumble. The Decepticons can regenerate and do not transform.

Each Autobot has three attributes (Shields, Power and Weapons) with each character having them in different distributions (Optimus Prime has a high Power rating, average Shields and low Weapons, while Mirage has a high Weapons rating but lower Power and Shields).

Each character can transform between their vehicle and robot forms by facing forward and pressing the fire button. Unlike the cartoon, all the Autobots can fly while in robot form, although they travel faster by using their vehicle modes. Driving off the end of platforms or into stationary objects will cause the character to die.

== Reception ==
Reception

Review scores
Publication	Score
Crash	60%
Computer and Video Games	26/40
Sinclair User	4/5
Your Sinclair	6/10
Computer Gamer	13/20

The Commodore 64 version of The Transformers entered the Gallup All Formats Top 20 chart at #17 (#10 in the Commodore 64 chart), in late 1985, peaking at #9 a few weeks later.

The game's received mixed reviews - Sinclair User gave the game 4 stars out of five, while Your Sinclair gave it 6/10 and Crash gave it 60%. Max Phillips from Your Sinclair said the game was "slick but nothing new, the keyboard controls are awful and the cassette inlay is diabolical" while John Gilbert of Sinclair User said "Transformers is a game where a high score is all-important, and I am sure that once you have found the energy cube you will still enjoy a scrap with the Decepticons".

When asked, in an interview with Julian Rignall of Crash, which of their games they were least pleased with, Ally Noble, one of the developers of The Transformers admitted that it was "definitely Transformers... it's really a personal thing, we all like different products, but I think Transformers was an embarrassment".
