= Fighters Destiny =

1998 video game

- North American cover art
- Developers: Genki; Opus Corp. Anchor Inc.
- Publishers: JP: Imagineer; NA: Ocean of America; EU: Infogrames United Kingdom (Note: Released under the Ocean brand name.)
- Directors: Masahiro Uramoto, Manami Kuroda
- Producer: Kōichirō Sakurai
- Designer: Masahiro Onoguchi
- Programmers: Kazuhiko Hamaguchi, Takaya Nakamura, Hiroki Fujishiro
- Composers: Hideya Nagata, Makoto Asai, Kenichi Sakata
- Platform: Nintendo 64
- Release: NA: January 26, 1998; EU: March 1, 1998; JP: December 11, 1998
- Genre: Fighting
- Modes: Single-player, multiplayer

Fighters Destiny, known in Japan as Fighting Cup, is a 1998 video game developed by Genki alongside Opus Corp and Anchor Inc for the Nintendo 64. It closely models the 3D fighting game standards of the time but integrates a unique point scoring system. The game's generic characters and unoriginal presentation have been panned by critics, but reviewers praised its point system and consider it to be one of the best fighting games on the Nintendo 64. It was followed by a sequel, Fighter Destiny 2, released in 2000.

== Gameplay ==
Gameplay screenshot

In Fighters Destiny, the player controls a polygon-based character in a three dimensional battle arena. The game features typical hand to hand combat fighting: using a variety of punches, kicks, locks, and throws, players attempt to pummel their opponents into submission. Each character also has a large list of special commands (called "moves") that can be accessed during battle. These different moves range from simply pressing the "B" button to inputting button combinations.

In most fighting games, the objective is to deplete the opponent's health gauge. Fighters Destiny follows the same concept but also relies on a customizable point scoring system to determine the winner. These points, which are displayed as yellow stars under the character's health gauge, can be earned in a variety of ways. By default, knocking the character off the fighting platform (a "Ring Out") is worth one point, taking down an opponent with a throw nets the player two points, while a typical K.O. is worth three points, as well as taking the opponent down with a counterattack, and executing a "special" is worth four points. Finally, if the adjustable time counter runs out, then the winner is awarded one point by virtue of judge's decision. By default setting, the first fighter to score seven points wins the match.

K.O.'s can be achieved with instant-K.O. hits (referred to as "1-shot") or counterattack moves, or can be executed with a finishing blow when the player's opponent is in "Piyori condition", a brief spell of dizziness in which opponent's life bar has been drained completely and the fighter is allowed only limited control. "Specials" can only be executed when the opponent is in Piyori condition. If players are able to survive until Piyori condition passes, their health gauge refills completely. The health bar also refills continuously (albeit slowly) throughout the fight.

Fighters Destiny offers five different gameplay modes. By playing the traditional versus computer mode, players can earn a new character (Boro) and learn new skills for their character. They can also select to fight against a second player, challenge their skills and gain new characters in "Record Attack", play through the "Master Challenge" to expand their character's command list, and train against a robot character. When players learn new skills playing the computer or the Master Challenge, they can save their character's expanded command list to the Controller Pak; afterwards, the new command list can be accessed in any mode to aid the player.

== Characters ==
There are nine regular characters in Fighters Destiny: Ryuji, a Japanese karate exponent; Abdul, a well-balanced fighter from Mongolia obsessed with Arabic culture; Tomahawk, a professional wrestler from the United States; Meiling, a Chinese martial artist; Ninja, a Japanese ninja with a massive catalog of special moves; Pierre, a French clown with a deceptive fighting style; Leon, an all-rounder from Spain; Bob, a powerful Brazilian fighter; and the tough aerial combat specialist Valerie from Germany.

In addition to the standard nine characters, there are five secret characters that can be unlocked by completing various challenge modes, with the secret characters themselves consisting of a quick and powerful female Swiss warrior named Boro, a Russian jester-esque fighter named Joker, a training robot from Germany named Robert, an old Japanese karate expert named the Master, and a comical fighting cow from Hokkaido named Ushi.

== Development ==
Fighters Destiny was initially announced under the title "Struggle Hard". The voice of the announcer, Fighting D.J., was provided by Marc Silk in the English version.

== Reception and sales ==
Fighters Destiny

Aggregate score
Aggregator	Score
GameRankings	77%

Review scores
Publication	Score
AllGame	3/5
Edge	8/10
Electronic Gaming Monthly	7/10, 6/10, 7.5/10, 6/10
Famitsu	29/40
Game Informer	8/10
GameFan	78%
GameSpot	7.8/10
Hyper	86%
IGN	8/10
N64 Magazine	86%
Next Generation	4/5
Nintendo Power	7.3/10

As with Mace: The Dark Age just a few months earlier, critics widely deemed Fighters Destiny the best fighting game on the Nintendo 64 to date, while noting that this was largely because the others were uniformly weak. However, while most critics described Mace as simply the best of a mediocre set, Fighters Destiny was more commonly referred to as the first genuinely worthwhile fighting game for the Nintendo 64. Jeff Gerstmann wrote in GameSpot, "The unique scoring system and variety of modes make Fighters Destiny a winner. It may not have the best characters or the best graphics, but it's a well-rounded game, which is more than I can say about any other N64 fighting game." Similarly, IGN's Peer Schneider concluded, "Some minor problems in presentation and overall player balance keep Fighter's Destiny from getting a perfect score, but this is—no doubt—the most original fighting game in years. It doesn't quite live up to the best of the best (like Virtua Fighter III or Tekken 2), but it beats the living daylights out of every other N64 fighter ever released." The review team for Electronic Gaming Monthly were more uncertain, with Crispin Boyer and Chris Johnston in particular saying that the game is decent but flawed and lacks a genuinely revolutionary touch to make it stand out.

The scoring system was commonly cited as both the game's best feature and the one which most sets it apart from other fighting games. Critics also widely praised the ability to learn new moves and save them to Controller Pak in the Master Challenge, and the numerous modes and options in general. A few also found the variety of possible fighting styles an important aspect; GamePro commented that "You can do multi-hit combos, throws, counters, and juggles as in most fighting games, but you can also execute lock moves and holds like in a wrestling game. This spectrum of action puts Fighters Destiny in a league of its own."

The graphics were generally seen as the game's weakest aspect, though still respectable. Several critics commented that the character designs are uninspired and suffer from low polygon counts and visible seams in their textures. Gerstmann defended the character design, stating that it "isn't original by any means, but it works very well." Other graphical shortcomings cited in reviews included slowdown and flat, non-interactive backgrounds.

Dan Hsu of Electronic Gaming Monthly criticized the use of just two attack buttons for all the moves, saying this tends to reduce the game to a button-mashing contest. Contrarily, Schneider and Next Generation praised this configuration, stating that it still allows a wide variety of moves, and makes it unnecessary to use the Nintendo 64 controller's C button, which they found awkward to use in fighting games.

Fighters Destiny held a 77% on the review aggregation website GameRankings at the time of the site's 2019 closure, based on 12 reviews. Next Generation called it "the best fighter on Nintendo 64. Mastering the fighting techniques of each character is a challenge, and the depth of the single-player game is impressive. Until the arrival of Tekken 3 for PlayStation, Fighters Destiny is the fighting game to play."

=== Commercial ===
The game missed its initial Christmas release date and was greeted with lukewarm sales figures, selling only 18,000 copies in the first two months after its North American release. In an effort to boost sales, Infogrames Entertainment (the parent company of Fighters Destiny international distributor Ocean Software) shaved US$20 off the price tag, dropping the game's price to US$49.99.

== Sequel ==
Fighter Destiny 2
- Developers: Genki; Opus Corp.
- Publishers: JP: Imagineer; NA: SouthPeak Interactive
- Platform: Nintendo 64
- Release: JP: August 27, 1999; NA: June 22, 2000
- Genre: Fighting
- Modes: Single-player, multiplayer

A sequel to Fighters Destiny, titled Fighter Destiny 2 (dropping the plural form of the first word) and known in Japan as Kakutō Denshō: F-Cup Maniax (格闘伝承 ~F-Cup Maniax~, Kakutō Denshō ~F-Kappu Mēniakkusu~; lit. "Fighting Tradition: F-Cup Maniax"), was released in 1999-2000. Some of the characters make a second appearance in the sequel, but the majority of the cast is all new. Although the game mechanics remain unchanged, a "Fighter's Arena" mode has been added, a giant board game that allows players to build up their characters' attributes in addition to having them learn new fighting skills.

There are eleven default characters in Fighter Destiny 2. Ryuji makes a return, now mainly referred to by his surname Saeki, while Abdul, Meiling, Ninja, and Pierre appear with their original names. There are several new characters added, but most are direct replacements of previous characters and retain almost all of their moves. The newcomers are Brazilian samba dancer Adriana (replacing Valerie), Italian mad scientist Federico (replacing Leon), American pro wrestler D-Dog (replacing Bob), British fashion model Kate (replacing Boro), German cyborg Ziege (replacing Tomahawk), and British punk rocker Dixon, who is a new original character with a unique moveset.

Like in the first game, there are five secret characters to unlock from within the various game modes, consisting of new addition Fabien, a French nobleman; Mou, an anthropomorphic cow (replacing Ushi); Samurai, a Japanese training robot (replacing Robert); Master, who returns from the original game, and an American drag queen named Cherry (replacing Joker), whose voice was altered to sound more feminine in the US release.

=== Reception ===
Fighter Destiny 2

Aggregate score
Aggregator	Score
Metacritic	54/100

Review scores
Publication	Score
Electronic Gaming Monthly	3/10
Famitsu	30/40
Game Informer	2/10
GameFan	53%
GameRevolution	D
GameSpot	5.8/10
IGN	6.3/10
N64 Magazine	85%
Nintendo Power	7.5/10

Fighter Destiny 2 received more mediocre reviews than the original Fighters Destiny according to Metacritic. In Japan, however, Famitsu gave it a score of 30 out of 40. Nintendo Power gave it a favorable review, over four months before the game was released Stateside.
