= Where Time Stood Still =

1988 video game

- Developer: Denton Designs
- Publisher: Ocean Software
- Platforms: Sinclair Spectrum 128K, MS-DOS, Atari ST
- Release: 1988
- Genre: Action-adventure
- Mode: Single-player

Where Time Stood Still is an isometric action-adventure game released by Ocean in 1988 for the Sinclair Spectrum 128K, MS-DOS, and Atari ST. The game was developed by Denton Designs as a follow-up to The Great Escape from 1986.

== Plot ==
A plane has crashed in a remote and unknown plateau of the Himalayas. To their horror, the survivors soon discover that it is populated by dangerous prehistoric creatures and tribes.

The player must guide the party of four survivors - the pilot, Jarret, and his three passengers - to safety, avoiding dinosaurs, cannibals and natural dangers, while also ensuring they are sufficiently rested and fed during the long and difficult journey.

== Gameplay ==
The player initially controls Jarret, the leader of the party. The other survivors are Clive, a wealthy businessman; Gloria, his daughter; and Dirk, her fiancé. Each member of the party may be controlled by the player or by the game and they all have differing personalities and abilities. For example, Clive is overweight, tires easily, and is always hungry. Dirk is athletic and has some knowledge of the local languages; he is reluctant to leave Gloria, and will become despondent if she dies. Useful objects are scattered about the map, which should be carefully explored.

The graphics are rendered in isometric 3D projection.

A simple menu and cursor system is used to select members and manipulate objects. Computer-controlled characters will complain if they are injured, tired or hungry. It is up to the player to decide what action to take in response. Indulge them too often, and food and time will run short. Ignore them, and they will abandon you and try to make their own way to safety.

== Development ==
The working title for the game during development was "Tibet"

== Ports ==
The Atari ST and ZX Spectrum versions are monochrome while the MS-DOS version uses four-color CGA. The MS-DOS version has no music, with sounds limited to PC speaker beeps and clicks.

== Reception ==
Reception

Awards
Publication	Award
Crash	Crash Smash
Sinclair User	SU Classic
Your Sinclair	Megagame

Where Time Stood Still was highly rated by most magazines of the time, with Crash, Sinclair User and Your Sinclair all awarding the game their top honours. Sinclair User said "prepare to play the most exciting game you've ever seen on the Spectrum", Your Sinclair called it a "superb arcade adventure" and Crash decided it was "one of the most absorbing games ever - it's a classic!" ACE was less enthusiastic, rating the game 719/1000, saying that while the game "will take you a long time [to complete] and give you a lot of fun", they had concerns over the long-term replay value - "once you have completed it though, it's doubtful you'll play it again", and were critical of the isometric viewpoint, declaring it both "confusing" and under some circumstances, "annoying".

== Legacy ==
Fan-made ports were released for the Amiga in July 2014 and CD32 in December 2014. They were converted from the Atari ST with enhancements not present in other versions.
