= Bounces (video game) =

1985 video game

- Developer: Denton Designs
- Publisher: Beyond Software
- Platforms: Commodore 64, ZX Spectrum
- Release: 1985
- Genres: Fighting, sports
- Modes: Single-player, multiplayer

Bounces is a 1985 sports/fighting game released for the Commodore 64 and ZX Spectrum.

Points are scored by catching and throwing the bouncing ball into a goal, or by knocking the opponent out with the ball or hand-to-hand combat. Each contestant is hampered by being attached to the wall by a length of elastic.
