= Last Rights =

Last Rights may refer to:

- Last Rights (album), a 1992 album by Canadian industrial band Skinny Puppy
- Last Rights (TV series), a 2005 British television serial

== See also ==
- Last Rites (disambiguation)
