= Edward O. Thorp's Real Blackjack =

1990 video game

- Developer: Villa Crespo Software
- Publisher: Villa Crespo Software
- Platform: MS-DOS
- Release: 1990

Edward O. Thorp's Real Blackjack is a video game published in 1990 by Villa Crespo Software for MS-DOS.

== Gameplay ==
Edward O. Thorp's Real Blackjack is a game in which Edward O. Thorp serves as the player's expert guide in learning how to play blackjack better.

== Reception ==
Michael S. Lasky reviewed the game for Computer Gaming World, and stated that "It is singularly one of the best casino game/tutorials available today."

Harry Bee for Compute! said the game "doesn't look as slick or play as simply as card games that focus on entertainment. It's substantial enough to take as lightly or seriously as you like."
