= Eurofighter Typhoon (video game) =

2001 video game

- Developer: Digital Image Design
- Publishers: EU: Rage Software; NA: Take-Two Interactive
- Director: Don Whiteford
- Programmer: Robin Anderson
- Composer: Buster Field
- Platform: Microsoft Windows
- Release: EU: May 4, 2001; NA: July 24, 2001
- Genre: Flight simulation
- Mode: Single-player

Eurofighter Typhoon is a combat flight simulator published by Rage Software in 2001. The game models the jet fighter Eurofighter Typhoon. Digital Image Design was in process of developing the game as successor to F-22 Total Air War when the company was bought by Rage Software. An extended version of the game with an additional campaign, Eurofighter Typhoon: Operation Icebreaker, was released in 2002.

== Gameplay ==
The story of the game posits Russia quickly invading the eastern countries of Europe. Iceland is the next one on the list, as NATO has abandoned the country in an attempt to protect the Western countries of Europe. The ICEFOR is outnumbered, but is able to deploy a small number of the new Eurofighter Typhoon aircraft to turn the tide of the war. The game also features a very extensive virtual battleground over Iceland, one of the most advanced of its time. A dynamic camera enables the player to watch the war in real-time. As the war unfolds, news will be delivered by an in-game newspaper.

The game allows the player to take over the destiny of six pilots. Each one will be assigned different missions depending on their abilities such as bombing, interception, and Wild Weasel, with several of these missions even going on at the same time. The player can switch at any time between pilots, taking charge of the most critical and dangerous tasks of the mission, and leaving the AI to perform the others. As the war goes on, each pilot can be injured, lost behind enemy lines after an unlucky ejection and waiting for rescue, or taken prisoner, and can even be interrogated by the Russians.

== Reception ==
Reception

Aggregate score
Aggregator	Score
Metacritic	69/100

Review scores
Publication	Score
4Players	86%
Computer Games Magazine	2.5/5
Computer Gaming World	2.5/5
GameSpot	6.6/10
GameSpy	82%
GameZone	9/10
IGN	8.3/10
Jeuxvideo.com	13/20
Next Generation	4/5
PC Zone	85%

The game received "average" reviews according to the review aggregation website Metacritic. Kevin Rice of NextGen said of the game, "An incredible sense of speed combined with an intuitive interface makes for an addictive flight sim."
