= Eco (1987 video game) =

1987 video game

- Developer(s): Denton Designs
- Publisher(s): Ocean Software
- Platform(s): Amiga, Atari ST
- Release: 1987
- Genre(s): Life simulation
- Mode(s): Single-player

Eco is a wire-frame 3D evolution life simulation game developed by Denton Designs for the Amiga and Atari ST. It was released in 1987 and published by Ocean Software.

The player uses a mouse or joystick to control an insect, which must avoid predators, find food, and then find another insect of the same species and mate with it. The player can then unlock one of several "genes", altering the value of which changes their creature. Some changes are only cosmetic and leave the creature in the same species; others can, for instance, make the initial insect a new species with wings and capable of flight. After unlocking multiple genes the player can become a fast dog-like quadruped, a bird, a scorpion or a humanoid. The game does not end until the player starves, is killed by another creature, or deliberately "evolves" into a plant.
