= VTime XR =

Virtual reality and augmented reality social network

vTime XR
- Release: December, 2015
- Platform: Windows Mixed Reality, Samsung Gear VR, Google Cardboard, Google Daydream, iOS, Oculus Rift, Oculus Go
- Type: Social software
- Website: vtime.net

vTime XR was a free-to-play virtual reality and augmented reality social network created by British virtual and augmented reality innovation company vTime Limited, developed in Liverpool in the UK. Cross platform, the app allows groups of up to four users to "jump into VR or AR and talk in what is essentially a private chat room. Users can customize an avatar and select a 3D environment to host the chat inside".

Launching on Gear VR in December 2015, vTime was the first virtual reality social network on a mobile platform. The app became the first social network to launch on Google Cardboard in March 2016, and on Google Daydream in January 2017. vTime was also the first virtual reality application to give its users the ability to socialise inside their own 360 images, and was later a launch title for the Windows Mixed Reality platform in October 2017.

In February 2019, vTime became the first cross reality (XR) social network after adding AR mode. The update gives users the ability to meet and chat with people in a shared virtual space using AR, VR, or 2D Magic Window mode.

== Experience ==
"vTime likes to think of itself as a “sociable” network, rather than a social network, perhaps emphasising that these virtual social gatherings are essentially friendly and more genteel in nature than some of their counterparts". The network focuses on facilitating shared conversations in virtual reality, though users without a VR headset are able to join sessions via 'Magic Window' mode on Android and iOS phones. Cross platform, all user avatars support audio lip-syncing and avatar eye-tracking, and can use the network's library of virtual emojis 'vMotes' allowing "users to express themselves in numerous ways". Users on high-end headsets can use platform controllers to add hand and body tracking to their sessions

== Funding ==
In April 2018, the vTime Limited announced that it had raised $7.6 million (£5.4 million) in a series A funding round to accelerate development of the app.
