= Last Rites (video game) =

1997 video game

- Developer: Ocean Software
- Publisher: Ocean Software
- Platform: DOS
- Release: 1997
- Genre: First-person shooter
- Modes: Single-player, multiplayer

Last Rites is a 1997 video game developed and published by Ocean Software for DOS. It is a first-person shooter in which players exterminate a horde of zombies from a city. The game was developed shortly after Ocean Software was acquired by Infogrames, whilst retaining its development team. Upon release, Last Rites received negative reviews, with critics faulting the graphics of the game, which were seen as dated by the time of release, although some found the gameplay enjoyable.

== Gameplay ==
Gameplay screenshot

The player is the head of a squad of soldiers tasked with liberating the world from a global infestation of zombies by exterminating them from cities. Leading the squad with three other non-player character team members, players undertake 11 missions with varied objectives, such as to locate and destroy zombies, destroy certain targets, escort vehicles or acquire medicine or information. Players have eight weapons at their disposal, with the default being an automatic pistol with infinite ammo. Other weapons include an uzi, shotgun, flamethrower, plasma rifle, multi-barrel, missile launcher and nuclear grenade launcher. The player shoots by using the mouse and moves with the keyboard. Supplies, ammo and first aid kits are dispersed through levels. Some weapons can be upgraded by adding additional modules named techno packs that increase their range or firepower, by locating them throughout levels. Last Rites features multiple gameplay settings, including the difficulty and the artificial intelligence of the following squad members. The game also supports multiplayer play over a local area network, where players can engage in solo or team deathmatch games set in the levels of the game and two additional levels.

== Reception ==
Reception

Review scores
Publication	Score
PC Action	27%
PC Joker	28%
Pelit	73%
Power Play	45%
Secret Service	6/10

Last Rites received negative reviews, with most critics remarking that the game's design and graphics were lacklustre and dated, with Power Play stating the game "looks like an antique". Describing the game as a "flop", PC Action critiqued the game's "amateurish" and "low-detail" graphics and imprecise controls. PC Joker critiqued the game as "truly the worst" in terms of its "weakly-animated" graphics, "bland" sound effects and "unsuitable" mouse controls. Describing the game as "brimming with boredom", Power Play faulted the game's poor teammate behaviour, uninteresting scenarios and concept, and the lack of a map.

Some reviewers praised Last Rites, although in spite of its flaws. In a positive review, Pelit praised the title as a "zombie movie brought to life" that "perfectly combines gameplay and mindless action", enjoying the controls and impact of the large waves of zombies, whilst noting the game's graphics were "repulsive" and "childish". Secret Services considered whilst it was a clone of Doom, the game's underwhelming graphics were appropriate for its "gloomy atmosphere" and charm, and found shooting large groups of enemies enjoyable. PC Top Player considered the visuals of Last Rites to be poor, although assessing the game was fun and that its lack of detailed 3D models allowed it to support a high number of enemies.
