= Shadowfire (video game) =

1985 video game

- Developer: Denton Designs
- Publisher: Beyond Software
- Platforms: ZX Spectrum, Commodore 64, Amstrad CPC
- Release: 1985
- Genre: Adventure / RPG
- Mode: Single-player

Shadowfire is a video game for the ZX Spectrum and Commodore 64 and later the Amstrad CPC. It was developed by British developer Denton Designs and published by Beyond Software in 1985. The player must direct the Enigma Force to rescue Ambassador Kryxix from the traitor Zoff's flagship before the timer runs out and secret plans for a new type of starship are discovered. Shadowfire was one of the first games to use a menu-and-icon-driven interface. It was well received by reviewers of the time, and followed by a sequel, Enigma Force.

== Plot ==
General Zoff, a traitor to the Empire, is holding Ambassador Kryxix captive in his spaceship. Plans for a new type of spaceship (the Shadowfire of the game's title) are contained in a micro-disc hidden in the Ambassador's spine. If Zoff gets the plans, the empire will be in great danger and it is only a matter of time until his inquisitors will discover them. The Emperor has assembled the Enigma Force, a group of six operatives who are "the cream of the Empire's legions, the worst of its criminal scum or the latest development in cybernetics". The player's task is to rescue Kryxix, and capture both Zoff, and his starship, the Zoff V.

== Gameplay ==
The Commodore 64 and ZX Spectrum versions at the same location. "Personnel" is misspelled on the C64.

Players control all six characters and have one hour and forty minutes of realtime to rescue Ambassador Kryxix and capture General Zoff. All six characters have different abilities. Syylk is an insectoid and a strong fighter; Zark Montor, the team leader, is an expert in unarmed combat and the translator of the group - meaning that Kryxix will only follow Montor; Sevrina Maris is the only character who can pick locks; Torik is an avian and the fastest moving character; Maul is a slow powerful combat droid; and Manto is a weak droid, but the only team member that can operate the transporter that is vital for the mission's success.

Controls are completely icon based and the screen is divided into several sections. The upper screen section is called the mission command screen and displays which character is active, the active character's location and the status of all characters: whether they are moving, engaged in combat, weak or dying or performing certain action such as picking locks. The lower half of the screen changes depending on the situation and shows additional information and all selectable actions.

From the main game screen (Enigma Force screen) players can choose one of the six characters and access four sub-screens:

- Character status screen: Shows a character's speed, strength, stamina (health) and carried weight.
- Object screen: Shows all objects present at a location as well as all objects carried by the selected character. It can be used to drop or pick up items, equip weapons and items, or use special items.
- Movement screen: Here, the active character can be moved by clicking on arrows that show possible directions for a character to move.
- Battle screen: During battles, characters can scan the location to count and identify their enemies, move, attack with or without a weapon, defend, or retreat.

== Development ==
Denton Designs consisted of former employees of Imagine Software who had been working on the infamous Bandersnatch game when the company went into administration. The initial idea for Shadowfire came from Ian Weatherburn who then moved to Ocean Software after being sacked for wanting the company to be more like Imagine. The Enigma Force team were based on characters in American comics, in particular the X-Men and Teen Titans, with artist Simon Butler directly copying the poses from the comics for use in the game manual. The use of icons to control the characters was inspired by the interface of the Apple Lisa computers that had been used at Imagine, and publisher Beyond promoted the game as "the first adventure without text".

Shadowfire was unusual at the time in that it was released with the ZX Spectrum version coded by John Heap on one side of the cassette, and the Commodore 64 version by Dave Colclough on the other. It was later ported to the Amstrad CPC.

According to the manual supplied with the game, an invisible monster (Zoff's pet) roams the ship which will randomly attack the player. This was a bug in the Commodore 64 version which was subsequently fixed, but by then the manual had already been printed.

== Reception ==
Reception

Award
Publication	Award
Crash	Smash

Shadowfire was well-received on both released platforms, gaining a 96% Crash "Smash" for the ZX Spectrum version, a Classic award from Sinclair User and a 91% "Sizzler" award from ZZap!64 for the Commodore 64 version.

Info gave it four stars out of five, describing it as "a very stylish import". While disliking the "tiresome" icon-based controls, the magazine concluded that it was "an unusual and entertaining space-opera offering". The innovative interface, multi-character gameplay and atmospheric music by Fred Gray were also favourably commented upon.

The game reached number 4 in the Commodore 64 charts, and number 3 in both the ZX Spectrum and All Formats charts in June 1985.

In 1991, Crash placed it 71st in their list of the top 100 games for the Spectrum. In 1993, Commodore Force ranked the game at number 12 on its list of the top 100 Commodore 64 games.

== Sequels ==
The game was followed up by Enigma Force later in the year, which featured a more arcade orientated style of gameplay. Whereas Shadowfire was entirely icon based, Enigma Force allowed the player to directly control the reduced list of characters, and play as an action game.

A second sequel, Shadowfire III was in the planning stage when Denton Designs was closed down in the mid 1990's. The game was to be set thirty years after Enigma Force and involved the original six characters being revived from stasis and sent on a mission to assassinate General Zoff, who had managed to escape after being captured at the end of the previous game.
