= Eagle Eye Mysteries =

1993 educational video game

- Genres: Adventure, educational
- Developer: Stormfront Studios
- Publisher: EA*Kids
- Platform: MS-DOS
- First release: Eagle Eye Mysteries; 1993
- Latest release: Eagle Eye Mysteries in London; 1994

Eagle Eye Mysteries is a two-part series of educational video games developed by Stormfront Studios for MS-DOS and published by EA*Kids. The in-game protagonists are twins Jake and Jennifer Eagle who form the Eagle Eye Detective Agency. The character of Jennifer is voiced by Lauren Bloom and Jake is voiced by Evan Enright-Schulz.

In 1994, Creative Labs and EA*Kids released a two-game compilation with both Scooter's Magic Castle and Eagle Eye Mysteries in London. The first game was bundled into the Discovery CD New Edition kit along with 17 other games, while both were featured in Sound Blaster Digital Schoolhouse 4x.

== Development ==
An activity book that came with the first game allowed players to complete a puzzle that would win them a chance to play a character in the sequel.

== Gameplay ==
The game is a first-person detective game that involves reading, writing and puzzle-solving. The player can choose either twin as their companion as they explore the territory and solve cases that are given to them. After each case the player is rewarded with new pages in their digital "scrapbook".

=== Eagle Eye Mysteries: The Original ===
Eagle Eye Mysteries: The Original is centered on Jake and Jennifer Eagle's fictional hometown of Richview. The cases are locally based and usually involved finding something that has gone missing or tracking down a guilty culprit of a local crime. The headquarters for the Eagle Eye Detective Agency is the Eagle's Nest, an elaborate treehouse built in the Eagle family's backyard.

The chief enemy of Jake and Jennifer is a red-headed high school student and local troublemaker called Mark Moriarty, a reference to the famous nemesis of Sherlock Holmes who bears the same surname.

=== Eagle Eye Mysteries in London ===
In the sequel, Jack and Jennifer Eagle go to London on holiday to visit their cousin Nigel, Uncle Basil, and Aunt Miranda. More characters were introduced in this game, including Nigel's friends and various "Londonish" characters (including Nigel's schoolmates, the Tower of London Beefeaters and regulars at the local pub). The game was released in 1994.

The cases involved numerous aspects of English history, geography and literature. Clips before each case were introduced displaying various aspects of London life and culture, which contributed to the educational value of each case. Eagle Eye Mysteries in London also expanded its scope to include cases beyond London in nearby locations like Stonehenge, Torbay, Kenilworth Castle, and Dartmoor National Park, among others. These locations are accessed by Locomotive Train, Double-decker bus or Black Cab.

The game has 50 mysteries to solve.

== Reception ==
PC Mag deemed the "Eagle Eye Mysteries" fun to play. Compute praised the " clever melding of mystery and education", which meant the educational elements were integrated so well as to become "invisible".

Post-Tribune praised "Eagle Eye Mysteries in London" for teaching younger players about deductive reasoning.
