= Eye of Horus (video game) =

1989 video game

- Developer: Denton Designs
- Publisher: Logotron
- Platforms: Amiga, Atari ST, MS-DOS, Commodore 64
- Release: 1989

Eye of Horus is a video game published in 1989 by Fanfare (Britannica Software) for the Amiga.

== Plot ==
Eye of Horus is a game in which the player is Horus searching within a labyrinth for the pieces of his father Osiris, to reassemble Osiris and defeat Set. Hieroglyphs in this labyrinth come to life to attack Horus, and he can use papyrus darts to fight them, or turn into a hawk and fly over enemies. Horus can also find amulets that can either be used to enhance the powers of his weapons, or to grant him other abilities as needed.

== Reception ==
The game was reviewed in 1991 in Dragon #169 by Hartley, Patricia, and Kirk Lesser in "The Role of Computers" column. The reviewers gave the game 1 out of 5 stars.
