= F-22: Air Dominance Fighter =

1997 video game

- Developer: Digital Image Design
- Publishers: EU: Ocean Software; NA: Ocean of America
- Producer: Simon Kershaw
- Designer: Shaun Hollywood
- Programmer: Stephen Powell
- Artists: Ian Boardman; Paul Hollywood
- Platform: Microsoft Windows
- Release: December 1997 (Europe); February 25, 1998 (United States)
- Genre: Combat flight simulator

F-22: Air Dominance Fighter is a combat flight simulator video game developed by Digital Image Design and published by Ocean Software for the PC Windows in 1997. The game simulates the F-22 Raptor stealth fighter. It was preceded by EF2000 and was succeeded by F-22 Total Air War. An expansion, Red Sea Operations, was released in August 1998.

== Reception ==
Reception

Review score
Publication	Score
PC Gamer (US)	90%

F-22: Air Dominance Fighter was nominated in the category of "PC Simulation Game of the Year" during the AIAS' inaugural Interactive Achievement Awards. F-22 ADF was also a runner-up for Computer Gaming World's 1997 "Simulation Game of the Year" award, which ultimately went to Longbow 2. The editors wrote that F-22 ADF "featured dazzling graphics, great flight modeling, and immersive missions, which made this game not only authentic, but fun as well."

== 2026 updated version ==
After a cryptic message posted on September 13, 2024 by the "Digital Image Design Ltd." account, followed by some short video teasers, on February 3, 2026, it was announced (again via a post on X) the release on Steam of a new, improved and updated version of the game for modern CPUs and GPUs. This new version is developed by DiD and published by Microprose. It will feature (quote from the store page):

- Seven campaigns, quick combat mode, and training for more than 90 missions total, from airfield attack to stealth interception.
- Over 50 types of enemies in the air, on the ground, and at sea.
- 30 different weapons, from advanced air-to-air missiles and cluster bombs to unguided rockets.
- Authentic 90s graphics with resolutions ranging from 320×200 to 4k UltraHD with antialiasing.
- Almost 100 enhancements and fixes with respect to the 1997 release.

Updated version is scheduled to be released on Steam February 19, 2026.
