= Frankie Goes to Hollywood (video game) =

1985 video game

- Developer: Denton Designs
- Publisher: Ocean Software
- Platforms: Amstrad CPC, Commodore 64, ZX Spectrum
- Release: NA: 1985; EU: 1985
- Genres: Action-adventure, minigame
- Mode: Single-player

Frankie Goes to Hollywood is an action-adventure video game developed by Denton Designs and published by Ocean Software in 1985 for the Commodore 64, Amstrad CPC, and ZX Spectrum home computers. The game is based on the music of UK band Frankie Goes to Hollywood.

== Objective ==

The game puts the player in Liverpool in search of the Pleasuredome. The player has to find and use various objects and play minigames to reach the goal. The player starts the game as a simple character, with their ultimate goal being to reach the Pleasuredome. To accomplish this the character has to become a "full person". To become a full person, the four attributes (sex, war, love and faith) must be filled to 99%. Additional pleasure points can be scored by playing the minigames. The four attributes are part of the symbols used on the covers of Frankie Goes to Hollywood's albums.

During the game, a murder takes place. All the rooms the player can visit contain clues in order to find the murderer. The clues are in pairs, helping eliminate suspects. For example, the player may be told "The killer is an atheist" and "Mr Somebody is a regular church-goer" - so Mr Somebody would be innocent. In theory, the game cannot be completed without making the correct accusation (by returning to the room with the body) - there is a large bonus of Pleasure Points for naming the killer.

== List of minigames ==
- Sea of Holes
- The Terminal Room
- Cybernetic Breakout
- Cupid's Arrows
- Raid Over Merseyside
- Talking Heads
- Shooting Gallery
- War Room
- Flower Power
- ZTT Room

== Development ==
The game was developed by Denton Designs and the game was based on the engine for Gift from the Gods.

== Music ==
Certain versions of the game feature chiptune versions of the band's songs such as "Relax" and "Welcome to the Pleasuredome". The ZX Spectrum version features an adaptation of "Two Tribes" as the title music. The game package also included a live version of "Relax" on tape cassette.

== Reception ==
Reception

Review score
Publication	Score
Zzap!64	97%

Awards
Publication	Award
Zzap!64	Gold Medal
Crash	Crash Smash
Sinclair User	SU Classic

Roy Wagner reviewed the game for Computer Gaming World, and stated that "The graphics and game play are well done. I think you will find it an interesting game."

In 1991, Your Sinclair included the game at number 71 in their list of the Top 100 Best Spectrum Games of All Time. In 1993, Commodore Force ranked the game at number one on its list of the top 100 Commodore 64 games.

== Sex/Pleasure/Lust ==
The first icon, represented by two sperm in a yin yang image, is variously described as either Sex, Lust or Pleasure. The game inlay refers to the icon as Pleasure, the music press usually referred to it as Sex, and some computer magazines occasionally used the term Lust instead.
