= TFX (video game) =

1993 video game

- MS-DOS cover art
- Developers: Digital Image Design; Tomcat System (PS1)
- Publishers: Ocean Software; Imagineer (PlayStation)
- Designer: Martin Kenwright
- Programmer: Colin Bell
- Composers: Barry Leitch; Dean Evans
- Platforms: MS-DOS, Amiga, PC-98, PlayStation
- Release: 1993: MS-DOS; 1996: PC-88, PlayStation; 1997: Amiga
- Genre: Combat flight simulator
- Mode: Single-player

TFX is a combat flight simulator video game developed by Digital Image Design and published in 1993 by Ocean Software for MS-DOS. Conversions were released for the Amiga, PC-98, and PlayStation

== Gameplay ==
View from the TIALD pod of a Eurofighter during a laser-guided bombing run in TFX

The game features an instant-action arcade mode, custom missions, and a campaign mode. The player can fly three aircraft: The Eurofighter Typhoon, the F-22 and the F-117, and can customize payload for each aircraft. The campaign mode takes place in five theatres - Colombia, Somalia, Libya, the Balkans, and the South Georgia Islands. "TFX" stands for Tactical Fighter E(X)periment.

While 3 planes were simulated, the internal cockpit for all 3 were the same layout. TFX also featured a virtual cockpit mode, although the cockpit itself was more sparse in this mode.

== Development ==
The Eurofighter Typhoon, a playable plane in TFX, was still in its prototype stage when TFX was released, with a real Eurofighter Typhoon not making its first flight until 1994. The interactive parts of the game were reduced to still images or omitted altogether for the Amiga version which, although never officially released by Ocean, was in 1997 included as a give-away game on a CU Amiga cover disk. An experimental port was produced for the original PlayStation shortly after its release. The Soap Opera Engine was manually programmed in TFX, but would be altered to become automated in future games. TFX was shown at the 1994 European Computer Trade Show at the Business Design Centre in London, England. An Atari Jaguar port was slated to be under development by DID but it never released.

== Reception ==
Computer Gaming World briefly reviewed TFX in February 1994, calling it "the most advanced flight model yet" due to the many factors taken into account in the simulation, and further called it a simulator for "purist[s]". Another reviewer from CGW in April 1994 praised TFX's "excellent" effects and "detailed" graphics, but criticized the lack of a rudder and other examples of lack of realism, "predictable" computer tactics, the lack of a campaign setting, and an 'irritating' untoggleable autopilot. The reviewer concluded that "TFX feels old fashioned", further expressing that some aspects felt "unfinished", and recommended it only to casual pilots.

Amiga Computing gave the Amiga version of TFX an overall score of 93% and highly praised its graphics, calling them "breathtakingly atmospheric" and stating that they were "designed to inspire and awe", and expressed that this "visual realism" give the game's missions further depth. Amiga Computing noted TFX's hardware requirements as 'demanding' for the Amiga, but noted that even with lowered settings TFX is 'more impressive than other flight sims' on the Amiga.

In 1994, PC Gamer UK named TFX the 26th best computer game of all time. The editors called it "one of the best flight sims out on the PC and, with a bit of effort, a hugely playable game".
