= Digital Image Design =

British video game developer

- Type: Subsidiary
- Industry: Video games
- Founded: 1989; 37 years ago
- Founder: Martin Kenwright; Phillip Allsopp
- Defunct: 2003
- Successor: Juice Games
- Products: Flight simulators
- Parent: Infogrames (1998-1999); Rage Software (1999-2003)

Digital Image Design (DID) was a British video game developer founded by Martin Kenwright and Phillip Allsopp in 1989. It was originally based in Runcorn, Cheshire in England. The company specialized in aircraft simulator games, mostly published by Ocean Software. DID expanded following the release of TFX, Inferno, and EF2000, and subsequently moved offices to Warrington. During this period, the technology from one of its products was spun off into a military laser designation simulator and they would also produce professional flight simulators for customers such as the Royal Air Force and British Airways. The company envisioned critically acclaimed flight simulators like EF2000 and Wargasm.

After being taken over by Infogrames in 1998, key members of staff including Kenwright and Mick Hocking left to form Evolution Studios together with Ian Hetherington from Psygnosis. The company was subsequently sold to Rage Games Limited in October 1999. The company then begin trading under the name Rage Warrington. After the demise of Rage Games Limited, a company named Juice Games appeared in the same Warrington office, with some key members of staff. Juice Games later became THQ Digital Studios UK.

== Games ==
- F29 Retaliator (1989)
- RoboCop 3 (1991)
- Epic (1992)
- TFX (1993)
- Inferno (1994)
- EF2000 (1995)
- EF2000: TACTCOM (1996)
- F-22: Air Dominance Fighter (1997)
- F-22 Total Air War (1998)
- Lethal Encounter (unreleased)
- Wargasm (1998)
- Eurofighter Typhoon (2001)
- Eurofighter Typhoon: Operation Icebreaker (2002)
