= Denton Designs =

British video games developer

- Type: Private
- Industry: Video games
- Predecessor: Imagine Software
- Founded: September 1984; 42 years ago
- Founders: Steve Cain; Ian Weatherburn; Ally Noble; John Gibson; Karen Davies; Graham Everett; (Note: Graham's surname is spelled differently in various magazine interviews, including "Everritt", "Everrett" "Everitt" and "Everett". The Shadowfire manual spells it "Everett".)
- Defunct: 1995
- Fate: Takeover by Rage Software
- Headquarters: Liverpool, United Kingdom
- Key people: Steve Cain (Art designer), Graham Everett (Software developer), Karen Davies (Art designer), Ally Noble (Art designer), John Gibson (Gameplay programmer)
- Products: Frankie Goes to Hollywood; The Great Escape; Eco; Where Time Stood Still

Denton Designs was a British video game developer based in Liverpool. The company was founded in 1984 and initially specialised in developing software for the ZX Spectrum home computer. Amongst the founders were developers who had worked on the unfinished "Mega game" Bandersnatch for Imagine Software.

== History ==
Denton Designs was founded in September 1984 by six former Imagine staff: Steve Cain, Ian Weatherburn, Ally Noble, John Gibson, Karen Davies and Graham "Kenny" Everett.

The company was initially funded by Ocean Software who published their first games, Gift from the Gods for the ZX Spectrum, and Frankie Goes to Hollywood.

While developing Shadowfire, which was published by Beyond Software to critical acclaim, Ian Weatherburn became disillusioned with the fact that the company was no longer operating as it had when they had been part of Imagine and was sacked by the rest of the directors. He subsequently joined Ocean.

In March 1986, the company split, with founders Cain, Davies, Everett and Gibson leaving. Of the original founders, only Ally Noble remained. Of other members, Steve Cain and Ian Weatherburn formed Canvas Software, Everett worked for Firebird, and John Gibson worked as a freelancer, and some employees later formed the developer Frames.

In December 1995, Denton Designs was acquired by Rage Software.

== Games developed ==
Year	Title	Platform(s)	Publisher
1984	Gift from the Gods	ZX Spectrum	Ocean
1985	Frankie Goes to Hollywood	Amstrad CPC, Commodore 64, ZX Spectrum	Ocean
1985	Roland's Rat Race	Commodore 64, ZX Spectrum	Ocean
1985	Shadowfire	Amstrad CPC, Commodore 64, ZX Spectrum	Beyond Software
1985	Enigma Force	Commodore 64, ZX Spectrum	Beyond Software
1985	The Transformers	Commodore 64, ZX Spectrum	Ocean
1986	Cosmic Wartoad	ZX Spectrum	Ocean
1986	Dante's Inferno	Commodore 64	Beyond Software
1986	Bounces	Commodore 64, ZX Spectrum	Beyond Software
1986	The Great Escape	Amstrad CPC, Commodore 64, MS-DOS, ZX Spectrum	Ocean
1986	Infodroid	Amstrad CPC, Commodore 64	Beyond Software
1987	Double Take	Commodore 64, ZX Spectrum	Ocean
1987	Eco	Amiga, Atari ST	Ocean
1987	Flashpoint	Amstrad CPC, Commodore 64, ZX Spectrum	Ocean
1987	Madballs	Amstrad CPC, Commodore 64, ZX Spectrum	Ocean
1987	Mutants	Amstrad CPC, Commodore 64, ZX Spectrum	Ocean
1988	Where Time Stood Still	Atari ST, MS-DOS, ZX Spectrum	Ocean
1988	Foxx Fights Back	Commodore 64, ZX Spectrum	Image Works
1989	Eye of Horus	Amiga, Atari ST, Commodore 64, MS-DOS	Logotron
1990	Troll	Amstrad CPC, Commodore 64, ZX Spectrum	Kixx
1991	World Class Rugby	Amiga, Amstrad CPC, Atari ST, Commodore 64, ZX Spectrum	Audiogenic
1991	Wreckers	Amiga, Atari ST, MS-DOS	Audiogenic
1992	World Class Rugby: Five Nations Edition	Amiga, Atari ST, MS-DOS	Audiogenic
1993	Batman Returns	Amiga	Konami
1993	Krusty's Fun House	Game Boy, MS-DOS	Virgin Interactive
1994	Soccer	Game Boy	Rage Software
1994	Wembley Rugby League	Amiga, MS-DOS	Audiogenic
