= F-22 Total Air War =

1998 video game

Total Air War
- Developer(s): Digital Image Design
- Publisher(s): Infogrames United Kingdom (Note: Released under the Ocean brand name.)
- Platform(s): Microsoft Windows
- Release: 1998
- Genre(s): Air combat simulation
- Mode(s): Single-player, multiplayer

F-22 Total Air War, also known as Total Air War or by its acronym TAW, is a combat flight simulation video game developed by Digital Image Design and published by Infogrames United Kingdom in 1998. It simulates the F-22 Raptor fighter aircraft. It's a sequel to F-22: Air Dominance Fighter.

== Gameplay ==
The notable features in the game include the ability for the player to dynamically alter their flight campaigns and the realistic physics engine. The storyline in the game revolves around a war campaign over the Red Sea between two ambiguous fighting forces which both feature modern air-combat sorties that are launched against each other in an all out total aerial war. Because the campaign missions are dynamically selected by a computer algorithm built into the game based on the player's performance in battle and random events in the game, no two air missions the player plays should ever be the same.

== Reception ==
The Academy of Interactive Arts & Sciences nominated Total Air War for "PC Simulation Game of the Year" at the 2nd Annual Interactive Achievement Awards, although the game lost to Need for Speed III: Hot Pursuit. Total Air War was a finalist for Computer Gaming World's 1998 "Best Simulation" award, which ultimately went to European Air War.

The Philadelphia Inquirer said "If you want ultra-realistic air combat and don't mind investing the time, Falcon 4.0 is your game. Strategic thinkers will prefer Total Air War's emphasis on the big picture".
