= Ocean Software =

British software development company

Ocean Software Limited
- Type: Video game developer Video game publisher
- Predecessor: Spectrum Games
- Founded: 1983; 43 years ago
- Founder: David Ward; Jon Woods
- Defunct: 1998; 28 years ago
- Fate: Acquired by and later folded into Infogrames
- Successor: Infogrames United Kingdom, now Bandai Namco Entertainment UK
- Headquarters: 6 Central Street, Manchester, England
- Key people: Paul Patterson (Sales Director); Gary Bracey (Development Director); Steve Blower (Art Director); Colin Stokes (Operations Manager); Marc Djan (Ocean France)
- Parent: Ocean International Ltd.

Ocean Software Limited was a British software development company that became one of the biggest European video game developers and publishers of the 1980s and 1990s.

The company was founded by David Ward and Jon Woods and was based in Manchester. Ocean developed dozens of games for a variety of home computer systems such as the ZX Spectrum, Oric 1, Commodore 64, Dragon 32/64, MSX, Amstrad CPC, Commodore 16, Atari ST, Amiga, IBM PC, BBC Micro and video game consoles, such as the Nintendo Entertainment System, Super Nintendo Entertainment System, Master System, and Sega Genesis/Mega Drive.

== History ==
Jon Woods and David Ward created Spectrum Games as a mail-order business in 1983 after being inspired by the success of Liverpool-based software houses Imagine Software, Bug-Byte and Software Projects. Their initial catalogue was based around clones of arcade video games like Frogger and Missile Command for various home computers including the ZX81, ZX Spectrum and VIC-20.

While trying to sell its titles into high street stores it became clear that the company name was confusing to owners of machines other than the ZX Spectrum. The company was renamed Ocean Software leading to some of its games being re-released with different titles so the Berzerk clone Frenzy was reissued as Robotics and Missile Attack became Armageddon.

By September 1984, the success of Ocean allowed Woods and Ward to invest £50,000 in a new software house in return for a 50% stake in the company. U.S. Gold was created by Geoff Brown, owner of Centresoft software distribution, and specialised in importing American Commodore 64 games for the UK market. U.S. Gold had no developers to port the Commodore games for the UK's most popular home computer, the ZX Spectrum, so Ocean produced the conversions of titles such as Beach Head, Raid over Moscow and Tapper through its external development team, Platinum Productions.

In October 1984, Ocean bought the name and branding of Imagine Software from the liquidators of the failed software house. Although originally intended to be a label exclusively for arcade conversions, the Imagine logo would also be used on a number of original titles, as well as on UK releases of games licensed from Spanish developers Dinamic Software.

The company funded an independent game developer in Liverpool, Denton Designs, which was an investor until Denton and Ocean split away later that decade.

In 1985, Ocean and U.S. Gold collaborated again to launch a new label, The Hit Squad, for releasing compilation packages. The first release featured Ocean's Daley Thompson's Decathlon, U.S. Gold's Beach Head, Jet Set Willy from Software Projects and Sabre Wulf by Ultimate Play the Game — all titles which had sold over a million copies — which led to the title They Sold A Million. The compilation went on to sell over a million copies, as did the second and third instalments in the series.

Over half of Ocean's releases for 8-bit home computers were coin-op conversions and licensed games. While initially focused on British licences, such as Hunchback from Manchester's Century Electronics, Liverpool's Frankie Goes to Hollywood, and Olympic decathlete Daley Thompson, its attention soon shifted to film licences, with The NeverEnding Story becoming its first movie tie-in in 1985.

In 1986, a deal was signed with Taito and Data East for home versions of their arcade games, such as Arkanoid, Renegade, The NewZealand Story and Operation Wolf. Operation Wolf was the first title to be converted to 16-bit platforms by Ocean France, a company created by Ocean and Marc Djan in 1986. The studio produced most of its 16-bit arcade conversions until 1991, when the company became Ocean's French marketing and sales department.

=== Success of film-licensed games ===
1986 also produced titles based on the films Rambo, Short Circuit and Cobra, as well as the first licensed Batman game. But it would be its 1988 game RoboCop, adapted from Data East's arcade game based on the film RoboCop, that would go on to become the most successful movie licence in history by the end of the decade.

In 1987, Ocean via Imagine had a deal with Spanish publisher Dinamic Software to release four titles, before launching its own line in the United Kingdom. The following year, Ocean signed a deal with Special FX Software, a company formed by ex-Ocean employees to release titles for home computers, starting with Firefly. The partnership broke up in early 1992 and publish games on its own.

In 1989, The Hit Squad branding reappeared as the new budget re-release label for Ocean's 8-bit back catalogue. The entire series consisted of 122 titles over seven 8-bit formats. Their uniform style and numbering has led to them becoming highly collectable. Meanwhile, the company was working on its next big film tie-in, which would be specifically aimed at the new graphically superior 16-bit computers, the Atari ST and Amiga. Also that year, the company funded a Sheffield-based developer Impact Software Development Limited (later known as Painting by Numbers in 1990), who did major hits like Nightbreed, RoboCop 2, Hook and Run the Gauntlet. The company also funded an independent game developer Digital Image Design, which Ocean later acquire in 1998.

The success of RoboCop established Ocean globally, and it would be Warner Bros. who suggested to Ocean that it produce a tie-in based on its forthcoming Batman movie. The resulting game was another tremendous hit for the company and is now regarded as one of the greatest video game/film tie-ins. The game was used as the basis of the Amiga 500 "Batman Pack", which became one of the most successful hardware/software bundles of all time. In 1990, Ocean launched its new subsidiary, Ocean of America, led by former Data East boss Ray Musci to publish titles for the American market.

Ocean was voted Best 8-bit Software House of the Year at the 1989 Golden Joystick Awards, along with awards for its 8-bit and 16-bit conversions of Operation Wolf.

=== Merger with Infogrames (1996) ===
In 1996, Ocean's parent company Ocean International Ltd. announced it would be purchased by and merge with French publisher Infogrames for £100 million. This was the first key purchase in Infogrames' "Expand through Acquisition" policy. After the merger, Ocean remained as a separate division of Infogrames, continuing to publish and distribute its own games, such as F-22: Air Dominance Fighter., with the UK subsidiary beginning to distribute titles from Infogrames, such as V-Rally.

In 1997, Infogrames' French publishing division Infogrames Télématique launched a European-focused online gaming website under the Ocean brand called Oceanline. The website offered up simplified online versions of a majority of Infogrames' game catalog.

On 8 February 1998, Bruno Bonnell announced that Ocean Software Limited would be rebranded as Infogrames United Kingdom Limited in order to standardize its various subsidiaries under the Infogrames banner. Ocean of America, Inc. was later renamed as Infogrames Entertainment, Inc. Infogrames continued to use Ocean as a brand name for specific titles until the end of the year when the company quietly retired the brand in favour of its own. The last title published under the Ocean brand altogether was the North American release of GT 64: Championship Edition for the Nintendo 64.

=== Aftermath ===
Infogrames Entertainment, Inc. began to publish games under its own banner, replacing Infogrames' previous United States subsidiary I-Motion Inc. Infogrames Entertainment, Inc. was soon folded into Infogrames North America, Inc. — a renaming of Accolade — which then became Infogrames' United States division before being merged and folded into Infogrames, Inc., a renaming of GT Interactive.

The UK subsidiary continued to publish and distribute Infogrames' titles in the country, later being renamed as Atari United Kingdom Limited in 2003. In 2009, Bandai Namco Entertainment purchased Atari SA's European assets, and the remains of Ocean Software are currently part of Bandai Namco Entertainment's UK publishing and distribution division.

== Tape loaders ==
Starting with Daley Thompson's Decathlon in 1984, games on the ZX Spectrum used the Speedlock protection system, which eventually included a countdown timer showing the time left to load a game. On the Commodore 64, Ocean added a full-screen graphic to look at and some catchy music to listen to during the loading of the tape. Several different Loaders were implemented over the years. Eleven loaders are known to have been created for Ocean games. Some of the composers who created the music for the Ocean Loaders were Martin Galway, Jonathan Dunn, and Peter Clarke.

== Games ==
=== Licensed games ===
Highlander for the Commodore 64

- The Addams Family
- The Addams Family: Pugsley's Scavenger Hunt
- Addams Family Values
- Batman
- Batman: The Caped Crusader
- Batman: The Movie
- Clive Barker's Nightbreed: The Action Game
- Clive Barker's Nightbreed: The Interactive Movie
- Cobra
- Cool World
- Darkman
- Dennis the Menace
- Eek the Cat
- The Flintstones
- Frankie Goes to Hollywood
- Highlander
- Hook
- Hudson Hawk
- Jurassic Park
- Knight Rider
- Lethal Weapon
- Manchester United Championship Soccer
- Miami Vice
- Navy Seals
- Platoon
- Rambo
- Rambo 3
- Red Heat
- RoboCop
- RoboCop 2
- RoboCop 3
- Run the Gauntlet
- The Shadow
- Short Circuit
- Street Hawk
- Terminator 2: Judgment Day
- Top Gun
- Total Recall
- The Transformers
- The Untouchables
- V: The Computer Game
- Waterworld
- WWF European Rampage Tour
- WWF WrestleMania

=== Arcade conversions ===
- Arkanoid (1987, Imagine)
- Arkanoid: Revenge of Doh (1988, Imagine)
- Athena (1987, Imagine)
- Cabal (1989)
- Chase H.Q. (1989)
- Chase HQ II (1990)
- Combat School (1987)
- Donkey Kong (1986)
- DragonNinja (1989, Imagine)
- Green Beret (1986, Imagine)
- Galivan (1986, Imagine)
- Gryzor (Contra) (1987)
- Guerrilla War (1988, Imagine)
- Hunchback (1984)
- Hyper Sports (1985, Imagine)
- Konami's Golf (1986, Imagine)
- Konami's Tennis (1986, Imagine)
- The Legend of Kage (1987, Imagine)
- MagMax (1987, Imagine)
- Midnight Resistance (1990)
- Mikie (1985, Imagine)
- The NewZealand Story (1989)
- Operation Thunderbolt (1990)
- Operation Wolf (1988)
- Pang (1990)
- Ping Pong (1986, Imagine)
- Psycho Soldier (1987, Imagine)
- Rainbow Islands (1990)
- Rastan (1988, Imagine)
- Renegade (1987, Imagine)
- Salamander (1988)
- Shadow Warriors (1990)
- Slap Fight (1987, Imagine)
- Space Gun (1992)
- Terra Cresta (1986, Imagine)
- Toki (1991)
- Yie Ar Kung-Fu (1985, Imagine)

=== Other games ===
- 90 Minutes European Prime Goal (SNES PAL) (1995)
- Animal (1996)
- Armageddon (1983)
- Battle Command (1990)
- Beach Volley (1989)
- Burnin' Rubber (1990)
- Cavelon (1984)
- Central Intelligence (1994) (included in Ocean Classics on Steam)
- Cheesy (1996)
- Choplifter III (1994)
- ClayFighter (SNES PAL) (1994)
- Claymates (SNES PAL) (1993)
- Daley Thompson's Decathlon (1984)
- Daley Thompson's Olympic Challenge (1988)
- Daley Thompson's Star Events (1985)
- Daley Thompson's Supertest (1985)
- Digger Dan (1983)
- Doom (SNES PAL) (1996)
- Eco (1987)
- EF2000 (1997)
- Elf (1991)
- Epic (1992)
- F29 Retaliator (1990)
- FIFA International Soccer (SNES PAL) (1994)
- Fighters Destiny (Nintendo 64) (1998)
- Fighters Destiny 2 (Nintendo 64) (1999)
- The Great Escape (1986)
- The Games '92: España (1992)
- GT Racing 97 (1997)
- Head over Heels (1987)
- Helikopter Jagd (1986)
- Hunchback II (1985)
- Island of Death (1983)
- Inferno (1994)
- Ivanhoe (1990)
- Jelly Boy (1995)
- Jersey Devil (1997)
- Kid Chaos, also known as Kid Vicious (1994)
- Kong (1983)
- Kong Strikes Back! (1984)
- Last Rites (1997)
- Lost Patrol (1990)
- Madden NFL '95 (SNES PAL) (1994)
- Match Day (1985)
- Match Day II (1987)
- Micro Machines (SNES & Game Boy) (1994)
- Micro Machines 2: Turbo Tournament (SNES & Game Boy) (1996)
- Mr. Nutz (1993)
- Mr. Nutz: Hoppin' Mad (1994)
- Mr. Wimpy (1984)
- MRC: Multi-Racing Championship (Nintendo 64) (1997)
- NBA Live 95 (SNES PAL) (1994)
- Nightmare Rally (1986)
- Parallax (1986)
- Parasol Stars (1992)
- Pushover (1992)
- Renegade III: The Final Chapter (1989, Imagine)
- Sleepwalker (1993)
- Soccer Kid (1994)
- Super James Pond (SNES & Game Boy PAL) (1993)
- Super Soccer (ZX Spectrum) (1986, Imagine)
- Super Turrican 2 (1995)
- Target: Renegade (1988, Imagine)
- TFX (1993)
- Transversion
- True Pinball (1996)
- Tunnel B1 (1996) (Published by Acclaim Entertainment in North America)
- Voyager (Atari ST, Amiga) (1989)
- Weaponlord (SNES PAL) (1995)
- Where Time Stood Still (1987)
- Wizball (1987)
- Wizkid (1992)
- Worms (1995)
- X2 (1996)
- Zero Divide (1996)

=== Post-Infogrames titles ===
The last few titles from Ocean before being renamed were published and distributed under Infogrames' umbrella, and consisted mostly of titles from Infogrames themselves.

Game	Developer	Platform	Release date	Note
I-War/Independence War	Particle Systems	Microsoft Windows	November 1997 (PAL); 18 August 1998 (US)	PAL release published by Infogrames Multimedia. North American release published as Infogrames Entertainment.
F-22: Air Dominance Fighter	Digital Image Design	Microsoft Windows	1 December 1997 (PAL)	North American release published as Infogrames Entertainment.
Fighters Destiny	Opus Corp.	Nintendo 64	26 January 1998 (US); 1 March 1998 (PAL)	PAL release published as Infogrames United Kingdom.
GT 64: Championship Edition	Imagineer	Nintendo 64	14 April 1998 (PAL); 31 August 1998 (US)	PAL release published as Infogrames United Kingdom. North American release published as Infogrames Entertainment.
Lucky Luke	Infogrames Multimedia	PlayStation	3 May 1998 (PAL); November 1998 (US)	PAL release published by Infogrames Multimedia. North American release published as Infogrames Entertainment.
Hexplore	Heliovisions Productions	Microsoft Windows	1998 (PAL); September 1998 (US)	PAL release published by Infogrames Multimedia. North American release published by I•Motion and distributed by Infogrames Entertainment.
Wetrix	Zed Two	Nintendo 64, Microsoft Windows	Nintendo 64; 12 June 1998 (US); 16 June 1998 (PAL); Microsoft Windows; 1998 (US and PAL)	PAL release published as Infogrames United Kingdom. North American release published as Infogrames Entertainment.
V-Rally: Championship Edition	Velez & Dubail	Game Boy	July 1998	PAL-regions only. Published by Infogrames Multimedia.
Viper	X-ample Developments	PlayStation	15 July 1998	PAL-regions only. Published as Infogrames United Kingdom Limited.
Mission: Impossible	Infogrames	Nintendo 64	16 July 1998 (US); 25 September 1998 (PAL)	North American release published as Infogrames Entertainment. PAL release published as Infogrames United Kingdom.
Snow Racer 98	Power & Magic	PlayStation	23 July 1998	Europe only, published by Infogrames Multimedia.
Heart of Darkness	Amazing Studios	PlayStation	31 July 1998	European release, published as Infogrames Multimedia. Published by Interplay Productions in North America.
F-22 Total Air War	Digital Image Design	Microsoft Windows	Late-1998	PAL-regions only. Published as Infogrames United Kingdom Limited.
