= Index of DOS games (X) =

This is an index of DOS games.

This list has been split into multiple pages. Please use the Table of Contents to browse it.

Title	Released	Developer(s)	Publisher(s)
Xargon	1993	Epic MegaGames	Epic MegaGames
Xatax	1994	Pixel Painters	Pixel Painters
XCar: Experimental Racing	1997	Bad Dog	Bethesda Softworks LLC
X-COM: Apocalypse	1997	Mythos Games	MicroProse
X-COM: Terror from the Deep	1995	MicroProse	MicroProse
X-COM: UFO Defense	1994	MicroProse Software, Mythos Games	MicroProse Software
Xenomorph	1990	Pandora Software	Pandora Software
Xenon	1988	Bitmap Brothers	Bitmap Brothers
Xenon 2 Megablast	1989	The Assembly Line	Image Works
Xenophage: Alien Bloodsport	1995	Argo Games	Apogee Software
XF5700 Mantis	1992	Microplay Software	Microplay Software
X-Men: Madness in Murderworld	1989	Paragon Software	Paragon Software
X-Men II: The Fall of the Mutants	1990	Paragon Software	Medalist International
X-Men: Children of the Atom	1997	Probe Entertainment	Acclaim Entertainment
X-Men: The Ravages of Apocalypse	1997	Zero Gravity Entertainment	WizardWorks
Xonix	1984	Ilan Raab, Dani Katz	
XS	1996	SCi	SCi
