= Ian Terry (game designer) =

British computer game designer

Ian Paul Terry (born 11 February 1966) is an English computer game designer and artist. He was responsible for designing a variety of games from the early ZX Spectrum through to PC. He has co-designed successful games such as Rebelstar and Lords of Chaos, and was the lead designer in the creation of Magic and Mayhem.

== Early career ==
Ian Terry began his career in 1984 when he set up Target Games after he received a royalty cheque from a book publisher, who had just shipped the first print run of a supplementary rule book that he had written just after leaving school.

Ian drew his inspiration at this time from the video movie genre and began to design board games based on popular movies. The first of these came into fruition when he acquired the games rights to John Carpenter’s “Halloween” movie.

Work on Target games was prematurely halted in 1986 when legal and contractual problems with the Maxwell-owned Fleetway Publications forced a standstill with other developments, and a subsequent lack of funding. In an effort to move away from these problems, he sought entry into the emerging computer games market and was introduced to Julian Gollop, a local games programmer. Together, they redirected Target Games, making it a limited company, with efforts concentrated solely on computer games.

== Target Games Ltd ==
In 1987, Target Games was established. In this newly founded company, Ian and Julian Gollop designed Rebelstar and Laser Squad before working on the early design for Lords of Chaos.

Laser Squad formed the basis of what Mythos Games would later develop as UFO: Enemy Unknown (also known as X-Com), which later went on to become an international best-seller and a franchise in its own right.

Ian left Target Games in 1990 to set up Dimension Designs.

== Dimension Designs ==
Established in 1991, Dimension Designs was a small, local co-operative made up of wargames enthusiasts who created scenery and accessories for miniature-based games. Ian Terry was given the opportunity of designing and creating for them a scenery system made entirely out of cards which would prove both economical and flexible for the end user. This formed the basis of what was called the “Microscape” system, which achieved worldwide sales.

During his time at Dimension Designs, Terry learned silicon mould making skills and miniature sculpture techniques, which subsequently enabled him to create master sculptures for various manufacturers on a freelance basis as a result.

== Bullfrog Productions ==
Ian joined Bullfrog Productions in 1993. He acquired the job due to his previous design work, and his first task under this company was to assist in the output of graphics for Theme Park and Syndicate: American Revolt under Peter Molyneux.

During this time, Ian worked with four other artists, and contributed visuals from his own designs for Theme Park, as well as terrain for American Revolt (a Syndicate mission disc). Before leaving Bullfrog, Ian also supplied the initial graphics and animations that were required for Dungeon Keeper in its infancy, to showcase to the publishers (Electronic Arts).

== Trip Partners ==
In January 1994, Ian Terry created Trip Partners along with a senior programmer. With this company, he created Doods, a turn-based strategy sci-fi game, originally intended to showcase their talents. However, it soon became a full-time project once they acquired publisher involvement.

== Mythos Games ==
In April 1995, Ian Terry joined Mythos Games, which put him working alongside Julian Gollop once again in his already well-established company.

The first project Ian worked on was the design of the game Magic and Mayhem. This was by far his highest profile project, as it received a lot of funding. He was involved with the initial project proposal, through to the final delivery. Acting as Lead Artist and assisting in setting up a new team, he took on a much greater role. Severe financial limitations with the publisher (Virgin Interactive) on the month of release badly affected initial shipout, in spite of very positive press and universally high review scores. The product fared better under publication of Bethesda in America, and was a surprise hit in less recognisable territories, such as China and Italy.

Ian Terry then worked on X-COM: Apocalypse as a graphic designer. He designed the game interiors and environment, and after the game was finished, he left Mythos Games in May 1999.

== Freelance Work ==
After his work at Mythos Games, Ian Terry went on to become a freelance artist for a variety of companies, making games for the Game Boy Color, Game Boy Advance and the Nintendo DS.

After 2004, he became a freelance artist for many non-game related projects, pursuing his own talent in sculpting, painting and writing. He is still doing this presently.

== Games ==
- Rebelstar (1986) (designer)
- Rebelstar II (1988) (designer)
- Laser Squad (1988) (designer)
- Lords of Chaos (1990) (designer on initial development)
- Syndicate: American Revolt (1993) (artist)
- Theme Park (1994) (artist)
- Doods (1995) (designer, artist)
- Dungeon Keeper (1997) (initial artist)
- X-Com: Apocalypse (1997) (artist)
- Magic and Mayhem (1998) (lead designer, lead artist)
- Gex: Deep Pocket Gecko (1999) (artist)
- Sydney 2000 (2000) (Cancelled due to manufacturing problems) (artist)
- Men in Black 2: The Series (2000) (artist)
- Commander Keen (2001) (artist)
- Doom (2001) (artist)
- Star Wars: Episode II – Attack of the Clones (2002) (artist)
- Need for Speed: Underground 2 (2005) (artist)
- The Hobbit: An Unexpected Journey (2012) (artist)
