= Tom Clancy's Ghost Recon: Shadow Wars =

2011 video game

- Developer: Ubisoft Sofia
- Publisher: Ubisoft
- Producer: Julian Gollop
- Designers: Andrey Velkov; Yavor Mihaylov
- Programmer: Stefan Dyulgerov
- Artist: Borislav Bogdanov
- Writers: Daniel Greenberg (story); Martin Capel; Bozhidar Grozdanov
- Composer: Elitsa Yovcheva
- Series: Tom Clancy's Ghost Recon
- Platform: Nintendo 3DS
- Release: EU: March 25, 2011; NA: March 27, 2011; AU: March 31, 2011; JP: May 19, 2011
- Genre: Turn-based tactics
- Modes: Single-player, multiplayer

Tom Clancy's Ghost Recon: Shadow Wars is a turn-based tactics video game for the Nintendo 3DS developed and published by Ubisoft in 2011. The game is part of the Ghost Recon series of the Tom Clancy games. First images of the game were leaked by IGN in 2010. The game was released on March 25, 2011 in Europe, March 27 in North America, and March 31 in Australia as a launch title for Nintendo's new console. It was later released in Japan on May 19, 2011. The game released in North America five days before the Nintendo 3DS North American launch. Ubisoft announced that the game was also going to be released in iOS, however, it's still remained unreleased.

Shadow Wars received generally positive reviews from critics, who praised its gameplay, design and combat, and called it an improvement over its recent predecessors, while criticizing its multiplayer and characters.

== Gameplay ==
The battle system is similar to other turn-based tactics video games, such as Advance Wars and Fire Emblem, but elevation and cover play a critical tactical role and its support fire system makes the combat system distinctive. The battle system is similar to Gollop's previous video games Rebelstar: Tactical Command and UFO: Enemy Unknown.

Completing objectives in missions gives the player points which can be used to upgrade the rank of each unit. Units have a predetermined development tree, with each new level granting a mix of Hit Point (HP) bonuses, new abilities and alternative equipment. Players choose which points to spend on each unit.

The game can be played in three modes:

- Campaign Game: The single player campaign has 37 missions for a total playing time of around 35–45 hours, depending on difficulty level selected. The player controls a team of up to six Ghosts through the story based campaign, leveling them up and upgrading their equipment as the story progressed.
- Skirmish Missions: There are 20 skirmish missions which are standalone missions with fixed teams and deployments.
- Multiplayer Missions: There are 10 multiplayer missions which are played using a single 3DS console.

The game features several playable characters:

- Commando: The Commando (Duke) is equipped with an assault rifle and a hi-tech shoulder mounted missile launcher. The commando is effectively like human artillery, but very mobile. They come in two types: anti-vehicle or anti-personnel.
- Sniper: The sniper (Haze) is a long range specialist. He has a choice between heavy sniper rifles, with good armor penetration, or light sniper rifles, which give better mobility. His secondary weapons include a choice of either AP or EMP grenades.
- Gunner: The gunner (Richter) is equipped with a high-powered automatic weapon with excellent damage and return fire, but limited maneuverability. He has a choice of grenades for his secondary weapon.
- Medic: The Medic (Saffron) has effective personal defense weapons and a choice of medi-kits, including a 'stim kit', which can allow characters to act again, or a 'boost kit', which provides power points.
- Recon: The Recon (Banshee) is equipped with a special camouflage system that prevents any direct attacks against her unless she is revealed by an adjacent enemy. She is equipped with silenced carbines for a main weapon, and a choice of EMP grenades or knife for secondary weapon.
- Engineer: The engineer (Mint) is equipped with an assault rifle as his main weapon. His secondary equipment is either a deployable gun turret or an armed, mobile drone. He can also repair vehicles and drones.

In addition to these there are other units which join the player's squad as part of the story and can be issued instructions during missions.

== Plot ==
In the immediate aftermath of political turmoil within the Russian Federation, Yuri Treskayev, an ultranationalist figure, is maneuvering to seize power by reviving forgotten Soviet-era military infrastructure. Intelligence reports reveal that Treskayev’s faction has begun reactivating a network of hidden “Dead Hand” missile and drone bases across Kazakhstan, Ukraine and Siberia, originally built during the Cold War. These clandestine installations are being refurbished to assemble a mechanized army of autonomous drones, unmanned launch platforms and advanced weapon systems in preparation for destabilizing adjacent states and consolidating his control. In response, an elite United States special-operations unit, the “Ghosts”, is deployed to intervene and prevent the threat from escalating into open war.

First operation to take them deep into the deserts and steppe of Kazakhstan, the Ghosts are tasked with investigating a series of pipeline sabotage attacks and insurgent movements linked to Treskayev’s clandestine forces. As they unravel a broader conspiracy, the Ghosts discover that the provocations are designed to foment regional instability and trigger state collapse in neighboring countries, thereby creating the conditions for Treskayev’s power grab. Progressing from reconnaissance and hostage-rescue missions to full-scale sabotage operations, the Ghosts locate and neutralize one of the refurbished Dead Hand bases hidden in mountainous terrain. This base houses drone assembly lines and automated launch systems, revealing that Treskayev’s ambitions extend beyond conventional insurgency into asymmetric technological warfare.

Following their success in Kazakhstan, the narrative shifts into Ukraine, which becomes a key theatre of operations as Treskayev’s forces launch wave after wave of drone strikes, rail-hub seizures and sabotage of under-defended infrastructure aimed at undermining Ukrainian sovereignty. Operating behind enemy lines, the Ghosts carry out missions to hold bridgeheads, intercept convoys, and assist Ukrainian resistance elements while being increasingly pressed by the combined threat of drones, mechanized infantry, and shadow-state proxies. As the conflict escalates, the Ghosts’ deployment evolves from covert insertion into overt warfare, reflecting how the adversary has grown from a fringe network into a near-state actor capable of tipping the balance of power in the region.

In the final act the Ghosts pursue the offensive into the frozen expanse of Siberia, penetrated via a hidden corridor of transit and rail into the heart of Treskayev’s command infrastructure. In a climactic mission they locate the core underground complex from which the drone-army is effectively orchestrated: a vast subterranean facility that hosts the final assembly of missile-capable drones, their launch control, and the command hierarchy coordinating the broader coup. The Ghosts infiltrate this compound, neutralize key leadership elements, destroy the drone launch network and sever the connection between the political campaign and its military execution mechanism. With the destruction of the Dead Hand bases and the capture or elimination of Treskayev’s lieutenants, the immediate threat is thwarted and the stability of the region restored.

The Ghost team evolves from covert operatives on reconnaissance missions into frontline warriors in a full-scale conflict: their load-outs upgrade, their equipment becomes higher-tech, including drones and advanced armor, and the scale of mission objectives grows from “clear the outpost” to “penetrate subterranean missile fortification”. This evolution mirrors the escalation of Treskayev’s ambition and the urgency of the global threat. The Ghosts’ mission then gradually transforms from marginal special-forces actions into a sprawling multi-national conflict, as their equipment, tactics and mission scope escalate in response to Treskayev’s growing capacity. What begins as a search-and-destroy series of missions becomes a full-scale war of attrition against a hyper-technological insurgency. The narrative thereby weaves themes of power politics, covert warfare, technological escalation and the consequences of ideological ambition in the post-Cold War era.

== Reception ==
Reception

Aggregate scores
Aggregator	Score
GameRankings	78.88%
Metacritic	77/100

Review scores
Publication	Score
Edge	7/10
Eurogamer	7/10
Famitsu	29/40
Game Informer	8.25/10
GamePro	4/5
GameRevolution	B
GameSpot	8/10
GameTrailers	8.1/10
IGN	7/10
Nintendo Power	8/10
Common Sense Media	4/5
Digital Spy	3/5

Reviews for the game were generally favorable. GameRankings gave it a score of 78.88%, while Metacritic gave it 77 out of 100. GameSpot scored the game 8 out of 10, but called the story one-dimensional. Official Nintendo Magazine praised the game's accessibility and gave it an 80%. Anthony Gallegos of IGN criticized the game's multiplayer component, repetitiveness of the campaign and clichéd characters but stated that the game was still fun enough for him to recommend to turn-based game fans, ending with scoring it a 7 out of 10.
