= The Dreamland Chronicles: Freedom Ridge =

- Logo of the game
- Developer: Mythos Games
- Designer: Julian Gollop
- Engine: NetImmerse, Havok
- Platforms: PlayStation 2, Windows
- Release: Unreleased
- Genres: Strategy, turn-based tactics, first-person shooter

The Dreamland Chronicles: Freedom Ridge is an unreleased video game for Microsoft Windows and PlayStation 2 by Mythos Games. Developed by the team which produced UFO: Enemy Unknown, including lead designer Julian Gollop, the game was planned to be "a remake of the first X-COM with 3D graphics," as the first of four games planned in the new series. Cancelled in 2001, the unfinished game was later bought and partially turned into UFO: Aftermath by Altar Interactive, which was in turn itself followed by two sequels. Some elements of the game are also present in Gollop's own Phoenix Point.

== Gameplay ==
According to the GameSpot preview, the Freedom Ridge interface followed a three-tiered format: a rotatable and zoomable global strategy view, showing various areas of interest and an outline of the human (allied) and alien (enemy) zones of control (similar to the Geoscape in the UFO: Enemy Unknown and also in accelerated real-time); a 3D isometric view tactical screen when the player controls a squad in turn-based combat; and a first-person view to control the squad's individual units while aiming their weapons. The game's environment was presented with a detailed 3D graphics and was fully destructible ("floors, beams, and roofs can collapse, and entire buildings can be leveled if enough damage is sustained"). During the action sequences, the camera would switch from the isometric to the first-person view for special effects, such as to trail behind a fired missile.

Project leader Julian Gollop later said it was "quite an ambitious project". He claimed that, had it been released, The Dreamland Chronicles would have been very similar in gameplay terms to the much later tactical role-playing game Valkyria Chronicles, released for the PlayStation 3 in 2008: "We had a third-person camera view behind your character with a bar representing your Action Points, which went down as you moved. When you went into shooting mode it went into a first-person view and you could select snap shots or aimed shots, which altered the size of an aiming circle on screen."

== Plot ==
In the game, humankind had lost Earth to the dinosaur-like Saurans following a devastating 70-day war in the year 2003. In the aftermath of the war, the player takes command of a small resistance group named the Terran Liberation Army, in a desperate struggle to regain the planet. They must scramble to protect the areas left in their control and find more supplies and troops, and capture aliens and their equipment to research the alien technology and use it against them. Along the way, human resistance uncovers the truth behind alien abductions, UFO conspiracy theories and Area 51 ("Dreamland" is a name often used for Area 51, located near the vantage point called Freedom Ridge), and soon discover other powerful forces at work, including an alien race different from the Saurans (the Reticulans) and the reclusive and mysterious Men in Black.

== Development ==
Freedom Ridge was announced in 2000, using "a lot of new technology" such as the sophisticated environment physics engine Havok. The development was first put on hold in February 2001, as Gollop's team failed to find the publisher for their game. It was restarted by Bethesda Softworks, which in turn ceased funding the project in April 2001. It was cancelled later that year by Titus Interactive, and Mythos Games ceased to exist. According to Gollop in 2011: "Titus had no interest in what we were doing – they were only after Interplay's assets, and they cancelled the project...we had no choice but to wind up the company at that point."

== UFO: Aftermath ==
In mid-2001, Virgin Interactive, who possessed Dreamland rights, prompted the Czech developer Altar Interactive to restart production on the PC version. However, the game was renamed, first to UFO: Freedom Ridge, and then to UFO: Aftermath. More and more changes were made as the reboot progressed. Even the game engine was completely different in the final product, as the new developer did not acquire rights to the Havok physics engine and other middleware graphics and sound elements and instead made their own. Eventually, very few elements of the original Freedom Ridge project remained in the finished UFO: Aftermath when it was released in 2003. Altar themselves described it as "a completely new game with a different combat system, new graphics, and a vastly different background story." Nevertheless, UFO: Aftermath also begins following the alien conquest of Earth (here instant and completely apocalyptic) and also features a struggle to stop the alien terraforming of the planet, as well as a "Dreamland Files" mission in Area 51, but the Reticulans are the enemy (controlling mutated dead humans and animals) and the Saurans do not appear at all. UFO: Aftermath was later followed by two sequels, UFO: Aftershock and UFO: Afterlight.

According to Martin Klíma, leader of Altar team, they had received the five CD-ROMs with the source code from the original developers through Virgin. According to Klíma, a playable version of the game never existed in a technically stable form: "There was some basic source code, which could not be compiled, although we tried to put it together for quite long time. Especially because to it (source code) were linked perhaps all middleware libraries. Mythos did not do any own work. Physics engine, 3D engine, that all was licensed and the question is, what they really did for that year and £800,000. We had to begin from start, we could not use single line of code either from original Dreamland or [Altar's own] Original War, which was written in Delphi language." Gollop retorted: "Unfortunately they [Altar] stripped out our fantastic turn based stuff and they put what I thought was a rather weak real-time thing in there."

== See also ==
- Laser Squad Nemesis
- X-COM: Alliance
- X-COM: Genesis
