= Magic and Mayhem =

1998 video game

- European cover art
- Developer: Mythos Games
- Publishers: EU: Virgin Interactive; NA: Bethesda Softworks
- Producer: Paul Whipp
- Designers: Julian Gollop; Ian Terry
- Programmers: Ian Tory; Nick Gollop
- Artists: Ian Terry and Charles Abrahams
- Composers: Simon Emerson; Martin Russell
- Platform: Microsoft Windows
- Release: EU: November 1998; NA: May 5, 1999
- Genres: Action, real-time strategy, role-playing
- Modes: Single-player, multiplayer

Magic & Mayhem (working title: Duel: The Mage Wars) is a fantasy/mythology-themed real-time strategy game designed by Julian Gollop and developed by Mythos Games. It was published by Virgin Interactive Entertainment (European release) in late 1998, and by Bethesda (North American release) soon after in 1999. Although the game received generally positive criticisms, it met a quiet public reception.

Magic and Mayhem was designed by Gollop as the next incarnation of his successful Chaos video game concept, involving the same mythical wizard combat. Like in Chaos, the player assumes the role of a wizard that can cast spells and summon creatures in order to defeat the other wizards in the battle.

In the single-player campaign, the player assumes the role of Cornelius, a young magician who yearns to become his uncle Lucan's apprentice. He arrives at Lucan's home shortly after graduation from the Hermetic Academy and eager to begin his study, only to find his uncle gone and the home in ruins.

A sequel, Magic & Mayhem: The Art of Magic, was released in October 2001 for Windows.

== Gameplay ==
The player's primary character is their wizard, and who can cast spells, summon creatures and (in the campaign) interact with other characters. The wizard and any summoned creatures are controlled, as in most strategy games, by dragging selection boxes and using the mouse buttons to interact and issue orders. Casting spells and summoning creatures uses mana. Wizards replenish their mana by occupying "Places of Power" with their creatures, or using up one-use "mana sprites" that are picked up around the map. Magic and Mayhem is built into an isometric grid, with creatures occupying (or flying above) squares on the board.

In-game screenshot

The game includes two game modes; the campaign progression and a "quick battle" option, similar to a deathmatch. The campaign is single-player only, but quick battle can be either single or multiplayer over a LAN network.

The Portmanteau

Magic and Mayhem uses a unique spell system, in which magical ingredients are needed to be able to cast each spell in the game. In the campaign game mode, these ingredients (such as Brimstone, Clover and Zircon) are gradually acquired as the game progresses. Before each level begins, the player can use their Portmanteau spell-box to combine an ingredient with a "talisman" of either Law, Chaos or Neutrality. This results in a spell that the player can use for the duration of the battle, and which can be changed again after the battle has ended.

== Plot ==
=== Setting ===
Magic and Mayhem is set in three mythological/historical realms; Albion, Greece and Avalon, covering Arthurian, Greek, and Celtic themes respectively. In the campaign, the player journeys their way through each realm in order, with map designs and terrain corresponding to the current realm. For example, maps set in Albion may include medieval gothic castles, whereas Greek maps contain classical mediterranean architecture.

Geographically, each realm is not strictly adherent to their historic counterparts; for instance, the "Greek" realm is modified slightly, with Colchis and Crete separated from Greece by only a thin stretch of ocean channel. Myths, such as Jason and the Golden Fleece, are also modified slightly, with Cornelius rather than Jason retrieving the artefact.

=== Story ===
The game's introductory movie presents Cornelius as he visits his uncle's magical laboratory, only to find it in ruins. He deduces that something bad must have befallen the absent Lucan, as his flying machine is primed and ready for a trip. Cornelius decides to undertake the journey his uncle was planning. A raven, soon after introduced as Hermes, accompanies Cornelius from thereon throughout the game; Cornelius decides this must be Lucan's familiar.

Cornelius crashes in Avalon, ruining the flying machine. He begins his quest to find his uncle, soon encountering hostile wizards who are none-too-helpful in aiding him. On his journey through Avalon, he meets allies including Twigkindle the brownie king and Percival the knight, the latter of which joins Cornelius in return for his aid in finding the Grail. The two soon acquire the Grail, and eventually reach the castle Joyous Garde, the centre of villainy in Avalon. After an epic battle with the resident baron-wizard Bertilak, Cornelius finds and frees his uncle Lucan, only to confront the game's main antagonist, the Overlord. The Overlord demands Cornelius hand over the Grail, but when Cornelius refuses, the Overlord leaves without a fight. Lucan, who had been kidnapped by the Overlord's minions, reveals that his power is weak in Avalon. After the battle, Cornelius wants nothing more than to return to the mundane world with Lucan, but it is revealed they must find a specific portal to do so, so their quest must continue through a magical gateway into Greece.

Arriving in Greece, Cornelius continues to travel looking for a way back home, but encountering yet more hostile wizards and evidence of the Overlord's misdeeds. He stumbles upon Ariadne, angering her by his intrusion into her home, but besting her in combat and forcing her to flee. He eventually arrives in Delphi, defeats the tyrannical wizard that keeps the city in chaos, and consults the Oracle on the Grail. It is revealed that the Grail grants immortality, and explains why the Overlord demanded it of Cornelius in Avalon. The Oracle also reveals that the Golden Fleece of Colchis must be retrieved for the Grail to work. Cornelius travels to Colchis and defeats the dragon that guards the Fleece, taking it for himself. After killing the ruler of Colchis, King Aeetes, he unwittingly releases the witch Medea who escapes back to the mainland. Cornelius arrives in Sparta to find the city in ruins by the hand of the Overlord. He finds Ariadne and Lucan sheltering from Medea, who turns out to be a servant of the Overlord. Cornelius defeats Medea a second time, and forces her to flee to the Labyrinth in Crete. He soon catches up and defeats her, at the same time finding a magical gateway to Albion beneath the maze.

In Albion, Cornelius, Ariadne and Lucan encounter Sir Lancelot, loyal knight of the deceased King Arthur. He reveals the Overlord usurped and murdered Arthur, hunting his loyal surviving knights over Albion. Lucan reveals that finding Merlin, Arthur's royal wizard, may be the only way to stop the Overlord. Cornelius arrives in Broceliande, the last known whereabouts of Merlin, to find his tower empty. They continue their quest onto mainland Albion and Salisbury Plain, where Lucan is slain by the Overlord and the remaining protagonists flee. Cornelius continues his quest, gathering Arthur's loyal knights and attacking Camelot, freeing Ariadne and Lancelot and retaking the castle. Cornelius and his allies eventually meet the Overlord at Dinas Emrys, discover that he is Merlin, defeat him, and return to the mundane world.

== Multimedia ==
=== Music ===
The background music for Magic and Mayhem was composed by Afro Celt Sound System, and was highly regarded by game reviews. As stated by Simon Emmerson, founder of the group, in the game's manual:

The Mythos Team were drawn to The Afro Celt Sound System because our last record (Vol. 1: Sound Magic, Real World Records CDRW61) had the slow builds and epic soundscapes they felt would work wonders in a multi-media context. Our task was to create a soundtrack subliminal enough to provide good background atmospheres as well as performance pieces and themes for respective realms.

Emmerson was joined on the soundtrack by musicians Ronan Browne (bagpipes), Nigel Eaton (hurdy-gurdy), James McNally (bodhrán, accordion, whistle, percussion), and Rémi Chauvet (harp).

=== Movies and cutscenes ===
Magic and Mayhem uses distinctive claymation for its movie cutscenes.

The game's creatures and mythological characters were constructed by animation expert Alan Friswell, using the stop-motion techniques made popular in the films of Willis O'Brien and Ray Harryhausen. The figures were made of modelling clay and latex rubber, over an armature of wire and ball-and-socket joints. The models were then moved incrementally, while being filmed one frame at a time.

== Development ==
The game was announced in January 1998. In January 1999, Virgin Interactive signed a US publication and distribution deal with Bethesda.

== Reception ==
Reception

Aggregate score
Aggregator	Score
GameRankings	78%

Review scores
Publication	Score
AllGame	4.5/5
CNET Gamecenter	9/10
Computer Games Strategy Plus	4/5
Computer Gaming World	3.5/5
Game Informer	8.25/10
GamePro	4.5/5
GameSpot	6.4/10
IGN	7.3/10
PC Accelerator	7/10
PC Gamer (US)	76%

The game received favorable reviews according to the review aggregation website GameRankings. Computer Games Strategy Plus and PC Accelerator gave the MSN Gaming Zone version favorable reviews, a few months before it was released Stateside.

According to Manveer Heir from Voodoo Extreme, the game was a financial success in Europe.
