= Rebelstar: Tactical Command =

2005 video game

- Developer: Codo Technologies
- Publishers: NA: Namco Hometek; EU: Atari Europe
- Producers: Pierre Roux; Mark W. Brown
- Designers: Julian Gollop; Gez Fry
- Programmers: Nick Gollop; Steve Moorhause
- Artists: Denis Istomin; Dmitry Chernenko
- Platform: Game Boy Advance
- Release: NA: September 6, 2005; AU: October 6, 2006; EU: October 13, 2006
- Genre: Tactical role-playing game
- Modes: Single-player, multiplayer

Rebelstar: Tactical Command is a turn-based tactics video game developed by Codo Technologies and published by Namco Hometek for the Game Boy Advance in 2005. It is the fourth game in the Rebelstar series. The game was created by Julian Gollop, who previously designed UFO: Enemy Unknown, Laser Squad and the original Rebelstar games.

== Gameplay ==
A gameplay screenshot of Rebelstar: Tactical Command

Unlike in UFO: Enemy Unknown, but similar to the original Rebelstar games, there is no base building, resource management or research. During combat, the player controls a squad of single-character units and must accomplish various goals. Units have a certain number of action points, which are renewed at the beginning of every turn. Each action, from turning to walking to shooting consumes action points. Therefore, they are only allowed to perform a certain number of actions per turn.

The player may also pick up and use weapons from dead enemies and allies. As ammunition is limited, it is sometimes necessary to loot a corpse in order to keep fighting. As units specialize in different areas, it is important to adopt a strategy that will fully utilize the strength of each of the many weapons used. It is also possible for a character to act as a medic, using a medikit to heal comrades.

Every time a unit damages an enemy, heals an ally, or uses psionics, it gains experience points. Once they have enough, they gain a level which raises their attributes such as strength, constitution, and intelligence at random. They also gain one skill point which the player can assign to a skill of their choosing, such as heavy weapons, hand-to-hand combat, medicine or stealth. Thus, as the game progresses, each unit becomes stronger and they may specialize in a type of weapon or skill above all others.

== Plot ==
In the year 2117, a race of aliens known as the Arelians have enslaved the human population of Earth using their henchmen, the savage Zorn. They insert implants into infants' brains at birth, to be able to track them. As soon as someone turns 30, the aliens take the person away and nothing is known about their subsequent fate.

The main character, Jorel, after losing both his parents to the alien invaders, decides to flee south to Mexico to join the rebel forces and fight the alien invaders. Thanks to his strong psionic resistance, his brain rejected the implant and he brings new hope to the desperate human race looking for a leader.

Later, the true nature of the Arelians and the Zorn is revealed. The Arelians, bored of the collective mind of the alien race, enslaved the humans for entertainment. The Zorn, in return for helping the Arelians, were to be allowed to eat any human above the age of 30.

== Reception ==
Rebelstar: Tactical Command

Aggregate scores
Aggregator	Score
GameRankings	77.83%
Metacritic	78%

Review scores
Publication	Score
GameSpot	7.8/10
GameSpy	4/5
IGN	7.7/10

Rebelstar: Tactical Command was well received, having an average score of 77.83% at GameRankings. It received positive reviews from GameSpot (7.8/10), GameSpy (4/5) and IGN (7.7/10). The game was praised for adapting the combat mechanics of the highly detailed and acclaimed PC strategy series but also received criticism for sub-par presentation, a lacklustre storyline, and lack of link-mode support. Gamefan gave a positive retro review, and cited the plot and the gameplay as its highlights.

== Cancelled sequel ==
The game was supposed to be followed by the cancelled sequel Rebelstar 2: The Meklon Conspiracy.
