= UFO: Enemy Unknown =

1994 video game

- Original European release cover art
- Developers: Mythos Games; MicroProse
- Publisher: MicroProse
- Producer: Tim Roberts
- Designers: Julian Gollop; Nick Gollop; Steve Hand
- Programmers: Julian Gollop; Nick Gollop
- Artists: John Reitze; Martin Smillie; Julian Gollop
- Composer: John Broomhall
- Series: XCOM
- Platforms: DOS, Amiga, CD32, PlayStation, Windows
- Release: March 1994: DOS; EU: March 1994; NA: May 1994 Amiga; EU: Early 1994 PlayStation; NA: October 1995; EU: November 1995 Windows; NA: 1998
- Genres: Strategy, turn-based tactics
- Mode: Single-player

UFO: Enemy Unknown (original title), also known as X-COM: UFO Defense in North America, is a 1994 science fiction strategy video game developed by Mythos Games and MicroProse. It was published by MicroProse for DOS and Amiga computers, the Amiga CD32 console, and the PlayStation. Originally planned by Julian Gollop as a sequel to Mythos Games' 1988 Laser Squad, the game mixes real-time management simulation with turn-based tactics. The player takes the role of commander of X-COM – an international paramilitary and scientific organisation secretly defending Earth from an alien invasion. Through the game, the player is tasked with issuing orders to individual X-COM troops in a series of turn-based tactical missions. At strategic scale, the player directs the research and development of new technologies, builds and expands X-COM's bases, manages the organisation's finances and personnel, and monitors and responds to UFO activity.

Despite its troubled development, including having been almost cancelled twice, the game received strong reviews and was commercially successful, turning into a runaway sleeper hit and acquiring a cult following among strategy fans; several publications have listed Enemy Unknown as one of the best video games ever made, including IGN ranking it as the best PC game of all time in 2007. It was the first and best-received entry in the X-COM series and has directly inspired several similar games. An official remake of the game, XCOM: Enemy Unknown, was published in 2012, and subsequently regarded as also being one of the greatest games of all time.

== Plot ==
The story of UFO: Enemy Unknown, set in the near-future at the time of the game's release, begins in the year 1998. The initial plot centres on increased reports of UFO sightings as tales of abductions and rumors of attacks by mysterious aliens become widespread. The nations of the world come to perceive this as a threat and attempt to form their own forces – such as Japan's Kiryu-Kai force – to deal with the crisis, but these efforts are unsuccessful. On 11 December, 1998, representatives from some of the most powerful nations in the world secretly meet in Geneva to discuss the issue. From this meeting is born the clandestine defence and research organisation Extraterrestrial Combat (X-COM), over which the player assumes control at the start of the game.

In the beginning, the player will only have access to conventional weapons, but as the game progresses, the player learns more about the enemy, their species, mutated creations, and technology. It is ultimately revealed that the "leaders" behind the alien invasion are a race known as Ethereals which possess powerful mind control abilities and enslave other races of aliens to perform their bidding and that their main base in the Solar System is located in Cydonia region of Mars. The player must then prepare the final assault team, attack Cydonia and destroy the mastermind behind the alien invasion, the biocomputer Alien Brain.

The game may end in several ways. If the player's performance is poor or worse for two consecutive months, the player runs a deep deficit for two consecutive months, all the player's bases are captured, or the player mounts an assault on the aliens' Mars base and loses, the game ends in defeat (in the PC version, the funding nations sign pacts with the aliens promising peace, but the aliens instead destroy every city and poison the water and air to destroy any resistance, the remaining survivors are put in slave camps to help reverse-terraform Earth for future alien colonisation; in the PlayStation version, the council of funding nations makes a futile attempt to negotiate with the aliens, who violently murder the negotiator). If, however, the player is victorious in the final attack, the game ends in mankind's victory.

== Gameplay ==
The game takes place within two distinct views, called the Geoscape and the Battlescape. As described by GameSpy, UFO: Enemy Unknown "...melds an SSI Gold Box RPG with a highly detailed 4X game like Master of Orion, making it in some ways two entirely different games."

=== Geoscape ===
A gameplay screenshot of the continuous-time strategic scale Geoscape mode, with the game's main menu to the right

The game begins on 1 January, 1999, with the player choosing a location for their first base on the Geoscape screen: a global view representation of Earth as seen from space (displaying X-COM bases and aircraft, detected UFOs, alien bases, and sites of alien activity). The player can view the X-COM bases and make changes to them, equip fighter aircraft, order supplies and personnel (soldiers, scientists and engineers), direct research efforts, schedule manufacturing of advanced equipment, sell alien artefacts on black market to raise money, and deploy X-COM aircraft to either patrol designated locations, intercept UFOs, or send X-COM ground troops on missions using transport aircraft.

Simultaneously, the aliens may run various activities, from research missions designed to collect data about the Earth and its inhabitants, to searching for and attacking X-COM bases, to establishing their own bases, to terror attacks on cities with the aim of convincing governments to reduce X-COM's funding. The escalating alien activities need to be uncovered and countered, mostly by detecting and shooting down the alien crafts and sending ground troops to investigate and salvage the UFO landing and crash sites.

Funding is provided by the 16 founding nations of X-COM. At the end of each month, a funding report is provided, where nations can choose to increase or decrease their level of funding based on their perceived progress (or failure) of the X-COM project, in particular the UFO activities in their areas. Any of these nations may quit if the nation's government has been infiltrated by the invaders. Through reverse engineering of recovered alien artefacts, X-COM is able to develop better technology to combat the alien menace and eventually uncover how to defeat it.

=== Battlescape ===
A gameplay screenshot of the turn-based Battlescape tactical combat mode, showing an Alien Terror-type mission in urban environment (Click on the image for a more detailed description.)

Gameplay switches to the tactical combat phase whenever X-COM ground forces come in contact with aliens. Each ground mission takes place within a procedurally-generated, voxel-based 3D map, evenly divided into square-bottom cubes and vertical layers for gameplay purposes. However, the actual game world is only used internally by the game engine for line of sight and firing calculations and is hidden from the player. Instead, it is presented in a symbolic form using isometric-view 2D bitmap graphics. It also features a highly destructible environment where almost all game objects and the landscape itself can be damaged or destroyed by weaponry.

The Battlescape's turn-based system uses action points, known in the game as Time Units (TUs), that are distributed between individual soldiers according to their statistics (including the total weight of carried equipment relative to their strength, and the top and current levels of stamina). Each turn, their TUs can be spent for movement and a variety of actions (through an icon-based GUI), such as firing weapons, managing their equipment including ammunition (items carried in hands, pockets, belt, and backpack), picking up or throwing objects (limited in this to friendly or enemy equipment or bodies), kneeling down, using items, reloading weapons, and priming explosives. Shooting options include a snap shot, an aimed shot, and possibly a burst if a given weapon has an autofire mode. Some weapons can also be loaded with non-standard types of ammunition (such as high-explosive rounds or incendiary rockets) and some are non-lethal for capturing aliens alive. A major feature called Opportunity Fire enables combatants to automatically shoot at a spotted hostile during the enemy turn if enough of their TUs have been reserved and left unspent.

The combat is highly unpredictable and often challenging, especially for new players. Soldiers are vulnerable to alien attacks even when armored (a single shot from an alien has a good chance of bringing a soldier in perfect condition to death), and the features such as night-time combat (when the battlefield needs to be illuminated by flares or fires or else the soldiers can only spot an alien at a very short range), fog of war, and Opportunity Fire allows for alien sniper attacks and ambushes. The enemy comes in numerous forms, and the players that are new to the game will run into new kinds of aliens without any knowledge of their characteristics and capabilities beforehand. The course of skirmishes is also dictated by the individual fatigue and morale levels of their participants on both sides; a low morale can result in them either dropping their weapons and fleeing in panic or going berserk and opening fire indiscriminately. Smoke obscures vision and drains stamina, and fires are a hazard for both sides. Injuries may be sustained to different body parts, differently affecting the wounded soldiers' statistics (and thus performance), and often result in the states of unconsciousness or bleeding, the latter leading to death if they are not treated or if the mission is not finished in time.

One of three mission outcomes is possible: either the human forces are eliminated, the alien forces are neutralised, or the player chooses to withdraw. The mission's score and the result are based on the number of X-COM operatives lost (either dead, unconscious, or under alien control), the AI-controlled civilians saved or perished, aliens killed or captured, and the number and quality of alien artefacts obtained. Troops may also increase in rank or abilities if they made successful use of their primary attributes (e.g., killing enemies). Instead of gaining experience points, surviving human combatants might get an automatic rise (a semi-random amount depending on how much of the action in which they participated) to their attributes, such as Psi or Accuracy. The soldiers who have been killed on a mission will remain dead, but can be replaced with raw recruits back at base. In addition to combat personnel, the player may use unmanned ground vehicles that are outfitted with heavy weapons and well armored but large, costly, and not gaining experience.

Recovered alien artefacts can then be researched and possibly reproduced. Captured live aliens may produce information, possibly leading to new technologies and even an access to psionic warfare. In it, some aliens possess mind control abilities that can be used to temporarily take control of human soldiers or cause them to panic. After capturing a mind control-capable alien, the player will be able to train soldiers in using these same abilities against the aliens.

== Development ==
The game was originally conceived by a small British independent video game developer, Mythos Games – led by Julian Gollop – as a sequel to their 1988 science fiction tactical game Laser Squad, "but with much neater graphics using an isometric style very similar to Populous." The initial 1991 demo presented a relatively simple, two-player tactical game then known as Laser Squad 2 (or Laser Squad II), which ran on the Atari ST. Due to bad experiences with Blade Software in selling their previous game, Lords of Chaos, the Gollop brothers (Julian and Nick) approached three other video game publishers, British Krisalis Software and Domark and the international MicroProse, eventually brokering a deal with MicroProse. Julian Gollop was especially happy about it because he greatly respected MicroProse and believed it was probably the best video game company in the world at the time.

When we first got the contract with MicroProse we were very pleased but concerned about what they might require us to do. We did have a few arguments in the beginning because they didn't understand the game design I had written. [...] I had a tough job trying to explain it, and I had to produce a few more documents and attend a big meeting with their in-house designers, producers and head of development.

— Julian Gollop

Although supportive of the project, the publisher expressed concerns that the demo lacked a grand scale in keeping with MicroProse's hit strategy game Civilization. The Civilopedia feature of Civilization also inspired an addition of the in-game encyclopaedia, called the UFOpaedia. All that and the UFO theme was suggested by the MicroProse UK head of development Pete Moreland. Julian Gollop's personal inspirations included several traditional games, in particular, the board wargame Sniper! and the tabletop role-playing game Traveller.

Under MicroProse's direction and working at its Chipping Sodbury studio, Julian Gollop said that while the research and technology tree somewhat emulates the role of advances in Civilization, "it also helped to develop the storyline." He changed the setting to modern-day Earth and expanded the strategy elements, among them the ability to capture and reproduce alien technology. He has cited the 1970s British television series UFO as one of the influences for the game's storyline, in particular, an idea of an international counter-UFO organisation and the psionic powers of some alien races, even as the series itself was "a bit boring". A book by Bob Lazar, where he describes his supposed work with recovered UFOs at Area 51, inspired the concept to reverse-engineer captured alien technology. Timothy Good's 1991 book Alien Liaison provided inspiration for several of Julian Gollop's revisions, such as the notion that world governments might seize alien technology or secretly conspire with the invaders (a negative result which can occur in-game). His sources of inspirations for the game also included Whitley Strieber's book Communion and other "weird American stories".

MicroProse UK graphics artists John Reitze and Martin Smillie provided what MicroProse described as "popular 'manga' look and feel" visuals. Julian Gollop credited Reitze, who also designed the alien races, with "a distinctive comic book style", and Smillie with "very detailed environment graphics". MicroProse musician John Broomhall, inspired by Bernard Herrmann's score in the film Psycho, composed the original soundtrack of the PC version while Andrew Parton handled the sound effects. Besides Moreland, there were other MicroProse employees not acknowledged in the game's credits despite having been major contributors to its development, such as assisting designers Mike Brunton and (especially) Steve Hand. Hand, a Laser Squad fan who helped the project get signed, put input into the "big game" concept by inventing the Geoscape interface, actually came up with the name X-COM (derived from Brunton's initial idea of X-CON, where "CON" originally stood for "contact"), and helped to define the comic book-like art style. Hand thought the initial artworks showed by Julian Gollop had aliens that were too "boring or comical", and that the original design document was poorly written, especially regarding the initial, more interactive and action-oriented UFO interception system; nevertheless, the final game turned out to be very close to it. Certain creature types deemed boring were removed during the development, as were the Men in Black, who have been left unused due to a perceived conflict with MicroProse's abortive project to make an MIB-themed standalone game.

A public demo of the game was released in Europe under the name UFO: Enemy Unknown in April 1994, and in North America in May 1994 under the then-working title X-COM: Terran Defense Force. Despite numerous changes from the first demo, the tactical part of the game remains true to the turn-based layout of Laser Squad and the Gollop brothers' earlier Rebelstar series. The AI system of those games formed the basis for enemy tactics, with Julian Gollop programming his own unique algorithms for pathfinding and behavior; in particular, the aliens were purposely given an element of unpredictability in their actions. It was the first game programmed by them for the PC. In retrospect, Julian thought he should have concentrated on game design and left all of the programming work to Nick.

The original contract was for the game be completed within 18 months, granting the Gollops £3,000 per month. In the course of its development, the game was nearly canceled twice: in the first instance due to the company's financial difficulties, and the second time under the pressure from the American combat flight simulator company Spectrum HoloByte after it had acquired Bill Stealey's shares in MicroProse in 1993. Julian Gollop said the MicroProse quality assurance team (testers Andrew Lucket, Phil McDonnel and Jason Thompson) helped save the game from its first would-be cancellation; their enthusiastic feedback also helped to polish the game. At one point, the game was officially ordered to be cancelled by Spectrum HoloByte. According to Moreland, Spectrum head Gilman Louie personally insisted on this order and rejected Moreland's objections. However, Moreland held a meeting with other MicroProse UK bosses Adrian Parr and Paul Hibbard, where they decided to ignore it and would simply not inform the Gollop brothers and others involved in the project about any of that. Thus, the development team continued their work without any knowledge of the parent company's executives. MicroProse producer Tim Roberts, assigned to oversee the game, was described by Julian Gollop positively as "very laid back" and for most of the time allowed them to work on the game without any interference and schedules, only checking in once in a month to conduct meetings in a pub.

During the final three months, after Spectrum HoloByte was eventually informed of the game still being in production, the Gollop brothers were forced to work 7–12 in order to finish it before the end of the fiscal year. The game was completed in March 1994, after 30 months in development since the initial contract and 12 months behind the schedule. The overall development of the PC version cost £115,000.

== Release ==
The finished product was originally marketed as UFO: Enemy Unknown in Europe, Quebec and Australia and as X-COM: UFO Defense in North America. The latter features a different box cover, faithful to the game's contents (the original cover of UFO: Enemy Unknown depicts the aliens and their spacecraft design that are unlike anything actually seen in the game). In Japan, the game was renamed by Culture Brain as X-COM Michi Naru Shinryakusha (X-COM 未知なる侵略者, X-COM: Unknown Invaders) and released with a cover using a different art style and better reflecting the actual game content.

=== Ports and re-releases ===
The Amiga conversion in multiple version was quickly created by Julian Gollop's brother Nick and "it was quite tough because the Amiga wasn't quite as fast as PCs were becoming at that time." The Amiga OCS/ECS version displays lower quality graphics than the PC version and is missing light source shading during combat missions, but their sound quality is improved. The graphics are better in the AGA Amiga versions, including a CD-ROM variant for the Amiga CD32 that features new music composed by Matthew Simmonds. A limited edition of the Amiga 1200 release also came with a MicroProse travel alarm clock.

The 1995 PlayStation port, released in Europe as X-COM: Enemy Unknown, has retained most of the original PC graphics due to time restraints (adding only some textured 3D models as illustrations for the UFOpaedia) but features much higher quality music than the 8-bit MIDI music of the PC version, replacing it 55 minutes of CD-quality tracks and 8 minutes of 16-bit tracks. The new soundtrack was composed by Allister Brimble, who later also created the music for the first sequel, X-COM: Terror from the Deep. The game is compatible with the (highly recommended) PlayStation Mouse and requires five PlayStation memory card blocks for a Battlescape saved game.

The game was re-released as part of the compilations X-COM: Unknown Terror by MicroProse and Prima Games in 1996, X-COM (Collector's Edition) by MicroProse in 1998, X-COM Collection by Hasbro Interactive in 1999, X-COM: Complete Pack by 2K Games in 2008 and 2K Huge Games Pack in 2009, as well as in the "Classic Games Collection" CD featured with the July 2000 issue of PC Gamer. In X-COM: Complete Pack (also known as X-COM Collection), all five X-COM games were released for paid download on Steam with added Windows XP and Windows Vista support.

=== Novelisations ===
Diane Duane's 1995 X-COM: UFO Defense – A Novel (ISBN 0-7615-0235-1) tells the story of Jonelle Barrett, commander of X-COM's newly established Swiss base. According to Rock, Paper, Shotgun's negative review of Duane's novel, it is hampered by a poor understanding of the game, a lack of focus, emotional resonance and tension, and an unstructured plot.

Another novelisation of the game, Враг неизвестен ("Enemy Unknown") written by Vladimir Vasilyev, was published in Russia in 1997. The book tells the story of one of the original eight X-COM troops from beginning of the conflict to the final raid on Cydonia.

=== Fan-created content ===
Fan-made patches fix a notorious bug which results in the game always resetting to the easiest difficulty level ("Beginner") after completing the first Battlescape mission, no matter what difficulty level has been selected. This glitch was not noticed by MicroProse and was not fixed in the official patches, resulting in the very high difficulty of the sequel due to many complaints from veteran players who believed that the original game was still too easy even on seemingly higher levels. The original release also contained many other bugs such as civilians appearing in inappropriate places, units being placed outside of the playable map area, and players being assigned alien and civilian units as playable. IBM Master Inventor Scott T. Jones' noted 1995 patch-turned-mod, named XComUtil, fixes it as well as addressing interface problems and better balancing the game; in 2010, a task of its further development was given to David Jones.

OpenXcom is an open-source reimplementation of the game, which aims to fix all the known bugs and limits, as well as improving the AI, and user interface. It also aims to localise the game in more languages, and to provide cross-platform builds, e.g., for Linux and Android. The second focus of OpenXcom is to enable customising, modding and expansions, such as the total conversion X-Piratez.

== Reception ==
=== Immediate ===
Reception

Aggregate score
Aggregator	Score
GameRankings	PC: 94% PS: 93%

Review scores
Publication	Score
Computer Gaming World	PC: 5/5
Electronic Gaming Monthly	PS: 8.8/10 (9.5/9.5/8.5/8.0)
Game Informer	PS: 8.5/10
GameSpot	PC: 9.0/10
IGN	PC: 9.4/10; PS: 9.0/10
Next Generation	PS: 5/5
Amiga Action	Amiga: 9.2/10
Amiga Format	Amiga: 9.0/10, 9.0/10
Amiga Power	Amiga: 3.6/10 & 6.6/10; Amiga (AGA): 7.5/10 & 8.5/10
CU Amiga	Amiga: 8.5/10, 9.3/10; Amiga (AGA): 8.9/10
The One	Amiga: 7.3/10; Amiga (AGA): 8.9/10; CD32: 8.6/10

The game was released to very positive reviews and commercial success, selling more than 600,000 units (a large number at the time) on the PC DOS platform, not counting the later ports—for the Amiga platforms and the PlayStation—and re-releases. Half of the game's net sales were in the United States, a rarity for a European title at the time. Gollop has attributed the game's North American success to its title (X-COM), as the television series The X-Files had premiered a year earlier. More than 400,000 units were sold at full price, with little marketing from its publisher. Together with its sequel, X-COM: Terror from the Deep, its sales had passed 1 million copies by March 1997. The game earned the Gollop brothers just over £1 million in royalties. The game became very popular also in Russia, even as there were no royalties from that market as it was only distributed there via software piracy. In 1996, Computer Gaming World named it as the number one sleeper hit of all time.

Computer Gaming World rated the PC version of UFO: Enemy Unknown five stars out of five. Describing it as "one of those rare and dangerous games capable of drilling into your brain, putting a vice-grip on your imagination, and only releasing you when it has had enough," the magazine praised its detailed and varied combat system and lengthy gameplay, concluding "Resistance is futile". GameSpot review described UFO: Enemy Unknown as "a bona fide modern classic, standing proudly alongside Civilization and Populous as a benchmark in the evolution of strategy gaming." A preview of the PlayStation version in Next Generation called it "one of the best PC strategy games ever."

Amiga ports received lower ratings than the PC original (holding an average score of 93.60% at GameRankings), according to Amiga HOL database having averaged scores of 79% on the ECS/OCS Amigas, 82% on the AGA Amigas and 73% for the Amiga CD32 version. A common point of criticism for the floppy disk version was the need to frequently swap the disks in the Amiga systems not equipped with a hard disk drive, while the CD-ROM based CD32 version does not allow the users to save the progress of any other game without wiping out the save game of UFO. Nevertheless, a review in Amiga Action called it "easily the most original and innovative game in the history of the Amiga", a review in Amiga World called in "the shortest path to heaven" for a strategy gamer, and a review in CU Amiga of the 1997 budget range re-release called it the "game everyone loves".

Electronic Gaming Monthly stated of the PlayStation version that "any person who likes strategy games will fall in love with this title ... if you could afford to buy one game for the PS over the next year, X-COM would be it. It has it all and then some!" A reviewer for Next Generation criticised the PlayStation version for being little more than a straight port, arguing that the game could have been improved if the console's capabilities were used. However, he praised the game itself for sophisticated, enjoyable gameplay, and concluded that UFO: Enemy Unknown was "a smashing PC title, it's lost nothing of practical value in the translation, and makes a marvelous addition to the console market." GamePro disagreed, stating that "You have to be a major sim-freak to enjoy" UFO: Enemy Unknown, and saying that "It's an interesting and complex game about planet colonising, [sic] but the extensive manuals and one-dimensional music really bore you to alien tears after a while."

James V. Trunzo reviewed X-COM: UFO Defense in White Wolf Inphobia #51 (Jan., 1995), rating it a 5 out of 5 and stated that "X-Com is being blamed for broken marriages because of its addictive qualities, ballyhooed for Computer Game of the Year and praised by gamers, reviewers and even competitors. It deserves all the glory heaped upon it. It may not be the best game that ever existed, but I'm willing to bet that anyone who enjoys this type of game will place it in the top five he's ever played."

Computer Gaming World gave UFO: Enemy Unknown its Game of the Year award. PC Gamer US presented Enemy Unknown with its 1994 Best Strategy Game award. The editors wrote, that the game's "classic mix of action and strategy will have you hooked for hours, and made this one of the finest games of the year."

=== Retrospective ===
Edge called UFO: Enemy Unknown "the title that first brought turn-based wargaming to the masses." Soren Johnson, lead designer of Civilization IV, called UFO: Enemy Unknown "one of the cornerstones of strategy gaming." In the words of the Xbox creator Seamus Blackley, the game "has changed entertainment forever." It has been inducted into several halls of fame, including by Computer Gaming World in 2005, by GameSpot in 2003 (featured among The Greatest Games of All Time as "one of the defining games of the turn-based strategy genre"), and by IGN in 2007 ("if this game were a woman, we'd marry it").

Enemy Unknown has often appeared in top video game lists by various publications. Computer Gaming World ranked it as the 22nd (1996) and third (2001) best computer game of all time; the magazine's readers also voted it for tenth place in 2001. It was also ranked as the 48th game of all time by GamesMaster in 1996, as the 35th best video game of all time by GameSpy in 2001 ("stellar game design can withstand the test of time"), as the second best video game since 1992 by Finnish magazine Pelit in 2007, and as the 78th best video game "to play today" by Edge in 2009.

IGN named it as the number one top PC game of all time in 2000 while calling it "the finest PC game we have ever played", and 2007 ("there's still no PC game that can compete with [it]"), as well as ranking it as the second top "modern PC game" in 2009. IGN also included it on several lists of the best video games of all time on all platforms, including it at eighth place in 2003 ("a game that will live on in the annals of computer gaming history"), at 12th place in 2005 ("for us 1994 will always be remembered as the year of [UFO: Enemy Unknown]"), and at 21st place in 2007 ("one of the most memorable and perfectly executed strategy games ever seen"). PC Gamer ranked it as the seventh (1997), eighth (1998), third (2001), eighth (2005), tenth (in both 2007 and 2008, as a "truly groundbreaking game" that "still plays fresher than almost anything else that begs passage through these pages"), 11th (2010, the editors adding that everyone who would not vote for this game is "dead" to them) and 12th (2011, describing it as a "brilliant game whose individual elements have been copied many times but whose charm has never been duplicated") best PC game of all time; it was also voted at 15th place by the magazine's readers in 2000.

Polish web portal Wirtualna Polska listed it the 13th best Amiga game, as well as the third most addictive game "that stole our childhood"; it was also retrospectively ranked as the eighth best Amiga game by the Polish edition of CHIP. Next Generation listed UFO: Enemy Unknown as the 26th top console game of all time in 1996 ("breathed new live into turn-based strategy genre"), as well as the 37th in 1999 ("revamp[ed] the turn-based subgenre by strengthening the resource management elements and adding highly intuitive interface"). In 2012, while awaiting the remake, The Escapist ran a feature article declaring UFO: Enemy Unknown to be "the greatest game ever" while game designer Ken Levine named it as one of his all-time personal favorites. In 2015, Rock, Paper, Shotgun ranked it as the sixth best strategy game ever made ("in the thick of a terror mission, with [C]rysal[l]ids seeming to pour out of the walls, or in those last hours when you finally seem capable of taking the fight to the aliens, there's nothing else quite like [UFO: Enemy Unknown]").

One reason for the game's success is the strong sense of atmosphere it evokes. The game's Xenomorph-inspired alien race of Chryssalids was ranked as fourth on their 1999 list of best monsters in gaming by GameSpot, where Enemy Unknown was also described as "one of the scariest computer games ever." In 2012, including it among the most essential game of all time, 1UP.com commented that "with its unrivaled balance of tactics and tension, [UFO: Enemy Unknown] remains a masterpiece."

== Legacy ==
The success of the game resulted in several sequels and spin-off games, as well as many unofficial remake and spiritual successor titles, both fan-made and commercial, such as UFO: Alien Invasion and UFO: Extraterrestrials. Julian Gollop himself designed the third game in the X-COM series, 1997's X-COM: Apocalypse, which was also developed together by Mythos Games and MicroProse. The game also received an unofficial sequel in the 1997 expansion set Civ II: Fantastic Worlds for MicroProse's Civilization II, in a scenario set on the Phobos moon of Mars.

Mythos Games' and Julian Gollop's own original spiritual successor project, The Dreamland Chronicles: Freedom Ridge, was cancelled in 2001 and later partially turned into UFO: Aftermath by another developer. Gollop's new X-COM spiritual successor project, Phoenix Point, was released by Snapshot Games in 2019.

An official remake, titled XCOM: Enemy Unknown, was developed by Firaxis Games, led by MicroProse's co-founder Sid Meier. The game's prototype was actually a modernisation of the original, with all the classic gameplay features, but then gradually evolved into a completely "reimagined" version, having abandoned the Time Units system for a simpler and more cinematic gameplay centred around class abilities and use of cover. The game was released by 2K Games for Microsoft Windows, PlayStation 3 and Xbox 360 in October 2012, winning multiple Game of the Year awards. A retrospective article in Eurogamer compared both games with "a sort of objectivity (...) that hasn't been remotely possible over the last two decades of worshipping [UFO: Enemy Unknown] at its VGA shrine," seeing the original as "a game that can and will co-exist with rather than be supplanted by its remake. [UFO: Enemy Unknown] and XCOM are completely different games, both ingenious and both flawed in their own ways." In a positive review of the remake, GameSpy nevertheless left "the title of Best Game Ever with the original." Julian Gollop himself commented that "Firaxis did a terrific job with the new XCOM," although he "would have done things differently for sure. (...) I tried many times for many years to get a remake underway, but Firaxis finally did it. Also, there is a promising and more faithful remake called Xenonauts." The 2012 XCOM, too, was followed by its own sequel and spin-off games.

The game also had a big influence on the development team of the role-playing video game Fallout. Project director Tim Cain said they "all loved" the game and that the original version of Fallout (known as Vault 13, before the game was redesigned after they lost the GURPS license) had a very similar combat system.
