= Gill Man =

Gill Man may refer to:

- Gill-man, the titular creature of the Creature from the Black Lagoon series of movies
- A prehistoric creature allied with alien invaders in the strategy video game X-COM: Terror from the Deep
- Reptilian mermaids from the Aquaman cartoon "Goliaths of the Deep-Sea Gorge"
