= X-COM: Terror from the Deep =

1995 video game

- North American MS-DOS cover art
- Developer: MicroProse
- Publisher: MicroProse
- Producer: Stuart Whyte
- Designer: Stephen Goss
- Programmers: Bill Barna; Annette Bell; Nick Thompson
- Artists: Drew Northcott; Matthew Knott
- Writer: Alkis Alkiviades
- Composers: John Broomhall; Allister Brimble
- Series: X-COM
- Platforms: DOS, PlayStation, Windows
- Release: March 1995 (DOS); 1996 (PlayStation); 1998 (Windows)
- Genres: Real-time strategy, turn-based tactics
- Mode: Single-player

X-COM: Terror from the Deep is a strategy video game developed and published by MicroProse for the PC in 1995 and for the PlayStation in 1996. It is a sequel to UFO: Enemy Unknown (known as X-Com: UFO Defense in North America) and the second game of the X-COM series, this time taking the war against a renewed alien invasion into the Earth's oceans.

== Gameplay ==
X-COM: Terror from the Deep takes place mostly underwater, with base-building and combat all being submerged beneath the waves. This is also used as a plot device; all of the alien technology from the first game is unusable in salt water, forcing the player to capture and develop new technology.

Just like UFO: Enemy Unknown, the game consists of two parts. The first is the real time-based GeoScape, a global view of Earth where the player views alien and X-COM craft and bases, can hire and dismiss staff, buy and sell vehicles, weaponry, ammunition and items, and build and expand bases. The second part, the BattleScape, is used for combat between squads of aliens and humans, and takes the form of a turn-based battle from an isometric view.

Underwater battles use the same physics as the ground ones but certain weapons cannot be used on surface/land missions. The game features some mission types composing of multiple parts, such as alien shipping route terror attacks in which the first part is a battle of the upper floors of the ship while the second part takes places in the lower decks of the ship (all parts must be completed for these missions to be successful, and soldiers lost in previous parts do not appear in later parts). Aside from lengthy multi-part missions, map layouts are more complicated, there are several types of terror missions, and weapons carry fewer rounds in their magazines.

Difficulty levels were markedly increased compared to UFO: Enemy Unknown. A part of the reason for the enhanced difficulty is that players complained of the first game being too easy, however MicroProse were unaware that this was due to a bug that resulted in it reverting to Beginner mode in the released version. A new feature added in TFTD was melee weapons, thanks to feedback from the players who suggested the idea.

== Plot ==
Terror from the Deep is set in 2040, four decades after the events of UFO: Enemy Unknown. Following the destruction of the alien Brain on Cydonia, a transmitter remained active there which awakened a group of aliens under the Earth's seas who had lain dormant for millions of years. After awakening, the aliens proceed to terrorize seagoing vessels and port cities, kidnapping humans to perform bizarre genetic experiments on them. X-COM, which had been disbanded after the first alien war, is revived by the Earth's governments to fight this new menace as the aliens' ultimate goal is to reawaken their supreme leader, a being that cannot be stopped once revived.

Eventually, it is revealed the aquatic aliens, cousins of the Sectoids from Enemy Unknown, came to Earth on a massive spacecraft, known as T'Leth, that crashed into what is now the Gulf of Mexico 65 million years ago, causing the extinction of the dinosaurs. Destruction of T'Leth by the player results in victory but also accidentally results in another worldwide environmental cataclysm, destroying the ecosystem of Earth and setting the stage for the third game in the series, X-COM: Apocalypse.

== Development and release ==
MicroProse wanted the developer Mythos Games to make a sequel to UFO: Enemy Unknown in six months. Julian Gollop felt that the only way to do so was to change the graphics and make minor changes to the gameplay. Eventually, MicroProse licensed Mythos' code and their internal UK studio created Terror from the Deep within a year, while Mythos Games began developing the next sequel, Apocalypse.

MicroProse artist Terry Greer recalled: "A decision was made to use the original engine, reskin the graphics and create a whole new story. By keeping changes to the absolute minimum a sequel could be created in just a few months. Also, by not inventing any new game features or game technology it would make the scheduling one largely led purely by asset creation – which makes it whole lot easier when it comes to estimating task durations and scheduling." Simultaneously with making the console port of Terror, MicroProse UK also began work on their X-COM: Alliance project.

X-COM: Terror from the Deep was originally released on 1 June 1995 for the PC DOS. It was ported to the PlayStation in 1996. In 1998, a Windows 95 port was released with Enemy Unknown as part of the X-COM Collector's Edition. On 4 May 2007, the game was distributed on Steam by 2K Games, who has inherited the franchise (first only for the Windows XP, but a later update which enabled Windows Vista support).

The game has been re-released as part of the compilations X-COM Collector's Edition by MicroProse in 1998, X-COM Collection by Hasbro Interactive in 1999, X-COM: Complete Pack by 2K Games in 2008 and 2K Huge Games Pack in 2009. The fan-created OpenXCom project, originally an improved, modernized remake of the first game, also added TFTD support which fixed a number of bugs and programming oversights in the original game, including better enemy AI.

== Reception ==
Reception

Review scores
Publication	Score
GameSpot	7.2/10
Next Generation	4/5
PC Gamer (UK)	92%
PC Gamer (US)	82%
PC Zone	94%
Computer Game Review	97/98/95

Together with its predecessor, UFO: Enemy Unknown, Terror from the Deep's sales had passed 1 million copies by March 1997. The game was received mostly very well by critics. PC Gamer UK called it to be "not only a great sequel to UFO but a superb game in its own right." Computer Game Review offered a rave review and awarded the game a "Platinum Triad" score. On the other hand, GameSpot stated that "apart from new art and a handful of new combat options, this is exactly the same game as UFO Defense, only much more difficult." Next Generation felt the same: "In the end, X-COM 2 is still a phenomenal game, and has been scored as such, but it seems so much more could have been accomplished to make this game more than just a carbon copy of an old game."

Julian Gollop criticised MicroProse for "some classic mistakes in turn-based games, which is to make the difficulty too tough and the levels too big, long and tedious to get through." According to Jake Solomon, the lead designer of 2012's XCOM: Enemy Unknown, MicroProse did few new things with the sequel "except made it brutally harder and made the cruise ships four times longer than any human could realistically make," yet still the game "was awesome."

== See also ==
- List of underwater science fiction works
