= Tactical command =

Tactical command may refer to:

- Tactical Air Command, inactive U.S. Air Force organization
- Officer in tactical command, NATO designation for a naval officer exercising tactical command of a group of ships in a tactical formation
- Rebelstar: Tactical Command, video game

== See also ==
- Command and control
- Military tactics
- Category:Military tactics
