= Rebelstar =

Amstrad CPC cover of Rebelstar

The Rebelstar games are a series of turn-based tactics video games designed by Julian Gollop. Rebelstar Raiders was published in 1984 by Red Shift for the ZX Spectrum. It was reworked in machine code as Rebelstar, published by Firebird in 1986. A sequel, Rebelstar II, was published in 1989 by Silverbird. Rebelstar, but not its sequel, was also adapted for the Amstrad CPC home computer.

Each title in the Rebelstar series is a science fiction-themed turn-based tactics game, in which each player controls an opposing squad of soldiers, using their individual action points for movement, attacking, and other activities. The playing area is top-down plan view, with units shown in profile. The games achieved critical acclaim, and formed the beginning of a development history that led to the Laser Squad and X-COM series.

A spiritual successor titled Rebelstar: Tactical Command was developed by Gollop's Codo Technologies and released for the Game Boy Advance by Namco in 2005. Two more Namco projects, Rebelstar: Psionic Rebellion and Rebelstar 2: The Meklon Conspiracy, were cancelled.

== Rebelstar Raiders ==
Rebelstar Raiders
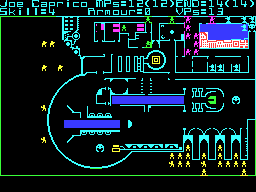
- Rebelstar Raiders scenario "Moonbase"
- Developer: Julian Gollop
- Publisher: Red Shift Ltd
- Platform: ZX Spectrum
- Release: 1984
- Genre: Turn-based tactics
- Mode: Multiplayer

Rebelstar Raiders was originally released for the 48k ZX Spectrum in 1984 by Red Shift Ltd, a war games publisher who had also released Julian Gollop's space strategy game Nebula. It was written in BASIC.

Rebelstar Raiders does not feature a computer-controlled opponent, so is strictly a two-player game. It includes three different scenarios, the maps for which are loaded in as a screen datum; thus the playing area is limited to the size of the screen. In each scenario, each player's units are deployed manually before play commences.

Combat can either be melee or ranged, which takes into account limited ammunition and line of sight. Damage is taken from a unit's 'endurance' statistic. If this is reduced below one fifth of its initial value, the unit is seriously wounded. If reduced to zero, the unit is destroyed. Units also have 'skill' and 'armour' values.

- The first scenario, "Moonbase", is the beginning of a storyline that runs through the whole series. The Raiders are attempting to destroy a vast organisation based on a planet called Pi. Before any of the Raiders ships can land on Pi, the planetary defenses on the moon, Spyder, must be destroyed. One player controls a squad of 24 Raiders, who are led by "the first of the Capricorn clones", Joe Capricorn. The Raiders' squad also includes Captain Krenon, a character who features in the two later Rebelstar games. The moonbase, which is disguised as a mining station, is defended by sentry robots, mining robots and auto-guns in pre-set locations, and deployable technicians and security guards. The Raiders win if one unit can get to the control room and destroy the sensitive equipment there.
- In the second scenario, "Starlingale", Joe Capricorn, Captain Krenon and a few other survivors have returned to their eponymous escape vessel. The ship is still undergoing hull repairs, and must be defended for 12 turns. The Red Shift player, controlling various robot operatives, must destroy the two Navcomps on the bridge to prevent takeoff. The Raider's units include the pre-deployed Starlingale pilots and plod-bots, 14 deployable Raiders, with eight Raiders arriving later as reinforcements. The Red Shift Operatives include zorbotrons (armed with gas bombs), fly-bots (armed with zeekers), slavers (with las-whips), a mining robot and two security guards.
- The third and final scenario, "The Final Assault", has the Starlingale join the Freedream on the surface of Pi. The Raiders must destroy eight parts of the Main-Comp in an underground shelter.

=== Reception ===
CRASH noted the detailed blueprint-style maps and their flexible layout and the strategic mix of different weapon types and unit deployment, but the sound effects were deemed irritating, and the packaging amateurish.

== Rebelstar ==
Rebelstar
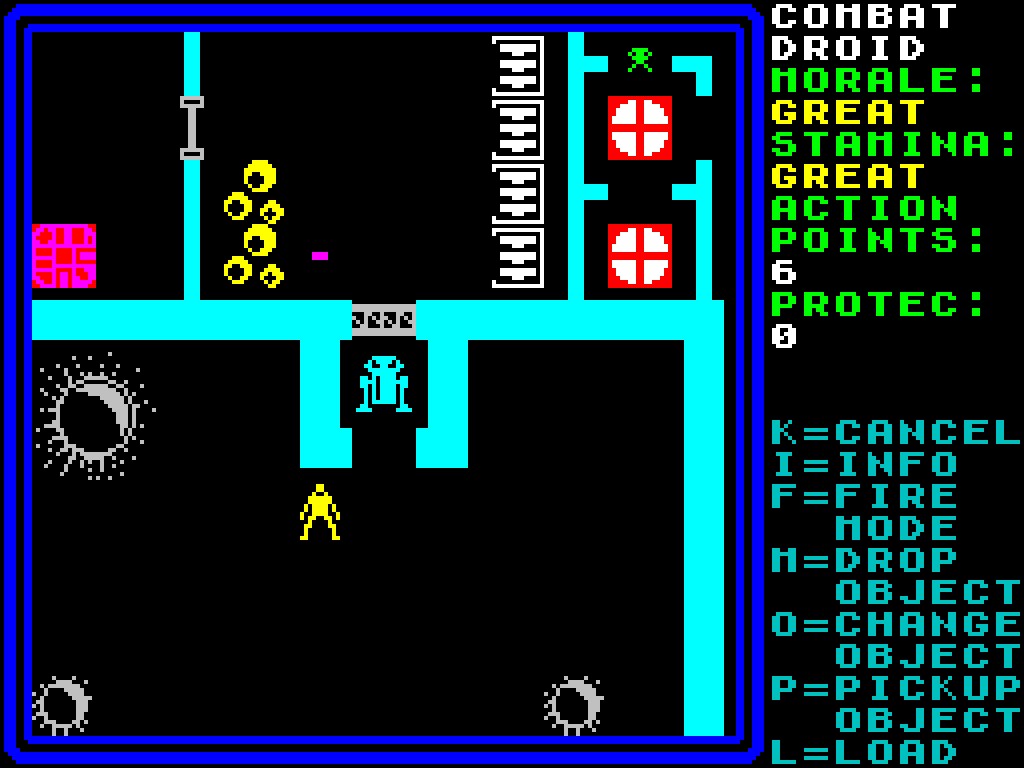
- Rebelstar on the ZX Spectrum
- Developer: Julian Gollop
- Publisher: Firebird Software
- Platforms: ZX Spectrum, Amstrad CPC
- Release: 1986
- Genre: Turn-based tactics
- Modes: Single-player, multiplayer

Rebelstar was originally published in 1986 by Telecomsoft's budget label, Firebird. Unlike its predecessor it was written in machine code, and featured a larger, scrolling playfield. The game supports single player and two player variants, and had overhauled game mechanics. Only one map is available.

Morale, stamina and encumbrance are new statistics for units, and ranged fire has the option of fast snapshots or more action-point consuming aimed shots. In addition, an "opportunity fire" system allows a player to interrupt their opponents turn with pre-targeted shots. Objects are more interactive than in Rebelstar Raiders, with units able to drop or collect weapons, ammunition, dead bodies, and other items. Some types of terrain may provide cover and slow units down. Wreckage of droids and dead bodies also cause partial obstructions.

The objective for the Raiders in Rebelstar is to destroy ISAAC, the computer responsible for breaking the Raiders' secret codes. The game can be won either by destroying ISAAC's central core, or by eliminating all enemy forces in the base. The player can gain reinforcements by destroying three Laser Defence Computers located around the base; this allows reinforcements to arrive a few turns later.

In the single player version, the difficulty level can be set from one to eight, each level increasing the number and power of the droid forces. The game has a built-in time limit, and the Raiders automatically lose if they fail to achieve either of their objectives within the time limit.

=== Reception ===
CRASH gave Rebelstar 93%, making it a Crash Smash. The magazine was impressed with the fast pace, challenging difficulty level, and clear graphics. The character graphics and individual morale and skills were felt to contribute towards the game's atmosphere. The reviewer pointed out some similarities with Snapshot, a module for the 1977 Game Designers' Workshop role playing game Traveller.

Rebelstar was also ranked as the second greatest Spectrum game of all time by Your Sinclair, which held Rebelstar as an example of how the wargaming genre could be "an experience unrivalled for thrills by all but the most adrenalin-pumping blaster". Both Your Sinclair and CRASH praised the decision to release the game at the budget price of £1.99.

It was one of 3 Spectrum games listed in the book 1001 Video Games You Must Play Before You Die.

== Rebelstar II ==
Rebelstar II
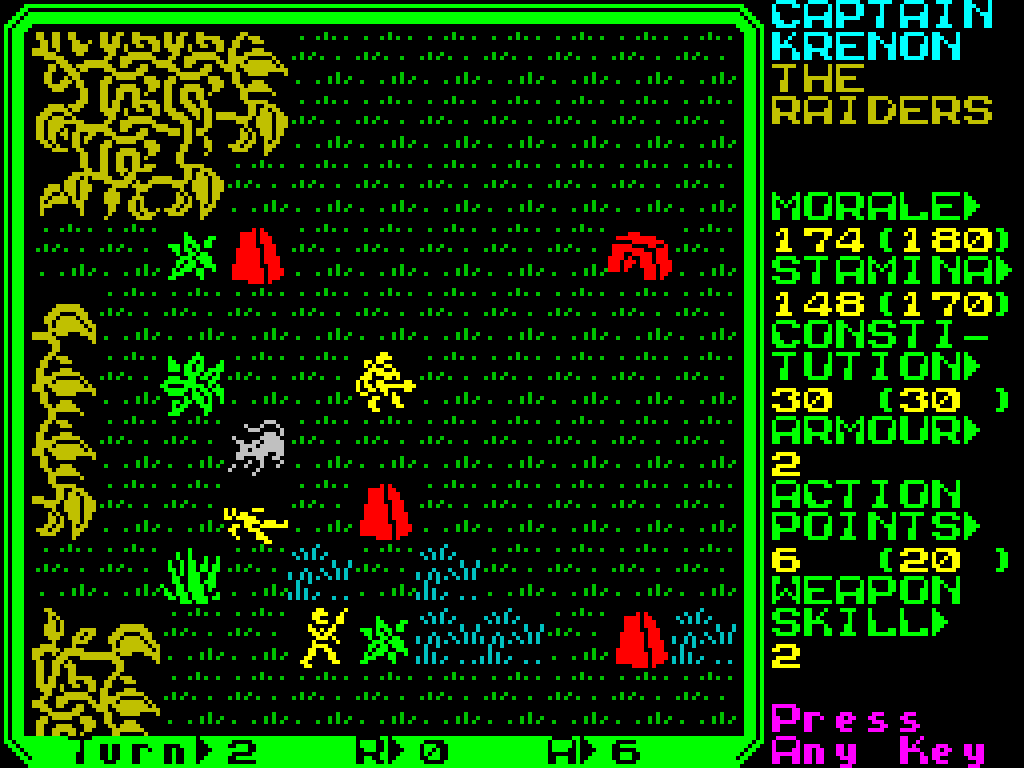
- Gameplay screenshot
- Developer: Target Games
- Publisher: Silverbird Software
- Designer: Julian Gollop
- Platform: ZX Spectrum
- Release: 1989
- Genre: Turn-based tactics
- Modes: Single-player, multiplayer

Rebelstar II (also known as Rebelstar II: Alien Encounter) was developed by Target Games and published in 1989 on Telecomsoft's Silverbird label (their rebranded budget range). Again, it was programmed by Julian Gollop, with Ian Terry providing graphical assistance.

The scenario takes place on the planet of Thray 6, on which an alien race is threatening Rebelstar. The Raiders' objective is to kill aliens, kill the alien queen, and capture alien eggs. The Raiders have a set escape window, with their shuttle landing on turn 15 and taking off on 26. At that point, the game ends and victory points compared. The left half of the map is an outdoor environment, with bushes, trees, rivers and marshes. The alien queen herself can fire a short-ranged but deadly acidic spit.

=== Reception ===
CRASH gave Rebelstar II an overall 90%, highlighting the excellent graphics and engrossing gameplay. The magazine also noted some similarities with the film Aliens, with the visual appearance of the antagonists, the storyline, and the names of some of the Raiders.

== Rebelstar: Tactical Command ==
Rebelstar: Tactical Command, a Game Boy Advance game released in 2005, was developed by Gollop's new studio Codo Technologies and released by Namco. It shares the Rebelstar name as well as many gameplay similarities, but is neither a remake of nor a sequel to the original. It was supposed to be followed by the cancelled sequel Rebelstar 2: The Meklon Conspiracy.

== Rebelstar: Psionic Rebellion (unreleased) ==
Rebelstar: Psionic Rebellion was a cancelled title by Kuju Entertainment for Namco and was expected to be released at the end of 2008 or early 2009 for Xbox 360 and PlayStation 3. Its look would be "mature, detailed, gritty and very stylish, similar to that of a western graphic novel".

== Legacy ==
Two other related games made by the same designer and sharing the same mechanics but in a fantasy setting are Chaos: The Battle of Wizards and Lords of Chaos. All three games in the series were re-released as part of The Rebelstar Collection, a compilation of Gollop's games published in 1991 by Mythos Games. This compilation also included Chaos and Nebula. Many of the features and ideas in this series would go on to be used by Gollop in the Laser Squad and X-COM series of games.
