= Your Sinclair =

British computer magazine

- Issue 1, January 1986
- Editor: Roger Munford (1984–85); Kevin Cox (1985–87); Teresa Maughan (1987–89); Matt Bielby (1989–91); Andy Ide (April–November 1991); Andy Hutchinson (1991–92); Linda Barker (1992–93); Jonathan Nash (May–September 1993)
- Categories: Computer magazines, Videogame magazines
- Frequency: Monthly
- Circulation: over 65,000
- First issue: January 1984 (as Your Spectrum), January 1986 (as Your Sinclair)
- Final issue Number: September 1993; 93 (114 including the 21 Your Spectrum)
- Company: Dennis Publishing; Future plc
- Country: United Kingdom
- Language: English
- ISSN: 0269-6983

Your Sinclair, originally Your Spectrum or YS, is a discontinued British computer magazine for the Sinclair range of computers, mainly the ZX Spectrum. It was commercially published between 1984 and 1993.

== History ==
The magazine was launched in January 1984 as Your Spectrum by Sportscene Specialist Press. (Sportscene would later be renamed to Dennis Publishing in April 1987.)

Initially, it was published bimonthly, changing to monthly in June 1984. With the January 1986 issue, the title was relaunched as Your Sinclair, with the intention of expanding coverage of the QL into the main magazine (previously, QL User had been a pull-out section within the magazine), and any future computers produced by Sinclair. However, the magazine remained focused almost entirely on the ZX Spectrum games scene.

In 1990, the magazine was sold to Bath-based Future plc, and the April 1990 issue was the first to be published by the new company. That issue's news section contained a feature on the change in publishers, which jokingly suggested that Future had intended to buy a Sinclair C5 and had ended up buying the magazine by mistake.

Publishing of the magazine ended in September 1993, after the commercial life of the Spectrum ended and the magazine had shrunk to fewer than forty pages per issue. A 94th issue, a retrospective on the magazine, was published in 2004 and given away free with Retro Gamer magazine. It featured interviews with some of the writers and reviewers from across the magazine's history, a four-page memoir written by former staff writer Phil South, and several new reviews and tips, keeping the style of the original magazine throughout.

The magazine introduced a unique writing style, inspired by launch editor Roger Munford and expanded upon by subsequent editors and writers. Influences can be found in titles ranging from Private Eye to Viz. Towards the end of the magazine's life, and particularly under the editorship of Jonathan Nash, the style was further influenced by magazines YS had itself inspired, in particular Amiga Power and fanzine The Thing Monthly.

The original 1986 Your Sinclair team included Kevin Cox (editor), Teresa "T'zer" Maughan (deputy editor), Sara Biggs (production editor), Pete Shaw (editorial assistant), and Phil "Snouty" South (writer). Marcus Berkmann joined as staff writer in early 1987 when Maughan took over as editor. Freelance writers of the time included John Minson (writing under various pseudonyms, including Sue Denham, Gwyn Hughes and Rachael Smith), Mike Gerrard, Max Phillips, Tony Worrall and David McCandless. The final 1993 team consisted of just two permanent staff members: Jonathan Nash (editor) and Andy Ounsted (art editor). Steve Anderson, Rich Pelley, Tim Kemp, Simon Cooke, Dave Golder and Simon Forrester were among those working on a freelance basis.

== Content ==
YS's content varied widely, occasionally ignoring the subject of computers entirely. As the Spectrum scene diminished and there was less software to review, this happened more frequently. The tone of the magazine was inspired by teenage magazines such as Smash Hits and Just Seventeen. In 1992, under the editorship of Andy Hutchinson, several 'lifestyle' type sections were introduced. These included Haylp!, an agony aunt column, and The World (later retitled Flip!), which contained reviews of films and books. This section included The Killer Kolumn From Outer Space, dedicated to science fiction news, rumours and reviews. It was written by Dave Golder, who went on to be the second editor of the successful SFX. Writing in the 100th issue of that publication, Golder cited his earlier work on YS and described SFX as "like hundreds of Killer Kolumns stapled together". Flip! was discontinued, but the Killer Kolumn was kept on until the penultimate issue in 1993. A similar page to Flip!/The World had existed in 1987–88 called Street Life, but this had also contained Spectrum game charts.

=== Pssst/Frontlines ===
The news section was originally called Frontlines and dealt with Sinclair news and rumours. It also regularly contained mock celebrity interviews (such as the "At The Bus Stop With..." series) and trivial charts, as well as features about the writers themselves.

Subsections of Pssst and Frontlines included T'zers, a column which contained rumours about possible forthcoming releases for the Spectrum and, later on, the SAM Coupé. It was named after and originally written by Teresa Maughan, but the column remained after she left the magazine, as it was felt 'T'zers' was an appropriate title since it contained 'teasers' for future games. Rock Around The Clock, which first appeared in 1991, was a small column dedicated to looking at a particular back issue, as well as news and current affairs from the same time.

Perhaps one of the odder sections of Pssst was the Peculiar Pets Corner. Editor Matt Bielby originally intended this to be a showcase for YS readers' exotic pets such as snakes, pigs, monkeys or spiders, but these "pets" also included such things as a purple fruit gum and a tuba.

When an editor or member of the writing staff left, the magazine would often concoct fanciful stories surrounding their leaving. Matt Bielby was carted off to the funny farm after declaring himself to be God, Andy Ide became a Green Party ambassador, and Andy Hutchinson left to design a skate park at Alton Towers. In actuality, the majority of ex-YS staff went on to work for other magazines, such as Amiga Power.

The final issue of Your Sinclair, September 1993

=== Reviews ===
Your Sinclair's reviewing system varied throughout the magazine's life. During the Your Spectrum era, game reviews were confined to the Spectrum Soft section, later called Joystick Jury. Games were reviewed by a panel of reviewers and given a mark out of 10. In practice this was a score out of 9, since no game ever received a perfect 10, on the rationale that a better game could come along at a later date. After the name change to Joystick Jury, games were judged by each individual reviewer out of five and also as a 'hit' or a 'miss' (in the manner of television show Juke Box Jury, after which it was named). The hit and miss system was abandoned with Issue 19, and with the transition to Your Sinclair, the review section was renamed Screen Shots. In Screen Shots, games were rated out of ten, but they were also given separate ratings for graphics, playability, value for money and addictiveness. They were also now reviewed by individual writers, rather than a panel.

In 1988, Joystick Jury was superseded by Joystick Jugglers, and the familiar cartoons of reviewers were introduced. Screen Shots was removed as a self-contained section in 1989, and reviews began to appear throughout the magazine, generally with the bigger games being reviewed towards the front. Budget games had their own section, Bargain Basement (later replaced with Replay when it was felt that original budget games should be reviewed alongside full price games). The magazine also began using a rating out of 100, rather than ten, when reviewing games. However, this was referred to as a 'degree scale' rather than a percentage scale, with a graphic of a thermometer representing the rating; the higher the rating, the "hotter" the game. Reviewer Jon Pillar embraced both extremes of the review scale, giving Count Duckula 2 a mere 9˚ and Mercenary 99˚. The final change in review style came in late 1992 when the various ratings for addictiveness, graphics, and so forth were replaced by a summary of the game's good and bad points, with an overall mark (now as a percentage) below that.

Back cover of final issue. "Our work here is done."

Games which were scored at more than 90˚/90%, or 9/10 before the degree scale was introduced, were awarded YS's coveted "Megagame" status, though this was undermined slightly when Duncan MacDonald gave it to his own deliberately bad Sinclair BASIC creation, Advanced Lawnmower Simulator, in a moment of surreal humour. The logo was used in advertisements for games, big and small. Reader games were also reviewed for a while in the "Crap Games Corner", many being inspired by Advanced Lawnmower Simulator or being just as deliberately bad. Good reader games sometimes ended up on the covertape.

YS reviewers were often 'interviewed' in a column at first called Joystick Jury (the same as the reviews section in Your Spectrum), then Joystick Jugglers, and finally (when there were fewer games to review and they wanted to introduce the team as a whole, including design staff) The Shed Crew, a reference to the recurring joke that after the move to Future Publishing, their office was now a garden shed. The Jugglers were depicted with caricatures mostly drawn by Nick Davies, although some writers (such as Jon Pillar/Jonathan Nash) drew their own and art editor Andy Ounsted drew most of the latter reviewers. The Juggler caricatures took on something of a life of their own, and in 1990, a game, YS Capers, was given away with the magazine in which you had to shoot the YS crew, depicted in their cartoon forms.

=== Tipshop ===
Originally, the tips section of the magazine was called Hack Free Zone, to distinguish it from Hacking Away, which was dedicated to type-in POKEs. Hacking away was written by Chris Wood and "ZZKJ", while Hex Loader was written by Phil South under the pseudonym of Hex Loader. The sections were merged in 1987 to become the Tipshop.

It contained all tips, cheats and complete solutions sent in by readers, and spawned its own book, the YS Tipshop Tiptionary. Dr. Berkmann's Clinic (renamed The YS Clinic With Dr. Hugo Z Hackenbush after Marcus Berkmann left to go freelance), originally set up to provide help for the game Head Over Heels, allowed readers to provide solutions to each other's gaming problems, more often than not solved by Richard Swann. Practical Pokes, hosted mainly by Jon North, was the successor to Hacking Away, and contained both type-in and Multiface POKEs. The Tipshop was hosted variously by Phil South, David McCandless, Jonathan Davies and Linda Barker.

=== Technical sections ===
While YS is often thought of as primarily a games magazine, throughout its life it hosted a variety of technical columns, mainly dedicated to programming technique.

Program Pitstop, first hosted by David McCandless, then Jonathan Davies and finally Craig Broadbent, contained type-in programs and was one of the last columns of its kind, a remnant of an era when computer magazines would dedicate entire sections to BASIC program listings. Most of the programs were in Sinclair BASIC, although some were in hexadecimal machine code, for which a special interpreter, the Hex Loader, was written. It replaced the pull-out section Program Power; the main difference was that Program Pitstop mainly included listings for utility programs and demos (for example, a level editor for games such as Atari's Gauntlet), while Program Power also included games. Program Pitstop also featured contributions from well known programmers, such as the Rainbow Processor by Dominic Robinson, which allowed the Spectrum to display more than two colours per character.

Spec Tec (Adam Waring) and its descendant Spec Tec Jr (Simon Cooke) were home to readers' technical queries. The introduction to these columns were typically written in the style of a Philip Marlowe monologue, occasionally including ongoing plots.

Other technical columns included Rage Hard, an occasional page which brought news of peripherals and other enhancements for the Spectrum; Steve's Programming Laundrette, in which Steve Anderson took the reader step-by-step through producing a BASIC game; and Simon Hindle's Dial Hard, which helped you connect a Spectrum to the Internet.

Before the magazine's relaunch as Your Sinclair in 1986, Your Spectrum contained a plethora of technical articles, including guides on programming in machine code and Forth, and information on how to upgrade the basic Spectrum set-up to incorporate better sound and more memory.

=== Letters ===
From the magazine's inception, letters were answered mainly by the magazine's editor. The letters page contained several subsections, which varied through the magazines' lifetime, but included:

- Small Print – either deliberately short letters, or parts of longer letters taken out of context, most often for comedy value.
- Doodlebugs – readers' cartoons, often based around puns on current Spectrum games (e.g. a cartoon based on the game Midnight Resistance showed a house with the bedroom light on and a speech bubble saying "Not tonight dear, I've got a headache"). Doodlebugs spawned one of YS's occasional comic strips, Ernie The Psychotic Madman, drawn by Phil McCardle.
- Kindly Leave The Stage – readers' jokes, often nonsensical or surreal (an example being Q: Why is an orange orange? A: Because you can't clean a window with a spade), and often met with a gong.
- Wonderful World of Speccy – letters from readers for whom English was not their first language, many from Eastern Europe, where the Spectrum scene was flourishing well into the early 1990s.
- Trainspotters – where readers would send in mistakes they had noticed in a previous issue of the magazine, in the hopes of convincing the editor to send them a Trainspotter Award. Most of the time, however, the editor found a way out of sending the award, by coming up with convoluted reasons why the 'mistake' wasn't a mistake at all (for example, by insisting there was no such place as the Isle of Man after accidentally omitting it from a map in Issue 50). The Trainspotter caricature was supposedly based on the man pictured on the cover of Issue 1 of Your Spectrum. As with the Jugglers, this was drawn by Nick Davies. The last-ever award was given to Stuart Campbell, a then-former writer who had since left, who found a mistake in a reprint of an article that he wrote.
- The Picos – a fictional family created for a series of columns in the letters page. Firstly there was Madame Pico, a psychic and agony aunt who answered readers' problems with "ooh, you poor dear". After her kidnapping, her son Bud Pico, a DIY specialist, took over. His solutions to readers' DIY problems often involved Rice Krispies. After Bud's "death", the baton was passed to cousin Femto Pico, a scientist and nightclub bouncer, and finally, Femto's sister Soya Pico, a vegetarian hippy. Most of the letters to the Picos were fictional.
- Norman Tebbit's Dead Serious Corner (originally Peter Snow's Dead Serious Corner) – one of the last additions to the letters pages, containing, as the name suggests, more serious letters than the rest of the pages. These often dealt with consumer issues, such as the price of games, or declining software support for the Spectrum.

The Star Letter was awarded three full-price Spectrum games. When asked what qualities a star letter possessed, editor Linda Barker answered "A star letter is one that makes the entire Shed crew rock with mirth, or touches their hearts", although other editors had their own criteria for the type of letter they awarded Star Letter status to.

Like many later computer magazines (such as Zero and Amiga Power) Your Sinclair created a sense of community with its readers through the letters page, and many readers wrote in regularly, becoming almost part of the team themselves. Indeed, several letter writers went on to write for YS in a freelance capacity, including Leigh Loveday and Rich Pelley. Along with Jonathan Davies, Pelley had formerly written for the fanzine Spectacular, and both became regular contributors for the magazine between 1988 and 1993. After YS closed, Davies went on to become editor of Sega Zone, Amiga Power and PC Gamer, while Pelley regularly wrote articles for a number of magazines.

=== Cover tape ===
By October 1988, the magazine had committed itself to including a cover tape every month. Content typically included an older full game, and a specially made single-level demo of a new, high-profile game such as Cybernoid II or Power Drift. Other content included game soundtracks and user-submitted demos. In December 1988, the magazine became the first to include two tapes.

== Official Top 100 games ==
Between October 1991 and January 1992, contributor Stuart Campbell compiled his list of the Top 100 ZX Spectrum games of all time. In the months leading up to the final issue, readers were invited to vote on their ten favourite games, which was then compiled into a 'readers choice' top 100, which was published in the final issue alongside Stuart Campbell's list.

All-Time Top 30

Number	Readers choice	Official list
1	Chase HQ	Deathchase
2	Rainbow Islands	Rebelstar
3	R-Type	All or Nothing
4	SimCity	Stop the Express
5	Chaos	Head Over Heels
6	Manic Miner	R-Type
7	Elite (video game)	The Sentinel
8	Back To Skool	Rainbow Islands
9	RoboCop	Boulderdash
10	Deathchase	Tornado Low Level
11	Midnight Resistance	SimCity
12	Myth	Carrier Command
13	Target: Renegade	Chuckie Egg
14	Head Over Heels	Ant Attack
15	Mercenary	Lords of Midnight
16	Laser Squad	Elite
17	Lotus Esprit Turbo Challenge	Starquake
18	Spellbound Dizzy	Underwurlde
19	Quazatron	Back to Skool
20	Lemmings	Spy vs. Spy
21	Lords of Chaos	Alien
22	Knight Lore	Chase HQ
23	Skool Daze	The Great Escape
24	Space Crusade	Starstrike 2
25	Lords Of Midnight	Manic Miner
26	Operation Wolf	Lightforce
27	Starquake	Super Hang-On
28	Chuckie Egg	Deactivators
29	The Great Escape	Think!
30	Ant Attack	Nebulus

== YS2 ==
As reduced advertising and lack of material to review caused YS's page numbers to drop, the magazine introduced YS2, which was incorporated on the cover tape, and contained a teletext-like viewer program and a collection of around fifty extra pages of content largely written by then editor Jonathan Nash and regular contributor Steve Anderson. It contained, amongst other things, short stories, surrealist and absurdist humour, and Private Eye-style news satire.

The code for YS2 had been taken (supposedly without permission) from adventure game company Delta 4's similar Sceptical program. The writers often jokingly referred to a possible lawsuit against them, and wrote as an acknowledgement "The Sceptical driver is copyright Delta 4, who are really nice and hardly ever sue".

In 1999, a webzine, YS3, was launched by comp.sys.sinclair newsgroup regulars Nathan Cross and Jon Hyde, and managed to recreate something of the original magazine's style and humour. It ran irregularly until 2002. It has since returned in blog form.

== See also ==
- CRASH
- Sinclair User
