= Julian Gollop =

British video game designer (born 1965)

- Born: 1965 (age 60–61)
- Occupations: Video game designer Producer
- Years active: 1982–present
- Employer(s): Snapshot Games (founder and CEO)
- Known for: X-COM
- Notable work: Chaos: The Battle of Wizards; Rebelstar series Laser Squad; UFO: Enemy Unknown
- Spouse: Reni (m. 2003)
- Website: http://snapshotgames.com

Julian Gollop is a British video game designer and producer specialising in strategy games. He founded Mythos Games where he created the X-COM franchise beginning with UFO: Enemy Unknown in 1994. He later founded Codo Technologies in 2001 and Snapshot Games in 2013.

Gollop designed and programed games in the 1980s on the ZX Spectrum, beginning with Time Lords in 1983. He also created the Rebelstar series.

== Early life ==
Julian Gollop was born in 1965. He came of age in Harlow, England. When he was a child, his father introduced him to many different types of games, including chess, card games, and board games. His family played games regularly, choosing to play games instead of going to see films. When he was about 14 years old, Gollop started playing more complex games like Dungeons & Dragons, SPI board games, and Avalon Hill board games. After home computers became a reality while he was in secondary school, Gollop's fascination for complex strategy games helped him recognise how computers could allow him to make and play games he enjoyed.

== Game development ==
=== Early career (1982 to 1988) ===
In 1982, while he was still in secondary school, Gollop started designing and programming computer games. For £25, Gollop bought his first computer, a ZX81, from a school friend to learn programming. Even though the ZX81 only had one kilobyte of memory and no real graphics processing ability, he was "amazed" at its capabilities. His first published games were Islandia and Time Lords, which he made for the BBC Micro in 1983 with programmer Andy Greene, a school friend. Gollop subsequently upgraded to a ZX Spectrum and began creating video games like Nebula in BASIC. He recognised that his future involved computers.

When Gollop went on to the London School of Economics to study sociology, he spent more time creating video games such as Chaos: The Battle of Wizards and Rebelstar than he spent studying. He created the first Rebelstar by himself as a two-player game and brought it to a publisher that had an office near his college. They wanted it to be a single-player game, something he had not made before, so Gollop created functional path-finding algorithms from scratch, the game got published, and it ended up doing well.

=== Mythos Games (1988 to 2001) ===
In 1988, he was joined by his brother, Nick Gollop, in founding Target Games, a video game development company that subsequently changed to Mythos Games. Under the Mythos name, the Gollop brothers designed and developed computer games such as Laser Squad, UFO: Enemy Unknown and X-COM: Apocalypse. Up to this time, Gollop had only made computer games for 8-bit and 16-bit home computers commonly found in Europe. It was with UFO: Enemy Unknown (released in North America under the name X-Com: UFO Defense) that he first began making video games directly for the MS-DOS and later Microsoft Windows operating system personal computers that at the time would be sold primarily in the United States. Despite the success of these and other games, Mythos Games was forced to close in 2001 after an essential publisher was acquired by a company that withdrew commitments for The Dreamland Chronicles: Freedom Ridge, which Mythos Games was in the process of developing.

=== Codo Technologies (2001 to 2006) ===
After closing Mythos Games, Gollops founded Codo Technologies. They were disheartened by how mainstream publishers treated them at Mythos Games, so they tried a different business model. The inaugural game of Codo Technologies in 2002 was Laser Squad Nemesis, a turn-based tactics game with asynchronous, multiplayer play-by-email features which required a monthly subscription. The Gollop brothers developed only one other game, Rebelstar: Tactical Command, before he moved to Bulgaria with his wife in 2006.

=== Ubisoft Sofia (2006 to 2012) ===
After moving to Bulgaria, Gollop began working for Ubisoft in Sofia as a game designer. He was promoted quickly to producer, eventually leading the development of Tom Clancy's Ghost Recon: Shadow Wars for the Nintendo 3DS. He then became the co-creative director of Assassin's Creed III: Liberation for the PlayStation Vita. Gollop left Ubisoft in 2012 with ideas to remake games from earlier in his career.

=== Snapshot Games (since 2013) ===
As of 2017, Gollop works in Sofia as the CEO and chief designer for Snapshot Games, an independent video game developer he co-founded in 2013 with David Kaye. Chaos Reborn, the studio's first game, was released by Snapshot Games in 2015. He then led his company's development of Phoenix Point, which was released in December 2019.

== Personal life ==
Gollop moved to Sofia, Bulgaria in 2005. His wife Raina, who he married in 2003, is Bulgarian, and his two children were born circa 2011.

== Accolades ==
IGN included him among the top hundred computer game creators of all time. In the X-COM reboot, XCOM: Enemy Unknown, Firaxis Games gives homage to Gollop in the form of a "Gollop Chamber" facility in the game. Jake Solomon, creative lead for this XCOM and its sequel, XCOM 2, credits Gollop for much of his success.

== Games ==
Title	Year	Developer	Publisher
Time Lords	1983	Julian Gollop	Red Shift
Islandia	1983	Julian Gollop	Red Shift
Battlecars	1984	SLUG; Julian Gollop	Games Workshop
Nebula	1984	Julian Gollop	Red Shift
Rebelstar Raiders	1984	Julian Gollop	Red Shift
Chaos: The Battle of Wizards	1985	Julian Gollop	Games Workshop
Rebelstar	1986	Julian Gollop	Firebird
Laser Squad	1988	Mythos Games	Blade Software; MicroLeague
Rebelstar II	1989	Julian Gollop	Silverbird Software
Lords of Chaos	1990	Mythos Games	Blade Software
UFO: Enemy Unknown	1994	Mythos Games	MicroProse; Spectrum HoloByte (Japan)
X-COM: Apocalypse	1997	Mythos Games	MicroProse
Magic and Mayhem	1998	Mythos Games	EU: Virgin Interactive Entertainment; (Windows): NA: Bethesda (Windows)
The Dreamland Chronicles: Freedom Ridge	Cancelled	Mythos Games	—N/a
Laser Squad Nemesis	2002	Codo Technologies	EU: Merscom; NA: Got Game
Rebelstar: Tactical Command	2005	Codo Technologies	Namco
Rebelstar 2: The Meklon Conspiracy	Cancelled	Codo Technologies	—N/a
Chessmaster Live	2008	Ubisoft Sofia	Ubisoft; Feral Interactive (Mac OS X)
Ghost Recon: Shadow Wars	2011	Ubisoft Sofia	Ubisoft
Assassin's Creed III: Liberation	2012	Ubisoft Sofia	Ubisoft (PlayStation Vita)
Chaos Reborn	2015	Snapshot Games	Snapshot Games
Phoenix Point	2019	Snapshot Games	Snapshot Games
Chip ‘n Clawz vs. The Brainioids	2025	Snapshot Games	Arc Games
