= Laser Squad Nemesis =

2002 video game

- Developer(s): Codo Technologies
- Publisher(s): Digital: WW: Codo Technologies; Retail: EU: Just Play; AU: Just Play; NA: Got Game, Merscom
- Designer(s): Julian Gollop
- Composer(s): Nathan McCree
- Platform(s): Microsoft Windows
- Release: Digital: WW: February 1, 2002; Retail: EU: September 5, 2003; AU: March 15, 2004; NA: April 26, 2005
- Genre(s): Turn-based tactics
- Mode(s): Single-player, multiplayer

Laser Squad Nemesis is a 2002 multiplayer turn-based tactics video game developed by Codo Technologies for the PC. Its lead designer, Julian Gollop, previously designed the X-COM series and the original Laser Squad.

== Gameplay ==
Gameplay of Spawn vs Machina

Laser Squad Nemesis is a game of turn-based isometric combat, where players issue orders to a squad of soldiers or aliens. Each turn, the player gives orders to their troops, previews probable effects of those orders, and submits them to the LSN server via the web interface or through email. Orders are resolved simultaneously after both players have submitted their orders, and the consequences of the round are sent back to both players. The result of the previous turn is viewed in a real time ten-second video, with pause, slow motion and rewind (multiple turns) options.

There are four species that can be played in the game: the Marines, the Machina, the Spawn and the Greys. Marines are armoured foot soldiers that rely on their mobility and firepower to stay alive. Machina are slower, durable mechanical units with strong firepower. Spawn are an alien race that rely on numbers. They are mostly melee units and must get close to the opponent to engage them, though they do possess some ranged units. Greys are the stereotypical alien race with expensive weapons, mind-control technology and energy shields to protect their fragile bodies. Each race is distinct from the others and requires different tactics to be used efficiently.

== Reception ==
Laser Squad Nemesis garnered mixed reviews, and holds an average of 71% on aggregate web site GameRankings.

Laser Squad Nemesis won The Electric Playground's 2002 "Best Independent PC Game" award.

A number of enthusiasts run their own tournaments, where participants can play as part of a team or individually. There is also an automated tournament system that enables the game server to start games between players as necessary. Some of the more enterprising players have set up their own competitions using this system, and it is also used for the official Codo tournaments.

According to the official purchasing web page, the purchaser owns the Single player campaigns outright, and can also play unlimited Hotseat games with another person, but must maintain a paid subscription in order to play online multiplayer games. The entry-level version, which costs US$17, comes with one month of free online multiplayer play. Updates and patches were free for two years from date of purchase, though there have not been any since June 2006.
