= Laser Squad =

1988 video game

- Original cover art
- Developer: Target Games
- Publisher: Blade Software: Krisalis (Amiga, MS-DOS, EU) MicroIllusions (Amiga, NA) MicroLeague (MS-DOS, NA)
- Designer: Julian Gollop
- Programmer: Julian Gollop
- Platform: ZX Spectrum: Amiga, Amstrad CPC, Atari ST, Commodore 64, MS-DOS, MSX
- Release: 1988: ZX Spectrum; EU: 1988 Commodore 64; EU: 1988 Amstrad CPC; EU: 1989 Amiga; EU: 1989; NA: 1989 Atari ST; EU: 1989 MS-DOS; EU: 1992; NA: 1992
- Genre: Turn-based tactics
- Modes: Single-player, multiplayer

Laser Squad is a turn-based tactics video game, originally released for the ZX Spectrum in 1988 and converted over to the Commodore 64, Amstrad CPC, Amiga, Atari ST, MSX, and MS-DOS. It was developed by Julian Gollop and his team at Target Games (later Mythos Games) and published by Blade Software, expanding on the ideas applied in their earlier Rebelstar series. The initial 8-bit releases came with three mission scenarios, with expansion packs being released, containing further scenarios.

Reaction from gaming magazines was positive, gaining high review ratings and several accolades. The legacy of the game can be seen with the X-COM series, especially the acclaimed UFO: Enemy Unknown, which was initially conceived by Julian Gollop as a sequel to Laser Squad.

== Gameplay ==
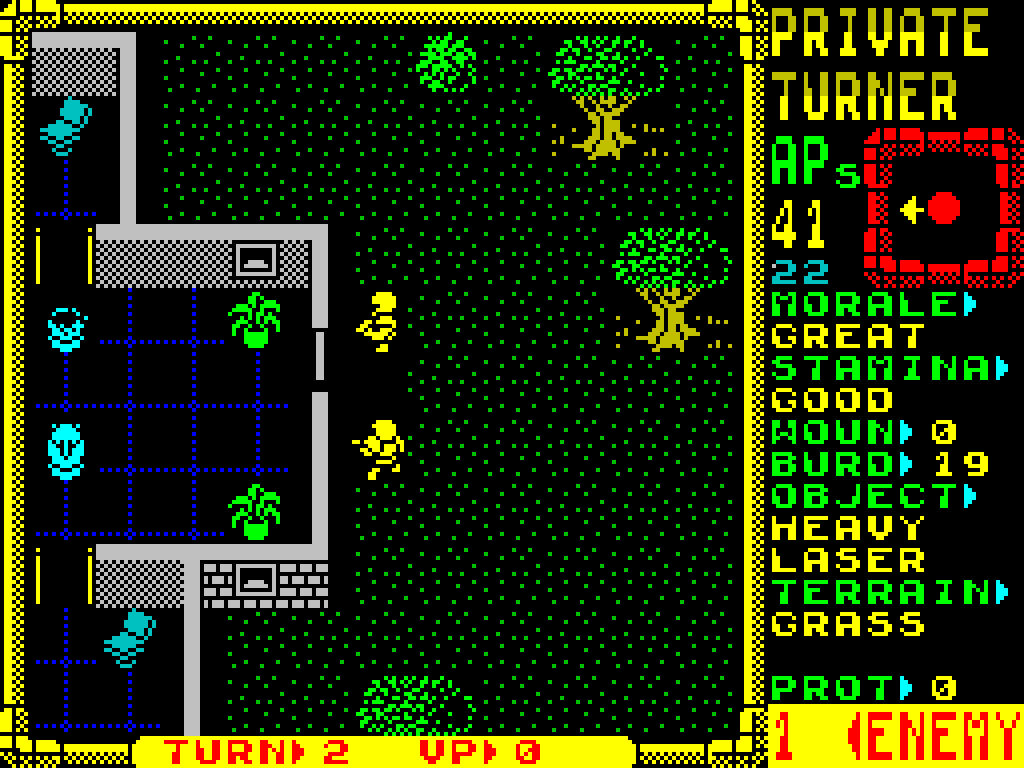
ZX Spectrum screenshot

Laser Squad is a one or two player turn-based tactics war game where the player is tasked with mission objectives such as assassination, infiltrate and destroy, and hostage rescue operations. Some mission objectives are achieved by eliminating enemy troops by taking advantage of cover, using squad level military tactics, and careful use of weaponry.

Before each mission begins, the player is given a limited amount of credits to purchase weapons and armour for their squad. The player then chooses the starting position for their squad members by placing them on one of the designated deployment squares.

Each mission takes place in a scenario map which is divided into square grids, and each unit occupies one square. The squad's team members are maneuvered around the map one at a time, consuming action points by carrying out movements, shooting, and picking up objects. More heavily laden units may tire more easily, and may have to rest to avoid running out of action points more quickly in subsequent turns. Morale can also play a factor; a unit witnessing the deaths of his teammates may panic and become out of the player's control.

In one-player mode the computer squad members' movements around the map are hidden from the player. This is part of the game's line of sight functionality, which means that the player can only fire upon any enemy targets that are within the unit's field of vision.

When an enemy squad member is spotted, the player is alerted with the opportunity to fire on them. There are a number of options when choosing to fire on an enemy target. An aimed shot costs the most action points, but more likely to hit the target, whereas a snap shot or auto shot costs less but is less accurate.

Each mission is limited to a number of turns and victory is achieved by obtaining 100 victory points. Victory points are obtained by carrying out the core mission for each scenario such as destroying equipment or by eliminating enemy targets, or a variation of both.

Including the expansion packs, there are seven scenarios in total, each one with its own difficulty settings and squad allocation:

1. "The Assassins" - The mission's objective is to assassinate weapons manufacturer Sterner Regnix. The player will lead a small squad of troops on an infiltration mission, dealing with droid patrols.
2. "Moonbase Assault" - A small squad must penetrate the Omni Corporation moonbase, via the airlocks, and destroy their computer systems.
3. "Rescue from the Mines" - After a routine mission goes badly wrong, three members of a squad are held prisoner in the Metallix Corp mines. A squad of troops must negotiate the mine complex, free all three prisoners and escape.
4. "The Cyber Hordes" - A small squad must defend a station from the attack of an advancing droid squad invasion. The base holds seven stabilizer cores vital to the planet's stability and the droids have focused their efforts on these targets.
5. "Paradise Valley" - Following on from "The Cyber Hordes", the destruction of the stabilizer cores has left the colony in ruins and assault ships hover above waiting for the time of attack. To prevent capture of the blueprints for an advanced starfighter, the data has been transferred onto a portable security device and a squad is given the task of escaping from the colony with the device.
6. "The Stardrive" - A group of mercenaries have captured a stardrive controller. A squad must go to their hidden base and retrieve the device.
7. "Laser Platoon" - A free for all deathmatch as equal teams are pitted against each other. Large (10-man) squads, with reinforcements arriving frequently, hunt down the equally equipped opposition.

== Development ==
Following the completion of Rebelstar, Julian Gollop started work on Laser Squad as his next project. Along with his brother, Nick, he set up Target Games with the aim of developing and publishing their future games.

Taking the core elements of the Rebelstar series, Gollop introduced many improvements such as multiple scenarios, expansion kits, weapon configurations, improved AI, linked story lines, and line-of-sight rules. The line-of-sight and hidden movement features were something that Gollop was keen to integrate into Laser Squad because it was prevalent in board games, which many of Gollop's games had taken influence from. Julian felt that previous games were too easy, especially for experienced gamers, so difficulty levels were introduced.

While Julian was still programming the ZX Spectrum version, his brother Nick began converting the Commodore 64 version. With the ZX Spectrum version complete, Julian was then able to convert the Zilog Z80 code for the Amstrad CPC version. Providing extra support to the development were Mike Stockwell, who carried out the Spectrum tape/joystick routines and crunching, and Ian Terry, who assisted with the game's scenario design.

Teque Software (renamed Krisalis Software soon after) took on responsibility of developing the Amiga, Atari ST, and PC versions. The 16-bit development team included Frederic O’Rourke (programming), Jason Wilson (graphics), with Matt Furniss composing the music.

== Release ==
The original ZX Spectrum game was released in 1988, and was followed by the Commodore 64, MSX, Amstrad CPC, Amiga, Atari ST, and MS-DOS.

The original Target Games release on the 8-bit computers came with three scenarios, with an expansion pack being offered via mail order for an additional two scenarios. It became apparent that Target Games could not keep publishing their own games with the resources they had, so the publishing rights were sold to Blade Software.

The subsequent Blade Software releases included all five scenarios as standard, with the next mail order expansion pack offering scenarios six and seven to 8-bit computer owners. Both offers covered cassette tape and floppy disk versions. As well as featuring new scenarios, the expansion packs included additional weapons and items.

The 16-bit versions were published by Krisalis Software in Europe, with the Atari ST and Amiga conversions released in 1989 with the PC MS-DOS version appearing in 1992. The 16-bit versions came with the first five scenarios, although there were no expansion pack for scenarios six and seven. In North America, the Amiga version was published by MicroIllusions, while the PC version was published by MicroLeague Multimedia. Several unofficial releases have been produced, including the PC-98 and Plus/4/Commodore 16.

== Reception ==
Reception

Review scores
Publication	Score
Sinclair User	89/100
Your Sinclair	9/10
Crash	89%
ACE	873/1000
Computer & Video Games	97%
The Games Machine	(ZXS) 84% (Amiga) 93%
CU Amiga-64	(C64) 92% (Amiga) 87%
Zzap!64	(C64) 83%
Amstrad Action	(CPC) 91%
Amiga Format	(Amiga) 93%
Amiga User International	(Amiga) 8/10
Zero	(Amiga) 88%
Amiga Action	(Amiga) 66%
Amiga Computing	(Amiga) 84%

Awards
Publication	Award
Amstrad Action	Mastergame
C+VG	Hit!
CU	Screen Star
Amiga Format	Gold
Your Sinclair	Megagame

The original ZX Spectrum release was widely praised for its innovative approach in bringing tactical wargaming to the 8-bit computers, blending strategy with arcade-like action, which appeals to a broader audience, including those new to strategy games. Critics stated that the game creates suspense and tension, particularly through its close-quarters combat and the uncertainty of enemy movements.

While ACE felt that the control system "takes a little while to get used to", others praised it, with Sinclair User highlighting the menu system as logically organized and intuitive, contributing to smooth gameplay. The multiple difficulty levels provide a challenge that keeps players engaged with the two-player mode adding plenty of re-playability.

Special mention was given to the strategic gameplay, which shines with the hidden movement mechanic and line-of-sight rules, demanding careful planning and tactical decision-making. Even though some critics felt that the combat can feel disadvantageous for the attacker in some cases, its depth and complexity make it satisfying, with Your Sinclair calling it "a sophisticated strategy wargame...on a par with Elite for thinking warmongers."

Despite receiving a few minor critiques from Crash for a "lack of background detail" and no direct connection between scenarios, Laser Squad was lauded for its innovation and polish. Computer and Video Games awarded it a near-perfect 97% score and a 'C+VG HIT!', stating that it was "one of the hottest games" they had ever played. Its implementation of strategy and arcade elements, along with an AI-driven challenge earned it a reputation as one of the finest 8-bit strategy games, with a lasting impact on the genre.

Later conversions also fared well. The Commodore 64 was praised by CU Amiga-64 who stated that it was "one of the best games ever to appear". Zzap!64 wrote that the game was "an absorbing and very fresh approach to man-to-man combat." Amstrad Action praised the CPC version, rounding off their review by stating that "you'll love the smell of Auto Cannon in the morning. It smells of Victory.” The Amiga version also received positive reviews, with Amiga Format explaining that it "is a terrific game that is superbly playable and can definitely be recommended."

== Legacy ==
Following on from Laser Squad, Mythos Games released a fantasy game Lords of Chaos, which shared similarities to Laser Squad. Laser Squad has been described as one of Julian Gollop's most influential games and one of the best 8-bit strategy games, and was instrumental to the development of the subsequent X-Com games. In fact, a demo of Laser Squad 2 was used as the starting point in developing UFO: Enemy Unknown for publisher MicroProse.

The Laser Squad franchise was revived by Gollop's Codo Technologies in 2002 with the play-by-email game Laser Squad Nemesis, although this departs from the turn-based action point system and does not have customizable weaponry.

Laser Squad has featured in many publication's top games of all time. The game was voted number 16 in Your Sinclair's Readers' Top 100 Games of All Time. In 1993, Commodore Force ranked the game at number two on its list of the top 100 Commodore 64 games. In 2004, readers of Retro Gamer voted Laser Squad as the 63rd top classic game. It was ranked the 77th best Amiga game ever by Amiga Power.

The retrogaming community has since kept the Laser Squad games alive with various fan-made scenarios, level editors and remakes.
