= Magic & Mayhem: The Art of Magic =

2001 video game

- Developers: Charybdis Limited; Climax Studios
- Publishers: EU/AU: Virgin Interactive; NA: Bethesda Softworks
- Producer: Andy Smith
- Designer: Mark Hardisty
- Programmer: Hal Angseesing
- Artist: Mark Hardisty
- Writers: Piers Blofeld; Nick Reed
- Composer: Jim Croft
- Platform: Windows
- Release: NA: October 23, 2001; UK: November 2, 2001; AU: November 14, 2001
- Genres: Real-time strategy, role-playing
- Modes: Single-player, multiplayer

Magic & Mayhem: The Art of Magic is a 2001 video game developed by Charybdis Limited and Climax Studios. It is a sequel to 1998's Magic and Mayhem.

== Gameplay ==
Magic & Mayhem: The Art of Magic is a fantasy-themed game that blends real-time strategy, role-playing, and tactical gameplay. The player controls Aurax, the main character, who can summon creatures and cast spells. The player also has partial control over party members who can assist with various abilities. Summoning creatures and casting spells drain the mana pool. The player can regain mana by collecting mana sprites or controlling "places of power." After each scenario, experience points are earned to increase maximum mana, health, or the number of creatures Aurax can control. Missions range from killing enemy wizards to unique tasks like morphing into a troll to steal an artifact. The difficulty level of missions varies and does not follow a clear progression. Multiplayer mode features a deathmatch format where control of places of power and collecting power-ups are crucial.

== Development ==
The game was announced on May 8, 2000. The game was being developed by Nottingham-based developer Charybdis until the studio closed on April 30, 2001, leading to Climax Studios finishing development upon absorbing the majority of Charybdis' employees. It went gold on October 10, 2001, and was released in North America on October 23, in the United Kingdom on November 2, and in Australia on November 14.

== Reception ==
Reception

Review scores
Publication	Score
Computer Gaming World	4/5
Dayton Daily News	B
Eurogamer	5/10
GameSpot	6.5/10
GameSpy	79/100
IGN	7.8/10

The game holds a score of 71% on Metacritic based on 14 reviews.

Computer Gaming World gave the game a score of 4 of 5, saying that the game conjures up an "engaging" mix of tactical combat and RPG game play with "good" replay value due to skirmish and multiplayer options.
