= All or Nothing (video game) =

1984 video game

- Developer: Paul Reynolds
- Publisher: Abbex
- Platform: ZX Spectrum
- Release: EU: 1984
- Genre: Action-adventure
- Mode: Single-player

All or Nothing is an action-adventure game written by Paul Reynolds for the ZX Spectrum and released in 1984 by Abbex. The mission in All or Nothing is to retrieve secret files from an enemy camp and escape, all within a time limit. The game has an oblique display that utilises four cameras. If the character is obscured by an object, the camera will change automatically to keep the character in view.

== Gameplay ==
Screenshot

The player parachutes into the camp and must initially find his watch that has been lost in the parachute jump in order to keep track of the remaining time, after which a transmitter may be used to request more time if necessary. While searching for the hidden documents, the player must gain access into a series of warehouses, some of which house keys that then allow access to other locations. This is done by cracking a safe code in the warehouse office; cracking the safe will reward the player with a key, which can then be used to gain access to the next warehouse. As well as housing the hidden documents the player is searching for, these buildings contain supplies such as money, ammunition and explosives.

Enemies in All or Nothing come in the form of patrol dogs and armed guards. The latter can be bribed with money found while exploring to temporarily allow the player greater freedom, and also be distracted with explosions. Gas canisters can also be used to incapacitate guards, whereupon their bodies may be searched; as with bribing, ID cards found on the disabled guards allow a limited period of immunity.

== Reception ==
At the time of release, All or Nothing received positive reviews, although attracted some criticism due to its brevity (only 10 buildings), poor long term appeal, and claims that the use of isometric graphics was no longer impressive. However, eight years after its release, ZX Spectrum games magazine Your Sinclair voted All or Nothing the third best game ever released for the system.
