= Chaos: The Battle of Wizards =

1985 video game

- Cover art by Julek Heller
- Publisher: Games Workshop
- Designer: Julian Gollop
- Platform: ZX Spectrum
- Release: EU: 1985
- Genre: Turn-based tactics
- Modes: Single-player, multiplayer

Chaos: The Battle of Wizards is a turn-based tactics video game released for the ZX Spectrum in 1985. It was written by Julian Gollop and originally published by Games Workshop. Based on Gollop's 1982 design for a board game / card game hybrid, Chaos received a positive reception and went on to influence various games, including Darwinia, and spawned a sequel, Lords of Chaos, in 1990.

== Gameplay ==
In Chaos, players embody wizards who strive to outsmart and outlast each other. The goal is to be the last wizard standing, achieved by eliminating all opponents. The game can include two to eight wizards, and these can be either human players or computer-controlled entities. The skill level for computer-controlled wizards can range from 1 to 8, affecting combat statistics but not their AI. Notably, these AI wizards do not cooperate with each other; their sole objective is to eliminate both human and computer-controlled adversaries.

=== Spells and magic ===
Each wizard starts with a random array of spells for battle. Spells can be categorized as Lawful, Neutral, or Chaotic, with their success rate during casting represented as a percentage. Spells can only be cast once, except for the "Disbelieve" spell that remains at a wizard's disposal throughout. New spells can be obtained solely through the "Magic Wood" spell.

The nature of spells cast during the game can affect the success rate of subsequent spells. Casting multiple lawful spells cultivates a lawful environment, consequently making other lawful spells easier to cast. The same principle applies to chaotic spells. Casting spells of opposing alignment doesn't make them more challenging. Neutral spells remain unaffected by the environment, and their difficulty remains constant. This dynamic plays a significant role in the game's strategy, prompting players to cast multiple easy spells of a certain alignment to make casting more potent spells of the same alignment easier.

=== Wizard and creature characteristics ===
Wizards have attributes such as attack and defense ratings, move ratings, maneuver ratings, and magic resistance, governing their effectiveness, movement capability, combat exit ease, and defense against magic, respectively. They also have a magic rating determining the number of initial spells.

Creature spells can summon a creature next to the wizard. These creatures vary in difficulty to summon and power, with the most formidable ones being hardest to summon. Like wizards, creatures also have attack, defense, move, and maneuver ratings, along with magic resistance.

=== Turn-based gameplay ===
In each turn, human wizards can examine the board and their spells, and choose a spell to cast in the next turn. To prevent unfair advantage, other human players typically look away during a player's spell choice. After all players have chosen their spells, they try to cast them in sequence. Computer-controlled wizards select their spells during each turn's play stage, often leading to actions seemingly requiring foreknowledge of other players' actions.

After casting spells, surviving wizards take turns to move their characters and any creatures they control, unless they are engaged in combat. They can attack other wizards or creatures by moving or flying into them, which also engages the enemy for immediate combat. Successful attacks eliminate the enemy, and the victorious entity moves onto its square. The success of an attack depends on the attacker's combat rating, defender's defense rating, and a degree of randomness. Some creatures can execute ranged attacks if they have a clear line of sight.

All computer-controlled entities always attempt to move each turn, even when it might not be beneficial, unless they are in a Magic Wood, Castle, or Citadel. All creatures or spells created by a wizard vanish immediately if that wizard is destroyed. For human players, none of the actions are compulsory; they can skip any actions they wish to. The turn sequence restarts after all wizards have taken their turn to move and fight.

== Development ==
Chaos was created entirely by Julian Gollop, based on his 1982 design for a traditional card game, itself inspired by the early Games Workshop board game Warlock. He was an avid card game designer and saw computers as a way of hiding game rules too complicated for pen-and-paper scenarios. Thus the board used in the card game became the tiled map in the video game.

== Reception ==
CRASH awarded Chaos 8 out of 10, praising the neatness of the presentation, efficient sound effects, pleasing sprites and concluding that it was a very good multiplayer strategy game. Criticisms included the sparseness of the initial playing area, lack of status report for the wizards and information on how much damage was being dealt. The reviewer also felt there could have been a wider range of missile attack spells. Sinclair User rated Chaos 4 out of 5 stars, calling it "fast-moving and colourful" with simple, functional graphics. It was seen to be complex enough to appeal to players of both Dungeons & Dragons and strategy games. White Dwarf awarded it 7 out of 10, finding particular fun in the spells "Magic Fire" and "Gooey Blob" but criticized the poor quality of the instruction booklet.

== Legacy ==
In the final issue of Your Sinclair in 1993, Chaos was listed at fifth place of the Your Sinclair Readers' Top 100 Games Of All Time.

One of Jagex's early games was Cyber Wars, a browser-based online multiplayer clone of Chaos that switched the fantasy theme of the game for a sci-fi one; it was part of the Castle Games Domain online lobby. Developers of the indie PC strategy game Darwinia cite Chaos as an influence during its early development. Chaos has also been the subject of many homebrew remakes such as Chaos Funk: Gollop regularly receives requests from people wishing to create remakes.

Gollop developed the game Chaos Reborn, described as "part sequel, part re-imagining of [the] original game" and was released in October 2015.
