= Xatax =

1994 video game

- Developer(s): Pixel Painters
- Publisher(s): Pixel Painters
- Platform(s): MS-DOS
- Release: 1994
- Genre(s): Scrolling shooter
- Mode(s): Single-player

Xatax is a horizontally scrolling shooter developed by Pixel Painters for MS-DOS compatible operating systems and released as shareware in 1994.

== Plot ==
It is the 25th century and after centuries of peace a disarmed humanity is under attack by an alien force known as the "Xatax", which destroys planets by consuming all life on them and leaving only barren wasteland. The Xatax grows stronger with each world it destroys by assimilating the living creatures it consumes into itself.

An ancient starfighter has been taken from the Interguild Museum located on Terra and restored to combat condition. It must now destroy the Xatax.

== Gameplay ==
The game is a horizontally scrolling shooter. The player's ship must defeat waves of attacking aliens and defensive turrets over three levels before challenging the Xatax itself. Dead aliens drop power-up capsules which must be collected if the player is to survive to the end of the mission.
