= X-COM: Apocalypse =

1997 video game

- European cover art
- Developer: Mythos Games
- Publisher: MicroProse
- Designer: Julian Gollop
- Programmer: Nick Gollop
- Artists: Guy Jeffries; Marc Curtis
- Composers: John Broomhall; Richard Wells
- Series: X-COM
- Platform: DOS
- Release: NA: July 15, 1997; EU: 1997
- Genre: Turn-based/real-time tactics
- Mode: Single-player

X-COM: Apocalypse is a 1997 science fiction tactical strategy video game developed by Mythos Games and published by MicroProse for DOS. It is the third installment in the X-COM series, following Terror from the Deep. Set 50 years after the second campaign, the game takes place primarily within the futuristic megalopolis of Mega-Primus.

Unlike its predecessors, Apocalypse introduced real-time tactical combat alongside the traditional turn-based mode, with a detailed management layer centered on navigating relations, commerce, and conflicts with the city's various independent corporate and political organizations.

The title's development was famously troubled, marked by friction between Mythos Games and publisher MicroProse over artistic direction and design scope, which series creator Julian Gollop described as a disaster. Despite these production hurdles and a complex development cycle, Apocalypse received generally favorable reviews from critics upon release, who praised its gameplay depth, atmosphere, and innovative integration of urban strategy mechanics, though it achieved less commercial success than the original game.

== Gameplay ==
Similar to the first two X-COM games, Apocalypse features a map-like management mode (the Cityscape) and an isometric combat mode (the Battlescape). The management mode takes place in a single city, called Mega Primus, rather than being spread out over the entire planet Earth as in the previous games. In addition, Apocalypse was the first game in the X-COM series to include a real-time combat option as well as the traditional turn-based mode.

Apocalypse features a new interface with new graphics compared to the earlier two X-COM games. It is more complex, and the task of keeping and increasing the funding of the X-COM organization now extends to not only intercepting UFOs, but also to minimizing collateral damage, preventing alien hostile takeovers and even raiding the buildings of other organisations, of which there are many in Mega Primus.

X-COM: Apocalypse claims to have a self-learning AI-module. The game uses a self-adjusting difficulty where player performance influences the Alien's technological advancement of hand-held weaponry in future battlescape combat. A highly positive weekly performance will accelerate the advancement whereas sub-standard X-COM performance in battlescape combat will stifle alien technology and can even reverse it from gains made in the past. This gives the player the chance to amend their failures and rethink their strategy. Aerial UFO combat within Mega Primus determines the technology aboard UFO craft in the future. As with battlescape combat, a consistently high positive rating by destroying all UFOs that appear in the city will lead to better equipment aboard future UFOs. Essentially, the player can control the fine tuning of the available five difficulties by playing well which leads to a harder game in the near future, or easier, if willfully playing badly.

=== Mega-Primus ===
The city is run by 13 elected senators. Large corporations maintain the environmental, social and economic structure of the city, while the populace live in relative comfort. Mega-Primus has its own marginalized minorities, consisting of Sectoid-human hybrids and androids, both by-products of the previous wars. These minorities have set up their own political pressure groups. When the aliens invade, the city government reestablishes X-COM. This time there is no absolute support by world/city governments. Mega-Primus has its own governing body who supply nearly all of X-COM's income. X-COM would have to support its income through the sale of alien artifacts captured from missions, and items manufactured in their own workshops.

X-COM must maintain a good rapport with other organizations in the city. If X-COM angers any of them, or fails to contain the alien incursion, organizations will demand compensation or even actively attack X-COM forces. They will also withdraw their support (if any) for the X-COM project. For example, the Transtellar organization would prevent Agents and science personnel from travelling around the city. The corporations and political organizations will make profits, manufacture items for sale, and even fight covert battles with one another independently of the player. One of these organizations, the Cult of Sirius, is a group of religious fanatics who worship the aliens, and is inherently hostile to X-COM. The aliens, rather than simply signing non-aggression treaties with the various corporations, will attempt to infest their corporation and take control of the organizations themselves leading to a possible infestation across most of Mega Primus.

If the Government becomes hostile towards X-COM for any reason, such as alien interference or excessive damage to Government property, the X-COM project will receive no further funding. This is a potential disaster for the player and can lead to X-COM's financial stress. Possible solutions are purposely raiding a company to steal items to use or sell. Raids are an optional battlescape mission within X-COM Apocalypse which can be started as desired. With strong military performance and efficient management, X-COM can overpower Mega Primus and also the UFO threat leading to military dominance of the city but also the Alien's homeworld.

== Plot ==
Half a century after the end of the second X-COM campaign, the last battle of T'leth has severely damaged Earth's biosphere. As a result, several self-contained Megalopolis-type cities were proposed to provide habitation for humanity. The game follows Mega-Primus, the first of these cities, built over the ruins of Toronto, Canada. Meanwhile, the off-world colony of Mars is exploited by the Elerium mining corporation, Solmine, and oppressed by MarSec (MARs SECurity).

The alien threat in the game is presented by a new race of organic, extradimensional aliens that initially seem to have no relation to the aliens of the previous two games, though later missions set in the aliens' home dimension reveal they have enslaved Sectoid survivors. These new aliens attack the city through tetrahedron-shaped teleport gates. The player must find out how to send their own aircraft, along with X-COM agents, through these gates without being destroyed and take the war to the aliens. Apocalypse has 14 races of alien beings including Anthropods, Brainsuckers, Hyperworms, Megaspawns, and Micronoids. Each race has various strengths and weaknesses, and some races are dependent on other races. The "alien life cycle" plays a crucial role in the game.

The player is exposed to this "alien life cycle" through research and more importantly the lower level alien attacks during specimen gathering combat. Primarily the attack of the weaponized alien the Brain-Sucker which attacks individuals after landing from a pod launcher used by alien foot soldiers. The Brain-Sucker hatches and attacks the nearest individual by jumping on their head and seemingly injecting something into them through the mouth and dying immediately after the attempt.

The life cycle later takes a mysterious turn as it shows no connection between the lower alien forms and higher alien forms. Eventually, however, it is found that the leaders of the invasion are the Micronoids, a race of sapient, single-celled organisms that live in the bloodstreams of the other aliens. The ultimate goal of the invasion is to inject Micronoids into the bloodstreams of important figures, allowing them to control Mega-Primus through psionic domination of their hosts. The player is eventually tasked with invading the aliens' homeworld and destroying their side of the gate to stop the Micronoid infestation.

== Development ==
During the creation of Apocalypse, Mythos Games created the game but MicroProse wanted to create the graphics. Julian Gollop called the relationship "disastrous", and said of the game "It was a disaster area. Apocalypse was quite a sophisticated and ambitious game, but it was a big mistake from our point of view. In retrospect, we should have originally agreed to do a sequel in six months, and spent a year doing it, like they did! It would've been a lot better." Gollop recollected, "After completing this game I know how Francis Coppola felt after filming Apocalypse Now. Just about everything that could go wrong did go wrong, and the amount of effort required to pull it into shape was immense. After three years of hard work and five different producers X-Com: Apocalypse finally hit the streets. The initial game design was definitely too ambitious and too complex."

Artist Terry Greer recalled: "My main memory of Apocalypse was the pain we all went through. It was a hugely ambitious project and used a mix of rendered and hand drawn artwork from a variety of graphic styles (which didn't always work – although all the individual bits were great). Probably the worst fit was Tim White (an established SF artist) who had been commissioned to do the character designs. I like Tim's work, but his models were intensely detailed and quite unsuitable for reducing to the scale needed for an isometric game of this type. The creatures he designed looked great full screen, but reduced to the size they would be ingame they were often unrecognizable blobs. I don't know the reasons behind the decision to hire him, only that the problems were apparent to everyone in the art department, and I would have loved to have seen them ditched."

== Release ==
X-COM: Apocalypse was originally released in the U.S. on July 15, 1997. It was re-released as part of the compilations X-COM Collection by Hasbro Interactive in 1999, and X-COM: Complete Pack in 2008 and 2K Huge Games Pack in 2009 by 2K Games. On September 5, 2008, the X-COM series, including X-COM Apocalypse, became available for sale on Valve's Steam platform; the game runs in a specially configured version of DOSBox.

== Reception ==
Reception

Review scores
| Publication | Score |
|---|---|
| CNET Gamecenter | 8/10 |
| Computer Games Strategy Plus | 4/5 |
| Computer Gaming World | 4/5 |
| Edge | 9/10 |
| Game Informer | 9.5/10 |
| GameSpot | 8.6/10 |
| Next Generation | 3/5 |
| PC Gamer (US) | 86% |
| PC PowerPlay | 93% |
| PCMag | 4/5 |
| Science Fiction Weekly | B+ |

=== Reviews ===
The game received favorable reviews. Next Generation said, "In the end, Apocalypse is a step in the right direction, but a step with a wobble. With better control over the cityscape, and more distinct atmosphere and character, it would have been a smash. As it is, it's enjoyable, and well-worth the investment in money and time, but not what it could have been."

Despite the troubled development, Apocalypse was well received. GameSpot included it on their 2000 list of the most disappointing endings, criticizing the game for its "colorful, almost humorous tone," but added that otherwise the designers "did a great job."

=== Sales ===
The game debuted at No. 6 on PC Data's computer game sales chart for the month of July 1997. It secured 18th place the following month. By July 23, the game had shipped 120,000 units to retailers globally. Market research firm SofTrends estimated sell-through of 32,812 units during July alone.

=== Awards ===
The game won the award for "Turn-based Strategy" at PC PowerPlay's 1997 Game of the Year Awards.

== Open-source remake ==
In 2014 a group of developers formed to remake the game from scratch in C++, under the OpenApoc title. By 2018 the remake had reached an Alpha release state with the entire game playable from start to end and a growing community of developers and players.
