= Lords of Chaos (video game) =

1990 video game

- Developer: Mythos Games
- Publisher: Blade Software
- Designers: Julian Gollop; Nick Gollop; Martin Beadle
- Composer: Matt Furniss
- Platforms: Amstrad CPC, Atari ST, Commodore 64, Amiga, ZX Spectrum
- Release: 8-bit: April 1990; 16-bit: August 1991
- Genres: Turn-based tactics, tactical role-playing game
- Modes: Single-player, multiplayer

Lords of Chaos is a turn-based tactics tactical role-playing game published by Blade Software in 1990. It is the sequel to Chaos: The Battle of Wizards and an ancestor of the popular X-COM series of games, also written by Julian Gollop. In Lords of Chaos each player controls a wizard who can cast various magic spells. The spells have various effects, for example summoning other creatures (which the player also controls), or damaging opposing creatures and wizards. The game can be played against a computer-controlled opponent or by up to four human players.

== Gameplay ==
Before embarking on the game's levels, the player is asked to design a wizard. This is done by splitting experience points amongst mana, action points, stamina, constitution, combat, defense and magic resistance. Remaining experience points are spent on spells. Spells may be offensive in nature (Magic Bolt, Curse), potions (Speed Potion, Healing Potion), utility (Teleport, Magic Eye) or summoning (Goblin, Unicorn, etc.). These spells continue the theme from Chaos: The Battle of Wizards and include some of that game's more unusual elements (Gooey Blob, for example). After completing each scenario, the player may spend accumulated experience points to further improve their wizard.

The aim of each level of the game is for a player's wizard to reach a portal which appears after a preset number of turns. To do this, the player's wizard and creatures move around a map composed of square tiles, each of which represents one of various terrain types (for example, forest or the wall of a building). During a player's turn, only the parts of the map which that player's wizard or creatures have previously seen are shown, thus leading to other human players having to look away from the screen during each turn to avoid learning information they "shouldn't" know. Points are awarded for a player's wizard reaching the portal, for holding items of treasure (for example, valuable gems) when the wizard reaches the portal, or for enemy creatures killed during the level. Each level ends when all wizards have reached the portal or been killed, or when the portal disappears after a fixed number of turns (in which case all the remaining wizards lose). During each turn, each creature has a fixed number of action points which it can use to accomplish actions, for example moving, fighting hand-to-hand or shooting ranged weapons. When a creature's action points are used up for the turn, it can take no further actions until all the players have had a turn.

The game came shipped with three scenarios: "The Many Coloured Land" provided both indoor and outdoor environments; "Slayer's Dungeon" was a traditional monster-inhabited dungeon containing a powerful sword; and "Ragaril's Domain" was single-player only, set in a trap-filled palace. An expansion pack was also available if purchased directly from Mythos Games which contained two further scenarios: "Islands of Iris" and "Tombs of the Undead", the latter being single-player only.

A demonstration scenario called "Escape From Zol" was released on the covers of Your Sinclair and Zero magazines. It was single-player only and similar in style to "Ragaril's Domain" where the player had to escape from a trap-filled building, but even if the player won, their wizard's experience could not be used in the other five scenarios.

== Release ==
Lords of Chaos was released on both 8-bit and 16-bit platforms. The 8-bit versions (for the ZX Spectrum, Commodore 64 and Amstrad CPC) were released in April 1990, with the 16-bit versions (Atari ST and Commodore Amiga) following in August 1991. The prices were £9.95 for the Spectrum/Commodore 64/Amstrad CPC tape, £19.95 for the Atari ST disk and £24.95 for the Commodore Amiga disk. An IBM PC version was scheduled for release but never emerged.

== Reception ==
The Spectrum version of Lords of Chaos was reviewed in 1990 by Your Sinclair, awarding 90%, and by CRASH, awarding 80%. Both reviews highlighted the game's detailed, colourful graphics and the complexity and depth of the strategic gameplay.

The game won the award for best adventure game of the year, as voted by the readers of Crash. It was also voted number 21 in the Your Sinclair Readers' Top 100 Games of All Time.
