= Mythos Games =

UK video game developer

- Industry: Video games
- Founded: 1988
- Founder: Julian Gollop; Nick Gollop
- Defunct: 2001
- Successor: Codo Technologies
- Headquarters: Harlow, England (UK)

Mythos Games was a British video game developer company founded by Julian Gollop and Nick Gollop in 1988 as Target Games. It is best known for its 1994 strategy game UFO: Enemy Unknown (released in North America as X-Com: UFO Defense), which went on to become the first instalment in the later XCOM series. Following the closing of Mythos Games in 2001, the brothers founded Codo Technologies.

== Games ==
| Year | Title | Publisher |
|---|---|---|
| 1988 | Rebelstar II | Silverbird Software |
| 1988 | Laser Squad | Blade Software; MicroLeague (MS-DOS) |
| 1990 | Lords of Chaos | Blade Software |
| 1994 | UFO: Enemy Unknown | MicroProse |
| 1997 | X-COM: Apocalypse | MicroProse |
| 1998 | Magic & Mayhem | EU: Virgin Interactive; NA: Bethesda Softworks |
| Cancelled | The Dreamland Chronicles: Freedom Ridge | —N/a |
