= Turn-based tactics =

Video game subgenre

Turn-based tactics (TBT) is a sub-genre of strategy video games. They are turn-based simulations of operational warfare and military tactics in generally small-scale confrontations as opposed to more strategic considerations of turn-based strategy (TBS) games. Turn-based tactical gameplay is characterized by the expectation of players to complete their tasks using only the combat forces provided to them in a generally realistic (or at least believable) manner.

== Genre characteristics ==
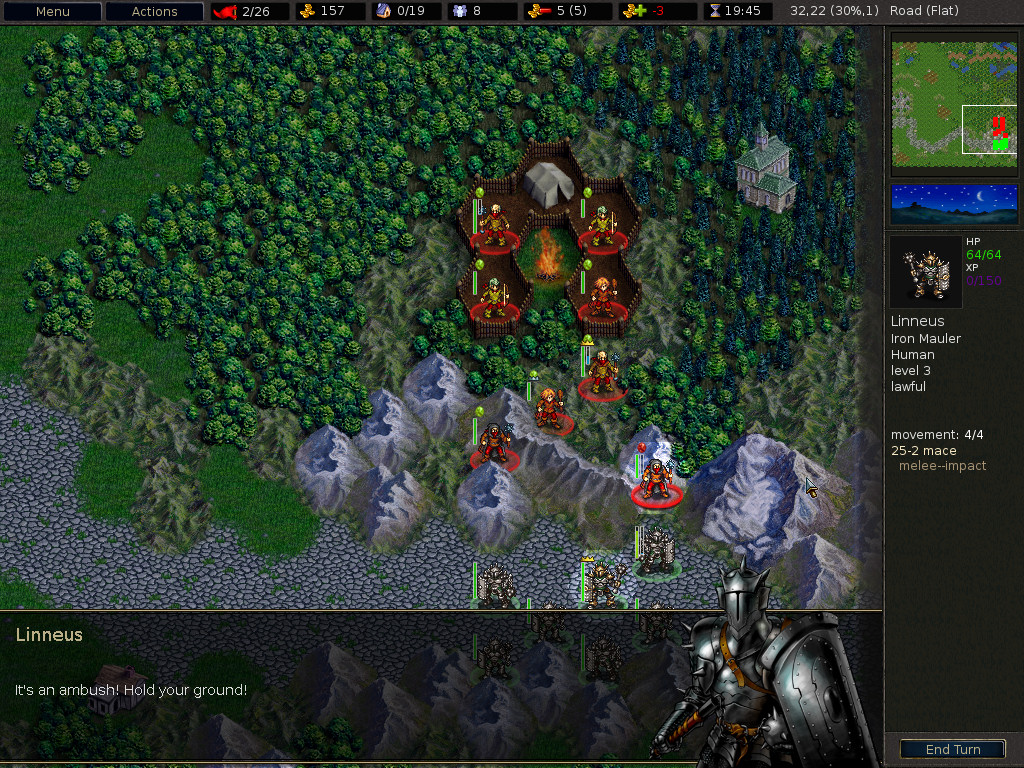
Individual units are commanded to perform military tactics such as an ambush. Screenshot is from The Battle for Wesnoth.

The gameplay of turn-based tactics game is the turn-based counterpart to that found in the real-time tactics genre. The genre has its roots in tactical and miniature wargaming, the recreation of battle scenarios using miniatures or simple paper chits. Compared to other strategy games, turn-based tactics games often have detailed and complex environments due to the tactical implications of elevation, hard cover and line of sight. Further, in most turn-based tactics games, a player's force is maintained between battles. This allows units to become more proficient as they gain more battle experience. Coupled with the often small and specialised squads used, this can encourage an affinity between players and their troops.

== History ==
During the 1980s, as microcomputers and personal computers became more powerful and more common, game developers turned their attention to designing tactical wargames for them. Some early tactical wargames for the computer included Gary Grigsby's series of games for the Commodore 64 and Apple II: Panzer Strike (1987), and Typhoon of Steel (1988), while the first time the system was properly built was with Famicom Wars, which was launched for the Family Computer in 1988.

Battle Isle is a series of games developed starting in 1991 by Blue Byte. Set on a fictional planet, Chromos, and inspired by the Japanese game Nectaris (1989), the games feature futuristic tactical battles played on a hexagonal grid. Players control combat units, ranging from infantry and tanks to helicopters, fighters and bombers, as well as (especially in the later games) support units, including ammo and fuel transports, scout and radar units, and road and trench construction vehicles. Battle Isle also spawned a man-to-man wargame, Incubation: Time Is Running Out (1997), an even earlier strategy title to use fully 3D graphics and support hardware acceleration on the 3dfx Voodoo.

Steel Panthers was released in 1995 by SSI, very much resembling a board wargame translated to the computer; it gave a traditional overhead view, though numeric ratings were not visible on the screen depictions. Two sequels followed; Steel Panthers II: Modern Battles in 1996 and Steel Panthers III: Brigade Command 1939-1999 in 1997. Rights to the game and source code were later acquired by Matrix Games who developed and released as freeware an improved remake based on the Steel Panthers III engine (but limited to the timespan of World War II); this was known as Steel Panthers: World at War! (SP:WAW). Another group, SP-Camo, developed and released Steel Panthers: World War II, and Steel Panthers: Main Battle Tank was released in June 2005. The SP-Camo games were based on the Steel Panthers II engine. Both the Matrix Games and SP-Camo versions had many fans and resulted in several releases with enhanced graphics, program code changes, and new unit types.

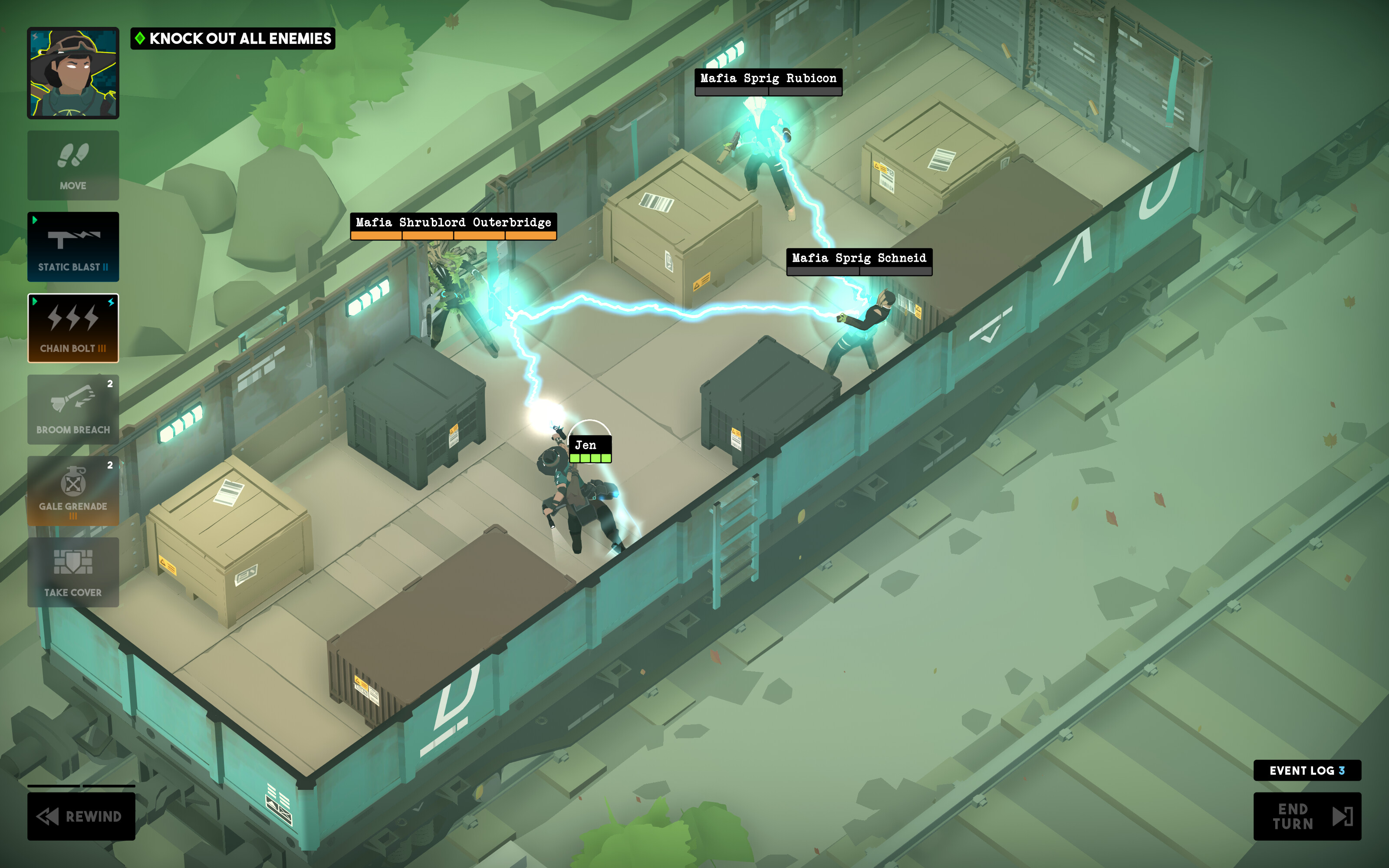
A player-controlled character striking three enemies with chain lightning in Tactical Breach Wizards.

Another game originally scheduled to be a computerized Squad Leader/ASL was Combat Mission. While not the first 3-D tactical warfare game, it set an industry standard for realism, thanks to minutely detailed armor penetration modelling. There was no first-person element to the game, which placed a realistic burden of command on the player, and unlike earlier games like M-1 Tank Platoon or Muzzle Velocity, human intervention wasn't necessary to ensure that one's troops were capable of fighting with the same skill as the computer enemy. Combat Mission: Beyond Overlord received critical acclaim upon release in 2000. Two follow up games were released in 2002 and 2004, which improved the infantry game with better suppression and automatic fire modelling. The game featured a "WEGO" system, where orders were entered sequentially, and the turn was then executed simultaneously, with a "Tactical AI" carrying out both sets of orders. This type of system had been what the original board wargame designers of Firefight et al. had dreamed of, but were restricted to creating manually.

== Types ==
=== Tactical wargames ===
Tactical wargames are a type of wargames (board game or video game) that models military conflict at a tactical level, i.e. units range from individual vehicles and squads to platoons or companies. These units are rated based on types and ranges of individual weaponry.

=== Tactical role-playing games ===
This subgenre is principally used to refer to RPG-derived games as an alternative to the traditional turn-based system. In such titles, the system has been tailored to incorporate role-playing game characteristics. The term "tactical" was not widely used to describe such titles until Final Fantasy Tactics was released, where it popularized the genre in North America, although games such as Shining Force were part of the genre years beforehand.

=== MMO ===
There are several turn-based tactical games with multiplayer online gameplay featuring large numbers of players, such as Dofus, Gunrox, and PoxNora. Darkwind: War on Wheels, a combat-oriented auto racing simulation, is the only turn-based tactical game currently to have a persistent world. It is also one of the few games to simulate turn-based auto racing.

=== Genre blurring ===
Some role-playing video games, such as The Temple of Elemental Evil and the Gold Box games of the late '80s and early '90s, also feature tactical turn-based combat. Some turn-based tactics titles, such as Jagged Alliance 2 and the X-COM series, feature a real-time strategic layer in addition to tactical turn-based combat.
