= Index of Windows games (Z) =

This is an index of Microsoft Windows games.

This list has been split into multiple pages. Please use the Table of Contents to browse it.

Title	Released	Developer	Publisher
Z	2014	The Bitmap Brothers	Virgin Interactive
Z: Steel Soldiers	2001	Bitmap Brothers	EON Digital Entertainment, SCi
ZanZarah: The Hidden Portal	2002	Funatics Development	THQ
Zapper: One Wicked Cricket	2002	Blitz Games, Atomic Planet Entertainment	Infogrames
Zax: The Alien Hunter	2000	Reflexive Entertainment	JoWooD Productions
Zeno Clash	2009	ACE Team	Valve, Noviy Disk
Zeno Clash 2	2013	ACE Team	Atlus
Zero Critical	1999	Istvan Pely Productions	Bethesda Softworks
Zero Parades: For Dead Spies	2026	ZA/UM	ZA/UM
ZeroRanger	2018	System Erasure	System Erasure
ZeroZone	1997	Cryo Interactive	Cryo Interactive
Zeus: Master of Olympus	2000	Impressions Games	Sierra Entertainment
Zineth	2012	Arcane Kids	Arcane Kids
Zombie Army 4: Dead War	2020	Rebellion Developments	Rebellion Developments
Zombie Army Trilogy	2015	Rebellion Developments	Rebellion Developments
ZombiU	2015	Ubisoft Montpellier	Ubisoft
Zoo Empire	2004	Enlight Software	Enlight Software
Zoo Tycoon	2000	Blue Fang Games	Microsoft Game Studios
Zoo Tycoon 2	2004	Blue Fang Games	Microsoft Game Studios
Zoo Vet	2004	Legacy Interactive	Legacy Interactive
Zoochosis	2024	Clapperheads	Clapperheads
Zoria: Age of Shattering	2024	Tiny Trinket Games	Anshar Publishing
Zork Nemesis	1996	Zombie Studios	Activision
Zork: Grand Inquisitor	1997	Activision	Activision
Zuma	2003	PopCap Games	PopCap Games
Zwei: The Arges Adventure	2002	Nihon Falcom	Nihon Falcom
Zwei: The Ilvard Insurrection	2008	Nihon Falcom	Nihon Falcom
