= Rock of Ages =

Rock of Ages is an epithet that is used in some translations of Isaiah 26:4 and may refer to:

== Films ==
- Rock of Ages (1918 film), a British silent film by Bertram Phillips
- Rock of Ages (2012 film), a film adaptation of the jukebox musical (see below)

== Music ==
- Rock of Ages (musical), a 2006 rock jukebox musical
- Rock of Ages Festival, an annual music festival in Calistoga, California, U.S.

=== Hymns ===
- "Rock of Ages" (Christian hymn), a 1763 hymn by the Reverend Augustus Montague Toplady
- "Rock of Ages" (Hanukkah hymn), a translation of the Jewish liturgical poem Ma'oz Tzur

=== Albums ===
- Rock of Ages (The Band album), 1972
- Rock of Ages: The Definitive Collection, a 2005 album by Def Leppard
  - Rock of Ages: The DVD Collection, a 2005 DVD by Def Leppard
- Rock of Ages... Hymns and Faith, a 2005 album by Amy Grant
- Rock of Ages (Original Broadway Cast Recording), a 2009 album
- Rock of Ages: Original Motion Picture Soundtrack, a 2012 album

=== Songs ===
- "Rock of Ages" (Def Leppard song), a 1983 song by Def Leppard
- "Rock of Ages", a song by Gillian Welch from Hell Among the Yearlings
- "Rock of Ages", a song by Grant Lee Buffalo from Mighty Joe Moon
- "Rock of Ages", a song by Jobriath from Jobriath
- "The Rock of Ages", a song by Magnolia Electric Co. from Josephine

== Places ==
- Rock of Ages (Wyoming), a mountain in the Teton Range, Grand Teton National Park, Wyoming, USA
- Rock of Ages Light, a U.S. Coast Guard lighthouse near Isle Royale, Michigan
- The Rock of Ages, a cliff in Burrington Combe in Somerset, England

== Other uses ==
- Rock of Ages (video game), a 2011 action-strategy video game
  - Rock of Ages II: Bigger & Boulder, the 2017 sequel
  - Rock of Ages III: Make & Break, the 2020 sequel
- Rock of Ages Corporation, a granite quarrying and finishing company in Graniteville, Vermont
- Rocks of Ages, a 1999 book by Stephen Jay Gould
