= Clash: Artifacts of Chaos =

- Developer: ACE Team
- Publisher: Nacon
- Designer: Carlos Bordeu
- Writer: Jonas Kyratzes
- Composer: Patricio Meneses
- Series: Zeno Clash
- Engine: Unreal Engine 4
- Platforms: Windows; PlayStation 4; PlayStation 5; Xbox One; Xbox Series X/S
- Release: March 9, 2023
- Genres: Action-adventure, beat 'em up
- Mode: Single-player

Clash: Artifacts of Chaos is a 2023 action-adventure game developed by ACE Team and published by Nacon. The game is the third installment in the Zeno Clash series. It was released for PlayStation 4, PlayStation 5, Windows, Xbox One, and Xbox Series X/S on March 9, 2023, to mixed reviews from critics.

== Gameplay ==
Like the previous titles of the series, the gameplay of Clash: Artifacts of Chaos is centered on unarmed melee combat. While its two predecessors used exclusively a first-person perspective during gameplay sequences, the third installment plays mostly in third-person perspective. First person is limited to brief sequences which can lead to the execution of finisher attacks.

Combat against intelligent beings can be preceded by a round of the Ritual, a dice game that grants a tactical advantage to the winner from a range of options, such as an extra ally or a fog cloud opaque only to the adversary.

For the first time in the series, the game features a character customization system including attributes to increase when leveling up and combat stances to unlock, such as the Spear stance which grants long reach attacks.

Another innovation to the series is the maze-like world design: instead of maps divided by loading screens, Clash: Artifacts of Chaos takes place in a semi-open world inspired by Bloodborne.

== Premise ==
The story of Clash: Artifacts of Chaos takes place in Zenozoik, the fantasy setting of Zeno Clash and Zeno Clash 2. The protagonist is a martial artist named Pseudo who becomes the bodyguard of the Boy, a small creature with healing powers desired by the tyrant Gemini and her henchmen.

== Development ==
Clash: Artifacts of Chaos uses a unique cross-hatched rendering filter which gives it a hand-painted pencil style.

After a first collaboration with ACE Team on SolSeraph and The Eternal Cylinder, The Talos Principle writer Jonas Kyratzes has been involved in the development of Clash: Artifacts of Chaos.

== Release ==
Clash: Artifacts of Chaos was announced at the Nacon Connect online press conference in July 2021 with a release originally scheduled for June 2022, but was postponed to November 2022, then February 9, 2023, and later March 9, 2023.

A free demo was distributed at the Steam Next Fest of October 2022 and at the ID@Xbox Winter Game Demo Event.

== Reception ==
Clash: Artifacts of Chaos

Aggregate score
Aggregator	Score		
Aggregator	PC	PS5	Xbox Series X/S
Metacritic	69/100	77/100	72/100

Review scores
Publication	Score		
Publication	PC	PS5	Xbox Series X/S
PC Gamer (UK)	64/100	N/A	N/A
Multiplayer.it	8/10	N/A	N/A
Gaming Age	C+	N/A	N/A
The Jimquisition	N/A	9/10	N/A
PlayStation Universe	N/A	8/10	N/A

Clash: Artifacts of Chaos received "mixed or average" reviews from critics for the PC and Xbox Series X/S versions, while the PS5 version received "generally favorable" reviews, according to review aggregator website Metacritic.

PC Gamer's Jon Bailes highlighted the surreal and colorful world design, continuing the series' tradition, but the game is spoiled by "uncompromising combat" with fluctuating difficulty that "lacks a sense of achievement" and confusing level design that "spread[s] out [...] in bewildering fashion" and lacks distinctive geography ultimately leaving the player lost.

Rock Paper Shotgun's Ed Thorn also pointed out the visual appeal and graphical style of the game. He also mentioned the confusing level design with no compass or waypoints, just a zoomed out map that is vaguely helpful. The series' signature hand-to-hand combat is "super tricky" with "careless [...] difficulty spikes". The artifact and ritual system lacks impact and can be ignored completely. In summary, Thorn described the game having a magnetic allure and quirkiness with frustrating exploration and difficult combat.

Eleven days after release Ace Team co-founder Carlos Bordeau posted: "I don't think we ever had such a giant disconnect between the critic scores and the players. Clash stands at an incredible 95% Steam approval rating (highest for any of our titles) ...and the press reviews are mostly: 'meh'." Almost two years after release Steam user reviews remain "very positive" while Metacritic user score reflects a "mixed or average" opinion.
