= Allen Stroud =

Researcher and university lecturer

- Born: Allen James Stroud; 1976/1977; Winchester, England
- Occupations: Academic; writer
- Employers: Coventry University; Snapshot Games
- Known for: Sci-fi Fantasy Writing
- Notable work: Writing for Elite: Dangerous, Chaos Reborn, Phoenix Point
- Stroud's voice recorded in October 2019
- Website: www.allenstroud.com

Allen James Stroud (born 1976/1977) is a researcher and university lecturer at Coventry University. He is currently leading the Creative Futures project, a funded research partnership between Coventry University and the Defence Science and Technology Laboratory (DSTL). Previously, he was Course Leader for the BA Media (Hons) Top Up and BA (Hons) Media and Communications. Before that, he was the course leader for Film and Television Production and the Creative Writing for Publication degrees at Bucks New University. Up until the end of 2019, he was the editor of the British Fantasy Society Journal. He also composes instrumental music; however, Stroud is best known for his sci-fi fantasy novels and video game writing. He was the 2017 2018, 2021 and 2023 chair of Fantasycon, the annual convention of the British Fantasy Society, which hosts the British Fantasy Awards.

From June 2019 until June 2025, Allen Stroud was Chair of the British Science Fiction Association, he succeeded Donna Bond and was followed in the role by Stewart Hotston. He was the guest of honour at Novacon 53.

== Early life and education ==
Stroud was born in Winchester and grew up in Andover, Hampshire. Stroud graduated with a Bachelor of Arts (BA) in Theatre and Television Studies from the University of Winchester in 1999 and then a Master of Research (MRes) in Creative Writing from the University of Bedfordshire in 2005. He also pursued a Postgraduate Diploma and Certificate at Buckinghamshire New University. Stroud later returned to Winchester, completing a Ph.D. in 2017 titled An Investigation and Application of Writing Structures and World Development Techniques in Science Fiction and Fantasy.

== Video games ==
Stroud first became known for his video game writing with his work on world-building and novelisation of Video games such as Elite: Dangerous. For Elite: Dangerous, he wrote six guidebooks that inform the fictional narrative within the game and also serve to help other writers with the novelisation of their stories within the game's world. He also became a founding and continuing host of Lave Radio, a free podcast related to Elite: Dangerous that started in February 2013. His novelisation of the Elite: Dangerous game world began after he completed a successful Kickstarter campaign for the novel, Elite: Lave Revolution. Stroud is now working on a team which is developing a role-playing game set in the Elite: Dangerous game world.

Stroud's next video game world-building and novelisation work occurred with the development of Chaos Reborn. For Chaos Reborn, he worked collaboratively with the game's designer, Julian Gollop, to devise history and lore for the game world.

In 2017, Stroud worked with Gollop and Jonas Kyratzes to develop the dystopian world in the game Phoenix Point. Many of Stroud's short stories for Phoenix Point have been made available to readers for free.

Year	Video game	Developer
2014	Elite: Dangerous	Frontier Developments
2015	Chaos Reborn	Snapshot Games
2019	Phoenix Point	Snapshot Games
2020	Baldur's Gate III	Larian Studios

== Books and stories ==
Stroud has written for a variety of different short story anthologies. In 2016, his story "The Last Tank Commander" appeared in Crises and Conflicts from Newcon Press. Baen Books Editor David Afshariad selected this for the 2017 edition of The Year's Best Military & Adventure SF.

Stroud's story "Reader" appears in Alice Macklin's 2017 anthology Read This First.

In 2018, Stroud's story "Dancers" was included in 2001: An Odyssey in Words published by Newcon Press. This is an anthology published to commemorate the 100th birthday of the late Arthur C. Clarke and features work by Neil Gaiman, China Miéville, Peter Hamilton, Stephen Baxter (author), Alastair Reynolds and Pat Cadigan amongst others.

In 2020, Grimbold Books published Forgotten Sidekicks which features Stroud's short story, "Saving Simon" - a spiritual successor to John Wagner's 1981 short story "Sinful Simon".

Year	Book	Series	Genre	ISBN-10	ASIN	Publisher
2011	A Bag of Bedtime Tales	N/A	Various	N/A	B006PS20WW	HWS Press
2012	The Sword of Wisimir	The Wisimir Tales (Book 1)	Fantasy	1533198853	B00AO614NW	HWS Press
2012	The Dragon of Wisimir	The Wisimir Tales (Book 2)	Fantasy	1535033967	B00AO6IW0K	HWS Press
2013	The Lord of Wisimir	The Wisimir Tales (Book 3)	Fantasy	1535045388	B00FIOIK2I	HWS Press
2015	Elite: Lave Revolution		Science fiction	1910987131	B010GGFAWK	HWS Press
2016	Dreams of Chaos	The Death of Gods Trilogy (Book 1)	Fantasy	1910987085	B01GY41FS6	HWS Press
2016	Chaos Reborn: The Loremaster's Guide	N/A	Fantasy	1910987123	N/A	HWS Press
2016	ToryTimes: A Collection of Tragic Poems	N/A	Poetry	N/A	B01CAS0IS8	HWS Press
2017	The Forever Man	N/A	Fantasy	1910987123	B07577M5NT	Luna Press
2020	Fearless	The Fractal Series Book 1	Science fiction	1787585423		Flame Tree Press
2022	Resilient	The Fractal Series Book 2	Science fiction	1787587150		Flame Tree Press
2023	Europa	The Fractal Series Episodes 1	Science fiction	1787588240		Flame Tree Press
2023	Ceres	The Fractal Series Episodes 2	Science fiction	1787588257		Flame Tree Press
2023	Lagrange Point	The Fractal Series Episodes 3	Science fiction	1787588264		Flame Tree Press
2023	Terra	The Fractal Series Episodes 4	Science fiction	1787588271		Flame Tree Press
2024	Luna	The Fractal Series Episodes 5	Science fiction	1787588288		Flame Tree Press
2024	Jezero	The Fractal Series Episodes 6	Science fiction	1787588295		Flame Tree Press
2024	Vigilance	The Fractal Series 3	Science fiction	1787589384		Flame Tree Press
