= Phoenix Point =

- Developer: Snapshot Games
- Publisher: Snapshot Games
- Designer: Julian Gollop
- Artist: Borislav Bogdanov
- Writers: Allen Stroud, Jonas Kyratzes
- Composer: John Broomhall
- Engine: Unity
- Platforms: Microsoft Windows, macOS, Xbox One, PlayStation 4, Stadia
- Release: Windows, macOS; December 3, 2019; Stadia; January 26, 2021; PlayStation 4, Xbox One; October 1, 2021
- Genres: Strategy, turn-based tactics
- Mode: Single-player

Phoenix Point is a strategy video game featuring a turn-based tactics system that is developed by Bulgaria-based independent developer Snapshot Games. It was released on December 3, 2019, for macOS and Microsoft Windows, for Stadia on January 26, 2021, and Xbox One and PlayStation 4 on October 1, 2021. Phoenix Point is intended to be a spiritual successor to the X-COM series that had been originally created by Snapshot Games head Julian Gollop during the 1990s.

Phoenix Point is set in 2047 on an Earth in the midst of an alien invasion, with Lovecraftian horrors on the verge of wiping out humanity. Players start the game in command of a lone base, Phoenix Point, and face a mix of strategic and tactical challenges as they try to save themselves and the rest of humankind from annihilation by the alien threat.

Between battles, the aliens adapt through accelerated, evolutionary mutations to the tactics and technology which players use against them. Meanwhile, multiple factions of humans will pursue their own objectives as they compete with players for limited resources in the apocalyptic world. How players resolve these challenges can result in different endings to the game.

== Setting ==
In 2022, Earth's scientists discovered an extraterrestrial virus in permafrost that had begun to melt. Only about one percent of the virus's genome matched anything recorded by scientists up to that time. Named the Pandoravirus, humans and animals who came into contact with it mutated into horrific abominations. By the late 2020s, a global apocalypse began when melting polar icecaps released the Pandoravirus into the world's oceans. The alien virus quickly dominated the oceans, mutating sea creatures of every size into hybrid alien monsters capable of crawling on to land.

The oceans transformed in alien ways after which the Pandoravirus began to infect the world's landmasses with an airborne mutagenic mist. The mist was both a microbial contaminant and a conduit that networked the hive-mind of the Pandoravirus. Humanity was not prepared; everyone who failed to reach high ground where the mist could not reach succumbed to it. The monstrosities of this future world are intended to evoke themes of tentacles and unknown horror familiar to fans of H. P. Lovecraft. Likewise, the works of John Carpenter influence the themes of science fiction horror, particularly related to the mist that both hides alien monsters and creates them.

The game starts in 2047. The alien mist and monsters created by the Pandoravirus have overwhelmed and destroyed worldwide civilization, reducing the remnants of humanity to isolated havens that are sparsely spread across the planet. The Pandoravirus controls the oceans, contaminating all sea life, and has brought humans to the brink of extinction on land. Various factions control the havens of humanity, and they each have very different ideas of how to survive the alien threat.

=== Phoenix Project ===
Players begin the game as the leader of a cell of the Phoenix Project, a global and secretive organization. Since the 20th century, the Phoenix Project has been organized to be ready to help humanity in a time of worldwide peril. The Phoenix Project activates the members of players' cell who then gather at a base called Phoenix Point. The cell includes some of the world's best remaining soldiers, scientists and engineers. However, after they assemble under the players' leadership, no further instructions come from the Phoenix Project.

=== Disciples of Anu ===
The Disciples of Anu are a human cult with beliefs that synthesize parts of Abrahamic religions with aspects of pre-Pandoravirus doomsday cults. Their world view sees human nature as inherently corrupted by human biology. The Disciples of Anu worship an alien god, which they refer to as "the Dead God". Cultists view the alien mist as both punishment and salvation. They have found ways to develop human-alien hybrids. The process for doing so seems to involve the Disciples deliberately exposing humans to the mist in a way that can allow for the humans' intelligence to remain. The Disciples of Anu typically locate their havens in caves, and their haven leaders are called Exarchs. Disciples are led with absolute authority by a leader, the Exalted, who seems to exhibit highly advanced and stable mutations.

=== New Jericho ===
New Jericho is a militaristic human faction which seeks to fight the alien threat directly by building a superior force. They are led by Tobias West, a former billionaire who also is a veteran mercenary. West gained his prominence in the 2020s as the head of Vanadium Inc., a technology and security firm which provided escorts for container ships as they traveled the world's oceans when the Pandoravirus mist and mutations first began to appear. Being a league of human-focused survivalists, New Jericho seeks to wipe out every trace of the aliens on Earth. Their leaders consider warfare and military technology, including enhancement of humans through technology, as the only solution to the alien threat. However they have conflicting ideas among themselves that threaten to splinter their faction before they can realize their objectives. New Jericho havens typically are fortresses at abandoned industrial or hilltop locations, and they have an extensive manufacturing base for military technology. Allied with the Phoenix Project, they successfully place a targeting beacon at the alien control node allowing for a decapitation strike. With the aliens leaderless, the war shifts in humanity's favor leading to an eventual victory. All of humanity is thus united under one government, and the Phoenix Project is given the resources to continue with its original mission and prepare for the origin of the Pandoravirus.

=== Synedrion ===
Synedrion have the most advanced technology of all the human factions. They are radical ecologists who seek to build a new and better human civilization out of the detritus of the old. They value knowledge and seek to form a global nation that exists in partnership with both its citizens and the environment. Viewing aliens as part of Earth's environmental landscape, Synedrion seek to coexist with the aliens by using technology such as a wall that can repel the alien's mist. Synedrion generally place their havens on elevated hi-tech platforms. Overall, they are a decentralized organization that mostly is interconnected through shared philosophy and stable communication networks; however, havens that become disconnected from others prioritize self-sufficiency. The organizational decision-making of Synedrion is slow. Via an alliance with the Phoenix Project they are able to deliver a command virus into the alien control node, allowing them to take control of the Pandoravirus and use it to terraform the planet into one that is sustainably suited for the human race. The Phoenix Project resumes its original mandate.

== Gameplay ==
Phoenix Point is described as a spiritual successor to X-COM. In the 1990s, the original X-COM series of video games introduced and integrated global strategy and tactical combat through which players try to save Earth from alien invasions. Though a multiplayer mode has not been ruled out, a survey answered by likely players has focused on developing Phoenix Point as a single-player game. Novel ideas include having aliens mutate and evolve in semi-random ways as they try to adapt to players' tactics and technology. Altogether, Phoenix Point is described as adding new and improved gameplay dynamics to the genre.

=== Mutating aliens ===
An illustration of alien mutations

In Phoenix Point, the alien threat evolves as part of a gameplay system designed to generate a wide variety of challenges and surprises for players in tactical combat. Aliens encountered by players are procedurally generated on two basic levels: first, aliens will draw upon a pool of available, interchangeable body parts; second, aliens can change in size and shape. When the Pandoravirus encroaches on new regions, animals and other biological material found, including humans, are recombined to increase the pool of available body parts for the creation of new aliens, through mutations. For example, in Africa, the procedurally generated mutation system might mash up the body of a lion with body parts of humans and other animals to create alien monsters that resemble a Sphinx.

When aliens are victorious in combat, they may mutate more in order to use captured weapons and other technology. In contrast, aliens that are consistently defeated will continue to mutate in a natural selection process which mimics evolution. For example, a mutation might generate aliens with a new melee attack ability or a new defensive counter to certain types of weapons used by the players' soldiers. These mutations are somewhat random; however, the game's AI works in the background to find mutations that can defeat players' soldiers by discarding iterations that are unsuccessful. Aliens will continue to evolve until they develop a mutation that allows them to prevail in battle. Aliens with successful mutations then will be deployed in increasing numbers. Thus, the Pandoravirus responds and adapts to the tactics and technology used by players.

=== Competing factions ===
While players contend with the alien threat, there are AI-controlled human factions in Phoenix Point that interact with the game's world much like players. The Disciples of Anu, New Jericho, and Synedrion with their conflicting ideologies are the major non-player factions in the game. These factions control most of the world's remaining resources. There are also independent havens who the major factions will try to recruit, and their isolated survivors that still can be found scavenging outside of havens.

The three major factions have unique technologies, traits, and diplomatic relations with each other. They have short-term and long-term goals consistent with their ideologies, and they act to accomplish these goals. For example, the factions can work to expand and develop their havens while players do the same. Players can obtain unique technology from the other factions through conquest or trade. Each of the three major factions also have secrets that can help resolve the alien threat.

The major factions thus offer three different ways that players can end the game. Players can ally with only one of the major factions. Therefore, players are not able to get all technologies and secrets from all of the non-player factions in the same playthrough. Players have to choose one narrative path of the game that forsakes other options. This means that players are not able to obtain access to all of the ways to defeat the aliens in a single campaign.

=== Global strategy ===
A screenshot of the Geoscape from a June 2017 prototype

The world for each Phoenix Point campaign populates by means of procedural generation. Just to survive, players need to locate and acquire scarce resources and make strategic choices in how they obtain and use the resources. Players do not have a global reach initially, so they will have to expand thoughtfully. How players acquire resources can have dynamic ramifications for their relations with non-player human factions. Players can engage in open hostilities with other havens by either raiding them for resources or conquering their bases.

Players can exploit the conflicts of other factions through kidnappings, sabotage, assassinations, and military coups. Players also can pursue more diplomatic options such as mediating conflicts between factions, defending havens from attacks of aliens or rival factions, forming alliances, or trading. Resource scarcity compels players to deal with non-player factions one way or another, or else the factions will deal with the players. How players choose to interact with other factions will determine substantially the narrative that players experience in their gameplay. Meanwhile, non-player factions fight or ally with each other regardless of what players do. Players can interact with non-player factions much like in a 4X video game from the Civilization series.

In making strategic choices, players use a globe-shaped strategic user interface called a Geoscape. The Geoscape is a more complex version of the strategic user interfaces used in previous X-COM games. The Geoscape serves as the nexus for players to monitor their exploration and make choices concerning strategic operations, development, and relationships with other human factions. Players use the Geoscape to track the spread of the Pandoravirus mist, which correlates with alien activity. Players also use the Geoscape to deploy squads of soldiers on tactical combat missions to different locales spread around the world. For example, mission locations could be havens of other factions, scavenging sites at abandoned military or civilian infrastructure, alien encampments, players' bases, and other Phoenix Project facilities. Players even have missions where soldiers must venture on to the backs of city-sized alien land walkers while the mammoth monsters are moving and trying to rid themselves of the players' soldiers.

=== Tactical combat ===
A screenshot of a June 2017 prototype combat mission

Tactical combat mission environments are procedurally generated and destructible. Soldiers can deploy on combat missions with a large variety of weapon systems including flamethrowers, chemical weapons, and ordinary explosives. With the right technology, players are able to deploy aerial and ground-mobile drones. Players also can obtain access to vehicles with customization options that their soldiers can bring into battle for heavy weapon support and tactical transportation. Players can deploy squads of four to roughly sixteen soldiers, though limits on squad size are determined mostly by players' availability of healthy soldiers and transportation capacity. While players try to defeat their alien or human enemies in combat, enemies have their own objectives. For example, enemies who attack a haven or base will seek and try to destroy its vital functional elements. Aliens also will try to kill, eat, or abduct civilians they find on the battlefield. If players assault an enemy facility, soldiers can use stealth to avoid alerting the enemy to their presence; however, once alerted, enemies will seek out and attack the soldiers.

Combat occurs through turn-based moves which involve tactical options that are similar to those found in X-COM games. Each soldier has two basic actions to take in a turn such as moving and firing a weapon. Weapon fire that misses its target will hit something else and potentially injure or damage what it hits. Basic actions can be extended under two circumstances: first, if an enemy is spotted during a movement action, then the soldier halts so that the player can choose to react by firing or moving; second, soldiers have special actions that add to what they can do in a turn. Examples of special actions available to soldiers include overwatch and return fire options. Return fire allows units to retaliate against enemy weapon fire with their own weapon fire.

Soldiers have a willpower attribute which determines how many "will points" that a soldier has. Soldiers expend will points to take special actions. Soldiers lose will points from injuries, a comrade dying, encountering a horrifying monster, and special enemy attacks. A soldier whose will points fall below zero may panic or lose their sanity. Willpower can be regained through rest or through some special abilities such as a leader's rallying action. Willpower and will points relate to a system in Phoenix Point where combat can inflict lasting physical and even psychological injuries on soldiers. While soldiers can be injured, disabled, and knocked unconscious in battle, they are difficult to kill. The permanent death of soldiers, also called permadeath, is not a significant concern for players. The injuries which soldiers suffer and even just the ordinary experiences of battle can lead to drug addictions, permanent physical disabilities, or even insanity that will require players to research new technologies to rehabilitate.

During combat missions, players face a wide variety of enemies, including an evolving assortment of aliens. Some of the most challenging enemies that players eventually face are bus-sized, boss aliens. For example, one alien boss is called a Crab Queen. Among its abilities, a Crab Queen is able to create a microbial mist which reveals to the aliens on the battlefield any soldiers who enter it and which can buff or revive aliens; this mist creates a literal fog of war which actively works to advantage aliens in battle and otherwise bolsters the horror themes of the game. A Crab Queen also is able to spawn new aliens during combat that will quickly mutate into threats for soldiers on the battlefield. Such abilities of aliens often are locked to their use of particular body parts that can be targeted by weapons and tactical targeting therefore is able to help players to defeat giant boss aliens. Early screenshots of a game prototype show that Phoenix Point has a targeting system which works similarly to the V.A.T.S. used in Fallout. This targeting system provides a wider selection of tactical choices that players can make in combat to take down difficult foes. For example, a soldier might target a claw of an alien boss to disable a melee attack, an arm to disable a weapon, or an organ that gives the alien boss a special ability. These tactical options allow players to combat adversaries which may be significantly tougher than those found in more traditional X-COM games.

== Development ==
Julian Gollop and David Kaye founded Snapshot Games to create Chaos Reborn, a modern version of Gollop's own 1985 Chaos: The Battle of Wizards, which they released on October 26, 2015. Less than six months later, on March 18, 2016, Gollop used Twitter to provide the first teaser for the development of Phoenix Point. A team of eight Snapshot Games developers led by Gollop worked on designing and producing the game over the course of the next year. With Phoenix Point, Gollop returned to the X-COM genre he created.

After investing $450,000 into this first year of development, Snapshot Games launched a Fig crowdfunding campaign to obtain the $500,000 they budgeted to complete the game. In Bulgaria, where the studio is based, video game development costs are about a third of what they are in the United States. The campaign ended successfully on June 7, 2017, raising $765,948 from 10,314 contributors. Crediting the success of the campaign, Snapshot Games announced the next day that they had hired four developers and planned to grow their team to include around thirty by the end of the year.

Phoenix Point was initially expected to be released in the fourth quarter of 2018 through Steam and GOG for Microsoft Windows, macOS, and Linux platforms. Snapshot Games aims to sell at least one million copies of Phoenix Point. Gollop set this goal based on his confidence in the quality of the game being development and his belief that there is a strong interest in another X-COM game from its creator.

While it was initially anticipated for release in the fourth quarter of 2018, Snapshot Games announced in May 2018 that the title was now scheduled for release until late 2019, to give them more time to properly integrate the large amount of content from its team into the game. Gollop said in May 2018: "When we launched our crowdfunding campaign for Phoenix Point in May 2017, we hoped that the game would be well received. But what has happened since has been phenomenal, with increasingly strong pre-orders and great press coverage. People's expectations are higher, our team is growing, and Phoenix Point has become a bigger game."

While it was initially anticipated for release through Steam and GOG, Snapshot Games announced a one-year exclusivity deal with Epic Games Store for Microsoft Windows and macOS with one year of free DLC for its backers or a full refund by no later than April 12, 2019. Based on a report from one of the game's Fig investors, the Epic Games Store exclusivity deal was estimated to be worth about US$2.25 million. Gollop stated the added funds from the exclusivity deal would help assure a trouble-free launch and support early post-release content better.

=== Development team ===
Julian Gollop, original designer of UFO: Enemy Unknown (known as X-Com: UFO Defense in North America) and X-COM: Apocalypse, is the creative lead for Phoenix Point. The game's music is composed by John Broomhall, who had worked on UFO: Enemy Unknown, X-COM: Terror from the Deep, and X-COM: Apocalypse.

And all the other sounds are composed by Simon Dotkov.

Artists for the game include Svetoslav Petrov, who drafts and illustrates concept art; Aleksandar Ignatov, who sculpts concept art into Plasticine sculptures as a foundation for rendering 3D computer models; Samuil Stanoev, who creates 3D computer models; and Borislav Bogdanov, the game's art director. Petrov and Bogdanov previously worked in similar artistic roles on the development of Chaos Reborn.

Narrative content and lore are developed by writers, Allen Stroud and Jonas Kyratzes. Stroud provided world-building and novelization for other games, Chaos Reborn and Elite: Dangerous. Kyratzes provided writing for the story and premise of The Talos Principle that was noted for being as much responsible for its success as its gameplay mechanics.

=== Design inspirations ===
Having an open-world environment in which multiple AI-controlled human factions act on their own agendas, Gollop's own X-COM: Apocalypse (1997) provided a foundational example of the type of strategic gameplay that Gollop developed for Phoenix Point. In designing improvements to the strategic gameplay systems that Gollop developed in the 1990s, Gollop sought to add a grand strategy view. His plans for Phoenix Point borrow from grand strategy video games with procedural generation elements and emergent gameplay like Crusader Kings II. Sid Meier's Alpha Centauri similarly influenced how Gollop plans to develop more 4X-like dynamics into the open-world strategy aspects of Phoenix Point.

As for combat, the 2012 X-COM reboot, XCOM: Enemy Unknown, by Firaxis Games and its sequel, XCOM 2, inspire the turn-based tactical combat system and user interface found in Phoenix Point. In particular, the visual presentation of tactical combat missions looks similar to these X-COM games of the 2010s; however, the underlying tactical gameplay mechanics continued to draw inspiration from Gollop's 1994 original X-COM game, X-COM: UFO Defense. Phoenix Point also draws inspiration from the Fallout video game series with how players can target specific body parts of enemies during combat.

=== Lore stories ===
Phoenix Point writers, Allen Stroud and Jonas Kyratzes, wrote short stories which help establish the setting and narrative themes for the game. Other writers who contributed stories include Thomas Turnbull-Ross and Chris Fellows. With these stories, the writers seek to develop the dystopian world in which Phoenix Point occurs with tales of individuals from around the world who experience different aspects of the alien invasion at various points in the years leading up to the start of the game in 2047.

Snapshot Games made many of these stories available for free on the game's official website. It also plans to release a compendium of Phoenix Point stories for publication in ebook and print formats.

Stories published on the Phoenix Point website during development.
Announced	Story	Writer	Description	Cite
June 25, 2017	Disciples of Anu	Kyratzes	Phoenix Project analysis of the Disciples of Anu.	
June 26, 2017	New Jericho	Stroud	Phoenix Project analysis of New Jericho.	
June 26, 2017	Synedrion	Stroud	Phoenix Project analysis of Synedrion.	
June 27, 2017	The Old Man of the Sea	Stroud	First-person story of a woman in 1995 and her inheritance from her grandfather.	
June 28, 2017	The Hatch	Kyratzes	Transcript of hearing regarding a 1973 Phoenix Project mission to the Moon.	
June 29, 2017	The Tomb of the Phoenix	Kyratzes	First-person account of an expedition in 1937 to an island off the coast of Antarctica.	
June 30, 2017	Far Out There	Kyratzes	Transcript of a statement to US Phoenix Project investigators in 1978.	
July 1, 2017	Recruiting	Stroud	First-person story of a disabled military veteran approached by a recruiter from Vanadium Inc.	
July 2, 2017	The Curator	Turnbull-Ross	Excerpt of translated Arabic records from the office of a curator at a naval museum in Egypt.	
July 3, 2017	The Claimed Idol	Stroud	First-person story of a European hiker and his guide who come upon a structure in a rainforest.	
July 4, 2017	Fragments of Knowing	Stroud	First-person story that begins with a man waking up in a public toilet without a memory of his identity.	
July 5, 2017	Hafgufu	Turnbull-Ross	Transcript of voice recording translated from Norwegian.	
July 6, 2017	Semper Fidelis	Kyratzes	First-person account by a marine who has joined the Phoenix Project.	
July 7, 2017	Hanamaru Sushi	Fellows	First-person story of a person working at a conveyor belt sushi restaurant.	
July 8, 2017	Launch Codes	Stroud	First-person story of a man working at an Indian military base in 2032.	
July 9, 2017	The Second Step	Kyratzes	First-person story of a journalist traveling to Moscow with scientists studying the alien virus.	
July 10, 2017	Soulstealing	Stroud	First-person story of an English tourist in Bulgaria.	
July 11, 2017	Towards Freedom	Kyratzes	First-person story from a vantage of several people in Athens as the alien mist advances.	
July 12, 2017	Harbinger	Stroud	First-person story of a cancer survivor in the New American Republic.	
July 13, 2017	Dotada	Turnbull-Ross	Transcript from a translated Spanish journal found in a cave on the Argentinian coast.	
August 24, 2018	The Legend of Fort Bacon	Kyratzes	Story of Lt. Daniel Stoller and how he came to be imprisoned by New Jericho.	
August 24, 2018	Putting Bullets in Monsters	Kyratzes	Story of J.P. Richter, in New Jericho custody.	
August 24, 2018	The Interrogation	Stroud	Story of Lt. Irina Petyaeva's encounter with Subject 16.	
August 24, 2018	Heavy	Stroud	Story of Corporal Isaiah Thomson after his encounter with Lt. Petyaeva.	
August 24, 2018	Behold the Man	Kyratzes	Biography of Tobias West.	
October 9, 2018	Those Who Have Left Us	Stroud	Text fragments regarding a 2025 Pandoravirus outbreak in Valencia, Spain.	
October 17, 2018	The Cloud	Stroud	A 2027 news report of a strange organic cloud appearing over the South Pacific.	
October 11, 2019	The Mist	Alex Rinehart	A man encounters a strange mist on his way to work in 2029.	
October 25, 2019	Oysters	Andrew Cheyne	An anniversary meal goes horribly awry.	
November 22, 2019	Hope Dies Last	Jude Reid	A mother who has lost her baby is united with an infected baby and her elder sister.	
November 22, 2019	Last Entry	Michael O'Neal	A musician, infected with the Pandoravirus, talks about what he remembers of his former life as he gradually succumbs.	
December 2, 2019	Closing Bell	Ian Wilkes	Stock market traders watch the news as “The Big Egg” incident of 2026 unfolds before their eyes.	

== Reception ==
Reception

Aggregate score
Aggregator	Score
Metacritic	PC: 74/100; PS4: 64/100; PS4: 72/100 (extended edition)

Review scores
Publication	Score
Computer Games Magazine	6/10
Edge	8/10
GameSpot	8/10
IGN	7/10
PC Gamer (US)	77/100
PCGamesN	8/10
The Guardian	3/5
USgamer	3/5

Upon its release, Phoenix Point was met with "mixed or average" reviews from critics for Microsoft Windows, with an aggregate score of 74/100 on Metacritic.

PcGamer's reviewer praises the game's visual design, while claiming the sound design and music are bad. Still, he claims the game was so good he didn't care. Still, he notices weak combat AI and bugs. He concluded that the game was full of interesting ideas, but that it was also "buggy" and its state was "a bit of a mess". IGN said that the game was "in a state that still feels very experimental and unrefined". Polygon wrote that the game felt "unbalanced", was "between onerous and dull" and that the tactical battles were "simply abysmal".

GameSpot reviewer felt the game arouses strong emotions: "It's [choosing sides between conflicting human factions] a depressing, relevant example of humanity's failure to come together in the face of existential catastrophe". He also wrote that it is "genuinely painful" to lose a settlement. He praised the system of aiming in the game ("if you can see something, you can hit it"). However, he complains about the interface on the strategical level. He concluded: "It's a game that feels more concerned with experimentation than perfection, that's more interested in discovering new paths to take than walking one that's already well-trodden."

The Guardian's reviewer praised "complex political metagame" in the game, noting that it is strategically deeper than X-COM, even though he notes "X-COM-style games are designed to be engines of tension; emotional rollercoasters that pit you against impossible odds". However, he noted that "The soundtrack [of Phoenix Point] has no fanfare whatsoever", and the story is intriguing, but presented without drama. He concluded: "Phoenix Point has double the number of teeth [of X-COM] but a less effective bite."

PCGamesN reviewer did not agree with GameSpot about the aiming in the game, as he writes it does not give more control, as there are many external factors influencing where a shot lands. He also disagreed with The Guardian about the music in the game, opining that "the music and audio effects are wonderfully rich and atmospheric".

According to Edge, manual aiming "is a great idea which puts added emphasis on distance and weapon type" as some weapons are more precise than others.

Network N Strategy Gamer wrote of the game's "lack of character" compared to XCOM: Enemy Unknown and that it "doesn't seem to have found that human touch that made Firaxis' own take so appealing."
