= Rock of Ages 2: Bigger & Boulder =

2017 video game

- Developer: ACE Team
- Publishers: Atlus USA; Sega (NS)
- Producers: Andrés Bordeu; Carlos Bordeu
- Designers: Andrés Bordeu; Carlos Bordeu
- Programmer: Leo Benaducci
- Artist: Edmundo Bordeu
- Composer: Patricio Meneses
- Engine: Unreal Engine 4
- Platforms: PlayStation 4, Windows, Xbox One, Nintendo Switch
- Release: Windows; 28 August 2017; PlayStation 4, Xbox One: NA: 28 August 2017; PAL: 29 August 2017; Nintendo Switch; 14 May 2019
- Genres: Tower defense, racing
- Modes: Single-player, multiplayer

Rock of Ages 2: Bigger & Boulder is a tower defense racing video game developed by ACE Team and published by Atlus USA. The game is the sequel to the 2011 Rock of Ages, and was released in August 2017 for PlayStation 4, Windows, and Xbox One. A Nintendo Switch port of the game released in May 2019.

== Gameplay ==
Players must build their boulders, and roll them into the enemy gates as fast as possible, eventually breaking through and squish everything. This simple task is made more difficult by both sides' ability to pepper each other's lanes with traps, obstacles, and defenses.

== Development ==
Rock of Ages 2 was teased following the release of The Deadly Tower of Monsters, with ACE Team stating to already be "pretty deep in [another project], unannounced yet." In June 2016, this project was announced to be Rock of Ages 2, and that was originally announced for a Q3 2016 release on PlayStation 4, Windows, and Xbox One, but was delayed until 28 August 2017.

== Reception ==
Reception

Aggregate score
Aggregator	Score
Metacritic	(PC) 85/100 (PS4) 79/100 (XOne) 78/100 (NS) 75/100

Review scores
Publication	Score
4Players	74%
Destructoid	(PS4) 7.5/10
Hardcore Gamer	(PS4) 4/5
Nintendo Life	(NS) 8/10
Nintendo World Report	(NS) 7.5/10
Push Square	(PS4) 7/10
Reno Gazette-Journal	(NS) 7/10

The game received "generally favourable reviews" on all platforms according to the review aggregation website Metacritic.

== Sequel ==
A second sequel, Rock of Ages 3: Make & Break, was released for Nintendo Switch, PlayStation 4, Windows, and Xbox One on 21 July 2020, and released for Stadia on 14 August 2020.
