= Serious Sam VR: The Last Hope =

2017 video game

- Cover art featuring the playable characters, Serious Sam (right) and Serious Sammy
- Developer: Croteam VR
- Publisher: Devolver Digital
- Director: Davor Hunski
- Designers: Davor Hunski; Mario Kotlar
- Programmers: Alen Ladavac; Davor Hunski
- Artist: Davor Hunski
- Writers: Jonas Kyratzes; Verena Kyratzes
- Composer: Damjan Mravunac
- Series: Serious Sam
- Engine: Serious Engine
- Platform: Windows
- Release: 20 September 2017
- Genre: First-person shooter
- Modes: Single-player, multiplayer

Serious Sam VR: The Last Hope is a 2017 first-person shooter game for virtual reality (VR) developed by Croteam VR and published by Devolver Digital. One or two players fight waves of enemies, including bosses, across five thematic planets. The enemies approach from a 180° field and the player can use dual-wielded weapons while moving across a limited space. To develop The Last Hope and experiment with other VR implementations, Croteam VR was established as a specialised division of Croteam. Devolver Digital announced the game at E3 in June 2016 and launched it in early access that October. After several updates, it was released in September 2017 for Windows with compatibility for the HTC Vive and Oculus Rift VR headsets. The Last Hope received mostly positive reviews, with post-release reception lauding the game's gameplay and visuals while criticising difficulty spikes and issues with the online multiplayer mode.

== Gameplay ==
A Beheaded Kamikaze approaches the player, who brandishes two pistols.

Serious Sam VR: The Last Hope is a first-person shooter played in virtual reality (VR) from a standing or seated position. There are twenty levels, four set on each of the five thematic planets. The player is mostly stationary and can only move around in a limited space. Enemies with varying attack patterns approach in waves from various positions in a 180° field, eventually reaching bosses. The player uses various weapons—including ranged weapons (such as pistols, shotguns, and rocket launchers), chainsaws for melee, and hybrid weapons like power swords—and can wield up to two at a time. They can evade enemy attacks through physical movement or by using a shield. Good performance in a level grants the player weapon upgrades, additional skills and power-ups, such as increased damage against enemies and time slowdowns. All levels can be played cooperatively with a second player through means like online matchmaking. The "Endless Wave" and "Arena" modes each let the player face off against random sets of enemies across eight levels.

== Development and release ==
Croatian game studio Croteam began experimenting with VR games when it received development units of the HTC Vive and Oculus Rift. Davor Hunski, later the lead designer of The Last Hope, gained a strong interest in VR and convinced colleagues to develop games for the platform. Croteam subsequently formed a specialised VR division, Croteam VR, led by Hunski. Croteam members also examined existing VR games offered on Steam but were unsatisfied and wanted to "show the world how it's done". The development team incrementally added VR features to Serious Engine, Croteam's in-house game engine, and added rudimentary support for both VR headsets to their game The Talos Principle. Impressed with the immersion this support provided, the team expanded it to Croteam's Serious Sam games. However, they found that the existing control schemes were problematic and induced headaches, requiring them to settle on either using teleportation for movement or creating a mostly stationary game. They considered creating proper movement options the biggest challenge of VR game development. For the stationary approach, the developers created a test level with some enemies and weapons from previous Serious Sam games. This prototype proved popular among Croteam employees and the team decided to pivot towards a releasable game. They re-used further elements and tweaked them for higher graphical fidelity and created original environments, enemies, and weapons using tools like Autodesk 3ds Max, Autodesk Maya, and Autodesk MotionBuilder.

Narrative elements were developed by Jonas and Verena Kyratzes. They wrote The Last Hope as a training simulation for the protagonist, Serious Sam, based on his experiences. This allowed them to connect the story elements to the Serious Sam canon while leaving much flexibility for future work, as Sam's recollection would not need to be entirely accurate. The writers presented several thematic introductions to Croteam, which chose the most appropriate one. Individual "mini-stories" for the game's levels were created with input on worldbuilding from the studio. The narrative corrected certain lore issues that had been introduced with the series's previous major entry, Serious Sam 3: BFE. Croteam and publisher Devolver Digital announced The Last Hope on 13 June 2016, at that year's E3 game conference. For promotional efforts, Croteam commissioned three minigun props, outfitted with a rotating barrel and an integrated HTC Vive controller, that could be used to control the game. It was also exhibited at Gamescom in August that year. Oculus VR offered to support the development of The Last Hope with an undisclosed but substantial financial contribution in exchange for temporary exclusivity of the game on the Oculus Rift via the Oculus Store. According to level and game designer Mario Kotlar, the development team turned down this offer because they disliked exclusivity deals and because they believed that "truly good games will sell by themselves".

The game was made available in early access for Windows on 17 October 2016 with support for the HTC Vive. As Croteam's first early access game and first VR title, The Last Hope was to be a testbed for potential further VR games. Support for the Oculus Rift was added when its motion controller system, Oculus Touch, was released in December that year. To ensure compatibility with the Oculus Rift's tracking system, levels with 360° movement were not implemented. Throughout the early access phase, which was to last six months, Croteam looked to shape the game according to player feedback. Cooperative gameplay, a feature that had never been planned, was added in December 2016 due to high demand. Further features, such as new levels and weapons, were added through major updates in April and June 2017. For the latter, the team suffered a setback when, during an association football match at the April 2017 Reboot Develop game conference, developers Hunski and Davor Tomičić suffered injuries, with Hunski having to undergo surgery. They returned to the Croteam offices sometime thereafter to finish their work while taking painkillers. Skill trees and power-ups were added in a July 2017 update.

The soundtrack for The Last Hope, composed by Damjan Mravunac, was released via YouTube in July 2017. The game left early access on 20 September 2017 with a last major update. Croteam also developed Serious Sam VR: Arcade, a version of The Last Hope for location-based entertainment facilities, such as video arcades. The Last Hope was among the first games supported by Variable Rate Supersampling (VRSS)—a technology developed by Nvidia to improve the image quality of VR games using supersampling—when it was introduced in January 2020.

== Reception ==
Reception

Review score
Publication	Score
UploadVR	8.5/10

During its early access period, Serious Sam VR: The Last Hope was subject to a mixed reception. Jason Bohn of Hardcore Gamer lauded the game's gunplay and tense atmosphere but noted that, although common series elements were present, it did not feel like a "true entry" in the franchise. David Jagneaux of UploadVR welcomed the intensity of the gameplay and the sense of power presented by dual-wielding virtual guns. Alec Meer of Rock Paper Shotgun opined that the Serious Sam series's gameplay style was ideal for VR and that The Last Hope, therefore, formed one of the better VR shooters at the time, especially with the dual-wielding functionality. In contrast, Kevin Joyce of VRFocus labelled The Last Hope as "derivative" and "essentially another stand-and-shoot affair just like the many that already litter the HTC Vive software library".

Upon release, Tal Blevins reviewed The Last Hope for UploadVR, praising the game's pace and stratagem. He also commended the visuals and variety of weapons and enemies. However, he criticised large disparities between the difficulty levels and faulted poor matchmaking and server errors in the multiplayer component. PC Gamer and Rock Paper Shotgun each included The Last Hope in their lists of best VR games in April 2020.
