= Abyss Odyssey =

2014 platform action-adventure video game

- Developer: ACE Team
- Publishers: Atlus; Sega (Windows)
- Engine: Unreal Engine 3
- Platforms: Windows, PlayStation 4, PlayStation 3, Xbox 360
- Release: Windows, PS3: WW: 15 July 2014; PAL: 16 July 2014 (PS3); Xbox 360; 16 July 2014; PS4: NA: 28 July 2015; PAL: 30 July 2015
- Genres: Platform, action-adventure
- Modes: Single-player, multiplayer

Abyss Odyssey is a platform action-adventure video game developed by ACE Team and published by Atlus. It was released in July 2014 for the Xbox 360, PlayStation 3, and Microsoft Windows, and for the PlayStation 4 in July 2015.

The game's plot follows a set of heroes who fight to reach a warlock whose dreams are infecting reality in late 19th century Santiago, Chile. Abyss Odyssey combines elements from multiple video game genres, has a unique art style based on the Art Nouveau movement and has characters based on Chilean mythology. It received mostly positive reviews from critics who praised its atmosphere but criticized some aspects of gameplay.

== Gameplay ==
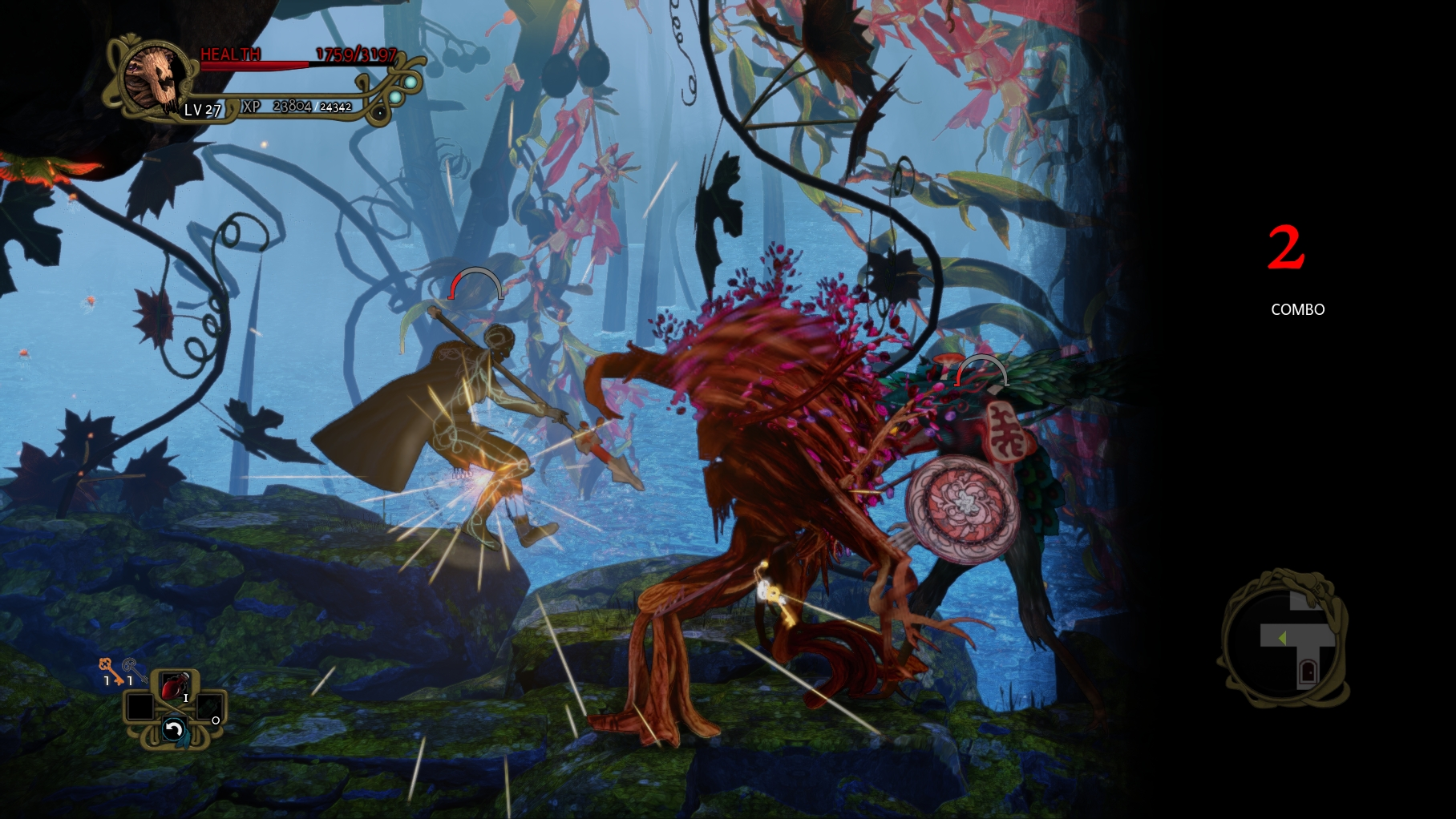
The game's developers described Abyss Odyssey's fighting style as "a bit like Street Fighter meets Super Smash Bros."

The gameplay has a fusion of elements from a number of gaming genres. The player controls an avatar who battles enemies and advances through dungeons to reach the conclusion of the stage. The game's levels are procedurally generated, providing a new experience on each. The player only has one life but may be revived. If the player character dies, the player is put in control of a much weaker human who tries to avenge their death and can revive the player at specific altars.

The game's fighting system combines elements of the Super Smash Bros. and Street Fighter franchises, and rewards players for timing their blocks and attacks at the right moment. Players can capture the souls of enemies they encounter—once collected, a player can then assume the form and abilities of the enemy in-game. Abyss Odyssey uses a community-based unlock system; upon its launch, only the first "phase" of the game was available. After a certain number of players defeat the game's final boss, the Warlock, the next phase of the game is unlocked for all players.

== Development ==
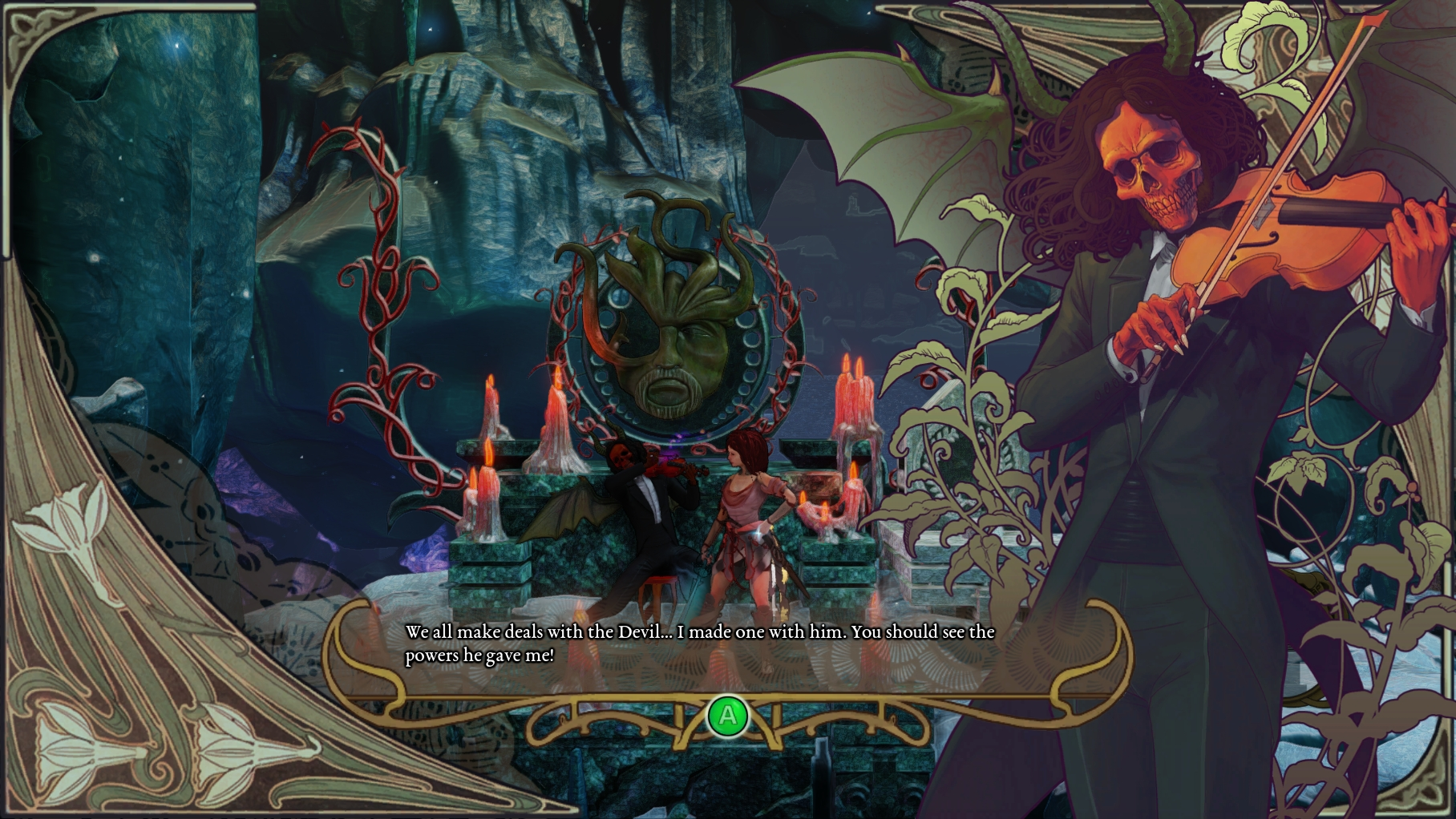
The art was inspired by the works of Harry Clarke

Developer ACE Team revealed Abyss Odyssey on their blog on 4 March 2014. The developers were inspired by the Art Nouveau movement and they used Harry Clarke as a direct reference for much of the game's art and atmosphere. The developers intended the game to be extremely replayable and designed the combat mechanics to be simple to understand, after initially considering a more complicated fighting layout.

An Enhanced Edition titled Abyss Odyssey: Extended Dream Edition introduced competitive multiplayer as well as new types of enemies and bosses to the game and was released for the PlayStation 4 in July 2015. A "nightmare" difficulty mode is included in the Enhanced Edition.

== Reception ==
Reception

Aggregate score
Aggregator	Score
Metacritic	(PS3) 70/100 (PC) 69/100 (PS4) 65/100 (X360) 64/100

Review scores
Publication	Score
Destructoid	(PC) 7/10
Eurogamer	(PC) 8/10
GameTrailers	(PC) 7/10
GameZone	8/10
Hardcore Gamer	(PC) 4/5
IGN	6.7/10
PlayStation Official Magazine – Australia	(PS3) 65%
Official Xbox Magazine (UK)	(X360) 7/10
PC Gamer (UK)	(PC) 55%
Push Square	(PS4) 7/10
RPGFan	(PS4) 70%
USgamer	(PC) 3/5
Metro	(PS3) 6/10
Slant Magazine	(PS4) 3.5/5

The game received "mixed or average reviews" on all platforms according to the review aggregation website Metacritic. Critics praised the game's art style and atmosphere, but were disappointed by some of its game mechanics and its repetitive nature.

Eurogamer's Dan Whitehead praised the PC version's visuals and new ideas in a positive review, but felt that there was a "... sense that in straddling so many genres, the game has spread itself a little thin." IGN's Richard Cobbett compared the same PC version's roguelike elements unfavorably to The Binding of Isaac and Spelunky, but noted that "the soundtrack is fantastic, and the art is even better." Hardcore Gamer's James Cunningham likened the art style to "playing a Grateful Dead album cover" and called it "a quirky little gaming gem."

Reception to the combat system was mixed. Destructoid's Alasdair Duncan felt that the combat system was "enjoyable and deep" and provided one of the main reasons to play the game, while PC Gamer's Emanuel Maiberg derided what he felt to be the game's sluggish control input and compared the game negatively to the Super Smash Bros. series that its fighting system is based on.
