= The Sea Will Claim Everything =

2012 video game

- Developers: Jonas & Verena Kyratzes
- Publisher: Jonas Kyratzes
- Designers: Jonas & Verena Kyratzes
- Composer: Chris Christodoulou
- Series: Lands of Dream
- Engine: Multimedia Fusion
- Platform: Microsoft Windows
- Release: WW: May 23, 2012 (March 24, 2016 on Steam)
- Genres: Adventure, visual novel
- Mode: Single-player

The Sea Will Claim Everything is a point-and-click adventure game, the first commercial video game from design team Jonas and Verena Kyratzes. Written by Jonas Kyratzes with graphics from Verena Kyratzes, it is the fourth game in their Lands of Dream series and was released May 25, 2012. It features a musical score by Chris Christodoulou. The game is available from the author's website and has occasionally been bundled with other games from various digital download portals. It was released on Steam on March 24, 2016.

== Setting and Plot ==
The player is summoned via a "window" (represented by the game's UI) by The Mysterious-Druid ("The" being his given name and "Mysterious-Druid" his family name) to the Fortunate Isles, an archipelago ruled by Lord Urizen and inhabited by anthropomorphic animals and fantasy creatures. They lives in Underhome, a living and sentient building located mostly underground on the Isle of the Moon. Underhome was invaded a short time ago by Urizen's henchmen who claimed that Underhome was to be foreclosed. They was able to drive them off, but Underhome was damaged and is in distress. The player is tasked to help restore Underhome, find out more about the foreclosure and search for The's girlfriend Niamh.

The player travels to several other islands, the largest being the Isle of the Sun (resembling Greece) and the Isle of the Stars (resembling North Africa), talks with many inhabitants, finds objects which can help them and ingredients with which several potions can be brewed, e.g. a Potion of Agility which is needed to cross a gorge over a fallen tree trunk. The player finds out that Lord Urizen and the islands' mayors, all shown as floating skulls, have conspired to exploit their citizens financially. The foreclosure was triggered by a new tax which The did not know about but has to pay. The player also finds Niamh and she tells them that Urizen also pollutes the islands.

The player is told about a hidden treasure which they search to help pay the tax. But when the player finally finds the treasure, it is immediately confiscated by the isle's mayor. But the player heals Underhome by cooking a Soup of Recovery and is able to brew a potion which leads them to an Oracle which had been mentioned by several characters. The Oracle implies that one has to fight against evil. When the player returns and talks to The, both agree that the people have to rise up against Lord Urizen and his helpers. The thanks the player and bids them farewell.

== Reception ==
According to Metacritic, PC Master and GameOver.gr favorably reviewed the game. PC Master speaks of an "unbelievable, beautiful, emotionally charged adventure" and "an unforgettable, dreamy journey that every adventure-gamer should experience". GameOver.gr notes the slow pacing rhythm of the game, asking the player to immerse themselves in the game to enjoy it and salutes "an excellent narrative, a beautiful art style, and wonderful music that trigger all kinds of memories of dreams we've forgotten or we never knew we had".

For Rock, Paper, Shotgun, the game emphasizes in the quality of the text and the narrative, which sometimes could overload the player.

Mash Those Buttons said that The Sea Will Claim Everything had some problems, such as its interface, but described the game as "a beautiful experience."

The Sea Will Claim Everything was nominated at the Telegraph video game awards 2012 for the Best Original Script. It has been included in the IndieGames.com's best of the year lists, at the second position for indie adventure games and twelfth in the overall top.
