= Zeno Clash 2 =

2013 video game

- Developer: ACE Team
- Publisher: Atlus
- Engine: Unreal Engine 3
- Platforms: Windows, PlayStation 3, Xbox 360
- Release: Windows; 30 April 2013; PS3; NA: 23 July 2013; PAL: 31 July 2013; Xbox 360; NA/EU: 26 July 2013; AU: 27 July 2013
- Genres: Action role-playing, beat 'em up
- Modes: Single-player, multiplayer

Zeno Clash 2 (stylized as Zeno Clash II) is a first-person action role-playing and beat 'em up video game developed by ACE Team as the follow-up to 2009's Zeno Clash. It was published by Atlus for Microsoft Windows, PlayStation 3, and Xbox 360 in 2013. The game is a direct sequel and features the same characters and setting as the first. It continues the story of Ghat, Rimat, and Father-Mother.

== Plot ==
The game begins with the first game's protagonist, Ghat, meeting with his antagonistic sister Rimat in a bar. Since the events of the last game Kax-Teh, known as the Northern Golem, has established the rule of law in the previously lawless city of Halstedom by using his power to create links between himself and all citizens of Halstedom, causing them to feel any pain he does. After law was established the Kax-Teh promptly arrested Ghat and Rimat's single parent, the creature named Father-Mother, for the crime of serial kidnapping. The two agree to work together to break Father-Mother out of prison, but upon doing so they're chased by an angry mob and forced out of Halstedom. Kax-Teh gives them a chance to have a real trial, and Ghat and Rimat decide to find all of their brothers and sisters to prepare for it. Father-Mother is forced to wait in a cave while the two gather the family.

While gathering their siblings, the two are trapped by an energy field. However, a mysterious figure gives them a device that allows them to escape, saying he will see them later. Ghat and Rimat are able to get to the beach and meet with Deadra and Henae, the latter of who was able to find her biological father Adrence, and are currently trying to set up a town of their own. They agree to give Ghat and Rimat a boat so they can travel across the sea to find Samoro-Teh, the Western Golem, and hopefully a way to kill Kax-Teh. When they get there Samoro-Teh attacks them, but the two are able to kill him, getting new tools and learning that the Golems aren't immortal like they previously thought.

Ghat, Rimat, Daedra, Henae, and Adrence agree to cross the desert and go north to find a way to break Kax-Teh's link, however Adrence betrays the group and gets Daedra and Henae captured by a local tribe in the hopes of joining them himself. Ghat and Rimat are able to kill Adrence, defeat the tribe's leader, and save their sisters, who are injured and decide to go back to their village. Ghat and Rimat keep traveling north and eventually discover a giant city in the distance. However, they are confronted by Kax-Teh, who reveals he is from that city and that law requires him to stop anyone from entering it. Frustrated, Ghat punches Kax-Teh, discovering the link between them is broken. Ghat and Rimat manage to gravely injure Kax-Teh before the link returns. Kax-Teh threatens to crush his own organs if they try to enter the city, killing everyone linked to him, so instead they decide to go see Nahuatl-Teh, the Eastern Golem, for a way to heal Kax-Teh. Along the way, they discover that Father-Mother has been abducted by an unknown group, but decide saving Kax-Teh takes priority due to his link.

When they arrive at Nahuatl-Teh's tower, the two are shocked to discover he is already dead. They are confronted by Xotl-Teh, the Southern Golem, who reveals he was the one who helped them earlier. Xotl-Teh explains that Nahuatl-Teh was dying of boredom and began to reproduce and create new life to stop this from happening. Kax-Teh, believing this to be against their laws, killed him. Xotl-Teh harvests Nahuatl-Teh's organs and says he will bring them back to Kax-Teh to keep him alive, so the two can go help Father-Mother.

Returning to Halstedom, Ghat and Rimat discover that the biological parents of all the children Father-Mother kidnapped are the ones that abducted them. Ghat and Rimat manage to defeat the mob and free Father-Mother, but Xotl-Teh confronts them and reveals that this was a test to see if Father-Mother showed any remorse for kidnapping the children. Feeling that they failed, Xotl-Teh then tries to see if Rimat will stay by Father-Mother's side knowing this, but she chooses to. Xotl-Teh then reveals he has one last test for Ghat, and asks the two to join him and Kax-Teh in the town square.

Once there, Xotl-Teh reveals that he was the one who shut off Kax-Teh's link before, as a test to see if Kax-Teh would be willing to follow the law even if he morally did not agree with it. Xotl-Teh then disables Kax-Teh's link for everyone except Ghat, and asks if Ghat would be willing to kill Kax-Teh even knowing he will die. Ghat admits he would, but wants to kill Xotl-Teh more. Ghat, Rimat, and Kax-Teh work together to fight Xotl-Teh, and after a fight, Kax-Teh shuts off the link willingly and sacrifices his life to kill Xotl-Teh. Before dying, Xotl-Teh reveals that because all four Golems are now dead, new Golems will be dispatched to watch over them, although he admits he does not know how long that will take, and it may be centuries before they are. After the fight, Rimat, Father-Mother, and most of the remaining siblings return to the clan home in Halstedom to continue living, while Ghat chooses to leave Halstedom to go help Daedra and Henae establish their new town.

== Gameplay ==
Much like the previous game, Zeno Clash 2 is a first person brawler centered around melee combat. New is the ability to individually punch with each fist, use an array of special weapons that range from a simple chain to a glove that links enemy health together, and a semi open world instead of the mission based system of the first game.

Zeno Clash 2 features a multiplayer game mode, in contrast to the first game which was only single-player. The game also includes multiple forms of Arena modes which were included in the last game, and one of these Arena modes lets you play as the Rock from Rock of Ages.

== Development ==
Zeno Clash 2 was released on 30 April 2013, four years after the original. A demo for the game was released six days before the game itself.

In June 2012 Carlos Bordeu, from ACE Team, shared details of the development. The team's involvement in Rock of Ages required the move to Unreal Engine 3 which was also chosen for Zeno Clash 2 because of larger environments, day-night cycles and visual enhancements. Open-world structure was requested by fans and the team agreed on that more focus on exploration would improve the experience and game length. The first game's melee combat dynamics was kept and improved with hit detection based on body parts. Storywise the team intended to continue where the first game ended and explain mysteries that were left unresolved, not "finishing with a cliffhanger" this time. A cooperative multiplayer mode was added to the game; Ghat's companion was designed to be more of a "partner" than a "follower". The team used its experience from Rock of Ages to improve matchmaking. The game's unusual visuals were intentionally chosen to "stand out from the mass of traditional fantasy games that continue to mimic each other". Among inspirations for the game's visuals Bordeu listed the "punk fantasy art of John Blanche" and the paintings of Hieronymus Bosch, specifically mentioning The Garden of Earthly Delights.

== Reception ==
Reception

Aggregate score
Aggregator	Score		
Aggregator	PC	PS3	Xbox 360
Metacritic	61/100	70/100	65/100

Review scores
Publication	Score		
Publication	PC	PS3	Xbox 360
4Players	50%	49%	49%
Destructoid	5.5/10	N/A	N/A
Eurogamer	5/10	N/A	N/A
GameSpot	5.5/10	N/A	N/A
GameTrailers	7.5/10	N/A	N/A
GameZone	3.5/10	N/A	N/A
Hardcore Gamer	2/5	N/A	N/A
IGN	6.4/10	N/A	N/A
Official Xbox Magazine (US)	N/A	N/A	6.5/10
PC Gamer (UK)	67%	N/A	N/A
PCGamesN	6/10	N/A	N/A
Polygon	6/10	N/A	N/A
The Escapist	3.5/5	N/A	N/A

The game received "mixed or average reviews" on all platforms according to the review aggregation website Metacritic. Critics praised the artwork and characters but cited various flaws, and most seemed to agree that the game fell behind in comparison to the first game. Destructoid said, "Zeno Clash II might be bigger than its predecessor, but it fails to be truly better."

== Legacy ==
Clash: Artifacts of Chaos, a new installment in the Zeno Clash series, was announced at the Nacon Connect online press conference in July 2021 and was released on 9 March 2023.
