= Jonas Kyratzes =

German-Greek video game designer

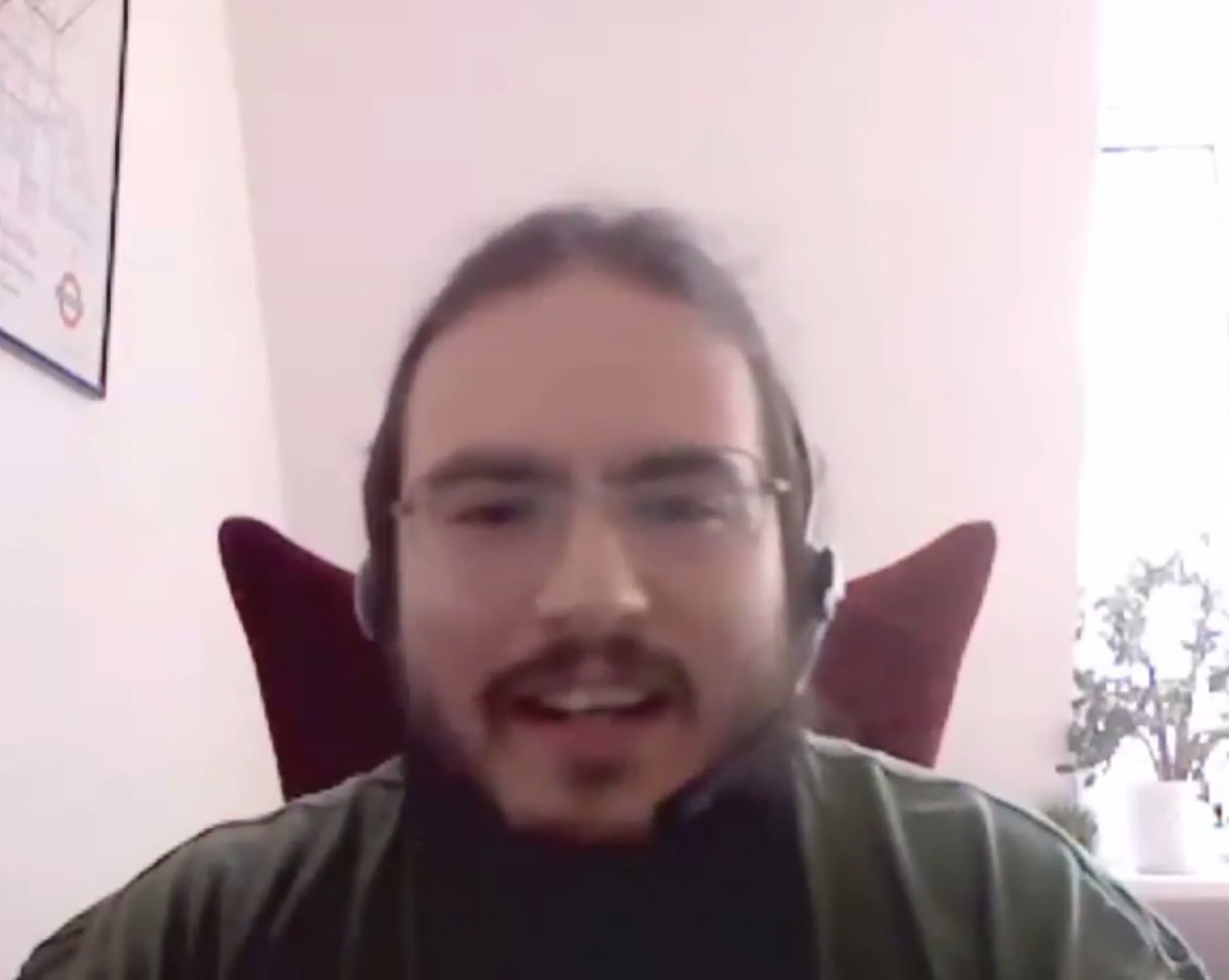
- Kyratzes in 2011
- Born: 21 May 1984 (age 41); Wiesbaden, West Germany (now Germany)
- Occupations: Video game designer, writer
- Known for: Last Rose in a Desert Garden (2000), The Museum of Broken Memories (2006), The Strange and Somewhat Sinister Tale of the House at Desert Bridge (2008)
- Partner: Verena Kyratzes
- Website: jonas-kyratzes.net

Jonas Kyratzes is a German-Greek video game designer and author of video game industry related articles.

== Career ==
Kyratzes' games are known for breaking with convention and being heavily story-driven. Several of his games are thematically interconnected, often by the recurring figure of Urizen (first mentioned in The Great Machine) and other themes related to or inspired by the work of William Blake. With his wife, he created The Lands of Dream, a setting for many games, a book, and stories (see Stories below) he and his wife created.

He also has an interest in film, and in January 2009 he wrote and directed a short documentary about the 2008 Greek riots called The Greek Riots: Some Basic Facts.

Jonas was born in Germany to a Greek father and a German mother, and raised in Greece. He has written several articles on video games, often advocating the concept that games are an art form. He is also politically active on the internet, blogging about political issues and co-founding the Wikileaks Stories game-making initiative. He describes his political stance as left-wing.

He lives in Frankfurt, (Germany) with his wife, Verena.

== Games ==
- Last Rose in a Desert Garden (2000): Fatalistic but very short, which takes place in the aftermath of a nuclear war.
- The Infinite Ocean (2003, 2010 remake), deals with the concept of existentialism, centered on a sentient computer.
- The Great Machine: A Fragment, an experimental work of interactive fiction about the horrors of war.
- The Museum of Broken Memories (2006), which also deals with themes relating to war, but is made up of a number of interrelated story fragments.
- The Strange and Somewhat Sinister Tale of the House at Desert Bridge (2009), a humorous fantasy with melancholic undertones, set in the Lands of Dream.
- Phenomenon 32, a post-apocalyptic 2D exploration platformer set in an alternate universe.
- You Shall Know The Truth, a political game about WikiLeaks
- Alphaland (2011), a platformer set inside an unfinished (alpha) game. Terry Cavanagh is credited as a programmer.
- The Book of Living Magic (2011), another game set in the Lands of Dream, in which a girl named Raven Locks Smith leaves the town of Dull to find The Book of Living Magic.
- Arcadia: A Pastoral Tale (2012), another work of interactive fiction (a text-based game).
- The Fabulous Screech (2012), a Lands of Dream installment expanding on the feline character it is named for, whom was first introduced in The Book of Living Magic.
- Traitor (2012), Kyratzes' most mechanic-based game, a vertical shooter about a mercenary's role in a growing revolutionary conflict.
- The Sea Will Claim Everything (2012), his first commercial game, involving another Lands of Dream scenario where a biotechnological dwelling called Underhome must face foreclosure.
- Moonlight (2012), a surreal text-based game that contains Stephen Fry, Oscar Wilde, Alpha Centauri, eagles, and many more things.
- The Matter of the Great Red Dragon (2014), a text-based Lands of Dream game
- The Talos Principle (2014), hired as a writer by Croteam
- A Postcard From Afthonia (2014), his latest Lands of Dream game, in which the player helps out a cat and a dog, who are married, during a war.
- Serious Sam VR: The Last Hope (2017)
- Phoenix Point (2018), developing the narrative and stories for Snapshot Games.
- Serious Sam 4 (2020)
- The Eternal Cylinder (2021)
- Clash: Artifacts of Chaos (2023)
- The Talos Principle II (2023)

== Book ==
- Στη σκιά του Αόρατου Βασιλιά (In the Shadow of the Invisible King), (2013) is currently only available in Greek. It takes place in the Lands of Dream.

== Stories ==
Jonas has "collected" many stories that take place in the Lands of Dream. They are all illustrated by his wife, Verena. The stories are found in The Oneiropolis Compendium, the Wanderers' Tales (stories written by other authors that "traveled" to the Lands of Dream), and Likely Facts, excerpts from The Book of Likely Facts (only published in the Lands of Dream), which was written by "Jorrum Dooga."

== Podcasts ==
- "Gospels of the Flood", a short 7 episode podcast that tells the story of a priest who is trying to regain their faith as the world is consumed by a flood.
- "Azathoth Blues", 10 episode cosmic horror audio drama.

== Future projects ==
- Super Omega Land, another platforming game
- Ithaka of the Clouds, a Lands of Dream text-based game. This game was originally crowdfunded, but Jonas decided to rename it The Council of Crows. Ithaka of the Clouds became a very different (and less expensive) game than Jonas had originally planned.
