= Zoria: Age of Shattering =

2024 video game

- Developer(s): Tiny Trinket Games
- Publisher(s): Anshar Publishing; Surefire Games
- Engine: Unity
- Platform(s): Windows, Linux
- Release: March 7, 2024
- Genre(s): Role-playing
- Mode(s): Single-player

Zoria: Age of Shattering is a 2024 role-playing video game developed by Tiny Trinket Games and published by Anshar Publishing and Surefire Games for the Windows and Linux.

== Gameplay ==
The setting of the game is the fantasy world of Zoria, where the nation of Iziria has launched an invasion of the kingdom of Elion. The player assumes the role of Captain Witherel, a member of Elion's military forces. There are nine different character classes to select from in the game. Additionally, the player can recruit from a pool of over 50 companions, with the option to have up to four of them accompany Captain Witherel in a party simultaneously. The combat is turn-based.

== Release ==
Zoria was developed by Tiny Trinket Games, a team of three people based in Bucharest, Romania. The game had a successful Kickstarter campaign in 2022. It was originally intended to be released in early access in April 2023 but developers decided to forego it. In August 2023, the game was set to be released in Q4 2023. It was eventually released on March 7, 2024. In May 2024, an update was released that added two classes to the game: Bard and Necromancer.

== Reception ==
=== Pre-release ===
PC Guru thought the demo version was enjoyable and liked the lore but had some issues with combat and the emptiness of the world. In a 2023 PAX West preview, RPGamer liked the combat and said the game feels fun but needs some polish. In a preview close to the release, RPGamer wrote: "Tiny Trinket Games looks to have done a good job putting its own imprint onto cRPGs with Zoria: Age of Shattering." Rock Paper Shotgun had some issues with the user interface and graphical presentation but said it was "an impressive feat" for a small development team.

=== Post-release ===
Rock Paper Shotgun called the game interesting and well made, although they noted that certain aspects may be overly ambitious. RPGFan summarized the game as "an engaging tactical RPG with a few drawbacks involving its presentation and graphics".
