= Rock of Ages 3: Make & Break =

2020 video game

- Developers: ACE Team; Giant Monkey Robot
- Publisher: Modus Games
- Producers: Andrés Bordeu; Carlos Bordeu
- Designers: Andrés Bordeu; Carlos Bordeu
- Programmer: Leo Benaducci
- Artists: Walter Berendsen; Daniel Felipe Ramirez
- Composer: Patricio Meneses
- Engine: Unreal Engine 4
- Platforms: Nintendo Switch; PlayStation 4 Windows; Xbox One; Google Stadia
- Release: NS, PS4, Windows, Xbox One; July 21, 2020; Stadia; August 14, 2020
- Genres: Tower defense, racing, sandbox
- Modes: Single-player, multiplayer

Rock of Ages 3: Make & Break is a tower defense racing video game developed by ACE Team and published by Modus Games. The game is the sequel to the 2011 Rock of Ages and the 2017 Rock of Ages 2: Bigger & Boulder. It was released on July 21, 2020, for Nintendo Switch, PlayStation 4, Windows, and Xbox One; and on August 14, 2020, for Google Stadia.

== Gameplay ==
Players build boulders and roll them into enemy gates as fast as they can. Once they break through they want to squish everything. This seemingly simple task is made more difficult because both sides pepper each other's lanes with traps, obstacles, and defenses. Unlike the first two games in the series, the game lets players make different courses which are conquered during competition.

== Development ==
On August 15, 2019, a sequel to Rock of Ages was announced by ACE Team. Instead of Atlus, the company partnered with Giant Monkey Robot and Modus Games; they released the title in 2020.

== Reception ==
Reception

Aggregate scores
Aggregator	Score
Metacritic	(PC) 72/100 (PS4) 65/100 (XONE) 74/100 (NS) 64/100
OpenCritic	49% recommend

Review scores
Publication	Score
GameSpot	7/10
Hardcore Gamer	3.5/5
Nintendo Life	4/10
Nintendo World Report	6.5/10
Push Square	6/10

According to review aggregator website Metacritic, the game received "mixed or average reviews" from critics. Fellow review aggregator OpenCritic assessed that the game received fair approval, being recommended by 49% of critics.

GameSpot praised the game's course editor, trials, traversal, story, and tone while criticizing its frustrating gameplay, easy challenges, incomprehensible AI, and unfair casualty rate. Nintendo Life lauded the game's visual style, energetic cutscenes, soundtrack, and performance; they saw the subpar graphics and illegible UI text as negatives.

Push Square deemed the gameplay, multiplayer, and story mode to be fun finding that the course editor, presentation, and community level menu needing to be improved.
