= Chaos Reborn =

2015 video game

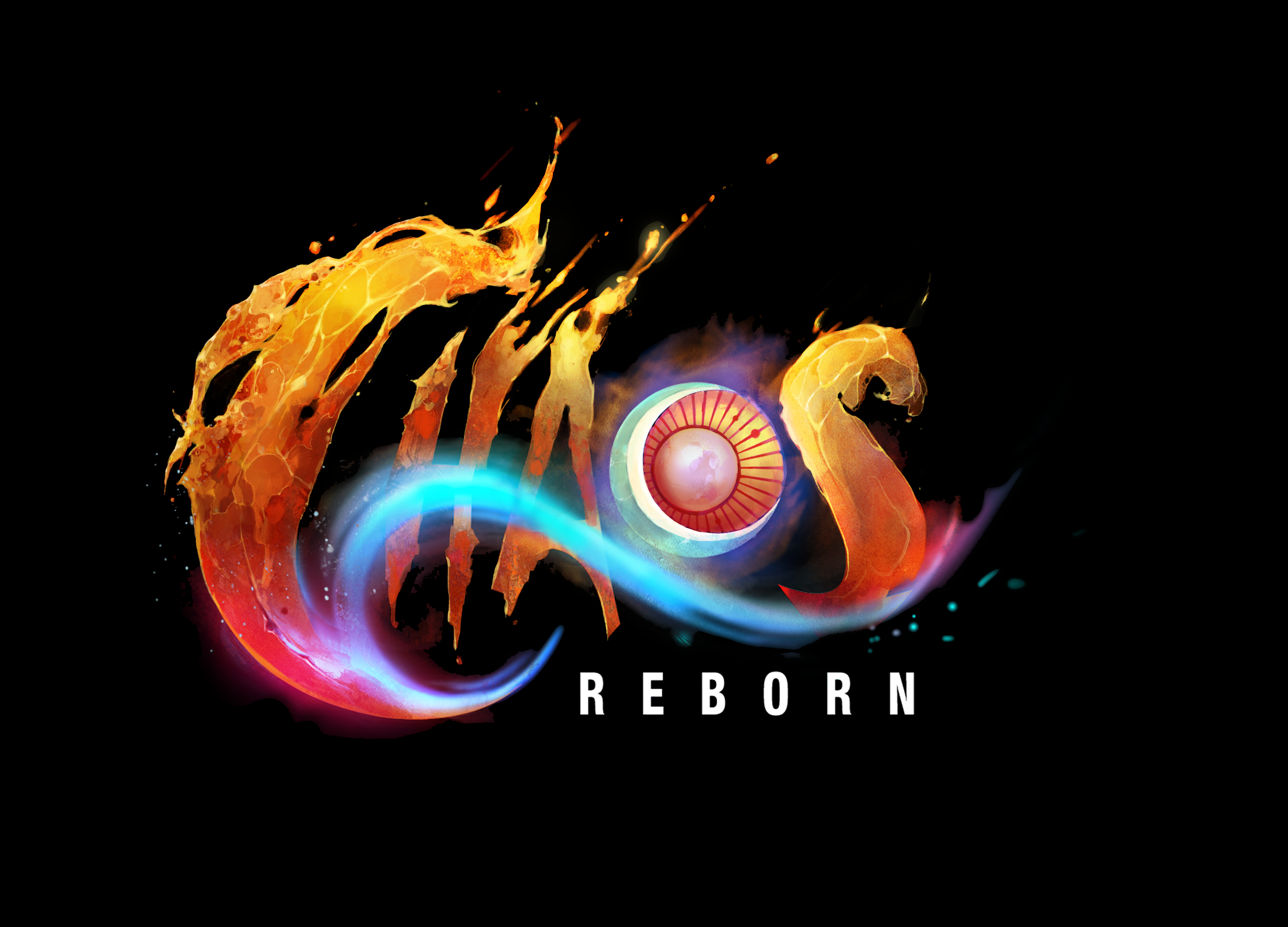
- Developer: Snapshot Games
- Publisher: Snapshot Games
- Director: Julian Gollop
- Producer: Dimitar Dimitrov
- Designer: Julian Gollop
- Programmer: Stoiko Todorov
- Artist: Svetoslav Petrov
- Writers: Allen Stroud; Julian Gollop
- Composer: George Strezov
- Engine: Unity
- Platforms: Microsoft Windows, Linux, OS X
- Release: October 26, 2015
- Genre: Tactical role-playing
- Modes: Single-player, multiplayer

Chaos Reborn is a turn-based tactical role-playing game developed by Snapshot Games and was part funded through a Kickstarter crowdfunding campaign. Following an early access release in December 2014, the full game was released in October 2015.

The game is a remake of Gollop's 1985 game Chaos: The Battle of Wizards. The remake includes a number of improvements over the original version including a role-playing meta game and the ability to buy equipment such as armour, staves, and talismans which give players a number of enhancements, such as extra spells and abilities.

== Gameplay ==
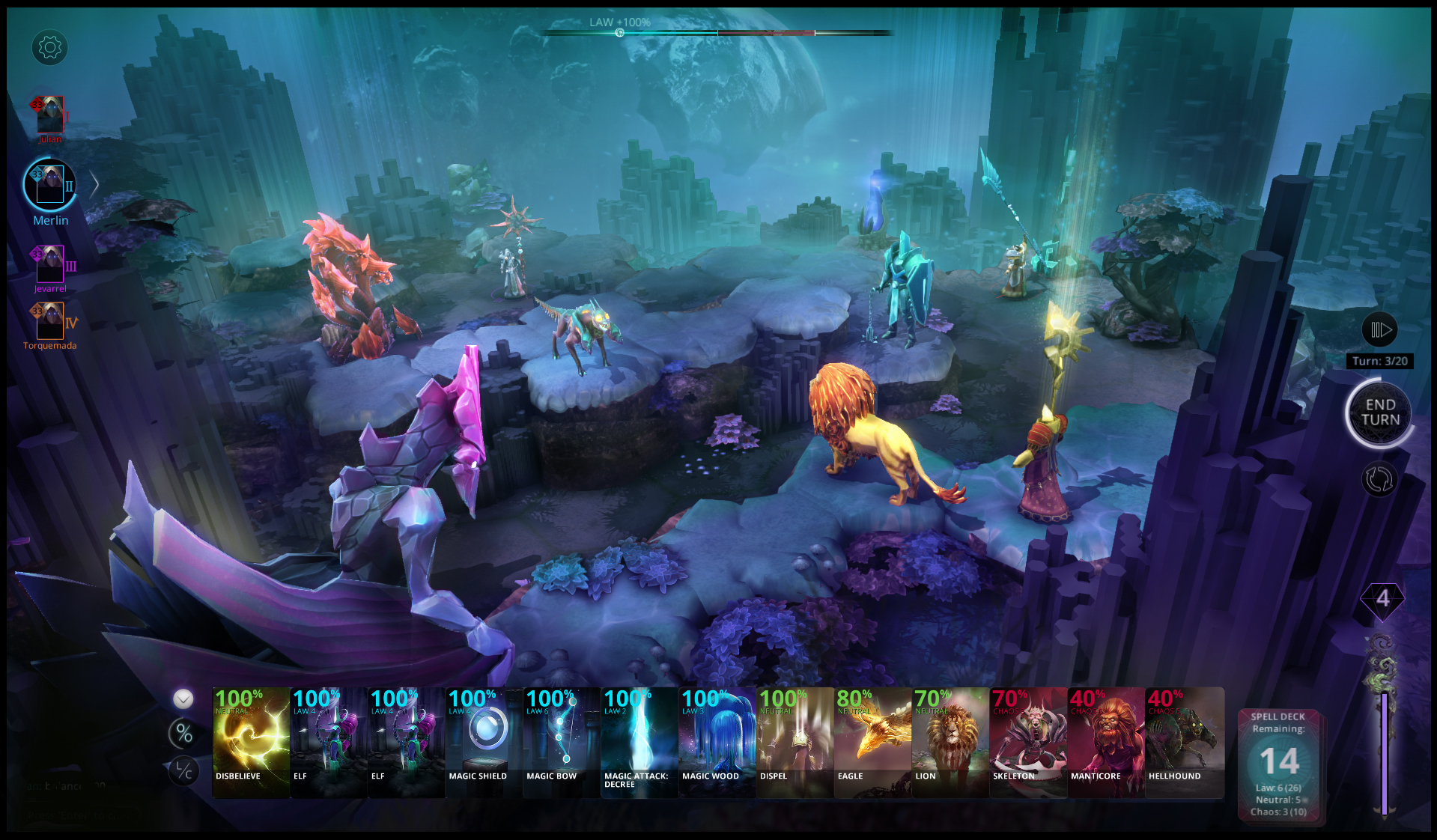
A Chaos Reborn multiplayer battle

The game features online and offline single player and multiplayer modes in the form of both player versus player and player versus environment experiences.

Players take turns to manipulate units on a battle map with the objective of eliminating their rivals' most important unit, the wizard. If a player loses their wizard, they lose the match and all of their units are removed from the battle map. By casting spells the wizard can create new units, equip themselves with weapons, or directly attack another unit.

The single-player campaign and Realm Quest mode are a narrative game world map overlay linking together a series of battles culminating in a boss battle with the player(s) pitted against a wizard king unit and a wizard unit. The mode introduces both strategy game and role-playing game elements such as capturing infrastructure, sending units to a target, hiring mercenary units to accompany the wizard unit, and resolving story driven elements.

Each match can involve the player controlling a number of creature units based upon mythical and real-life animals and supernatural beings. The player may start with these creature units by using mercenaries or villagers, or add creature units per turn by casting a spell to summon them. Many of these creature units also have abilities to distinguish them from others in a more tangible way than merely by differing values such as attack rating.

=== Duel Mode and Forge Crystals expansion ===
In July 2016, Snapshot Games released version 1.10 adding the new features Duel Mode and Forge Crystals. The Duel Mode of play created a single one-button click method of starting a battle against either a human or AI opponent, depending upon which was available. Winning unbroken Duels resulted in the player receiving escalating rewards in the form of Gold and Forge Crystals plus, once per day, a Talisman. The Forge Crystals could then be spent in the now unlocked to all players Equipment Forge allowing many for the first time to personalise their game character's appearance and create custom Bodygear and Staffs.

=== Chaos Reborn: Adventures ===
Mobile game developer Big Blue Bubble released a mobile port of Chaos Reborn entitled Chaos Reborn: Adventures in September 2018. The game was praised by critics, receiving a gold rating by Pocket Gamer and a 5 star rating by Pocket Tactics.

== Reception ==
Reception

Aggregate score
Aggregator	Score
Metacritic	PC: 85/100

Review score
Publication	Score
PC Gamer (US)	87/100

The game was well received, and was given a score of 85/100 on review aggregation website Metacritic. PC Gamer awarded it a score of 87% and called it the return of one of the gaming's oldest tactical classics. It was subsequently nominated for a Golden Joystick Award in the 2015 Best Indie Game category, losing out to Kerbal Space Program.
