= The Eternal Cylinder =

2021 video game

- Developer: ACE Team
- Publisher: Good Shepherd Entertainment
- Director: Carlos Bordeu
- Writer: Jonas Kyratzes
- Composer: Patricio Meneses
- Engine: Unreal Engine 4
- Platforms: Microsoft Windows; PlayStation 4 Xbox One; PlayStation 5 Xbox Series X/S
- Release: Windows, PS4, Xbox One; September 30, 2021; PS5, Xbox Series X/S; October 13, 2022
- Genre: Survival
- Mode: Single-player

The Eternal Cylinder is an adventure-survival video game developed by ACE Team and published by Good Shepherd Entertainment. It was released in September 2021 for Microsoft Windows, PlayStation 4, and Xbox One, and was released for PlayStation 5 and Xbox Series X/S in October 2022.

== Gameplay ==
The game is a third-person open world adventure game that puts the player in control of a small creature called a Trebhum. In its most basic form, the Trebhum is able to gather items with its trunk, run, jump, and roll to move faster, as well as spray water from its trunk or eject items from its inventory.

As the game progresses, the Trebhum gains access to a collection of various mutations, which are triggered by various items that can be gathered from the environment. The mutations are classified according to body part, with the five classes being eye, leg, trunk, body and skin mutations, with all mutations of each part being mutually exclusive (save for the Third Eye mutation that overlaps with other eye mutations). As such, a Trebhum can have a maximum of six mutations each, with new mutations overwriting previous ones of the same body part. Trebhum can recruit new members by finding them in the overworld, hatching them from eggs, or recruiting them from Trebhum houses. A party of Trebhum can have different mutations with different abilities, with the number of maximum Trebhum being able to be upgraded at special Trebhum shrines, at the cost of "crystal dust" a form of currency that can be either found in dust form, or be processed from minerals by Trebhum with the Mineral Processor mutation.

Mutations grant the Trebhum a diverse array of capabilities, with leg mutations enabling them to jump higher, run faster or perform attacking stomps, eye mutations allowing them to extend their eyes to see further, find hidden objects or scan enemy creatures to unlock entries on their compendium, trunk mutations allowing them to shoot fire, spray acid or create small tornadoes, skin mutations giving them bioluminescence, spikes to deter predators or produce a malodorous scent, and most significantly, body mutations that allow them to process water from food items, process mineral currency from minerals, and create bombs from their inventories. These mutations require a catalyst and can be removed by some enemies equipped with a yellow light that de-mutates the Trebhum: however, once the mutation tree is unlocked, the Trebhum can access the mutations at will and are no longer affected by the enemies' yellow light.

While the overall game is generally open-world, the linear progression is enforced by the advancement of the Eternal Cylinder itself. Rows of towers dot the landscape, blocking the Cylinder from moving and projecting a force field that the Trebhum can safely explore. However, once the Trebhum step out of the field, the Cylinder resumes its progression, and gradually accelerates, forcing the player to race to the next set of towers to activate them. If the Cylinder catches up to the players, or if they fail to activate the towers, it results in a game over.

Throughout the Trebhum's journey, the events, dialogue and story progression are commentated on by a mysterious Narrator, who not only explains the events to the audience but also acts as a guiding voice within the Trebhum's minds. The Narrator can give helpful tips on finding certain items, utilizing new mutations, or defeating special enemies that are encountered in the game.

== Plot ==
In the path of the Eternal Cylinder, a lone Trebhum hatches and barely avoids being crushed. After encountering a deceased elder of its kind, the Trebhum activates a nearby set of towers that temporarily halt the advance of the Cylinder. Assembling a small tribe, the Trebhum then find a living elder, who informs them of their race's path and offers encouragement heading forward. They later encounter a second elder, who suggests a plan for escape: going overtop of the cylinder and searching the land behind for a new home. Reaching the edge of a frozen tundra, the Trebhum manage to scale and traverse the cylinder, only to find a lifeless wasteland behind it. The exposed trebhum are soon captured by the Cylinder's greatest servant, the Mathematician, and are transported to the Cylinder's mind, where a voice tries to talk to them. Unable to comprehend the voice or their surroundings, the Trebhum manage to discover an exit and escape from the Cylinder's mindscape.

Back in the physical world, the Trebhum find that the Cylinder has progressed further, and are now deep in the tundra. Evading new lifeforms and more aggressive servants, while finding additional elders, the Trebhum eventually formulate a new plan to escape their world using a flying palace their people built long ago. In the course of reaching such a palace in a desert, the Trebhum venture into the mind of the Cylinder once more, and finally commune with the voice, which reveals itself as that of a human - long ago, the Cylinder arrived on Earth and consumed everything on the planet, before turning its attention to the Trebhum's world upon hearing their songs. The Trebhum eventually manage to activate the palace, but the sudden intervention of the Mathematician results in the palace floating out of reach. Venturing into the Cylinder's mind a third time sees the Cylinder finally speak and reveal its goals: believing difference to be the source of all suffering, the Cylinder seeks to absorb all existence into itself to create a peaceful universe. Upon exiting the mind scape, the Trebhum find that their scuffle with the Mathematician has released entities stored within the Cylinder into their world, creating a toxic new landscape filled with unknown threats.

Evading both extremely dangerous wildlife and direct attacks by the most dangerous of the Cylinder's servants, the Trebhum encounter a final elder, who reveals that their kind were once companions of the Celestial Trewhaala, enormous eel-like aliens who have guarded the elder shrines the Trebhum previously visited. After acquiring a mutation that allows them to commune with the Trewhaala, the two races reach an agreement - the Trewhaala will ferry the Trebhum to the palace as long as the Trebhum first consume Cylinder artifacts that carry traits of the Trewhaala, who are dying out and hope to use these artifacts to survive within the Trebhum's genetic memory. Despite desperate attacks by the Cylinder, the Trebhum succeed in acquiring all of these artifacts and are ferried to the palace. Determined not to let the Trebhum escape, the Cylinder sends a fully restored Mathematician to kill them, only for a trio of Trewhaala to intervene. The four clash atop the palace while the Trebhum move to avoid the crossfire, until finally the Mathematician is defeated.

Entering the Cylinder's mind a final time, the Trebhum are thanked by the Narrator for defeating the Cylinder, in the process revealing that the Narrator is the mind controlling the Mathematician. The Mathematician promptly turns on the Cylinder and sacrifices itself to destroy the construct, finally ending the Mathematician's hunt. As the Trebhum celebrate their victory, the Narrator recaps their story, and as he fades away, admits to being unsure if the Cylinder will return, but feels content with his role in the story of its ending.

== Development ==
On August 15, 2019, while a third sequel to Rock of Ages was announced by Modus Games, instead of Altus, in collab with Giant Monkey Robot and would be released in 2020, another game, based on another prototype in 2015 titled The Endless Cylinder by ACE Team co-founder Carlos Bordeu, was announced from Good Shepherd Entertainment which sets in a survival genre later on. The game was eventually released for Microsoft Windows via Epic Games Store, PlayStation 4, and Xbox One on September 30, 2021. The game was released for Steam, PlayStation 5 and Xbox Series X/S on October 13, 2022.

== Reception ==
Reception

Aggregate score
Aggregator	Score
Metacritic	(PC) 79/100 (PS4) 80/100 (XONE) 82/100

Review scores
Publication	Score
Destructoid	9/10
Hardcore Gamer	4/5
PC Gamer (US)	70/100

The Eternal Cylinder received "generally favorable" reviews, according to review aggregator Metacritic.

PC Gamer praised the game's landscapes and enchanted reprieves, but criticized its dull mutations, basic structure, and unwieldy micromanagement systems.
