= The Deadly Tower of Monsters =

2016 video game

- Promotional poster featuring Scarlet Nova
- Developer: ACE Team
- Publisher: Atlus USA
- Engine: Unreal Engine 3
- Platforms: Windows; PlayStation 4
- Release: 19 January 2016
- Genre: Action-adventure
- Modes: Single-player, multiplayer (PC)

The Deadly Tower of Monsters is an action-adventure game developed by ACE Team and published by Atlus USA for Microsoft Windows and PlayStation 4 in January 2016. The game is a metafictional parody of science fiction midnight B movie from its golden age, with caricatural superheroes.

== Gameplay ==
The Deadly Tower of Monsters mixes beat 'em up and twin-stick shooter elements, with a fixed camera system seen from a top-down perspective. The main focus during player's gameplay is one long, continuous climb up the outside of the titular tower. A jetpack can be used to reach high areas.

There is also a 4-player cooperative and hard mode, released on 14 March 2016, and survival mode, released on 4 October the same year – both exclusively to Windows version.

== Plot ==
The Deadly Tower of Monsters follows three actors in the in-game space opera movie of the same name: Jonathan Digby who stars as Dick Starspeed – an astronaut hero who crash-lands his spaceship on the outlandish planet Gravoria, ruled by a tyrannical Emperor; Stacy Sharp as Scarlet Nova – daughter of the planet's evil Emperor; and The Robot as Robot – a co-pilot and Starspeed's trusty sidekick.

The game's frame story is that of an early 1970s B movie The Deadly Tower of Monsters recently released on DVD, with the director's commentary of its in-universe director Dan Smith, serving as a combination of tutorial and meta-commentary on the game, providing an explanation as to why many default elements of shooters would be in what is ostensibly a film (the player being required to break boxes to obtain items, for example, is taken as the lead actor ad-libbing on Smith's advice to make sure every moment was somewhat exciting).

== Development ==
The Deadly Tower of Monsters was announced on 12 June 2015. According to Carlos Bordeu, one of the ACE Team founders, it was initially planned as a dungeon crawler set in a vertical labyrinth, with the "more generic fantasy". Game's concept was changed because the team "wanted to do something that was completely different", as he stated. The inspiration came from the 1950s and 1960s science fiction films, including the Godzilla franchise, Forbidden Planet, and Plan 9 from Outer Space; as well as TV series Flash Gordon and Lost in Space from the same era. Scarlet Nova character was modeled after Jane Fonda's heroine Barbarella, from the 1968 film of the same name. Dan Smith's exaggerated personality, on the other hand, was partly based on the Mystery Science Theater 3000 – a science fiction comedy series created by Joel Hodgson, which ACE Team loved; and Ed Wood, an American cult filmmaker. Some enemies were animated by using the stop motion and rotoscoping technique.

The Deadly Tower of Monsters trailer was published on 2 December 2015, followed by the game's release on 19 January 2016.

== Reception ==
Reception

Aggregate score
Aggregator	Score	
Aggregator	PC	PS4
Metacritic	73/100	72/100

Review scores
Publication	Score	
Publication	PC	PS4
4Players	74%	73%
Destructoid	8/10	N/A
GameSpot	N/A	6/10
Hardcore Gamer	4/5	N/A
PC Games (DE)	71%	N/A
VentureBeat	N/A	63/100
Metro	N/A	5/10

The Deadly Tower of Monsters received "mixed or average reviews" on both platforms according to the review aggregation website Metacritic. Destructoid said, "The Deadly Tower of Monsters is a fleeting experience, but one that no B-movie fan should go without." PlayStation LifeStyle said, "Just like the movies it tries to emulate, the game is so bad with its special effects, dialogue, and set-pieces that it's rather good." Hardcore Gamer said, "Minor issues aside, The Deadly Tower of Monsters is a pleasant surprise indeed and a particularly impressive budget action game showcasing a lot of creativity."
