= ACE Team =

Сhilean video game developer

ACE Team Software S.A.
- Company type: Private
- Industry: Video games
- Founded: 1998/1999; 27 years ago
- Founders: Andres Bordeu; Carlos Bordeu; Edmundo Bordeu
- Headquarters: Santiago, Chile
- Key people: Andres Bordeu; Carlos Bordeu; Edmundo Bordeu
- Products: Zeno Clash series; Rock of Ages series; The Deadly Tower of Monsters
- Website: aceteam.cl

ACE Team Software S.A. is a Chilean video game developer based in Santiago. Founded in the late 1990s by brothers Andres, Carlos and Edmundo Bordeu, the company started out by developing total conversions before turning to commercial game development. All operations were halted between 2003 and 2007 while Andres and Carlos were employed by Wanako Games.

== History ==
ACE Team was founded by brothers Andres, Carlos and Edmundo Bordeu in either 1998 or 1999. The studio name was formed from the initials of the three founders. Initially, ACE Team developed total conversions of older games, starting with Batman Doom for Doom II: Hell on Earth. Other total conversions included ZanZan for Doom II and The Dark Conjunction for Quake III Arena. For the latter, ACE Team hired a programmer, Juan Pablo Lastra. Following these releases, a scouting agency contacted ACE Team, asking whether they would consider developing commercial games, to which ACE Team agreed. The studio got a hold of LithTech Jupiter, the game engine also used in No One Lives Forever 2, and began developing a game titled Zenozoik: Shattered Land in 2002. However, the game proved too ambitious due to the team's insufficient size and experience.

By 2003, all development on Zenozoik was halted as Andres and Carlos were hired by local game developer Wanako Games. During their time at Wanako Games, they met their soon-to-be company partner, David Caloguerea, and contributed to several of the studio's games, including Assault Heroes. However, most games developed at Wanako Games were casual games, so in 2007, Andres, Carlos and Caloguerea left Wanako Games to re-instantiate ACE Team. Development on Zenozoik continued and was moved over to the id Tech 4 engine, then to Source. By recommendation from Valve, the developers of Source, Zenozoik was retitled Zeno Clash. The original Zenozoik prototype was scrapped and never released, with Zeno Clash was handled as a spiritual successor to that prototype. Leading up to the release of Zeno Clash, ACE Team released the browser game The Malstrums Mansion on April Fools' Day, 2009. Zeno Clash was first released on 21 April 2009, self-published by ACE Team for Microsoft Windows. A sequel, Zeno Clash 2, was announced shortly thereafter.

Retail releases of Zeno Clash came by hand of publishers Tripwire Interactive and Iceberg Interactive in February 2010 and March 2010, respectively. ACE Team co-operated with publisher Atlus USA to release an Xbox 360 port of the game with additional features, titled Zeno Clash: Ultimate Edition, in 2010. ACE Team continued working with Atlus USA for their next game; originally referred to internally as Boulder, Atlus USA christened that game Rock of Ages and released it 2011.

== Games developed ==
Year	Title	Platform(s)								Publisher(s)
Year	Title	Win	NS	PS3	PS4	PS5	X360	XONE	XSX/S	Publisher(s)
2009	Zeno Clash	Yes	No	No	No	No	Yes	No	No	ACE Team, Tripwire Interactive, Iceberg Interactive, Atlus USA
2011	Rock of Ages	Yes	No	Yes	No	No	Yes	No	No	Atlus USA
2013	Zeno Clash 2	Yes	No	Yes	No	No	Yes	No	No	Atlus USA
2014	Abyss Odyssey	Yes	No	Yes	Yes	No	Yes	No	No	Atlus USA
2016	The Deadly Tower of Monsters	Yes	No	No	Yes	No	No	No	No	Atlus USA
2017	Rock of Ages 2: Bigger & Boulder	Yes	Yes	No	Yes	No	No	Yes	No	Atlus USA, Sega
2019	SolSeraph	Yes	Yes	No	Yes	No	No	Yes	No	Sega
2020	Rock of Ages 3: Make & Break	Yes	Yes	No	Yes	No	No	Yes	No	Modus Games
2021	The Eternal Cylinder	Yes	No	No	Yes	Yes	No	Yes	Yes	Good Shepherd Entertainment
2023	Clash: Artifacts of Chaos	Yes	No	No	Yes	Yes	No	Yes	Yes	Nacon
2026	The Mound: Omen of Cthulhu	Yes	No	No	No	Yes	No	No	Yes	Nacon
