= Rock of Ages (video game) =

2011 video game

- Xbox 360 digital cover
- Developer: ACE Team
- Publisher: Atlus USA
- Engine: Unreal Engine 3
- Platforms: Microsoft Windows, PlayStation 3, Xbox 360
- Release: Xbox 360; 31 August 2011; Windows; 7 September 2011; PlayStation 3: NA: 15 May 2012; PAL: 1 August 2012
- Genres: Tower defense, racing
- Modes: Single-player, multiplayer

Rock of Ages is a tower defense racing video game developed by ACE Team and published by Atlus USA. It uses the Unreal Engine 3. The game was released for Xbox 360 in August 2011, for Microsoft Windows in September 2011, and for PlayStation 3 in 2012.

== Gameplay ==
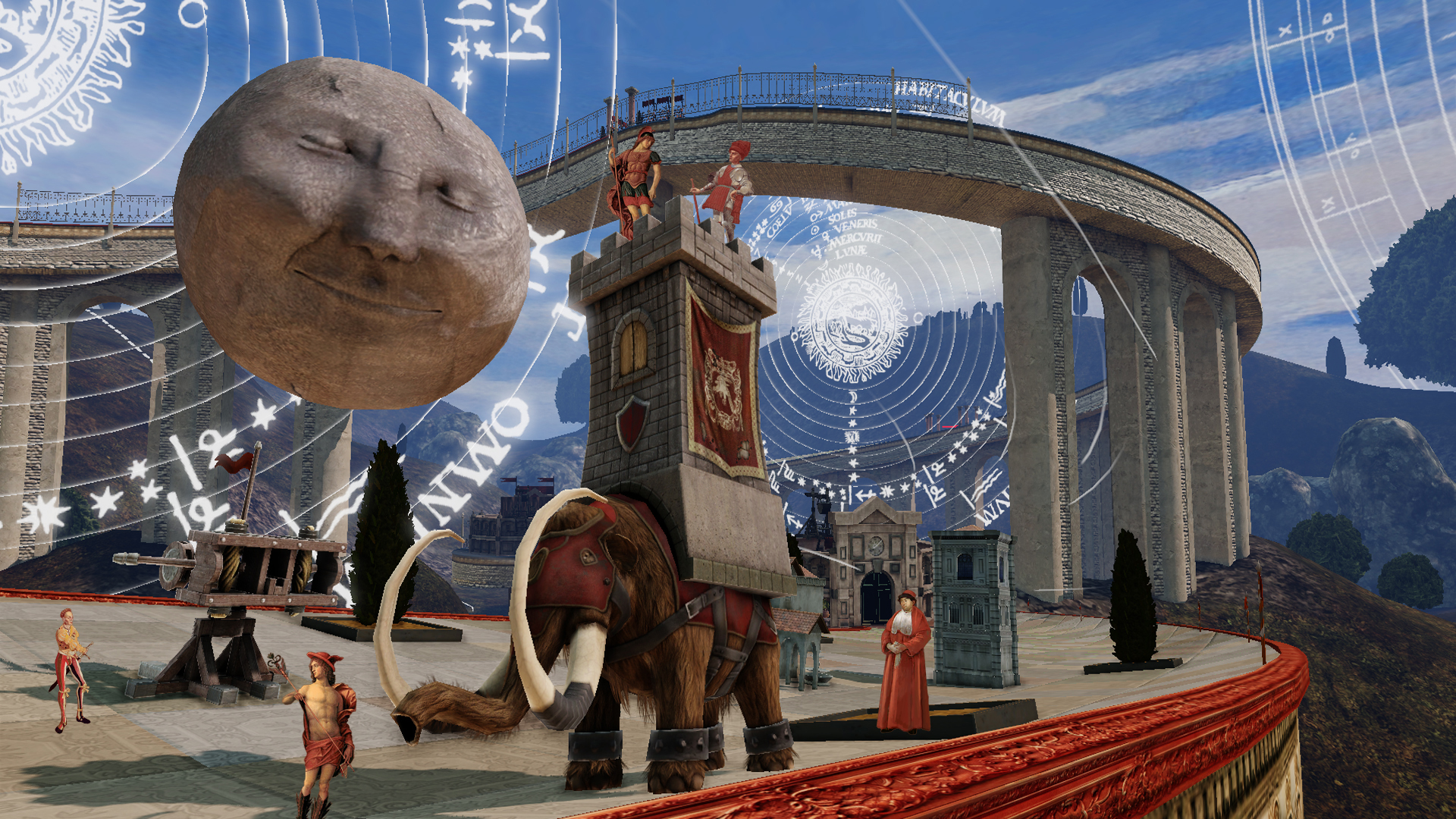
Screenshot taken from Rock of Ages' Renaissance-themed setting

The game combines tower defense strategy with a rolling ball mechanic similar to games such as Marble Madness and Super Monkey Ball. Players must use a large stone boulder to attack an enemy's castle at the bottom of the hill, while using various defensive structures to defend their own castles. Players can use a variety of obstacles to defend the path leading up to the castle, such as buildings, dynamite, windmills and animals. Players can also plant money farms in order to raise the funds needed to use certain objects. The player can only add obstacles on green colored landscapes, which turn unusable when obstacles or money farms are planted on top of them. When ready to attack, the player can take control of a boulder and roll it down the hill, avoiding obstacles in order to attack the enemy castle's gate. If players have enough points, they can equip their boulders with power-ups, such as armor or magma, which enhance a boulder's defensive or offensive capabilities, though they will lose this power up if the boulder takes sufficient damage. Once the boulder hits the gate, or their boulder breaks after taking too much damage, there is a small recharge period before another boulder can be launched. The player wins if they can break through the castle gates and place his boulder in the center of the castle, killing the opponent.

The game includes a story mode, which is loosely based on the myth of Sisyphus and features various stages, boss levels, and several multiplayer modes. "War" features two players attempting to break each other's castle gates, whilst "Skee Boulder" requires players to race down a lane hitting targets before landing in a skeeball-style board while attempting to land their boulder in the target with the largest score multiplier.

Rock of Ages features a chronology which spans across five time periods: Ancient Greek, Medieval, Renaissance, Rococo and Romanticism. Each time period features a unique, Pythonesque art style during gameplay. The team narrowed their selection to these five periods from a larger pool of 16 time periods which included Neoclassic, Prehistoric, and Impressionism.

== Pebble of Time ==
As a prank for April Fool's Day 2011, ACE Team created a page for a fake independent developer in which the developer claimed in broken English that he had been working on an indie title called Pebble of Time for the past eight years, and that ACE Team had stolen his concept. The developer claimed he was releasing his title for free to undercut support for Rock of Ages, and provided download links for his working prototype. Edmundo Bordeu later updated the site to reflect that it was indeed an April Fool's joke.

== Reception ==
Reception

Aggregate score
Aggregator	Score
Metacritic	(PC) 74/100 (X360) 72/100 (PS3) 68/100

Review scores
Publication	Score
Destructoid	(X360) 8.5/10
Edge	(X360) 7/10
Eurogamer	(X360) 6/10
Game Informer	(X360) 7/10
GamePro	(X360) 4.5/5
GameSpot	(X360) 6/10
GameSpy	(PC) 3.5/5
GameTrailers	(X360) 8.1/10
Giant Bomb	(X360) 4/5
IGN	7.5/10
Joystiq	(X360) 3.5/5
Official Xbox Magazine (US)	(X360) 6.5/10
PC Gamer (UK)	(PC) 75%
PlayStation: The Official Magazine	(PS3) 7/10
411Mania	(X360) 8.5/10
Metro	(PS3) 6/10

Rock of Ages received "average" reviews on all platforms according to the review aggregation website Metacritic.

Inside Gaming Awards gave the game its 2011 Most Original Game award.

== Sequels ==
A sequel, titled Rock of Ages 2: Bigger & Boulder, which introduces a new four-player multiplayer mode, was released for Microsoft Windows, PlayStation 4 and Xbox One in August 2017, and on Nintendo Switch in May 2019. Rock of Ages III: Make & Break was released 21 July 2020 on Windows, Nintendo Switch, PlayStation 4, and Xbox One, and on 14 August 2020 for Stadia.
