= Snapshot Games =

Bulgarian video game developer

- Type: Subsidiary
- Industry: Video game developer
- Founded: 2013; 13 years ago
- Founders: Julian Gollop; David Kaye
- Headquarters: Sofia, Bulgaria
- Number of employees: 64 (2021)
- Parent: Saber Interactive (2020–2024); Embracer Group (2024–present)
- Website: snapshotgames.com

Snapshot Games is a Bulgarian video game developer headquartered in Sofia. Snapshot Games was founded in 2013 by Julian Gollop and David Kaye. Gollop is recognized for creating the X-COM video game franchise in the 1990s with X-COM: UFO Defense and X-COM: Apocalypse. Gollop also is the CEO of Snapshot Games. In addition to Gollop, the company includes about eight developers who are industry veterans with years of previous experience working for Ubisoft Sofia, Crytek Black Sea, and other Bulgaria studios.

== History ==
On November 12, 2013, Snapshot Games was founded as a privately held corporation in the state of California of the United States. However, it is based in Bulgaria where its CEO, Julian Gollop, lives and where video game development costs are about one-third of what they would be for a similar studio in the United States.

In April 2014, Snapshot Games launched a Kickstarter to crowdfund the development of its first video game, Chaos Reborn. The effort was successful, generating over $210,000. The game was made available through the Early Access program of Steam on December 9, 2014 before it was released officially on October 26, 2015. The game received a score of 86/100 on review aggregation website Metacritic. PC Gamer awarded it a score of 87%, saying "A true wizard’s wheeze, and a fine return for one of gaming’s oldest tactical classics." The game also was nominated for a Golden Joystick Award in the 2015 Best Indie Game category but lost to Kerbal Space Program.

Julian Gollop teased the development of a new video game, Phoenix Point, on Twitter on March 18, 2016. For the next year, Snapshot Games worked on designing and producing the game. After investing $450,000 into this first year of development, the company launched a Fig crowdfunding campaign in April 2017 to obtain the $500,000 they budgeted to complete the game. The future of Snapshot relied on the success of the campaign. "There is no Plan B," Gollop said to the press at the time. The campaign was successful, raising more than $765,000 from over 10,300 different contributors. Snapshot Games released Phoenix Point in 2019.

In November 2020, Embracer Group announced that it acquired the company through Saber Interactive. In March 2024, Embracer sold Saber and many of its studios to Beacon Interactive. However, Snapshot was not included in the deal and remains under Embracer.

In February 2025, the studio announced its next project, Chip ‘n Clawz vs. The Brainioids. Published by Arc Games, also a subsidiary of Embracer, it was the first to not be self-published by Snapshot Games. The game was released to positive reviews in August 2025.

In March of the same year, publisher Arc Games announced a video game adaptation of the board game Frosthaven, developed by Snapshot. The game entered early access four months later, in July.

== Video games ==
Year	Title	Platform(s)
2015	Chaos Reborn	Linux, Macintosh, Windows
2019	Phoenix Point	Macintosh, Windows, PlayStation 4, Xbox One, Stadia
2025	Chip ‘n Clawz vs. The Brainioids	Windows, PlayStation 5, Xbox Series X/S
TBD	Frosthaven	Windows
