= Zeno Clash =

2009 video game

- North American Windows cover
- Developer: ACE Team
- Publishers: Windows; WW: ACE Team (digital); EU: Iceberg Interactive; NA: Tripwire Interactive; Xbox 360; Atlus
- Engine: Source
- Platforms: Windows; Xbox 360
- Release: Windows: WW: 21 April 2009 (digital); EU: 16 October 2009; NA: 7 February 2010; Xbox 360; 5 May 2010
- Genre: Beat 'em up
- Mode: Single-player

Zeno Clash is a first-person fighting video game with elements of a first-person shooter. It is the debut game of developer ACE Team and uses the Source engine. It was released for download through content delivery service Steam on 21 April 2009. The Xbox 360 version, entitled Zeno Clash: Ultimate Edition, was released 5 May 2010 and contains additional features not found in the Windows version. The game is set in the fantasy world of Zenozoik, and follows Ghat, a young man who is on the run from his vengeful siblings, and Deadra, his female companion, as they travel through strange and exotic lands.

Critics praised its strange yet robust setting and unique character designs. It was a finalist for Excellence in Visual Art at the 2009 Independent Games Festival, and was named 2009's Independent Game of the Year by PC Gamer, and PC Game of the Month by IGN in April 2009.

== Gameplay ==
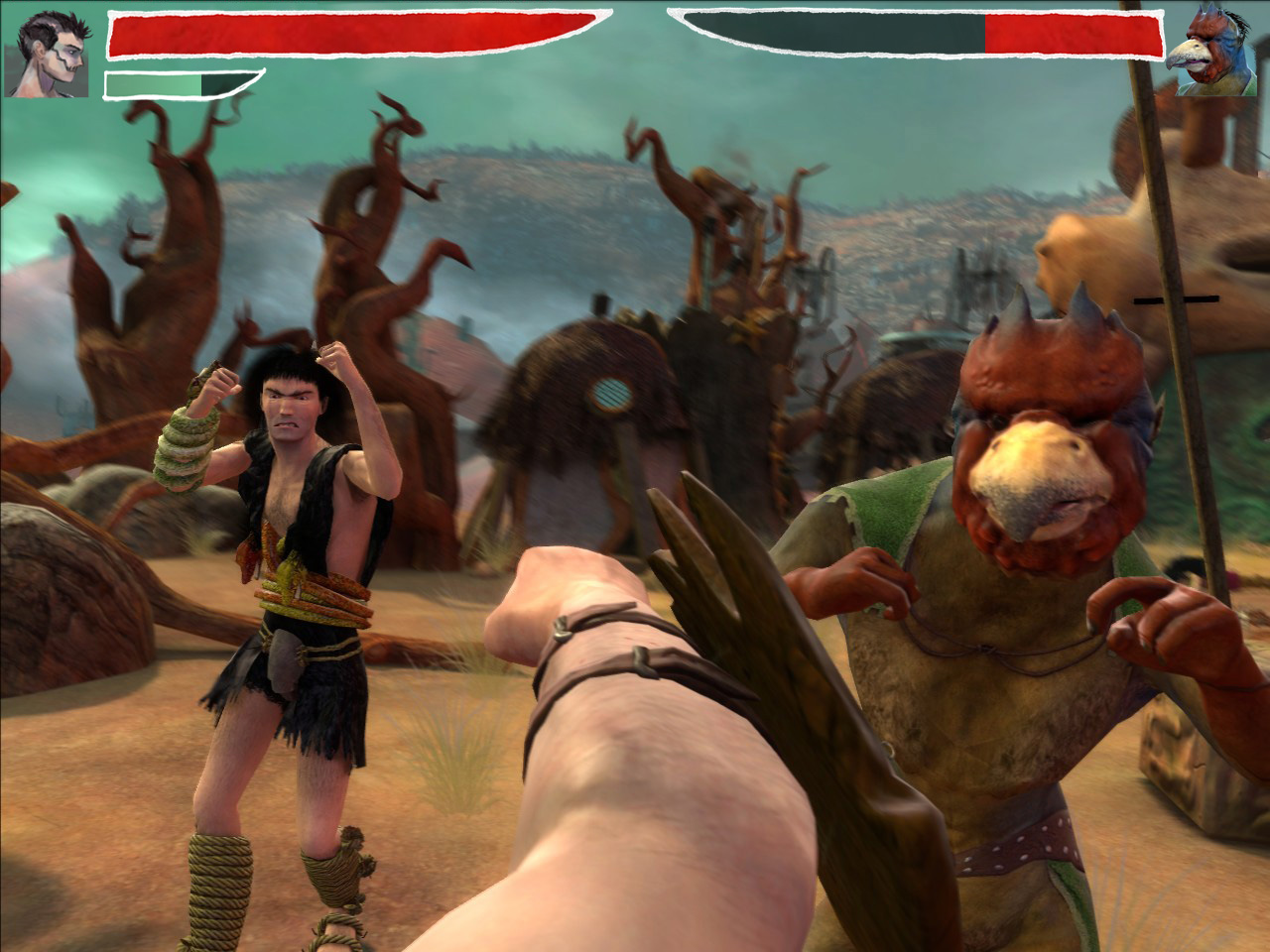
Zeno Clash places a heavy emphasis on first-person combat.

In the main story mode, players assume the role of Ghat and progress through the world of Zenozoik, visiting various locations in a linear sequence. Gameplay is presented in a first-person perspective, with occasional cutscenes in a third-person perspective. When the player enters certain areas, it triggers a scripted sequence, initiating a battle in which the player must defeat all enemies to proceed. Ghat is proficient in martial arts, and can dodge or counter enemy attacks. While there is a strong focus on unarmed combat, Ghat can also obtain unconventional melee and ranged weapons by several means, such as disarming enemies. Intermittent segments of gameplay happen similarly to a linear progression shooter.

In addition to the single-player story, Challenge Mode allows the player to defeat enemies while climbing a tower or descending into a pit. The results are ranked through Steam every time the player beats a tower floor's final boss.

== Plot ==
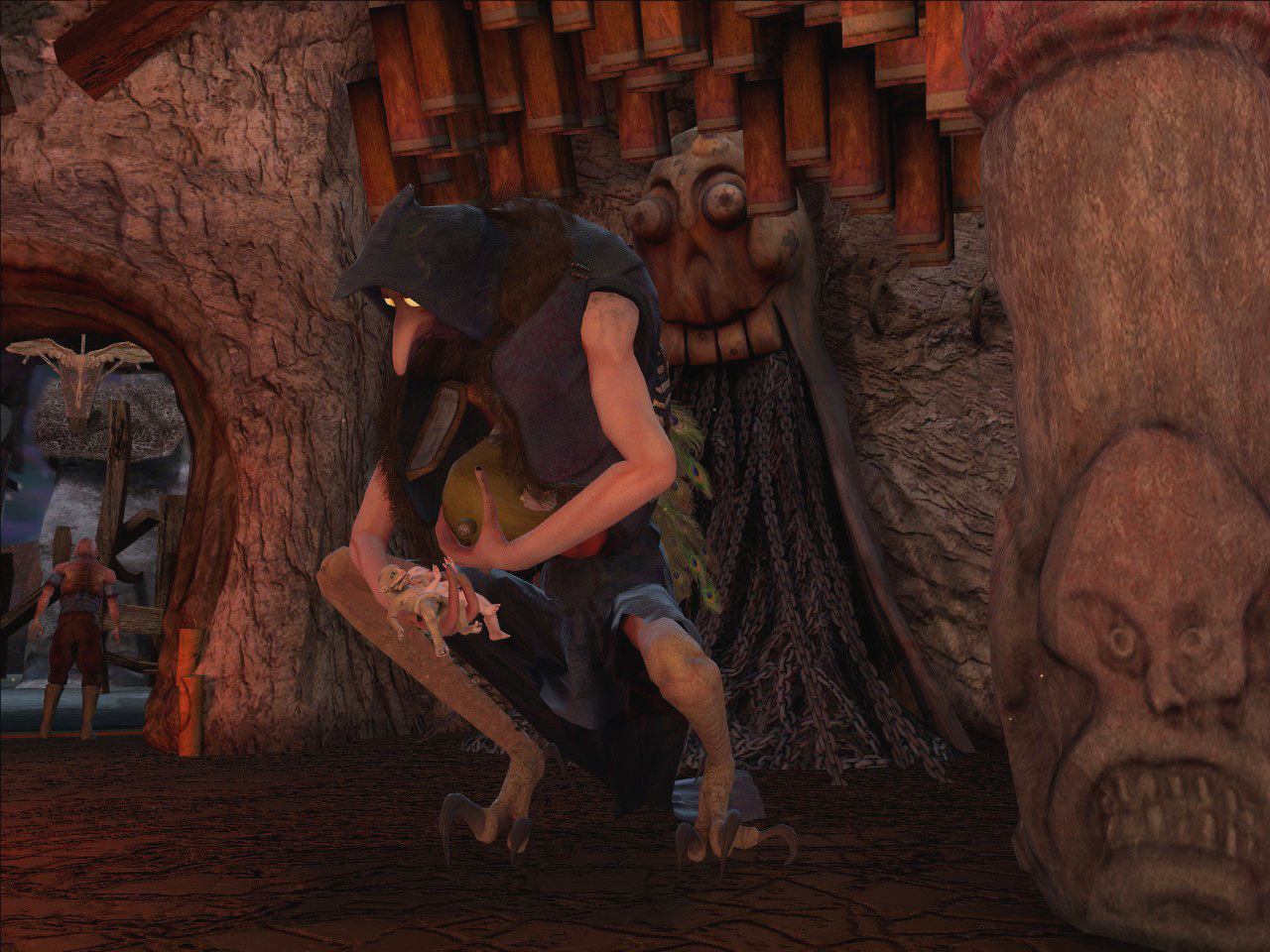
Father-Mother

The story takes place in a fictional fantasy world called Zenozoik, and begins in a town called Halstedom. The game begins with Ghat, the game's protagonist, regaining consciousness after setting off an explosion which kills Father-Mother, an ostensibly hermaphroditic creature, which has raised a large and influential family. Ghat is one of Father-Mother's children, who turned on it after discovering its secret. Ghat runs away from the town, chased by his brothers and sisters seeking to kill him, and is banished from his family. He is accompanied by a female companion named Deadra who has saved Ghat from apathy.

During their travels away from Halstedom, Ghat explains to Deadra through partially interactive flashbacks the events that led up to his attempt on Father-Mother's life. One of the first things that is mentioned is that he lived for a time with the Corwid of the Free, the insane residents of the forests of Zenozoik. While he has turned away from his past life as a Corwid, his brothers and sisters still consider him as one. Ghat still harbors a sense of admiration for the single-mindedness of Corwids. Regardless, when he encounters them a fight ensues.

Later on, Deadra and Ghat reach a large desert area. When Ghat returns from hunting rabbit-like creatures, he discovers a blind mercenary known only as the Hunter, who points a rifle at Deadra's head while she sleeps. The Hunter reveals that he was sent after them by Ghat's family, and was instructed to kill both him and Deadra. Ghat pleads for her life, and the Hunter agrees to let her live if Ghat will come to a secluded area with him to fight. Ghat manages to defeat the Hunter and then leaves with Deadra. Ghat and Deadra eventually reach the end of the world. It is there that they meet Golem, an ancient being placed there by an unknown group of people to wait there until he was needed. Golem has a complete knowledge of Ghat and Father-Mother's conflict, which he says he will end, along with all other conflicts.

Upon Ghat's return to the city, he is confronted by his angry brothers and sisters once more. After this confrontation, a heavily wounded Father-Mother reveals itself, showing that it is still alive. It declares another fight with Ghat to end the strife once and for all. A ferocious battle ensues, in which Ghat defeats Father-Mother once more. With Father-Mother at his mercy, he decides neither to kill it, nor reveal its secret. However, Golem discloses the secret anyway—that Father-Mother is actually a male creature that steals babies from their families. It is revealed that Ghat, upon inadvertently learning this, was chased out of town by Father-Mother in an attempt to protect his secret. The game ends after Golem makes several cryptic statements about their world and family.

== Development ==
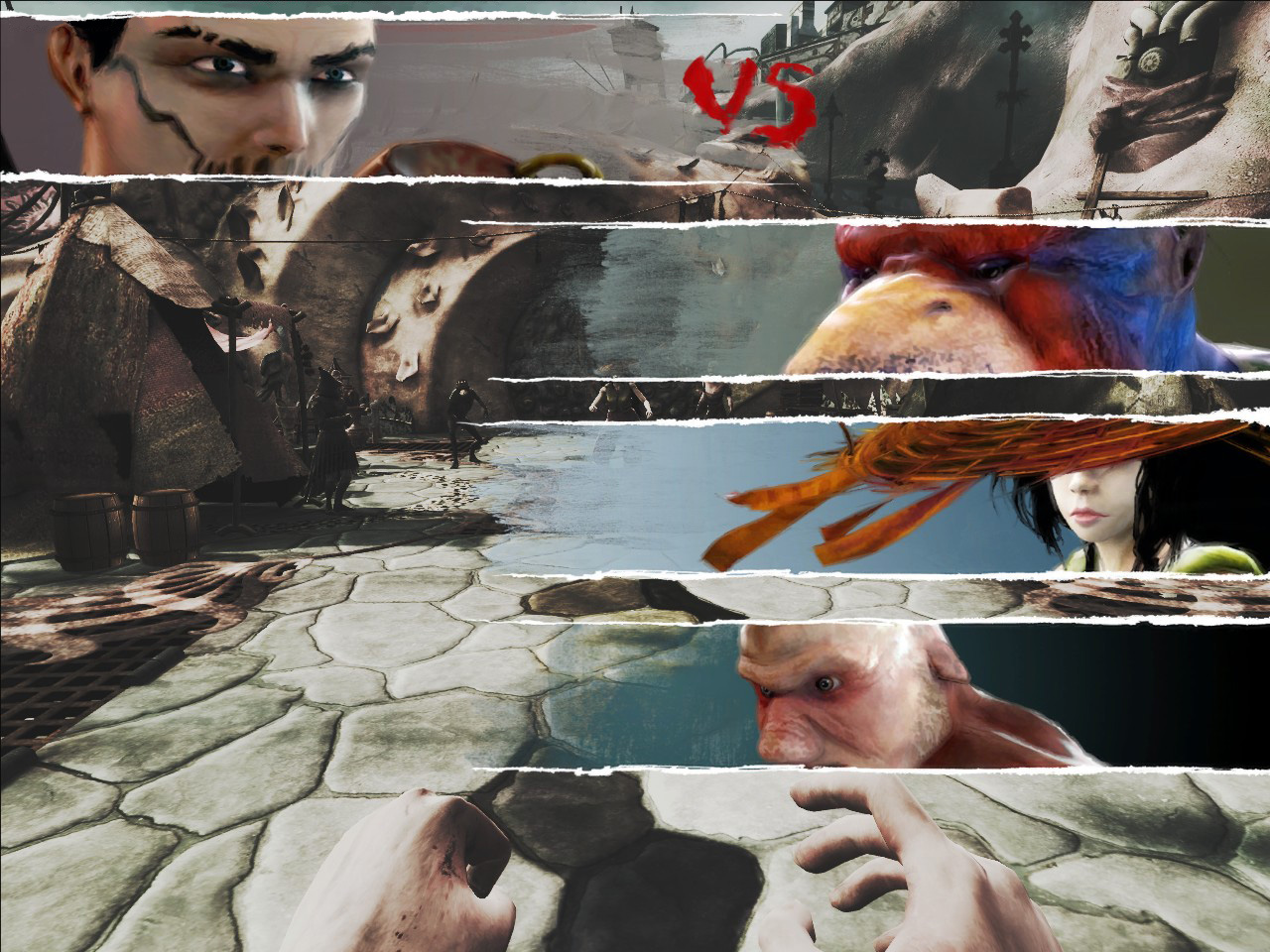
Zeno Clash uses slide-in versus screens before combat, akin to many fighting games.

While Zeno Clash was ACE Team's first original game, they have been developing game modifications since the 1990s. Their last project, Zenozoik, was far larger in scope than Zeno Clash, and attempted to incorporate the disparate elements of shooting, role-playing, melee combat and sandbox gameplay. ACE Team later realized that it was too ambitious for a small independent studio, and decided to make a more focused game. Zeno Clash is what emerged—player exploration is linear, and role-playing elements were excluded altogether. The game was initially conceived as a total conversion modification using the Source engine. ACE Team showed a demo version to Valve, the creators of the engine, who were impressed by the game's quality. The two companies then negotiated an engine licensing and distribution deal.

In an interview, the developers have stated that they consider the game to be a "First-Person Fighter (with some shooter elements)". They also likened it to "Dark Messiah meets Double Dragon", and stated that they have drawn a lot of inspiration from traditional fighting games—this includes "versus screens" sliding in before combat is initiated. Regarding the art style, they cited Hieronymus Bosch's paintings and John Blanche's "punk fantasy" illustrations as visual inspirations. They stated that publishers were unsure if consumers could relate to the art direction, but nonetheless stuck to their vision, creating a game that looks unlike anything else on the market. To get their desired organic look, they used static props exported from 3D Studio Max with pre-rendered lighting instead of using brush-based geometry that Source was specialized for.

In October 2009, ACE Team announced that they partnered with Atlus to release a port of the game for Xbox Live Arcade. This version of the game dubbed Zeno Clash: Ultimate Edition adds new game modes and features such as cooperative gameplay for tower challenges in both offline and online games, new attacks, new weapons, a new voice actress for the character Deadra, a character gallery and an awareness system. Zeno Clash: Ultimate Edition was released on Xbox Live Arcade on 5 May 2010.

In July 2009 the SDK of the game to allow easier modding was released by the developer.

== Marketing and release ==
The game was first released for download through Valve's content delivery service, Steam, on 21 April 2009, and is available for purchase either directly through Steam or via Direct2Drive. It was published for retail by Noviy Disk in Russia, and by Iceberg Interactive in Europe. In October 2009, Tripwire Interactive announced that it planned to publish the game for retail in North America "soon". Atlus announced that they would be bringing an Ultimate Edition of the game to the Xbox 360 as an Xbox Live Arcade download in March 2010. ACE Team continued to provide support post-release, releasing character models for use with another Source engine game, Garry's Mod, several new Challenge levels as free downloadable content, and a software development kit.

Zeno Clash received some press for its developers' reaction to copyright infringement. ACE Team member Carlos Bordeu left comments on many torrent sites saying that ACE Team did not intend to stop the unlicensed downloading of Zeno Clash, but rather implored downloaders to purchase the game if they enjoyed it. ACE Team later claimed that their unique approach, while probably not changing the minds of potential infringers, accidentally generated press which helped to market the product.

== Reception ==
Reception

Aggregate score
Aggregator	Score	
Aggregator	PC	Xbox 360
Metacritic	77/100	74/100

Review scores
Publication	Score	
Publication	PC	Xbox 360
The A.V. Club	C	N/A
Destructoid	7/10	N/A
Edge	8/10	N/A
Eurogamer	8/10	8/10
Game Informer	N/A	8/10
GamePro	N/A	4/5
GameRevolution	N/A	B
GameSpot	6.5/10	6.5/10
GameTrailers	N/A	7.9/10
GameZone	7.2/10	9/10
Giant Bomb	4/5	N/A
IGN	8.4/10	7/10
Official Xbox Magazine (US)	N/A	6/10
PC Gamer (US)	84%	N/A
Teletext GameCentral	N/A	6/10

Zeno Clash received "generally favourable reviews", while the Ultimate Edition received "mixed or average reviews", according to the review aggregation website Metacritic.

In January 2009, Zeno Clash was a nominated finalist in the Independent Games Festival yearly competition, in the category of Excellence in Visual Art. It was one of five games to be selected for this award, from a total of 226 participating titles. It was named PC Game of the Month by IGN for April 2009. It was praised for its originality and "satisfying sense of combat." It was a finalist in the category of Best Debut in the Tenth Annual Game Developer Choice Awards. It also won PC Gamer's 2009's Independent Game of the Year.

The gaming website Rock Paper Shotgun reviewed the game two days before its release, giving it four out of four thumbs up and highly recommending the title.

The unique visual design and story received high praise from most critics. The reviewers of Rock, Paper, Shotgun stated that while the art of the game was "really unusual to look at" they felt that the visuals were "something of a reward". Eurogamer's Dan Pearson called the PC version's environments "lushly crafted and massively colourful". Jamin Smith, reviewer for VideoGamer.com, felt that the Ultimate Edition's "narrative that was (probably) conjured up during an intense drug induced trip." He went on to call it world "incredibly cohesive" and stated that the story provided a perfect complement to the atmosphere. Jason Ocampo of IGN remarked in his review that "thanks to smart design and storytelling, it feels refreshingly original and completely compelling."

Reviewers were divided on gameplay aspects. 1Up.com's Scott Sharkey felt that the first-person fisticuffs were convincing when combined with camera motion; he compared such aspects to Mirror's Edge. Eduardo Reboucas of GameRevolution felt that the trigger-based controls of the Ultimate Edition took some getting used to and that some encounters with enemies can occasionally become frustrating. Ocampo felt that the hand-to-hand combat was "a bit clumsy, but wholly satisfying at the same time." Brett Todd of GameSpot was less favorable, calling it "simplistic" and "monotonous," citing its lack of variety in gameplay.

Sales for Ultimate Edition are reported as being significantly lower than the PC version. It did, however, place eighth in sales the week of its release.

== Sequel ==
On 19 May 2009 the developers announced that a sequel to Zeno Clash was in the works. Ghat reprises his role as the protagonist, and several characters such as Father-Mother and Golem return. ACE Team expressed a desire to incorporate elements of role-playing games that were present in their previous abandoned project, Zenozoik.

A third installment to Zeno Clash was set to release February 9 but was delayed and instead released March 9, 2023. Set in the same universe the plot follows a martial artist names Pseudo whose job is to protect a small creature with healing powers called the Boy.
