= Militarization of Belarus =

Militarization of Belarus is the process of the systematic transfer of state institutions, the economy, infrastructure, legislation, and the public life of the Republic of Belarus to a war footing. This process significantly intensified after the 2020 political crisis and the beginning of the full-scale Russian invasion of Ukraine in 2022. According to a number of analysts and monitoring groups, in particular the BELPOL association, the ruling regime of Alexander Lukashenko is consistently subordinating the country to Russian military strategy, effectively turning Belarus into a forward military staging ground for the Russian Federation and losing its own military sovereignty.

== Ideological indoctrination and militarization of society ==
Following the 2022 referendum, the category of "state ideology" was included in the Constitution, with which the regime legally enshrined its right to determine the path of citizens' development. The basis of this ideology became a cult of sacrifice in the name of the state, the exploitation of the theme of the Great Patriotic War, and hatred towards so-called "ideological enemies," which includes both domestic dissidents and the countries of the "collective West".

=== Education and children ===
In 2021, the Council of Ministers approved the Program for the Patriotic Education of the Population for 2022–2025, which established a systematic course for the military indoctrination of minors. The system covers all age groups: the game "Zarnichka" is held for children aged 9–10, "Zarnitsa" for those aged 11–14, "Orlyonok" for teenagers aged 15–16, and the "Vyzov" (Challenge) and "Proryv" (Breakthrough) tournaments are organized for students. The Ministry of Education, the pro-government youth union, and the Belaya Rus party were involved in the militarization process. The position of head of military-patriotic education (so-called "voenruk") was introduced in schools, a role most often filled by former military personnel without pedagogical education. Laser and shooting ranges are being massively equipped in educational institutions, and students are beginning to be taught how to operate combat unmanned aerial vehicles (UAVs). For 10th-grade boys, the duration of pre-conscription training was increased to ten days, with mandatory field training sessions at military units.

The scale of military training for children has grown significantly. During the summer holidays of 2023 alone, 736 military-patriotic camps were operational, hosting about 27,000 children (in 2022, there were 583 such camps). Nearly a hundred of them functioned directly on the bases of military units. The Ministry of Internal Affairs (MVD) is the most active in militarization, having created about 300 children's clubs covering 8,000 people by 2024, using the "Molodaya Gvardiya" (Young Guard) charity fund for their support. The financial burden of maintaining this fund was placed by the state on the enterprises of the Ministry of Industry. The degree of penetration of security agencies into education is demonstrated by the example of the city of Navapolatsk, where out of ten schools, eight found themselves under the patronage of various security structures, with one school even being patronized by Penal Colony No. 1.

A separate direction has been sending Belarusian children to Russian militarized camps, such as "Artek" (in annexed Crimea), "Orlyonok" (Tuapse), as well as to the "Patriot" military-patriotic park in Bashkortostan. The programs in these camps have a pronounced ideological and military character, including the study of combat robotics and drill training. An extensive network for recruiting youth was organized by the Russian federal agency Rossotrudnichestvo.

=== Militarization of the adult population ===
Militarization processes have affected not only the youth but also the adult population. A law "On the People's Militia" was adopted in Belarus, allowing individuals who are not subject to conscription to be involved in performing security tasks. For example, in the militia detachment of the town of Dzisna (Vitebsk Region), more than half of the participants were over 65 years old, and the commanders were 69 and 72 years old. In addition, in April 2024, the Ministry of Defense began retraining hunters from the Belarusian Society of Hunters and Fishermen (BOOR) for the military specialty of "sniper." Under the instructions of A. Lukashenko, the head of the society and former Minister of Internal Affairs Ihar Shunevich approved a plan according to which 200 of the "most loyal to the state" hunters had to be selected in each region of the country for sniper training.

The erasure of historical memory and national identity is actively being replaced by the ideology of the "Russian world" and the narrative of "brotherhood in arms" with the Russian army. Belarusian military Telegram channels (e.g., "BelVPO") constantly broadcast Russian propaganda, including denying war crimes committed by the Russian Armed Forces in Bucha and Irpin, and promoting the idea that the war against Ukraine is a "common cause." Belarusian officers actively participate in this, such as the deputy head of the General Staff faculty of the Military Academy, Colonel Andrei Bogodel. An example of the gradual erasure of the border between the military personnel of the two countries is the Commander of the Air Force and Air Defense Forces of Belarus, Major general Andrei Lukyanovich. Despite official biographies, according to an internal Ministry of Defense reference document obtained by BELPOL, he was born in Kazakhstan and was a citizen of Russia until the age of 30, having served in the Russian Armed Forces for ten years, and only received a Belarusian passport in 2000. It was he who, as deputy commander of the Air Force, oversaw the use of Belarusian airfields for Russian airstrikes on Ukraine in 2022.

== Restructuring of infrastructure and logistics ==
The state infrastructure of Belarus, primarily transport and communications, has been adapted to service Russian military logistics.

=== Belarusian Railway ===
The experience of early 2022 showed the readiness of the railway network for large-scale military operations. From January 17 to April 11, 2022, 11,889 wagons carrying Russian military cargo with a total mass of over 229,000 tons were delivered to Belarus. Unloading took place at 27 stations (the largest volumes were handled by Khoiniki, Asipovichy, Yelsk, Brest-Vostochny, and Rechytsa). During this period, the General Staff of the Armed Forces of Belarus and the Belarusian Railway (BCh) worked under the direct control of the Russian Ministry of Defense. This is evidenced by materials of a lawsuit in the Arbitration Court of the Moscow District, where representatives of the BCh officially confirmed that the management of military transport was handled by representatives of the Russian Military Communications Directorate.

After 2022, the management of the Belarusian Railway was strictly militarized. Former KGB and MVD officers were massively embedded into the leadership structure. Former KGB central apparatus officer Ihar Kazlouski became the deputy head of the railway for security, and similar positions appeared in all six branches of the railway. The entire 8th floor of the BCh Traffic Control Center in Minsk (about 600 square meters) was handed over as a restricted facility, where dozens of representatives of military communications and signaling agencies are constantly stationed. At the same time, the BCh unsealed and brought into practical readiness six backup control centers in each branch (including the center in Kroshyn), which allows controlling military trains even if the main center in Minsk is destroyed.

Military facilities are disguised as civilian ones. For example, on the territory of the former "Krychaw-6" airbase, a closed railway complex ("Track post 245 km") was built under the guise of a "logistics center," allowing Russian trains with equipment and ammunition to be received bypassing public stations. Around this facility in the Klimavichy district, an anti-drone defense system has been erected, which is unprecedented for Belarusian civilian structures. New railway infrastructure is also being built near the 1405th Artillery Base near the village of Vialikaya Harozha (Asipovichy District) and near the Navadvortsy station (Slutsk District).

=== Communications and airfields ===
The Ministry of Defense of Belarus uses the towers of the civilian mobile operator "MTS" (49% of the shares of which belong to Russian capital) to build a stationary military radio-relay network. The topology of this network is built not from the center to the borders, but along the main transit highways of the probable movement of Russian troops (for example, from the Russian city of Klintsy to Brest, from Smolensk to Minsk, and from Pskov to Gomel). Containers are installed on the towers to integrate Russian and Belarusian military equipment. In addition, a DMR standard trunked radio system network for security forces has been densely deployed in the southeastern part of the country, indicating the preparation of the region for functioning under martial law.

Belarusian airfields are also undergoing modernization with Russian equipment. In particular, modern Russian 12A6 "Sopka-2" en-route radar systems are being installed at the airbases in Babruysk and Lida, which are capable of operating without maintenance personnel, ensuring a highly intensive combat cycle of aviation use.

== Military-industrial complex and economy ==
One of the foundations of survival for many Belarusian enterprises has been the fulfillment of state defense orders (GOZ) for the Russian Federation. According to monitoring data, more than 120 Belarusian companies are involved in the Russian military-industrial complex.

The Ministry of Industry actively lobbies for the sale of Belarusian military products. For example, in 2024, the BelOMO holding supplied the Russian Ministry of Defense with 105,161 optical sights, rangefinders, and monoculars, which was 40 times the volume of the previous year. The Minsk Wheel Tractor Plant (MZKT) and other enterprises are under the tight control of Russian military representations (VP MO RF No. 1281 and No. 363), which oversee the execution of contracts and approve prices.

With Russian financing, ammunition production is being established in Belarus. The "Legmash" enterprise in Orsha and the Minsk Bearing Plant have mastered the production of parts for 122-mm rocket and 152-mm artillery shells. By 2027, the construction of a plant for assembling finished ammunition is planned to be completed near Slutsk, a cooperative effort involving dozens of enterprises (including BMZ, BelAZ, and Gomselmash). Since Belarus lacks its own production of gunpowder and explosives, even the "Bellegprom" concern has been drawn into the search for raw materials (for example, the Orsha Linen Mill was considered a supplier of flax for gunpowder production), and the Belarusian State Technological University began training specialists in the chemistry of energy-dense materials. Components for solid-fuel rocket engines (ammonium perchlorate, rubber) are purchased in China through the company Capital Sunrise International Inc..

Scientific institutions have also been drawn into military developments. The National Academy of Sciences has created the "Lead Republican Cluster of Unmanned and Light Aviation". The Scientific and Production Center for Multifunctional Unmanned Systems and the Institute of Powder Metallurgy (under the leadership of A. Ilyushchenko) develop and manufacture warheads for the "Mirotvorets", "Chekan", and "Burevestnik" strike drones. At the same time, Belarus is negotiating with the Iranian company Defense Industries Organization to establish a production line for 15,000 gun barrels for small arms per year based on the Minsk enterprise "Kidma Tech".

== Legislative changes ==
The legal facilitation of militarization and the de facto loss of military sovereignty began with the falsified 2022 constitutional referendum, as a result of which provisions regarding Belarus's aspiration for neutrality and non-nuclear status were removed from the Constitution. In December 2022, the defense ministers of Belarus and Russia signed a protocol that legalized the permanent presence of Russian troops in Belarus under the guise of a "regional group," effectively cementing Belarus's role as the "first echelon" in the event of a military conflict. This process culminated in the signing of the treaty "On Security Guarantees within the Framework of the Union State" in December 2024.

At the domestic level, numerous changes were made to the laws. SMS notifications for conscription were introduced, travel abroad for conscripts was restricted, and criminal liability for draft evasion was strengthened. The Law "On the Status of Military Personnel" allowed foreign citizens to be accepted into the Belarusian army and the MVD internal troops, creating a legal basis for integrating Russian military personnel and PMC mercenaries into the ranks of the Armed Forces of Belarus. Furthermore, a draft resolution of the Council of Ministers was prepared on engaging "volunteers" aged 16 and older to perform defense-related work (digging trenches, clearing rubble) for a payment of 15 rubles a day, resembling wartime labor mobilization.

== BELPOL report and international reaction ==
On October 12, 2026, at the Warsaw Security Forum, the association of former Belarusian security officers BELPOL, together with the initiative "Community of Railway Workers of Belarus," presented a large-scale analytical report titled "The Militarization of Belarus". The report, about 50 pages long, was published in Russian and English. The document was divided into two parts: an open part, available to the public with a description of the situation, and a closed part, which contained direct documentary evidence (copies of internal letters, waybills, plans, and reference documents). Following the publication of the document, the BELPOL website was subjected to a massive cyberattack.

The presentation of the report took place in the format of a closed roundtable titled "Belarus: Full-Scale Militarization," organized in partnership with the German Marshall Fund (GMF). The event was attended by about 50 international experts, diplomats, and politicians from Germany, Slovakia, Ukraine, Sweden, and other countries. The meeting was opened by the leader of the Belarusian democratic forces, Sviatlana Tsikhanouskaya, who stressed that the collected evidence should become the basis for concrete actions by international partners, including maintaining sanctions against the regime's military-industrial sector and bringing those responsible for dragging the country into the war to justice. BELPOL representatives (Matsvei Kupreichyk and Uladzimir Zhyhar) held discussions with European politicians regarding threats to the Baltic states, Poland, and Ukraine.

The published facts caused a significant resonance. Ukrainian media paid special attention to the deployment of a military radio-relay and trunked communications network in the south of Belarus, which creates an additional threat to the Kyiv, Zhytomyr, Rivne, and Volyn regions. Earlier, the Ministry of Foreign Affairs of Ukraine had already strongly criticized the militarization processes and the deployment of Russian tactical nuclear weapons, stating that such actions ultimately turn Minsk into an "accomplice to Russian nuclear blackmail".

== Bibliography ==
- The Militarization of Belarus: Analytical Report. BELPOL. 2026. p. 48.
