= XCOM =

Video game series

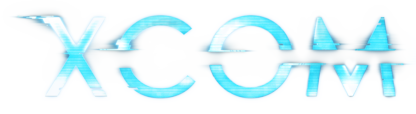
- Genres: Strategy; Turn-based tactics; Real-time tactics; Third-person shooter (Enforcer, The Bureau); Space flight simulator (Interceptor)
- Developers: Mythos Games (1994–1997); MicroProse (1994–2001); Irrational Games (2007–2013); 2K Marin (2007–present); Firaxis Games (2008–present)
- Publishers: MicroProse (1994–1998); Hasbro Interactive (1998–2001); Infogrames (2001–2002); 2K (2005–present)
- Creator: Julian Gollop
- Platforms: MS-DOS, Amiga, Amiga CD32, PlayStation, Windows, PlayStation 3, Xbox 360, OS X, iOS, Android, Linux, PlayStation Vita, PlayStation 4, Xbox One, Nintendo Switch
- First release: UFO: Enemy Unknown; March 1, 1994
- Latest release: XCOM: Chimera Squad; April 24, 2020

XCOM (originally called X-COM) is a science fiction video game franchise featuring an elite international organization tasked with countering alien invasions of Earth. The series began with the strategy video game UFO: Enemy Unknown created by Julian Gollop's Mythos Games and MicroProse in 1994. The original lineup by MicroProse included six published and at least two canceled games, as well as two novels. The X-COM series, in particular its original entry, achieved a sizable cult following and has influenced many other video games; including the creation of a number of clones, spiritual successors, and unofficial remakes.

A reboot series was published by 2K, beginning with the strategy video game XCOM: Enemy Unknown, developed by Firaxis Games and released in 2012 to critical and commercial success. It was followed by the prequel The Bureau: XCOM Declassified and the sequels XCOM 2 and XCOM: Chimera Squad.

== Games ==
=== Released ===
X-COM series (1994–2001)
XCOM reboot series (2012–present)

Title	Release	Developer	Publisher
UFO: Enemy Unknown (a.k.a. X-COM: UFO Defense)	1994	Mythos Games; MicroProse	MicroProse
X-COM: Terror from the Deep	1995	MicroProse	MicroProse
X-COM: Apocalypse	1997	Mythos Games; MicroProse	MicroProse
X-COM: Interceptor	1998	MicroProse	MicroProse
X-COM: First Alien Invasion	1999	Hasbro Interactive	Hasbro
X-COM: Enforcer	2001	Hasbro Interactive	Infogrames
XCOM: Enemy Unknown	2012	Firaxis Games	2K
The Bureau: XCOM Declassified	2013	Irrational Games; 2K Australia; 2K Marin	2K
XCOM: Enemy Within (expansion of XCOM: Enemy Unknown)	2013	Firaxis Games	2K
XCOM 2 (sequel to XCOM: Enemy Unknown)	2016	Firaxis Games	2K
XCOM 2: War of the Chosen (expansion of XCOM 2)	2017	Firaxis Games	2K
XCOM: Chimera Squad	2020	Firaxis Games	2K
XCOM: Legends	2021	Iridium Starfish	2K

=== Cancelled ===
Title	Developer
X-COM: Genesis	Hasbro Interactive
X-COM: Alliance	Hasbro Interactive; Infogrames

=== Original X-COM series (1994–2001) ===
Aggregate review scores As of November 17, 2011.
Game	GameRankings
UFO: Enemy Unknown (X-COM: UFO Defense)	(PC) 94% (PS) 93%
X-COM: Terror from the Deep	(PS) 100% (PC) 86%
X-COM: Apocalypse	(PC) 87%
X-COM: Interceptor	(PC) 70%

The X-COM core series consisted of four main games published by MicroProse: UFO: Enemy Unknown (also known as X-COM: UFO Defense, MS-DOS and Amiga in 1994, PlayStation 1995), X-COM: Terror from the Deep (MS-DOS in 1995, PlayStation 1996), X-COM: Apocalypse (MS-DOS in 1997) and X-COM: Interceptor (Windows in 1998). The premise of the franchise is that an alien invasion beginning in 1999 prompts the creation of a clandestine paramilitary organization codenamed X-COM (an abbreviation of "Extraterrestrial Combat") by a coalition of funding nations. The player is charged with leading this force and tasked to secretly engage and research the alien threat. The sequels, against new alien invasions, are set underwater (Terror from the Deep, set in 2040), in a futuristic megacity (Apocalypse, set in 2084), and in space (Interceptor, set in 2067 and making it a prequel to Apocalypse).

UFO: Enemy Unknown, featuring a turn-based ground combat system, remains the most popular and successful game in the series, having been often featured on various lists of best video games of all time. The first sequel, Terror from the Deep, was quickly created by MicroProse's internal team; based on the same game engine and used largely identical gameplay mechanics. Apocalypse took several new directions with the series, introducing an optional real-time combat system and shifting the aesthetics to a retro-futuristic style. A spin-off game, Interceptor, constitutes a hybrid of a strategy game and a space combat flight simulator.

After Interceptor, Hasbro Interactive purchased MicroProse, acquiring its studios and the X-COM brand. There were talks of X-COM toys, comics, and even a cartoon show. A budget range, turn-based tactical play-by-mail multiplayer game X-COM: First Alien Invasion was released in 1999. In 2001, Hasbro published X-COM: Enforcer, a poorly received third-person shooter loosely based on the events of Enemy Unknown, marking a low point in the series. The X-COM games were also released as part of four compilation releases: X-COM (Collector's Edition) (1998), X-COM Collection (1999) and X-COM: Complete Pack (2008), as well as in 2K Huge Games Pack in 2009.

At least two more major titles have been planned for this series. One of them was X-COM: Genesis, a real-time strategy and tactics game "going back to the roots but in full 3D." Another was X-COM: Alliance (also known as X-COM 4 and the project Fox Force Five), an Aliens-inspired mix of strategy game and first-person perspective tactical shooter, using the licensed original Unreal Engine. However, both of these projects were cancelled after ex-MicroProse Hasbro Interactive studios were all shut down in 1999–2000 (with Alliance being later abortively reactivated in 2001-2002 before being quietly cancelled again without any official announcement). Terry Greer, a former senior artist and head of game design at MicroProse UK, disclosed: "We'd also discussed other avenues for future games including time travel, retaking the solar system (with interplanetary distances playing a significant role in recruitment and resources), and resistance movement concept where you had to fight back after the world was taken and humanity was totally under the alien yoke."

OpenXcom is an open source re-implementation of the first game in the series intended to fix all the bugs and enable modding. OpenApoc is a similar open source project for X-COM: Apocalypse.

=== XCOM series (2012–present) ===
Aggregate review scores As of September 27, 2016.
Game	Metacritic
XCOM: Enemy Unknown	(360) 90 (PC) 89 (PS3) 89
The Bureau: XCOM Declassified	(PS3) 69 (360) 68 (PC) 66
XCOM: Enemy Within	(iOS) 92 (360) 88 (PS3) 88 (PC) 86
XCOM 2	(PC) 88 (PS4) 88 (XONE) 87
XCOM: Chimera Squad	(PC) 77

In 2010, 2K Marin announced they were working on re-imagining of X-COM, relabeled as XCOM. It was described as a tactical and strategic first-person shooter that would combine elements from the original X-COM alongside a new setting and viewpoint while keeping some main concepts from the original game series. The setting received a complete overhaul, now based in the early 1960s, with the original XCOM organization being a secret U.S. federal agency. Originally planned for 2011, the game was repeatedly redesigned by different studios before being finally released in 2013 as The Bureau: XCOM Declassified for Windows, OS X, PlayStation 3 and Xbox 360.

In 2012, Firaxis Games (led by MicroProse co-founder Sid Meier) announced the development of a Windows, PlayStation 3 and Xbox 360 strategy game XCOM: Enemy Unknown, a "re-imagination" of UFO: Enemy Unknown with real-time strategic view, turn-based combat and destructible tactical environments more in the vein of the original X-COM game and set in a more contemporary setting than the XCOM game by 2K Marin. XCOM: Enemy Unknown was released later that same year to critical acclaim, winning multiple "Game of the Year" awards. X-COM creator Julian Gollop hailed it as "a phoenix rising from the ashes of the X-COM disaster," saying that "it's amazing that after 20 years, a brand that had gone so badly in the wrong direction has finally been put right." It was also ported to Android, iOS, OS X, Linux, and PlayStation Vita. In 2013, Firaxis released a downloadable content for the base game XCOM: Enemy Unknown titled XCOM: Enemy Within. It was made available for PC (which requires Enemy Unknown to play), as well as for iOS, the PlayStation 3 and Xbox 360 (those versions are standalone and do not require Enemy Unknown).

In 2015, Firaxis announced a sequel, XCOM 2. It was released in 2016 for Windows, PlayStation 4, Xbox One, OS X, and Linux (later ported to several other platforms, including the Nintendo Switch, but not iOS). Its expansion, XCOM 2: War of the Chosen, followed in 2017. The game is set in an alternate reality after the events of X-COM: Enemy Unknown in which the aliens won the war and rule Earth and X-COM tries to overthrow them.

The next game in the series, XCOM: Chimera Squad, was released in April 2020, for Windows. Unlike the global scale of previous games, Chimera Squad focused on a specific city, giving the player control of a diverse squad of humans and aliens. The game introduced several changes to game mechanics, such as replacing randomly generated and customizable squad members with preset and unique soldiers, and utilizing "interleaved turns" (mixing turn order between the opposing teams during combat) instead of a team-by-team turn system.

=== Julian Gollop's unofficial games ===
The Dreamland Chronicles: Freedom Ridge was a game for the PC and PlayStation 2 by Julian Gollop's Mythos Games (creators of UFO: Enemy Unknown and X-COM: Apocalypse), claimed to having been "essentially a remake of the first X-Com with 3D graphics." The Dreamland Chronicles was canceled in 2001 and Mythos Games soon ceased to exist.

Laser Squad Nemesis is a 2002 low-budget PC turn-based tactics game developed by Gollop's next company Codo Technologies and very similar to the turn-based Battlescape combat system of the first X-COM. In 2005, Codo Technologies and publisher Namco also released Rebelstar: Tactical Command, a Game Boy Advance turn-based tactical role-playing game that too was reminiscent of the early Battlescape system.

Phoenix Point is a strategy and turn-based tactics video game for Windows, and OS X that has the open world, strategic layers of the X-COM style games of the 1990s like Enemy Unknown and Apocalypse together with the presentation and tactical mechanics of the more recent Firaxis reboot games. The game was developed by Gollop with Snapshot Games, an independent game studio in Bulgaria. Phoenix Point, described as a spiritual successor to X-COM, was released in December 2019.

== Other media ==
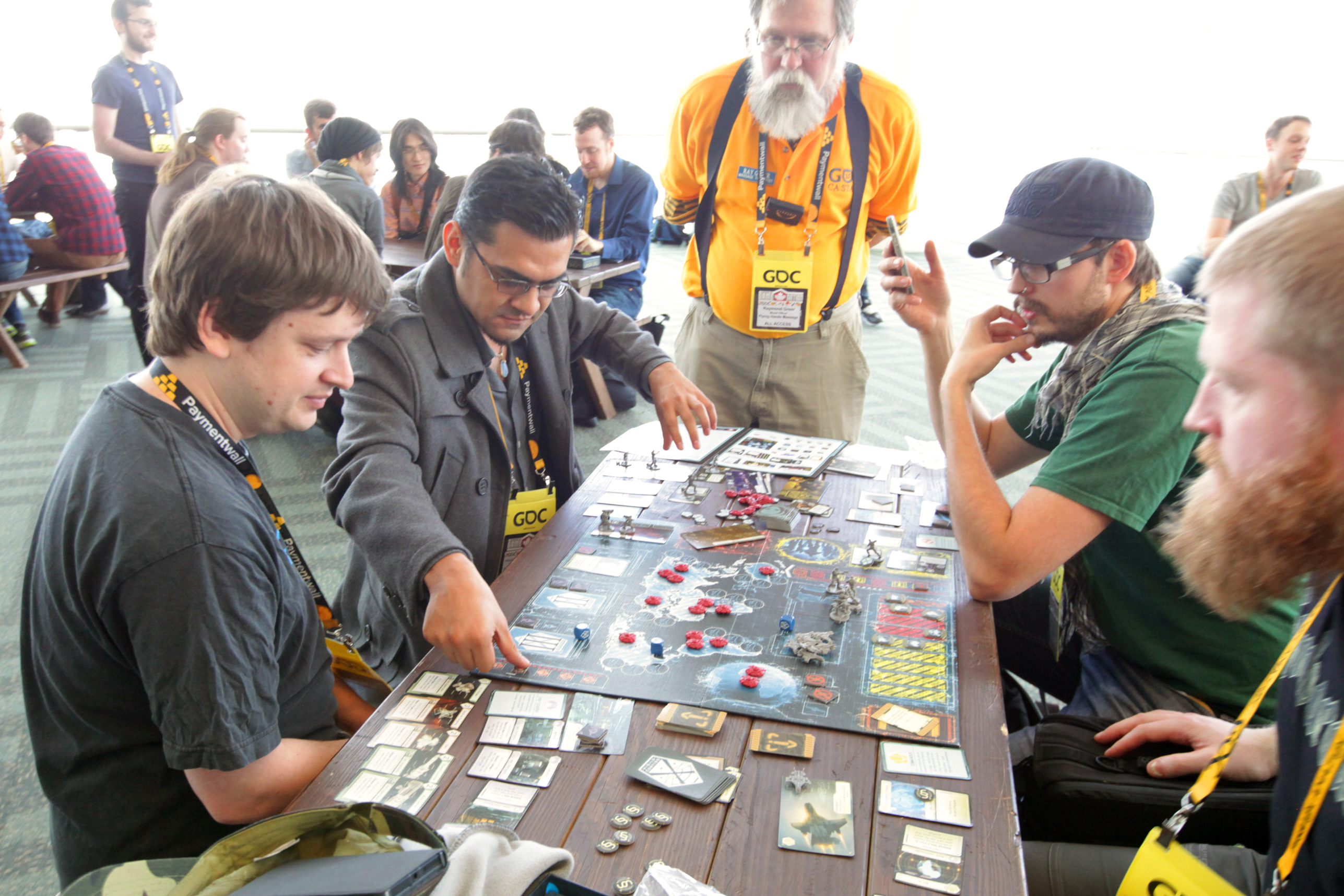
The board game at the GDC 2015

=== Literature ===
Two X-COM novels have been published based on the first game in the series: Diane Duane's X-COM: UFO Defense - A Novel (1995, ISBN 0-7615-0235-1) and Vladimir Vasilyev's Enemy Unknown (1997). The reboot series' novel is titled XCOM 2: Resurrection by Greg Keyes and was published in 2015, bridging the plots of XCOM and its sequel. In 2017, a second novel was published with the title XCOM 2: Escalation by Rick Barba.

MicroProse's manual/documentation writer John Possidente also wrote three short stories, "Decommissioning", "Manley's Deposition", and "Moray in the Wreck", taking place between the events of the first two games in the series. More recently, X-COM co-designer Dave Ellis and artist Jon McCoy released a free online tribute digital comic titled Deep Rising, with music created by X-COM composer John Broomhall.

=== Board game ===
A board game entitled XCOM: The Board Game, designed by Eric M. Lang and based on the 2012 reboot, was released on January 28, 2015, by Fantasy Flight Games.

== Intellectual property rights ==
The trademark for the X-COM name was filed on May 25, 1995, by MicroProse Software. According to Julian Gollop, "They wanted us to do a deal where we would sign over any rights that we might have in return for some cash plus a high royalty on X-COM: Apocalypse. They more or less insisted on it, otherwise they were threatening to cancel the Apocalypse project, so there was a lot of bluff involved." Following the acquisition and subsequent merger of MicroProse with Hasbro, the X-COM intellectual property (IP) was also transferred to Hasbro Interactive on August 19, 1998. Due to financial difficulties, Hasbro Interactive was sold to Infogrames Entertainment SA on January 29, 2001. As part of this transfer, the X-COM IP was legally transferred to Infogrames on December 21, 2001 (shortly thereafter, Infogrames was renamed Atari SA). In 2005, Atari SA transferred several IPs to Take-Two Interactive Software Inc. and X-COM was transferred with them on June 12, 2005.

The X-COM IP is currently owned by Take-Two and its subsidiaries; by 2007, first rumors emerged that Irrational Games (who are owned by Take-Two) were developing a new X-COM title (this game eventually became The Bureau: XCOM Declassified). In May 2007, 2K Games (a subsidiary of Take-Two) inherited the X-COM franchise and re-released Terror from the Deep on Steam. In September 2008, UFO: Enemy Unknown, Apocalypse, Interceptor and Enforcer were also re-released as downloadable titles. 2K Games' XCOM, which had been in development since 2003 (prior to the IP acquisition), was finally completed and released in 2012.

== Inspired titles ==
Because of the series' popularity, various other developers have created spiritual successor games similar in theme and tone to the X-COM games (sometimes called "X-COM clones"; Julian Gollop also himself called turn-based tactical game genre in general as "sons of Rebelstar" in a reference to one of his earlier games). The level to which they borrow from the original series varies.

=== Commercial games ===
- Abomination: The Nemesis Project is a real-time tactics / action game developed by Hothouse Creations and released by Eidos Interactive for the PC in 1999 that has been touted as "X-COM meets Day of the Dead in real-time."
- Aliens versus Humans is a UFO: Enemy Unknown clone for the iPhone, iPad and Android. Gollop highlighted it an example of "indie remakes" in his "X-Com legacy" chart.
- Guardians: Agents of Justice was an unreleased game by Simtex and MicroProse, which was described as "a superhero version of X-COM."
- Incubation: Time Is Running Out is a turn-based combat PC game that was considered to be "what X-Com Apocalypse should have been". It was developed and released by German company Blue Byte in 1997.
- Isomer was an indie strategy game project, currently abandoned, that was also heavily influenced by the X-COM series as well as other games such as Dwarf Fortress and Minecraft. It blends realtime strategy combat with world exploration and sandbox gameplay.
- UFO: Aftermath is a 2003 single-player PC strategy and real-time tactics game which was heavily influenced by the X-COM series and used elements of the Mythos Games' canceled The Dreamland Chronicles. It was created by Czech company ALTAR Interactive and published by Tri Synergy.
  - Aftermath was followed by two sequels: UFO: Aftershock in 2005 and UFO: Afterlight in 2007.
- UFO: Extraterrestrials, a PC strategy / turn-based tactics game that is an unofficial sequel to the X-COM games, developed by Czech developer Chaos Concept and released by Tri Synergy in 2007.
  - The follow-up game, UFO2Extraterrestrials: Shadows over Earth was originally supposed to be released in Q4 of 2012, but as of 2021 has no official release date. It still remains in development simultaneously with UFO2Extraterrestrials: Battle for Mercury which is announced to launch Spring of 2021.
- UFO Online (unrelated to UFO Online: Fight for Earth) is a free-to-play, tactical MMORPG that is available only in Russian.
- UFO Online: Fight for Earth is a Steam and browser-based massively multiplayer tactical game. Gollop called it "actually more a clone of Incubation." It can be played in the free-to-play system using a micropayment system to generate revenue.
- Xenonauts is a PC strategy game by British independent studio Goldhawk Interactive, again heavily influenced by the X-COM series. It is being marketed as a Cold War-era (1979 instead of 1999) re-imagining of the original UFO: Enemy Unknown and an answer to 2K's The Bureau: XCOM Declassified which alienated some of the X-COM fanbase due to its FPS-based gameplay. The game missed several release dates, but was finally released in June 2014.
  - Xenonauts 2 was released on July 18, 2023 through early access.

The franchise was also referenced in the Civilization series of strategy video games that had partially inspired X-COM in first place. The original game received an unofficial sequel in the 1997 expansion set Civ II: Fantastic Worlds for MicroProse's Civilization II, in a scenario set on the Phobos moon of Mars. Firaxis' Civilization V features a unit type named XCOM Squad.

=== Fan games ===
Fan-remake projects for UFO: Enemy Unknown have included X-com - Last Hope (a mod of Half-Life 2 released in 2006), UFO: The Two Sides (development halted in 2011 due to copyright issues), UFO: Cydonia's Fall (canceled in 2012), X-COM: Origin (canceled in 2013), and The Rebel Squad (an also defunct project by Sam Liu).

- UFO: Alien Invasion is an open source, cross-platform, 3D strategy / turn-based tactics fan game heavily influenced by the X-COM series.
  - A similar open source game, but which never left a pre-release phase (last updated in 2011) was X-Force: Fight for Destiny.
  - Another, Project Xenocide, was aborted in 2010.
- Xenowar is an open source, simple tactical game for Android and Windows.
- X-Com: Tactical is a board game reproducing the squad tactics element of the first game.

== See also ==
- Laser Squad: a science fiction tactical game by the original creators of X-COM and an immediate predecessor of X-COM (UFO: Enemy Unknown originally began development as Laser Squad 2).
- Rebelstar series: precursor games to both Laser Squad and the X-COM series, also created by the same developers.
