= Zarnitsa =

Zarnitsa (Russian: Зарница, "heat lightning") may refer to:

- Zarnitsa (game), Young Pioneer war game, Soviet Union
- Zarnitsa, Uragan-class guard ship
- Zarnitsa radar, developed by the Marine Scientific Research Institute of radioelectronics

== Toponyms ==
- Zarnitsa mine, diamond mine, Russia
- Zarnitsa, Altai Krai, populated place in Russia
- Zarnitsa, Tula Oblast, Russia
- Zarnitsa, Gomel Region, Belarus
