= X-COM: Enforcer =

2001 video game

- Developer: Infogrames Interactive Hunt Valley Studio
- Publisher: Infogrames
- Designer: Will Gee
- Series: X-COM
- Engine: Unreal Engine 1
- Platform: Microsoft Windows
- Release: NA: April 17, 2001; EU: October 26, 2001
- Genre: Third-person shooter
- Modes: Single-player, multiplayer

X-COM: Enforcer is a third-person shooter video game developed by Infogrames Interactive Hunt Valley Studio and published by Infogrames in 2001 for Microsoft Windows. It is the sixth game in the X-COM series, but takes place in a timeline separate from those established by the first four games of the series and lacks the strategy game elements of previous games.

The game received mainly mixed reviews from critics, and was the last game released in the series until Firaxis Games' 2012 reboot.

== Gameplay ==
In single player mode, the player assumes the role of the combat robot named Enforcer. The game takes place from a third person perspective and uses both the keyboard and mouse as controls. The aim of each level revolves mainly around killing aliens and rescuing hostages. Each kill results in "data points" being dropped by the deceased aliens, which Enforcer can pick up and use between missions to accomplish research. Enforcer can also pick up "Unresearched objects" which expands the available research paths resulting in new weapons and armor. The aim of majority of the missions is to destroy alien transporter drones to prevent them from teleporting into various sites around the transporter. Some mission has the player to survive from alien waves, protecting important facilities, and fighting bosses. Puzzles which present themselves in the game are simple and the focus of gameplay centres on continual action and continual masses of aliens.

== Plot ==
The game is set during the First Alien War in 1999. Unmentioned in the storyline as played out by UFO: Enemy Unknown, funding was being provided to a program tasked with creating the ultimate robot warrior and led by a Professor Able Standard. However, owing to funding cuts by nations involved with the X-COM program, they were forced to abandon the project. Professor Standard refused to stop the project, carrying it on in secret in the Nevada desert. On completion, Enforcer was unleashed on the invading alien hordes.

Set during the first alien war, the game follows Enforcer as he defeats alien forces throughout the United States, including several special alien creations aimed to destroy him. In the end, Able Standard discovers the alien mothership, which is behind the recent attacks on Earth. It is about to unleash an attack on Earth, and only Enforcer can stop it. Even though the professor is mortally wounded by aliens, he, in his last moments, sends Enforcer through a teleport right to the mothership. Eventually this leads to a showdown with a cloaked alien leader known as "High Ethereal", who taunts the Enforcer, and after the Ethereal is defeated the mothership self-destructs and Enforcer is jettisoned into space, with the scientist's dying words echoing through its mind before fading to black.

== Development ==
When launching production of the game, Hasbro canceled two other X-COM games that were in production at the time: X-COM: Alliance and X-COM: Genesis. Given that Hasbro Interactive went out of business shortly after the release of X-COM: Enforcer, it used Alliance and Genesis resources in order to quickly make something with the X-COM brand.

== Reception ==
Reception

Aggregate score
Aggregator	Score
Metacritic	65/100

Review scores
Publication	Score
Computer Games Magazine	2.5/5
Computer Gaming World	2/5
GameRevolution	D
GameSpot	6.4/10
GameSpy	73%
IGN	8/10
Jeuxvideo.com	12/20
Next Generation	2/5
PC Gamer (US)	57%
PC Zone	68%

The game received "mixed" reviews according to the review aggregation website Metacritic. Steve Butts of IGN stated that the game is "pretty much nonstop action" and that it was perfect for when [one has] only got fifteen minutes to kill". Greg Kasavin of GameSpot was more cautious, noting that "it's as mindless of a shooter as they come, and you can't help but be disappointed at the thought of this, in light of the series' roots as a mentally stimulating strategy game." Jason D'Aprile of Computer Games Magazine was even harsher, stating: "X-COM lovers will hate this game, and it's clear the label was just tacked on as some lame attempt to cash in on the series' brand appeal." Jason Samuel of NextGen said that the game was "fast and furious, but ultimately too shallow for the price."

Retrospective reviews have been far more negative. On August 14, 2021, Richard Cobbett of PC Gamer made fun of the relatively high Metacritic score that this "crap" game has received and called Enforcer "one of the worst spin-offs ever squirted out on the PC."
