= X-COM: Alliance =

Cancelled video game

- 1999 logo
- Developers: MicroProse Chipping Sodbury Studio (1995–1999); MicroProse Hunt Valley Studio/Infogrames Interactive Hunt Valley Studio (1999–2002)
- Publishers: MicroProse (1995-1998); Hasbro Interactive (1998-2001); Infogrames (2001-2002)
- Producers: John Broomhall, Grant Dean, Stuart Whyte (UK); Martin DeRiso (Chapel Hill)
- Designers: Andrew Williams, Terry Greer, Marc Curtis (UK); Chris Clark (Chapel Hill)
- Series: X-COM
- Engine: Unreal Engine 1
- Platform: Microsoft Windows
- Release: Unreleased
- Genres: Tactical shooter, strategy, action role-playing
- Modes: Single player, multiplayer

X-COM: Alliance is a cancelled video game in the X-COM series. The game was developed by two different teams of MicroProse developers (first as a subsidiary of Spectrum Holobyte, then Hasbro Interactive, and finally Infogrames Entertainment) between 1995 and 2002. It had the player assume the role of commander of the militarized scientific mission lost in space during the aftermath of X-COM: Terror from the Deep.

Unlike other games in the X-COM series, most of which were strategy games, Alliance was a first-person shooter. It was described as having strategy, adventure, and role-playing elements. After being officially announced in 1998 for a planned release in the first half of 1999, the game was repeatedly delayed and put on hold, before eventually becoming vaporware; it was eventually cancelled in 2002. Since then, it had numerous build versions leaked online.

== Gameplay ==
A promotional screenshot from the version shown at the E3 1999

The gameplay of X-COM: Alliance would emphasize team management and tactics. Through the first-person perspective, the player would assemble and lead squads through a series of story-driven missions with various primary and secondary (optional) objectives. Teams of up to four members would be selected from a pool of soldiers, scientists and engineers (and later also friendly aliens). Each team member would have different skills as well as their own unique abilities, voices, personalities and attitudes, and was supposed to be acting differently from the others even if put in similar situations. The characters' speech, movement, and combat effectiveness would also rely on their emotional state, influenced by their individual personal traits and conditions such as their surroundings and levels of morale and fatigue.

Additionally, a large 2D component was planned for the game's management and research part. Besides the single-player mode, multiplayer co-operative, deathmatch, and capture the flag modes were being planned as well.

== Plot ==
The game takes place in the year 2062 (22 years after the events of X-COM: Terror from the Deep and five years before X-COM: Interceptor), when the research vessel UGS Patton, with a crew of top scientists and engineers and team of X-COM soldiers, travels to a site of the former alien base at Cydonia on the surface of Mars to retrieve alien artifacts and establish an Elerium mining facility. However, the Patton goes through an unexpected dimensional wormhole gateway and ends up stranded 60 light years from Earth, finding the alien invaders from UFO: Enemy Unknown to be engaged in a war with a new alien race, the Ascidians. The crew of the Patton joins forces with the Ascidians, and the alliance gives the game its name. Eight other new alien races were going to be introduced too.

== Development ==
Screenshots of the distinctive 2D (strategic) and 3D (tactical/shooter) sections in an early (before 1999) version of X-COM: Alliance

The concept for the game was originally conceived in 1995. Its initial working title was X-COM 4 (later X-COM 5); the project was code-named Fox Force Five to stop media leaks.

Development work began in 1996 at MicroProse's UK Studio in Chipping Sodbury, then led by the Terror from the Deep producer Stuart Whyte and designer Andrew G. Williams, who had also worked together on the Amiga and PlayStation ports of the first two X-COM games (Williams was also simultaneously a co-producer of X-COM: Apocalypse). The game's concept was inspired in part by the head-mounted cameras of the Colonial Marines in the film Aliens. The use of such cameras was also similar to the 1993 video game Hired Guns, co-created by Scott Johnston, a programmer in the original development team of Alliance. According to Whyte, the game was intended to be multiplayer-based, possibly with one player becoming the team leader and directing the other players. X-COM Alliance used the Unreal Engine. Deformable and destructible environments (as in the X-COM strategy games) were one of the game's planned features; the game engine later created for Red Faction employed a similar concept.

In April 1999, when "much of the foundation work had already been set," the work on the game was then taken over by MicroProse's Hunt Valley studio (creators of Klingon Honor Guard). Chris Clark became the new lead designer and Chris Coon was lead programmer on the project; artists included Bob Kathman. The game was redesigned, including a complete overhaul of the game graphics and HUD. Dave Ellis provided game design advice, helping to coordinate elements such as the featured weapons and alien races for canon compatibility between Alliance and the other X-COM title in development, X-COM: Genesis. The game was supposed to use the heavily modified Unreal Engine, featuring skeletal animation, motion capture, a completely different AI, a new sound system able to store and playback large amounts of speech, and a DirectMusic-based dynamic music system. The 1999 E3 conference by MicroProse featured people dressed up as aliens and other items from the game's universe, but the display did not include a playable demo. Julian Gollop, main designer of X-COM: UFO Defense and X-COM: Apocalypse, said MicroProse had problems to make the game's engine to work properly.

The game, set for a Q4-2000 release, was pushed back again in August 2000 to "sometime in the year 2001." In January 2000, producer Martin DeRiso stated that the game was "60–70%" complete. However, the project was put on indefinite hold in late 2000, when the Hunt Valley studio was redirected to begin work on the much less-ambitious X-COM: Enforcer, using some resources from Alliance.

In January 2001, Alliance had supposedly resumed development, and its new release date was set to the third quarter of 2001. After Infogrames Entertainment bought Hasbro Interactive, the game was postponed again because of the departure of a key team member (responsible for the implementation of the game's innovative AI system). Infogrames created an official website in February 2002, only to pull it down a few days later. The game was ultimately aborted in 2002 without any official announcement. Gollop commented: "X-COM: Alliance was in development for a long time. How the development got screwed up, I don't know. As you're probably well aware, quite often games companies start and you're going for a long time and it just doesn't happen."

== Reception ==
Early versions of Alliance garnered very favorable responses from several video game publications, including GameSpot's "Best of E3 (Sequels)" award in 1998 and IGN PC's "Best Action Game of E3" award in 2000. GameSpy called it "the most ambitious game we've seen at E3" and "the pinnacle of tactical gaming, a new high-water mark that'll bust through established game genres," and PC Zone called it "a serious contender for 'game of the year'" in 2000.

== See also ==
- The Dreamland Chronicles: Freedom Ridge
- XCOM, a first-person shooter game that was later turned into third-person tactical shooter The Bureau: XCOM Declassified
