= UFO: Aftermath =

2003 video game

- Developer: ALTAR Interactive
- Publishers: EU: Cenega Publishing; NA: Tri Synergy
- Producer: Radim Křivánek
- Designers: Martin Klíma; Tomáš Kučerovský
- Programmer: Tomáš Hlucháň
- Artist: Radim Pech
- Platform: Microsoft Windows
- Release: UK: October 3, 2003; NA: October 23, 2003
- Genres: Real-time tactics Turn-based strategy
- Mode: Single-player

UFO: Aftermath is a 2003 real-time tactics/turn-based strategy video game created by ALTAR Interactive. It is a homage to the X-COM game series, with roots in the unfinished game The Dreamland Chronicles: Freedom Ridge. It was followed by two sequels, UFO: Aftershock (2005) and UFO: Afterlight (2007).

The game's concept is similar to the unreleased X-COM: Genesis. The player assumes the role of commander of the last humans left on Earth and guides the forces through the crisis to eventually overcome the alien threat. UFO: Aftermath combines global strategy with tactical missions, including an RPG-style approach to each soldier's attributes and skills.

== Gameplay ==
A screenshot of the battle mode; a group of seven soldiers in an urban mission area.

Rooted deeply in the X-COM series, the game combines elements of strategy with squad-based tactics. The game consists of two alternating phases: a strategy phase in which players control and expand their organization, and a tactical phase in which player-controlled units battle alien enemies.

The strategic phase allows players to equip and train their troopers for action, acquire new equipment and personnel, send fighter planes to intercept UFOs, and conduct research to enable the production of more advanced equipment. Mission markers pop up on the globe, indicating locations where a team can be dispatched to battle. Players may expand their territory by capturing bases, allowing more access to resources. Initially, each base can be freely changed to a military, research, or engineering base to suit the player's needs. As the game progresses, the player will also have to contend with ever-growing bodies of biomass that will consume their bases and must be stopped with specialized anti-biomass bases.

The tactical phase plays out in real-time combat. All combatants move and act simultaneously, rather than using turns. Players can pause time or have the game set to automatically pause on certain events and issue orders to their troopers. In a deviation from the X-COM series, the battlefield is presented in fully rotatable 3D view.

== Plot ==
In May 2004, a giant spacecraft approached Earth. Hovering over the planet and ignoring all human attempts at contact, it released large clouds of spores into the upper atmosphere. Rapidly multiplying, the spores soon darkened the skies, obscuring the sun completely. This period became known as the "Twilight".

After having reached critical mass in the skies, the spores began to rain down, clogging the streets and bodies of water, smothering people in their homes and burying animals in the wild. During the "Nightfall", as it would come to be called, most of the higher life forms on earth were wiped out. During these events, all human responses were futile. The governments of the world chose caution over aggression, not realizing how quickly the end could come, and were buried. However, a few survivors sealed themselves in underground bases with stocks of food and oxygen. After several weeks, the spores seemed to disintegrate, decomposing and settling into the soil.

In January 2005, some of the survivors of the Nightfall establish the Council of Earth to reunite the remnants of humanity. The player, the commander of the council's military operations, must gather together the remaining peoples of the planet, find out what has happened, and, if possible, take vengeance. At first, the enemies the player fights are mostly various hostile lifeforms mutated by the spores known as Transgenants. Eventually, however, they begin to fight the true threat of the game, that being an alien species heavily based on the Greys.

Throughout this conflict, large concentrations of biomass begin to envelop landmasses due to spores spread by certain UFOs. The Council discovers several abandoned secret military bases like Area 51 guarded by alien forces, and the player's soldiers recover several documents related to something known as "Project Dreamland" from each. Research into the files reveals more information on the aliens, which are known as the Reticulans. They also reveal that the governments of the world were in contact with a group of peaceful Reticulans who explain that the other Reticulans that have been encountered are part of a rogue faction of their race. These friendly Reticulans join the war effort against their hostile brethren.

After enough research is made into the purpose of the biomass, the rogue Reticulans send a message to the Council and confirms what humanity concluded: They are using the biomass to transform the planet into a living god. Having gained a level of respect for mankind, they extend a one-time offer to humanity that will save them from the biomass, secure their future, and share control of the planetary god- all at the cost of abandoning Earth. The player must choose whether to accept or decline the offer.

If they accept, the Reticulans help the best and brightest of humanity evacuate from Earth, leaving behind the other humans and the planet to become fully engulfed in the biomass. This is the canonical ending of the game that leads to the events of the sequels.

Alternatively, if the player rejects the Reticulans' offer, the war continues until they discover the alien base on Earth's moon. They must then create a spacecraft to get them to the moon for the final mission, in which an assault is launched on the moon base. If the mission is a success, the Reticulans are defeated and the biomass disappears, allowing humanity to rebuild and restore their planet.

== Development and release ==
Originally, the game began as an abortive project titled The Dreamland Chronicles: Freedom Ridge by the British company Mythos Games, headed by the original creator of the X-COM series, Julian Gollop. Following the bankruptcy of Mythos, the unfinished game was bought from Virgin Interactive by the Czech company Altar Interactive in 2002. However, disappointed with the state of development, and finding themselves unable to simply complete it, Altar soon decided to restart it almost completely, retaining only some of the original project's core concepts and ideas but practically none of its actual assets, featuring a completely different combat system and a largely new story. Even the game's title changed, first to UFO: Freedom Ridge and finally to UFO: Aftermath.

== Reception ==
UFO: Aftermath

Aggregate scores
Aggregator	Score
GameRankings	71.29%
Metacritic	67/100

Review scores
Publication	Score
GameSpot	6.4/10
GameSpy	2/5
IGN	7.5/10

UFO: Aftermath received middling reviews. GameSpot gave it 6.4 out of 10 for some simplified and missing features, previously seen in X-COM, that would have allowed for more in-depth gameplay. IGN gave it 7.5 (Good), criticizing simplicity and lack of some features from the X-COM series. GameSpy noted: "Cons: Bad AI and pathfinding; repetitive missions; shallow strategic gameplay; persistent inventory bugs," but praised some parts of the game.

== Legacy ==
Both official and third-party tools exist to help modding UFO: Aftermath. In order to encourage user mods, the publisher held an official contest, resulting in mods affecting many aspects of the game, including skins, weapon models, and characters. The tools are also compatible with the first sequel, UFO: Aftershock. The third sequel, UFO: Afterlight, will not accept modded content or added content because of changes in its engine.
