= Offensive Combat =

Offensive Combat: Redux!
- Steam digital banner art
- Developer: ThreeGates AB
- Publishers: SlapShot Games, LLC
- Engine: Unity
- Platform: Microsoft Windows
- Release: Europe: August 18, 2017 North America; August 18, 2017 Latin America: September 2, 2017
- Genre: First-person shooter
- Modes: Multiplayer, Single-player video game

Offensive Combat was a multiplayer online first-person shooter developed by U4iA Games for mobile and browsers.

A remake known as Offensive Combat: Redux! was developed by ThreeGates and published by SlapShot Games, and was released for Microsoft Windows on Steam in Europe and North America on August 18, 2017. The game was launched in Latin America on September 2, 2017.

== Gameplay ==
Offensive Combat: Redux! is an action game in which up to 16 players compete on a map across three online game modes, Deathmatch, Team Deathmatch, and Capture the Flag. It also features three single player modes including Map Exploration, a Weapons Range and a mode where players compete against artificial intelligence robots.

== Development ==
Development of Offensive Combat: Redux! for Microsoft Windows PCs was announced on March 22, 2017.

It was announced on April 18, 2017 that the game had been approved to be launched on the Steam platform and that the game would release in summer 2017

ThreeGates and SlapShotGames announced their first game update on August 31, 2017, with a roadmap of additional updates and DLC.

The first DLC was launched on September 18, 2017 with two new maps, Shortest Yard and Last Resort. The second DLC was released October 27, 2017 and featured a Halloween theme, as well as the map Triggermortis. The third DLC was released November 22, 2017 with the map, Painhouse. The fourth DLC update was announced for December 22, 2017 and features a space map named Disasteroids, as well as a holiday themed version of already released map, Probetown.
