= List of PC games (X) =

The following page is an alphabetical section from the list of PC games.

== X ==
Name	Developer	Publisher	Genre(s)	Operating system(s)	Date released
Xargon	Epic MegaGames	Epic MegaGames	Platform	DOS	15 January 1994
X3: Terran Conflict	Egosoft	Egosoft	Space simulation	Microsoft Windows, Linux, macOS	16 October 2008
X-Plane	Laminar Research	Laminar Research	Flight simulator	Microsoft Windows, Linux, macOS	1995
XCOM: Enemy Unknown	Firaxis Games, Feral Interactive	2K Games, Feral Interactive	Turn-based tactics, tactical role-playing	Microsoft Windows, Linux, macOS	9 October 2012
XCOM: Enemy Within	Firaxis Games, Feral Interactive	2K Games, Feral Interactive	Turn-based tactics	Microsoft Windows, Linux, macOS	12 November 2013
Xenonauts	Goldhawk Interactive	Goldhawk Interactive	Turn-based tactics	Microsoft Windows, Linux, macOS	17 June 2014
XIII	Ubisoft Paris	Ubisoft	First-person shooter	Microsoft Windows, macOS	18 November 2003
