= Redboss =

Czech mobile game developer

- Industry: Video games
- Headquarters: Czech Republic

Redboss is a distributor and developer of mobile phone games in the Czech Republic. It was a brand of the Czech company MLiven.

Games developed and/or published by the company include UFO: Aftershock by Altar Interactive, Slide-a-lama, Strategy War, BeachWars and Train Tycoon by Chris Sawyer. The company has also cooperated with ICQ since 2005 on game publishing on several mobile games projects, including Slide-a-Lama Deluxe, Zoopaloola, Rock Paper Scissors Mobile, Warsheeps and ICQ Solitaire.
