= Bannercatch =

- Developer: Tom Snyder Productions
- Publisher: Scholastic
- Platforms: Apple II, Atari 8-bit, Commodore 64, IBM PC
- Release: 1984
- Genres: Educational, action

Bannercatch is a video game version of Capture the flag published by Scholastic in 1984 for the Apple II and Commodore 64. An edutainment game, Bannercatch allows up to two players (each alternating between two characters in the game world) to compete against a team of four computer-controlled robots.

== Gameplay ==
Gameplay screenshot (Atari 8-bit)

The main playing field of Bannercatch is divided into four quadrants: one for each team (players and computer), and two neutral quadrants which hold the jails. Each team's flag is initially located within their own quadrant, and can be captured if a member of the opposing team touches it. Participants can be tagged and sent to their team's jail while in the opposing team's quadrant, or in a neutral quadrant while carrying a flag. Participants in jail can only be released if a teammate finds them. If a flag carrier is tagged, the flag is placed at that location. The game map also includes trees, a moving river, a perimeter wall, and uncharted territory, enabling a wide variety of strategies. Special locations enable the players to question Max, the commander of the computer-controlled team, and gain information on the game state (such as flag locations) by using binary code.

Both teams score points by performing actions such as capturing flags and tagging opponents. The first team to capture the opponents' flag and carry it into their own quadrant wins the round. Portions of Max's face are revealed or covered up based on the margin of victory for the players or the computer, respectively.

The game consists of five difficulty levels. Once the players have achieved a three-victory lead over the computer at the current level, they advance to the next one. The ultimate goal is to reveal all of Max's face.

== Reception ==
Phil Seyer for Antic said "The action can be quite exciting as you try to elude Max's robots or chase them when they steal your flag."

Tan A. Summers for Family Computing said "Bannercatch's best lesson may be the wonderful "Aha!" feeling that's a part of the discovery that occurs as you play it."

InfoWorld's Essential Guide to Atari said "Earning points for tagging, capturing and winning are a lot of fun, but learning the skills involved in cooperation and teamwork are applicable skills in every facet of life."
