= Chaika (camera) =

Series of Soviet 35mm half-frame cameras

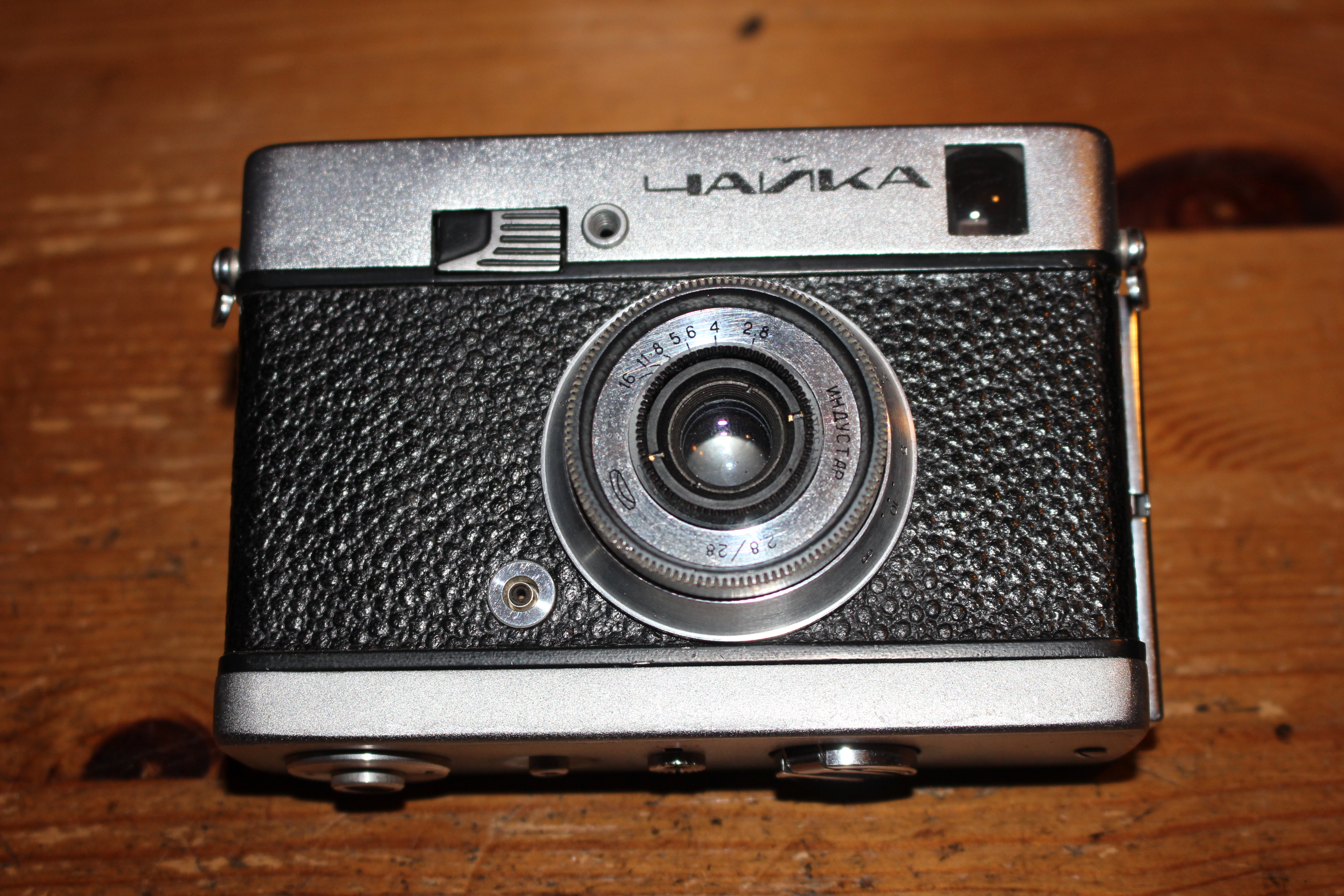
Early Chaika half-frame 35mm camera with fixed 28mm non-removable lens

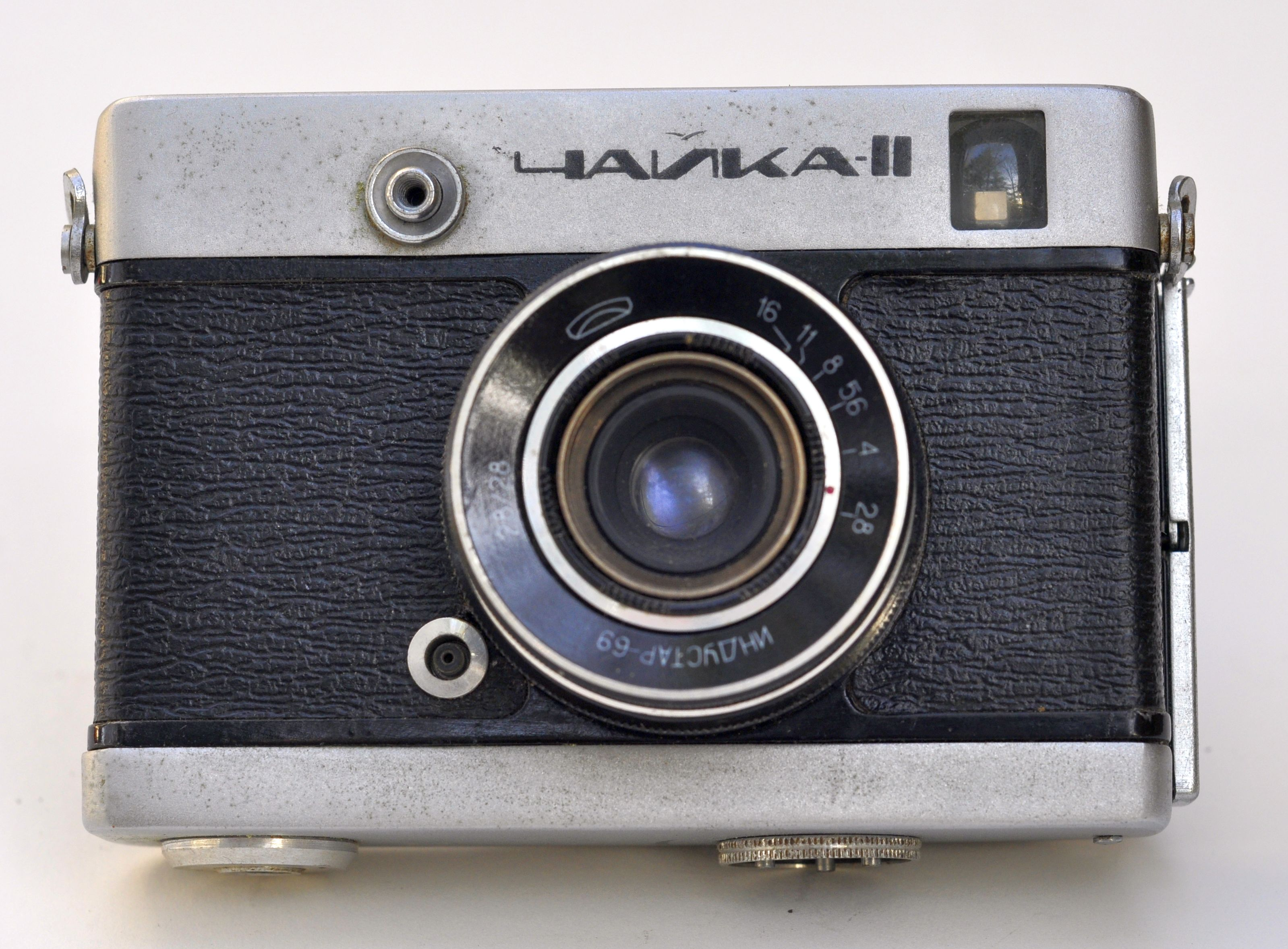
Chaika 2

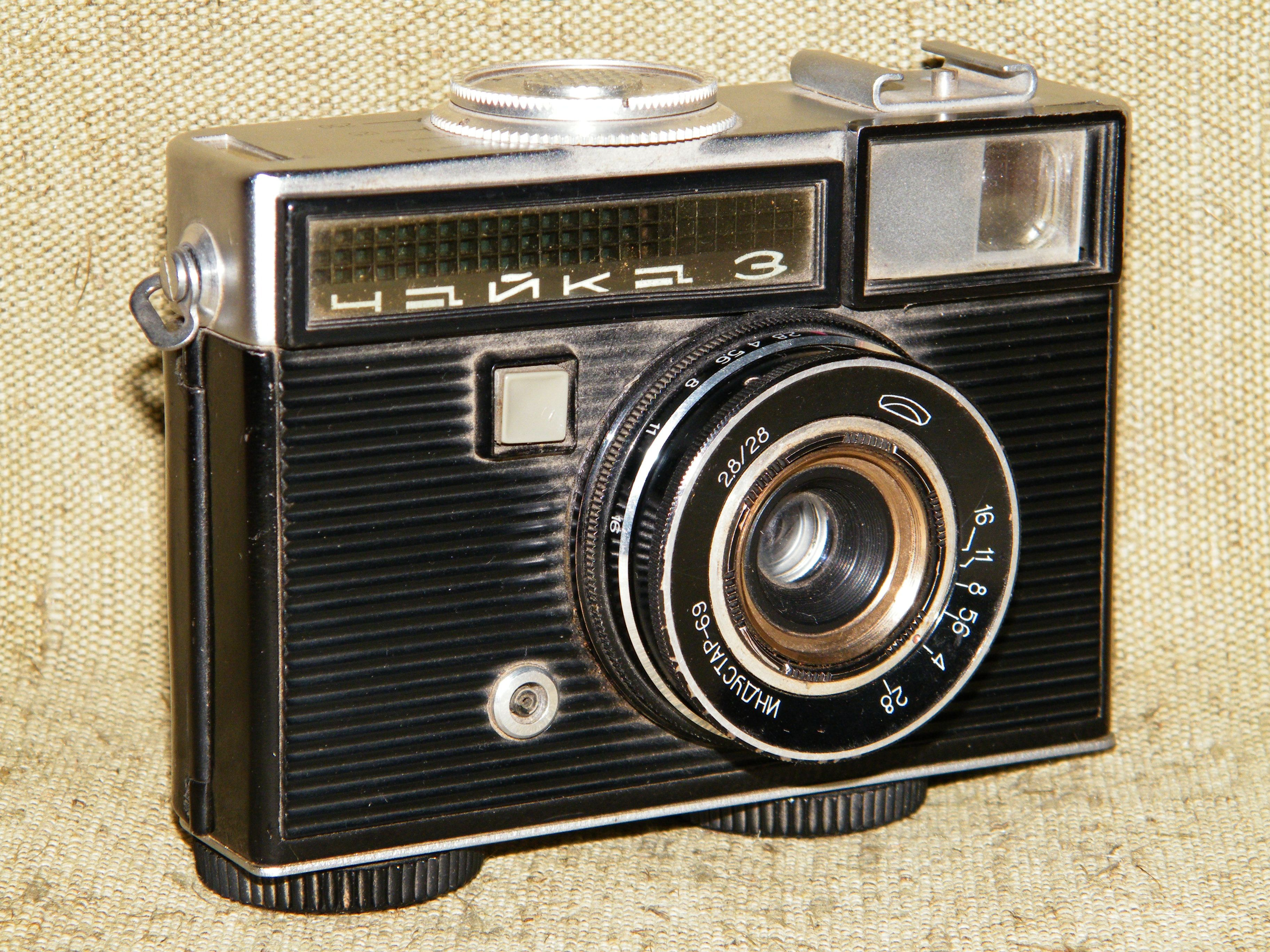
Chaika-3

Chaika (Russian: Чайка) was a series of Soviet 35mm half-frame cameras produced by BELOMO from 1965 to 1974. The name came from call sign of the first woman in space - Valentina Tereshkova. Over 2 million Chaika cameras were produced. All models of the Chaika cameras have metal cases.

Chaika cameras share the following basic specifications:

- Film used — 35-mm in standard cassette (135 type)
- Frame size — 18×24 mm
- Lens — Industar-69 (Tessar-type). This was a fixed lens (and some did not show the -69 suffix) on the original model, screw-in with an LTM-like thread of 39 mm diameter on later versions.
- Focal length 28 mm
- Diaphragm scale from 2.8 to 16
- Focusing: 0.8 m to infinite
- Leaf shutter ... behind the lens
- Adjustable shutter speeds 1/30 - 1/250 sec and "B"
- Flash synchronisation

Flange focal distance for the removable lenses was shorter than the standard M39 mount used by early Leica and compatible cameras - 27.5mm compared to 28.8mm for Leica - and the lens will not focus to infinity on such bodies. The intention was to use the lens to enlarge the negatives, not interchangeability with other cameras or lenses. Lenses designed for Leica-compatible rangefinder cameras will not focus to infinity if fitted to a Chaika body, even if a spacer is used to correct flange focal distance, since the space behind the lens is limited and insufficient for the rangefinder coupling which protrudes beyond the rear of the lens at infinity.

== Camera models ==
- Chaika (1965-1967)
- Chaika-2 (1967-1972)
- Chaika-2M (1972-1974)
- Chaika-3 (1971-1973) with selenium lightmeter and without "B" speed
