= Fugitive (game) =

Outdoor game

Fugitive is an outdoor game combining elements of capture the flag, cops and robbers and sharks and minnows. The game is also comparable to orienteering, fox hunting and other over-land race games.

== Game basics ==
There are two teams. Nomenclature may vary regionally; One team, sometimes called the "Fugitives", are the players who need to race from one point to another; and the second team, sometimes known as the "Police", are the players who need to find and Tag the fugitives before they arrive at their destination.

The fugitives' objective is to run from a starting point to a finishing point without being tagged by any of the police. This finishing point may be a short distance, or depending on the agreed rules, may be many miles away. Depending on ground rules agreed by the players, the fugitives are allowed a head start. The fugitive must remain on foot, no vehicles or alternate modes of transportation are allowed. There are no formal boundaries as to where the fugitive may go; however common sense, personal safety, traffic laws, and trespassing laws should be considered. Stealth, speed, and cardiovascular endurance are all high value skills for the fugitives. Creativity, communication, and attentiveness are all high value skills for the police.

The Police may typically use cell phones or walkie-talkies to plan their pursuit. The police try to "tag" the fugitives. Depending on agreed ground rules, tagging may be done visually with a flashlight, vocally by calling their name or yelling out their position, or physically by touching them. In some games, if a fugitive is caught before the safe zone surrounding the finish point, they become a police informant, making the game more difficult for the remaining fugitives. Other times, the tagged fugitives may be shuttled to the finish point to wait for the game to end (if the police have no room in their car, they may still have to continue on foot).

If a time limit is being used, all remaining fugitives are considered busted once it is up. Once the whole group of players has convened, a new route is chosen, and another game may begin from the finish point.

Ground rules for tagging method (by hand, by flashlight, or by name), head start time for the fugitives, other fair-play rules for the fugitives and police (covering the use of communications, or of vehicles), and most importantly the start/end locations, are agreed before the game begins.
