= UFO: Aftershock =

2005 video game

- Developer: Altar Interactive
- Publishers: EU: Cenega Publishing; NA: Tri Synergy
- Producer: Martin Klíma
- Designers: Lukáš Veselý; Vojtěch Vild
- Programmer: Michal Světlý
- Artists: Radim Pech; David Zapletal; Zdeněk Vespalec
- Writer: David Ellis
- Platform: Microsoft Windows
- Release: EU: October 21, 2005; NA: November 23, 2005
- Genres: Real-time tactics Strategy video game
- Mode: Single-player

UFO: Aftershock is a real-time tactics/strategy video game developed by Altar Interactive and released by Cenega Publishing in Europe and Tri Synergy in North America in 2005. It is a squad combat game at its core with overlying strategic elements inspired by the 1994 classic UFO: Enemy Unknown, though less than its own 2004 predecessor, UFO: Aftermath. It was followed by UFO: Afterlight in 2007.

== Gameplay ==
The combat section of the game uses a real-time system with adjustable speed along with a pause option, and it has been improved from the previous game, with added features such as multilevel battlefields and accessible buildings, but also lacks some previous features, such as destructible terrain. The strategic section holds resource and squad management, research, development, some limited diplomacy and planning of attacks. As a departure from both the X-COM series and the prequel, there is no air-to-air interception.

== Plot ==
Aftershock is set in a post-apocalyptic 2050, after the events of UFO: Aftermath. The game assumes that the player took up the Reticulans offer of resettling the most able of humanity in a space station, while allowing the rest to die, consumed by the Biomass that the Reticulans could not control. (However, in the first game the player could reject their offer, and save the Earth while defending against both the Reticulans and the Biomass.) Having lost contact with the Earth, the player must find out what happened.

== Development and release ==
UFO: Aftershock was released in Europe on 21 October 2005 and in North America on 23 November 2005. It is protected by the controversial StarForce copy protection software on all store sold copies of the game. It was re-released by GOG.com, a digital distribution game retailer, without any copy protection.

An Xbox version was planned for release in Europe but cancelled. The publisher granted a license to the Czech company Redboss Games, a subsidiary of Redboss, which they used to create a mobile version of UFO: Aftershock.

== Reception ==
The game received mixed critical reviews upon release. It is notoriously buggy even after several released patches.

== Sequel ==
A sequel and third game in the series was released two years after Aftershock, titled UFO: Afterlight, to execute the same concept on Mars.
