= X-COM (email games) =

- Cover (with Portuguese distribution stickers)
- Developer: MicroProse
- Publisher: Hasbro Interactive
- Series: X-COM
- Platform: Windows
- Release: NA: September 30, 1999; UK: November 5, 1999
- Genre: Turn-based strategy
- Mode: Multiplayer

X-COM (also X-COM: First Alien Invasion) was part of a budget range video game series released in 1999 by Hasbro Interactive for Microsoft Windows that relied solely on the play-by-mail concept.

== Overview ==
X-COM has 50 maps (10 for each setting - Urban, UFO, Ice, X-COM Base and Alien Base). On each map there are a number of crates containing powerups (such as doubling the action points, damage or range of a unit for a turn, reveal the complete map for the same turn, instantly heal the unit, or provide a shield, landmine or grenades), but also hazards such as mines and traps or teleports. Like the older games, there are also explosive barrels; shooting a barrel and managing to explode it will damage and potentially kill all units nearby.

Unit and weapon design is based on the first game of the series, UFO-Enemy Unknown, except the human flame-thrower and sniper's rifle and the alien helium thrower (the manual states the game has "a wide variety of weapons all from the year 2001", while UFO-EU starts in 1999). Each unit is tied to a weapon; it isn't possible, for instance, to equip a Commander with a rocket launcher instead of the sniper's rifle.

The game is played in a simplified logic of the older games: each unit "life" is measured by hit points and can only move a certain number of squares depending on their action points. They can either shoot, move, or move but losing an action point for an opportunity shot—the unit will fire at any enemy unit that crosses its sights (this is only available for lighter weapons). Each weapon also has its own damage rating and range.

After all enemy units were killed, the winner would have their final score calculated from movements, stealth, firepower and bravery displayed in combat—one could win, but if in a clumsy and lucky way, a "Terrible" score was possible.

When Hasbro Interactive ceased operations, so did the e-mail servers.

== See also ==
- X-COM
