= BelOMO =

Belarusian producer of optoelectronic instruments

Coordinates: 53°55′1″N 27°37′17″E

BelOMA
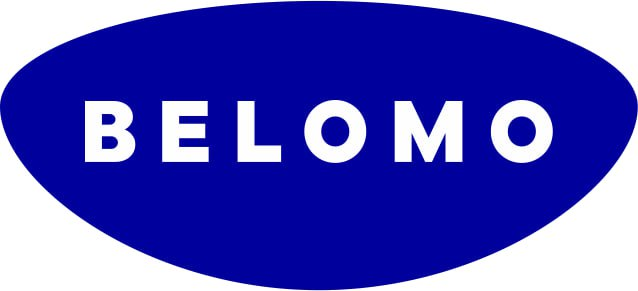
- Company type: open joint-stock company
- Industry: instrumentation engineering
- Founded: July 15, 1954; 71 years ago in Minsk
- Founder: Defence Ministry of the USSR
- Headquarters: Minsk, Belarus
- Area served: 30 countries
- Key people: Aliaksandr Ivanavich Maroz
- Products: electronics
- Owner: Ministry of Industry of Belarus
- Number of employees: 2597 (2017)
- Parent: Ministry of Industry of Belarus
- Website: belomo.by/en/

BelOMA (Belarus Optical & Mechanical Association; Belarusian: Беларускае оптыка-механічнае аб'яднанне, Bielaruskaye optyka-miehanichnaye ab'yadnannie; Russian: BelOMO or Belorusskoe Optiko-Mechanichesckoye Obyedinenie - Беломо or Белорусское оптико-механическое объединение) is the leading optoelectronic device producer in Belarus, founded in 1954 as the Minsk Mechanical Factory.

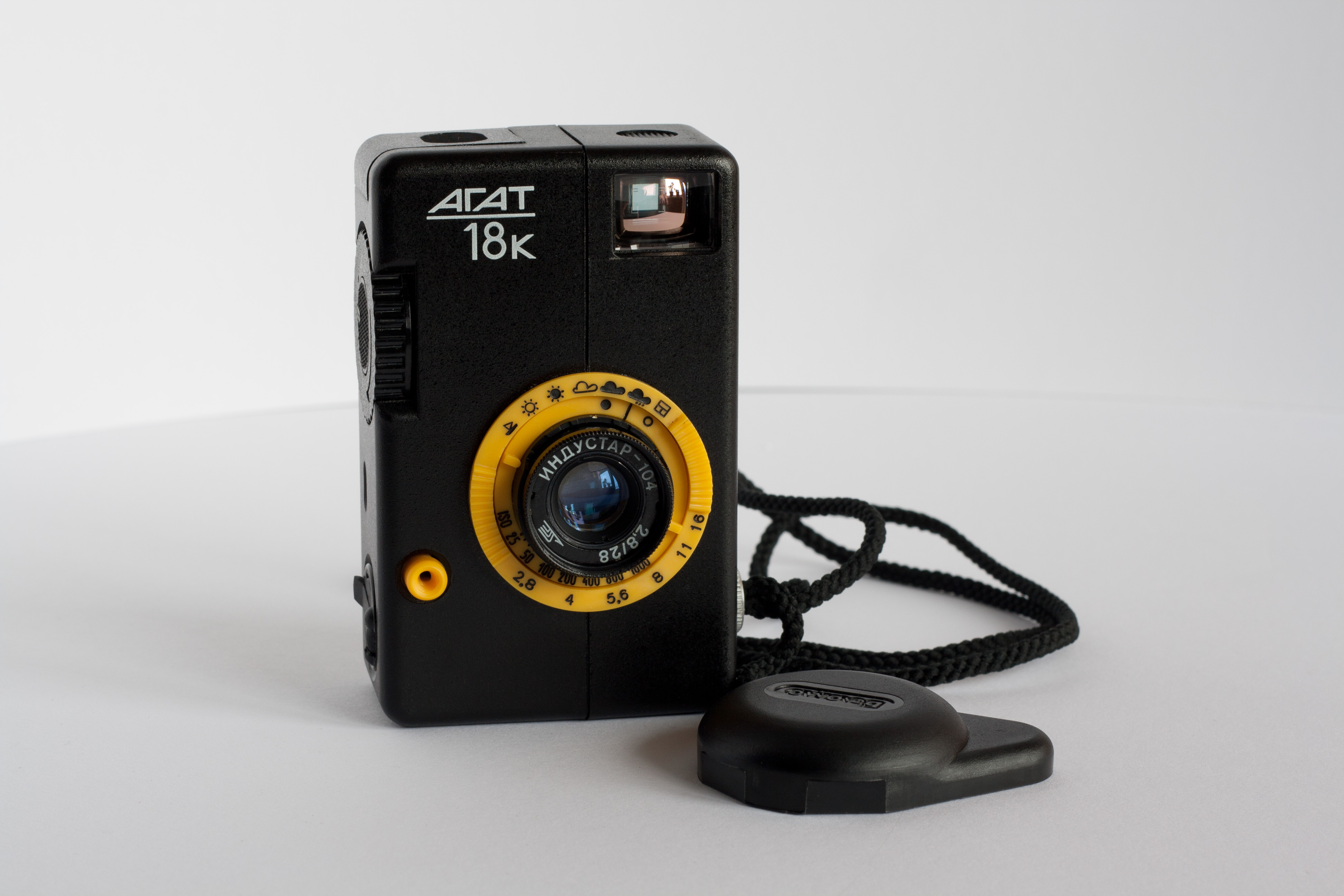
Agat-18k half-frame camera made by BelOMO

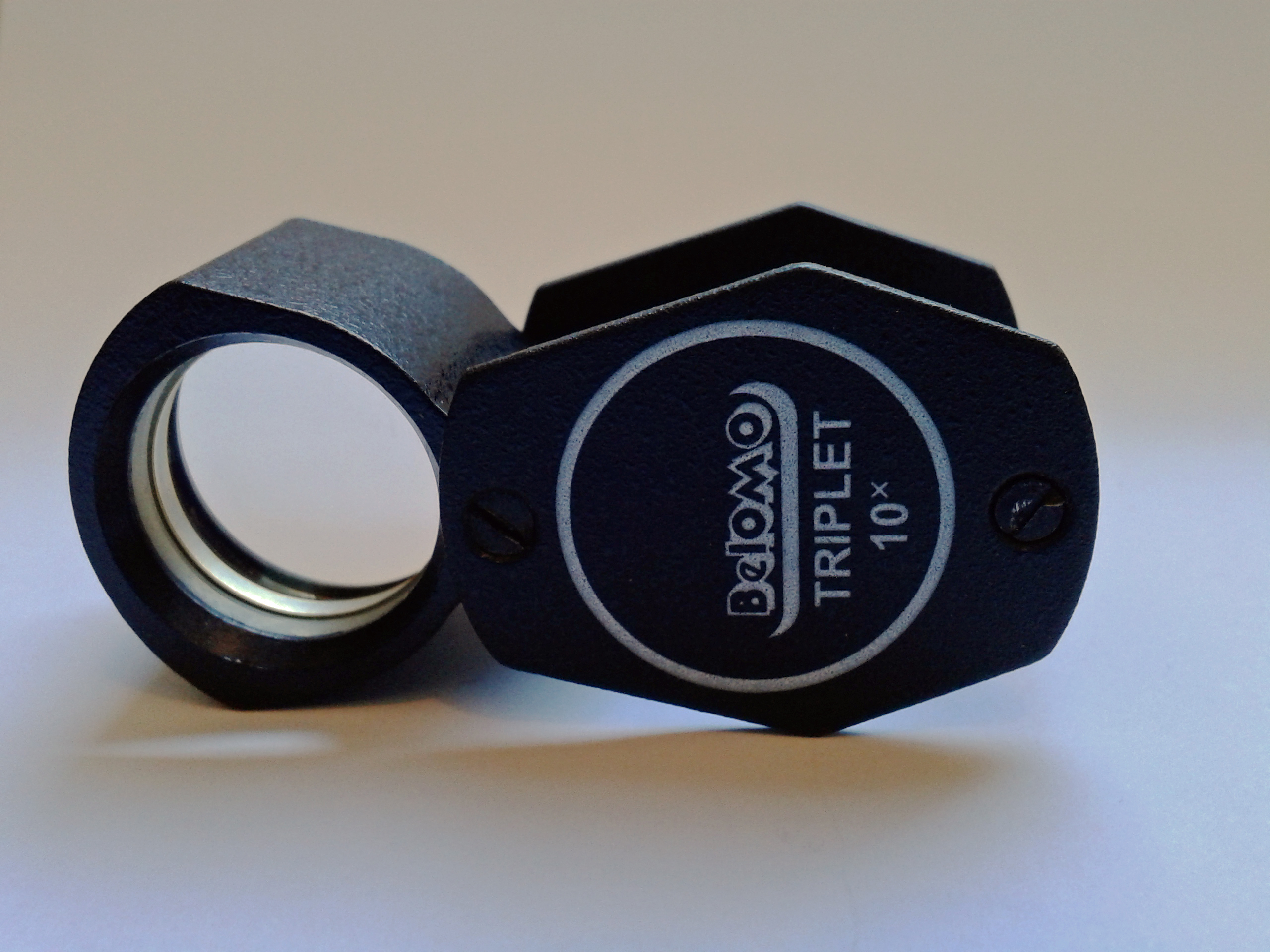
BelOMO 10× achromatic triplet loupe

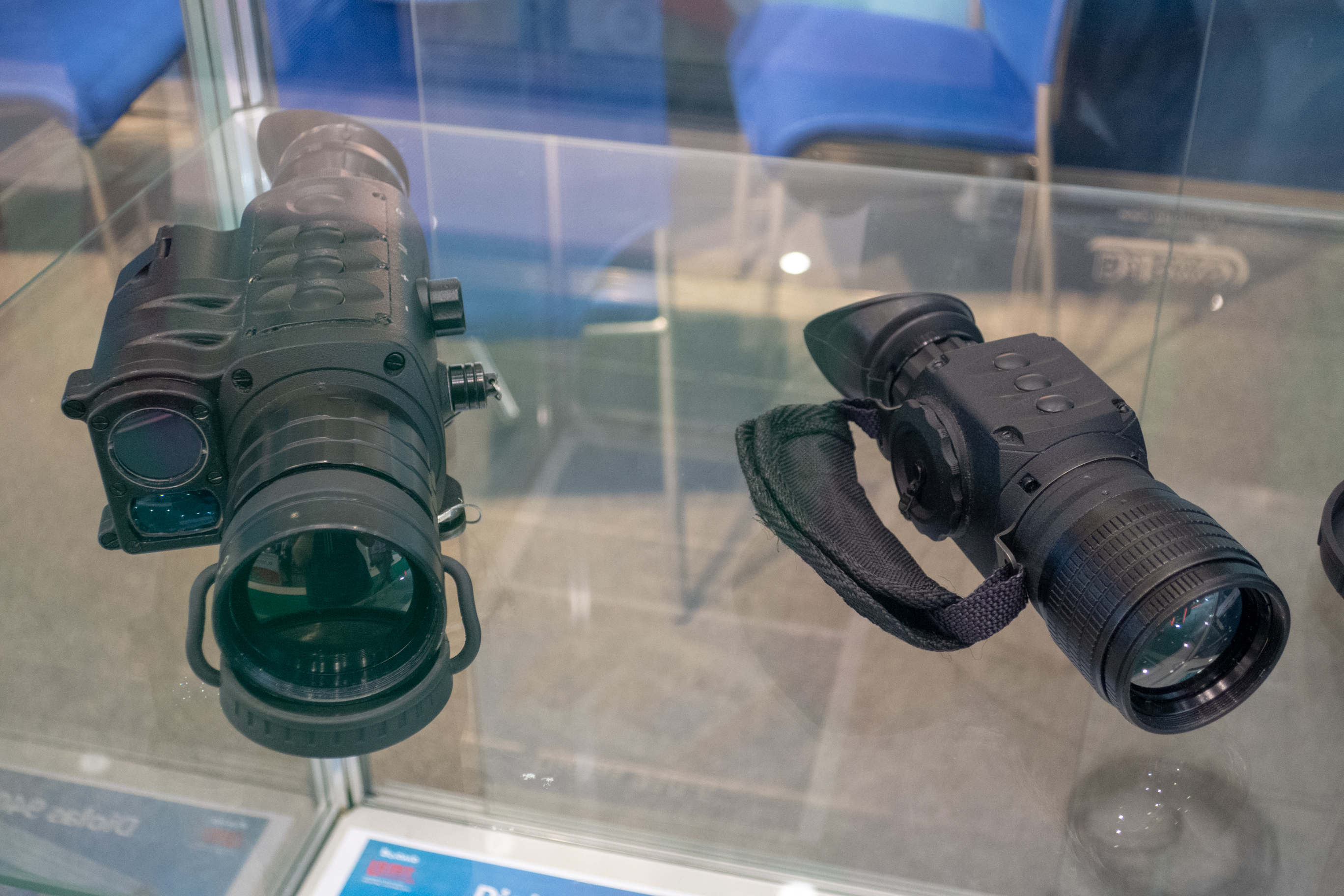
Thermal vision sights

The main factory opened in Minsk 1957 and was named after the Soviet physicist Sergey Ivanovich Vavilov (1891–1951). At first, BelOMA made photographic equipment and lens-making machinery for state use. It now manufactures a wide range of products, including military and consumer optical products. During the 1980s it produced the Agat-18 and Agat-18K half-frame 35mm cameras, still popular among Lomographic photographers.

A joint venture with German optics maker Zeiss was begun in 1995 and ended 2023/24. The firm produces lenses and optical elements for microscopes and other optical equipment with ISO 9001 certification.

MMZ—BelOMA factory estimates its global market share in optical sights, rangefinders and NVDs at 2-3%, with 10% of Russian market and 80% of local market. The factory also produces gas meters, car units, infra-red emitters, juicers and other civil products.

== International sanctions ==
In 2022, BelOMA was blacklisted by the European Union, the US, Switzerland and Japan, in response to Belarus's enabling of and support for the Russian invasion of Ukraine.

In May 2023, Ukraine imposed sanctions against several BelOMO subsidiaries On July 1, 2023, Ukraine further blacklisted the CEO of BelOMA Alexander Moroz, the director of the STC "LEMT" Alexey Shkadarevich and several enterprises of the association. In August 2023, BelOMA was also blacklisted by Canada and the United Kingdom. On December 5, 2023, the United States Department of the Treasury’s Office of Foreign Assets Control has added BelOMO, LEMT BelOMA and Zenit BelOMA, another BelOMA subsidiary, as well as their directors general, Moroz, Shkadarevich and Gaichuk, to its Specially Designated Nationals and Blocked Persons List.

In April 2024, Dzmitry Mikhaltsou, the technical director of the Vavilov Plant, was also added to the SDN list. In June 2024, BelOMO, Moroz, LEMT BelOMO and JSC Zenit BelOMA were added to the European Union's sanctions list. In July, Switzerland, Albania, Bosnia and Herzegovina, Iceland, Liechtenstein, Moldova, Montenegro, North Macedonia, Norway, Ukraine joined these sanctions; New Zealand blacklisted BelOMA and Moroz in September. On August 23, 2024, the United States announced sanctions against yet another BelOMA subsidiary, the Diaproektor plant, as well as its director and two deputy directors.

Following sanctions, BelOMA has obtained parts and supplies from several Chinese companies.

== Camera models ==
- Agat-18
- Agat-18K
- Chaika
- Elikon-35CM
- Vilia
