= Capture the flag =

Traditional outdoor sport

Capture the Flag
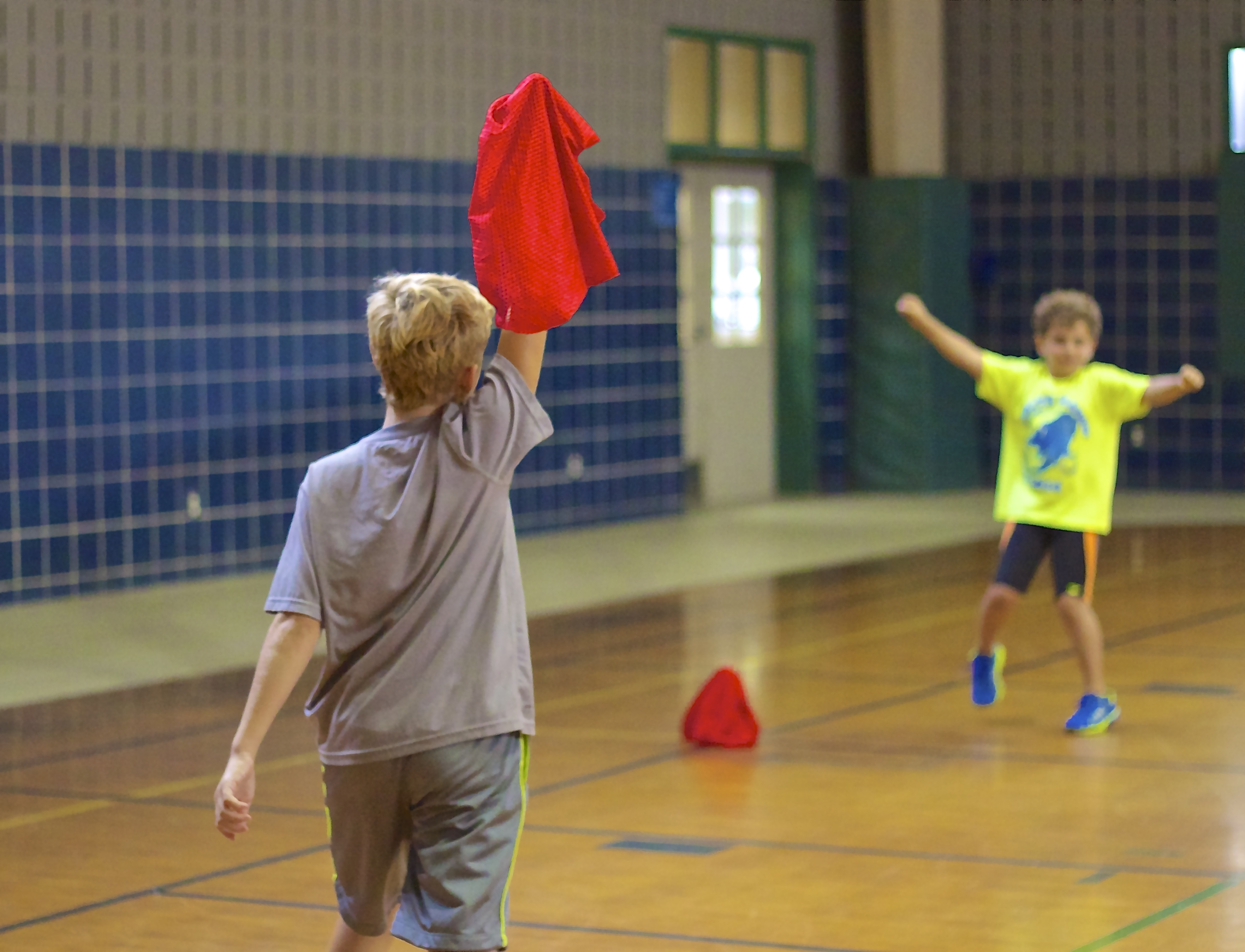
- An indoor game of capture the flag at the Bellaire Recreation Center's All Sports Camp in Bellaire, Texas in August 2014
- Players: Large group, more than six players in a team
- Playing time: 10–30 minutes
- Skills: endurance; observation; strategy; speed; stealth
- Synonyms: CTF

Capture the Flag (CTF) is a traditional outdoor sport where two or more teams each have a flag (or other markers) and the objective is to capture the other team's flag, located at the team's "base" (or hidden or even buried somewhere in the territory), and bring it safely back to their own base. Enemy players can be "tagged" by players when out of their home territory and, depending on the rules, they may be out of the game, become members of the opposite team, be sent back to their own territory, be frozen in place, or be sent to "jail" until freed by a member of their own team.

== Overview ==
Capture the Flag requires a playing field. In both indoor and outdoor versions, the field is divided into two clearly designated halves, known as territories. Players form two teams, one for each territory. Each side has a "flag", which is most often a piece of fabric, but can be any object small enough to be easily carried by a person (night time games might use flashlights, glowsticks or lanterns as the "flags"). Sometimes teams wear dark colors at night to make it more difficult for their opponents to see them.

The objective of the game is for players to venture into the opposing team's territory, grab the flag, and return with it to their territory without being tagged. The flag is defended mainly by tagging opposing players who attempt to take it. Within their territory players are "safe", meaning that they cannot be tagged by opposing players. Once they cross into the opposing team's territory they are vulnerable to tagging.

Rules for Capture the Flag appear in 1860 in the German gymnastic manual Lehr- und Handbuch der deutschen Turnkunst by Wilhelm Lübeck under the name Fahnenbarlauf. In the 19th century, Capture the Flag was not considered a distinct game, but a variation of the European game "Barlaufen" (Barlauf mit Fahnenraub), played in France and Germany.

Descriptions of Capture the Flag in English appeared in the early 20th century, e. g. in "Scouting for Boys" written in 1908 by Robert Baden-Powell, the founder of the Scouting Movement, under the title "Flag Raiding". They also appeared in the 1920 Edition of "The Official Handbook for Boys" published by the Boy Scouts of America.

The flag is usually placed in a visibly obvious location at the rear of a team's territory. In a more difficult version, the flag is hidden in a place where it can only be seen from certain angles. Capturing the flag also might require completing some challenge. For example, the flag could be hidden in the leaves up in a tall tree, and the players have to see the flag, then knock it out and bring it to their base.

=== Jail ===
The rules for jail vary from game to game and deal with what happens if a player is tagged in the other team's territory. Either each team can decide a designated area for the other team's players to go to when tagged, or a single jail can be used for both teams. When tagged, a player should be trusted to go to jail on their own, or should need to be escorted, depending on the game. Players can leave the jail after a certain time, for example three minutes, or can leave early if tagged by a teammate. Depending on the game, players can be released on the way to jail, or may have to be in jail before being released.

=== Capturing the flag ===
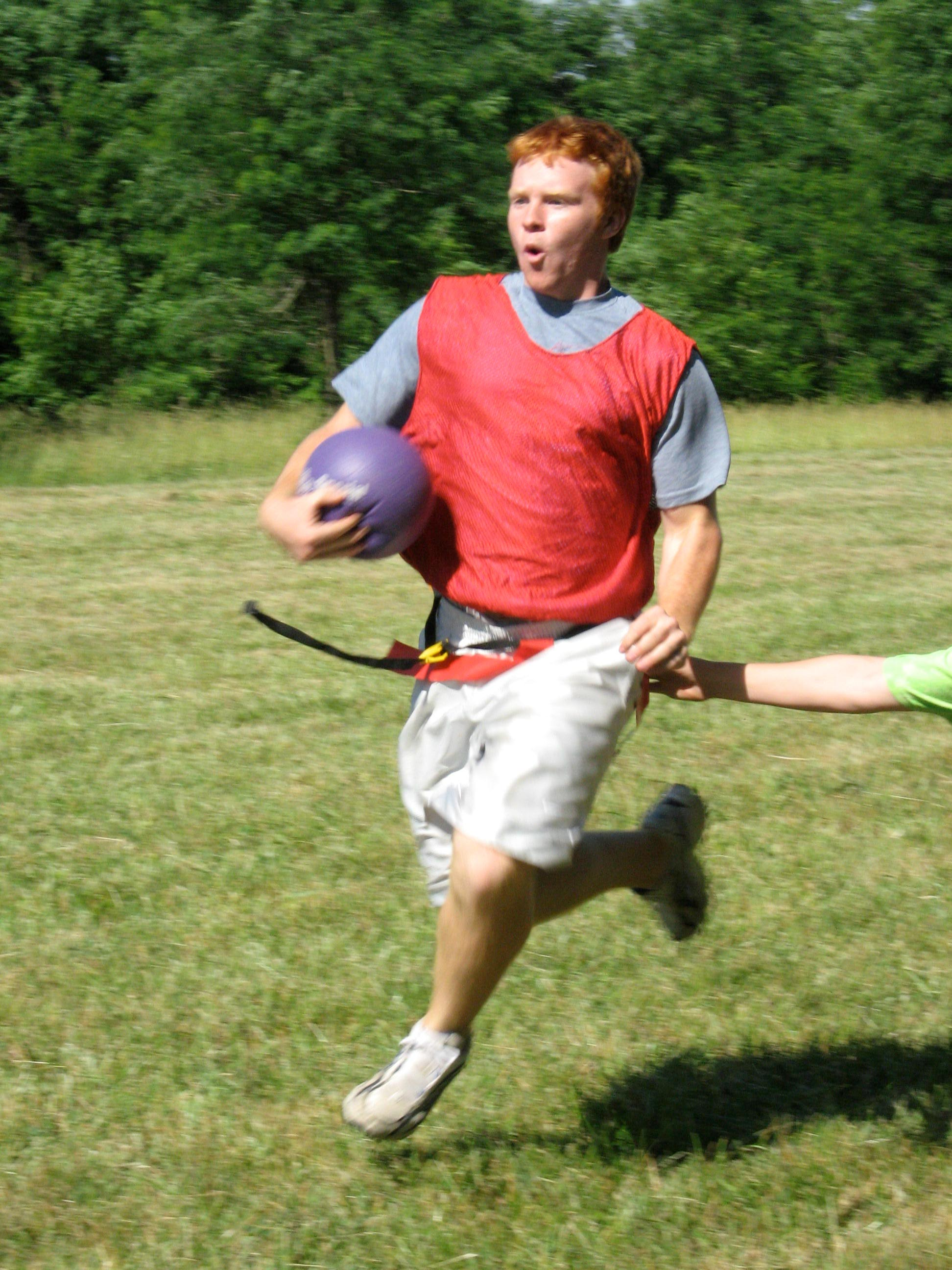
An ECyD member playing a variation of capture the flag, in which the "flag" is a softball, at Camp River Ridge in Indiana

The rules for the handling of the flag also vary from game to game and deal mostly with the disposition of the flag after a failed attempt at capturing it. In one variant, after a player is tagged while carrying the flag, it is returned to its original place. In another variant, the flag is left in the location where the player was tagged. This latter variant makes offensive play easier, as the flag will tend, over the course of the game, to be moved closer to the dividing line between territories. In some games, it is possible for the players to throw the flag to teammates. As long as the flag stays in play without hitting the ground, the players are allowed to pass it.

When the flag is captured by one player, they're not safe from being tagged, unless they trip. Sometimes, the flag holder may not be safe at all, even in their home territory, until they obtain both flags, thus ending the game. Their goal is to return to their own side or hand it off to a teammate who will then carry it to the other side. In most versions the flag may be handed off while running. The game is won when a player returns to their own territory with the enemy flag or both teams' flags. Also, rarely the flag carrier may not attempt to free any of their teammates from jail.

=== Variants ===
Alterations may include "one flag" Capture the Flag in which there is a defensive team and an offensive team, or games with three or more flags. In the case of the latter, one can only win when all flags are captured.

Another variation is when the players put bandannas in their pockets with about six inches sticking out. Instead of tagging opponents, players must pull their opponent's bandanna out of their pocket. No matter where a player is when their bandanna is pulled, they're captured and must either go to jail or return to their base before returning to play. In this version there is no team territory, only a small base where the team's flag is kept. To win, one team must have both of the flags in their base.

In some urban settings, the game is played indoors in an enclosed area with walls. There is also an area in the opposing ends for the flag to be placed in. In this urban variation legal checking as in hockey, including against the sideboards, is allowed. A player who commits a foul or illegal check is placed in a penalty box for a specified amount of time, depending on the severity of the foul. A player who deliberately injures an opponent is expelled from the rest of the game. Throwing the flag is allowed in this variation, as long as the flag is caught before it hits the ground. If the flag is thrown to a teammate but hits the ground before it can be caught, the flag is placed from the spot of the throw. If a player throws the flag, but is blocked or intercepted by a player from the opposing team, the flag is placed back at the base.

It is not uncommon for people to play airsoft, paintball, or Nerf variations of Capture the Flag. Typically there are no territories in these versions. Players who are "hit" must sit out a predetermined amount of time before returning to play (respawning).

==== Stealing sticks ====
"Stealing sticks" is a similar game played in the British Isles, the United States, and Australia. However, instead of a flag, a number of sticks or other items such as coats or hats are placed in a "goal" on the far end of each side of the playing field or area. As in Capture the Flag, players are sent to a "prison" if tagged on the opponents' side, and may be freed by teammates. Each player may only take one of their opponents' sticks at a time. The first team to take all of the opponents' sticks to their own side wins.

== Software and games ==
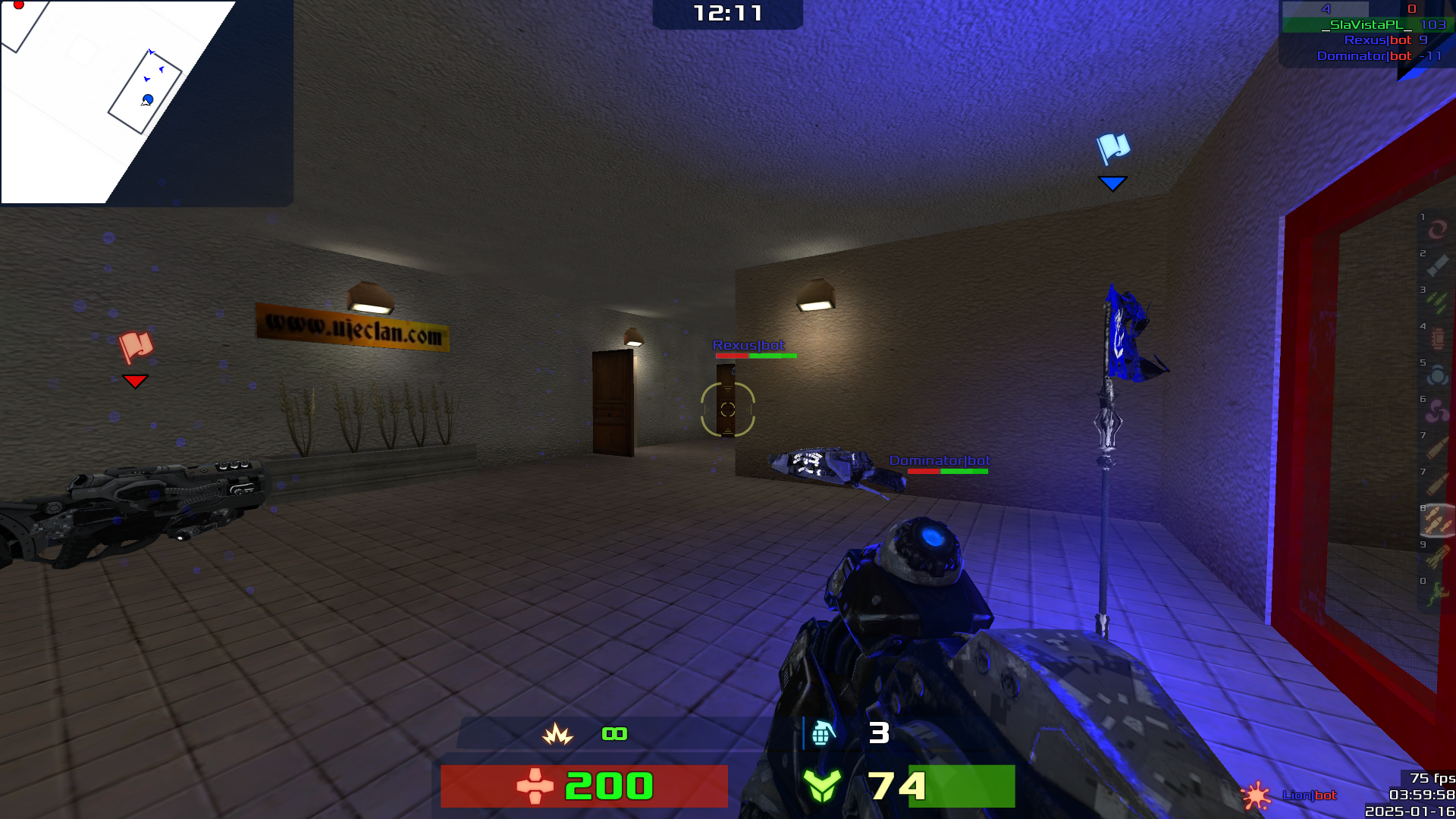
A player standing close to the blue flag in a "capture the flag" round of the 2023 first-person shooter game Xonotic

In 1984, Scholastic published Bannercatch for the Apple II and Commodore 64 computers. An educational video game with recognizable capture-the-flag mechanics, Bannercatch allows up to two humans (each alternating between two characters in the game world) to play capture the flag against an increasingly difficult team of four AI bots. Bannercatch's game world is divided into quadrants: home, enemy, and two "no-mans land" areas which hold the jails. A successful capture requires bringing the enemy flag into one team's "home" quadrant. Players can be captured when in an enemy territory, or in "no-mans land" while holding a flag. Captured players must be "rescued" from their designated jail by one of the other members of the team. Fallen flags remain where they dropped until a time-out period elapses, after which the flag returns to one of several starting locations in home territory. The 2D map also features walls, trees and a moving river, enabling a wide variety of strategies. Special locations in the play area allow humans to query the game state (such as flag status) using binary messages.

In 1992, Richard Carr released an MS-DOS based game called Capture the Flag. It is a turn-based strategy game with real time network / modem play (or play-by-mail) based around the traditional outdoor game. The game required players to merely move one of their characters onto the same square as their opponent's flag, as opposed to bringing it back to friendly territory, because of difficulties implementing the artificial intelligence that the computer player would have needed to bring the enemy flag home and intercept opposing characters carrying the flag.

=== Computer security ===
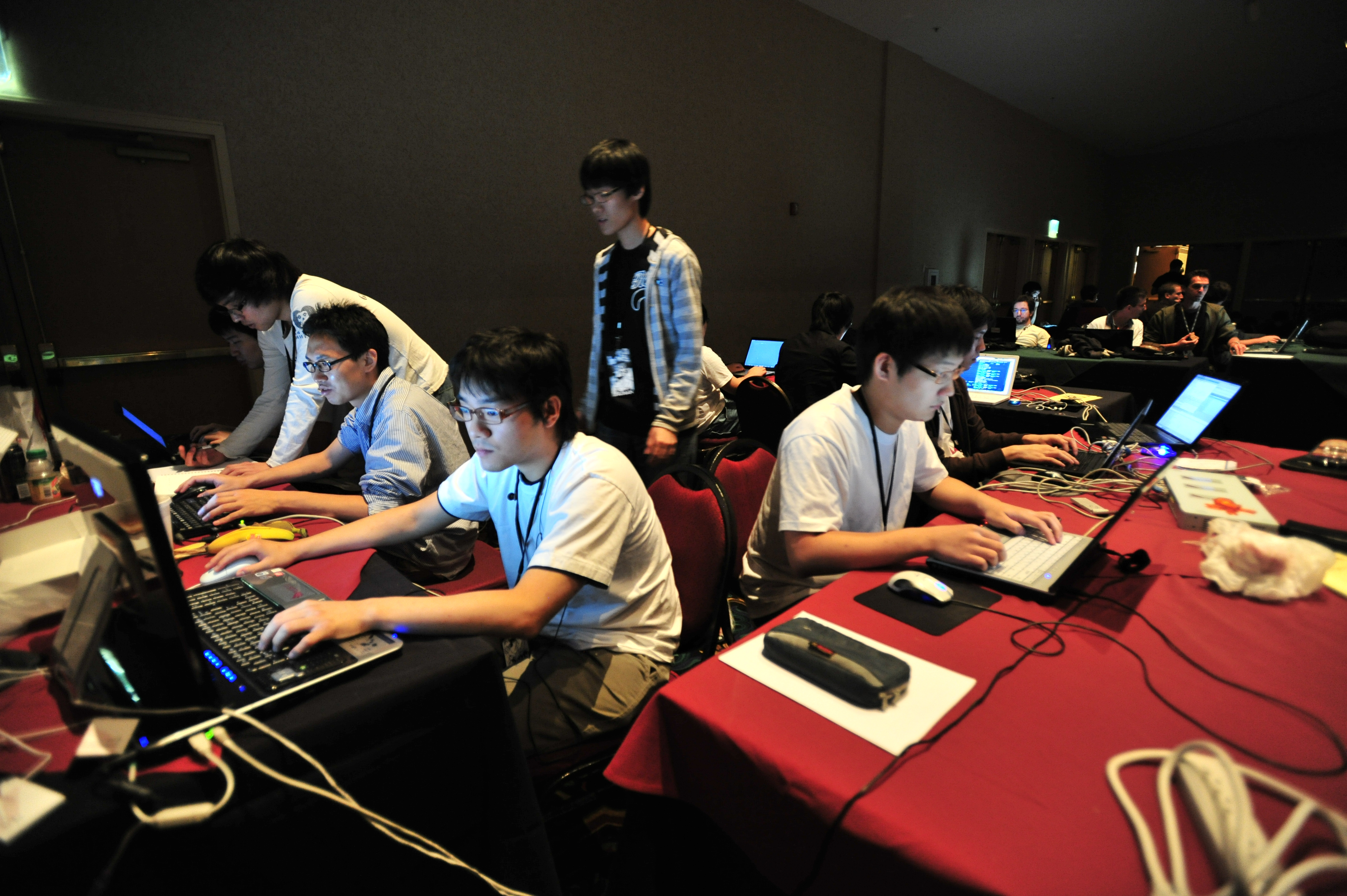
A team competing in the CTF competition at DEF CON 17

In computer security Capture the Flag (CTF), "flags" are secrets hidden in purposefully-vulnerable programs or websites. Competitors steal flags either from other competitors (attack/defense-style CTFs) or from the organizers (jeopardy-style challenges). Several variations exist, including hiding flags in hardware devices.

== Urban gaming ==
Capture the Flag is among the games that made a comeback among adults in the early 21st century as part of the urban gaming trend (which includes games like Pac-Manhattan, Fugitive, Unreal Tournament, Ultimate frisbee, and Manhunt). The game is played on city streets and players use cellphones to communicate. News about the games spreads virally through the use of blogs and mailing lists. Urban Capture the Flag has been played in cities throughout North America. One long-running example occurs on the Northrop Mall at the University of Minnesota on Fridays with typical attendance ranging from 50 to several hundred.

== See also ==
- Darebase
- Kabaddi, a tackling sport
- Fugitive (game)
- Steal the bacon
- Zarnitsa game
