= Manhunt (urban game) =

Variations on the game of tag

Manhunt, sometimes just called hunt, refers to a number of variations of the game of hide-and-seek. The goal is to avoid being tagged by anyone designated as "it" or (for those already "it") to tag anyone who has not been tagged. It is often played in the dark. Some variations include teams and point scoring.

== See also ==
- Ringolevio
