= X-COM: Genesis =

Cancelled video game

- Developer: MicroProse Chapel Hill Studio
- Publisher: Hasbro Interactive
- Designer: Dave Ellis
- Series: X-COM
- Platform: Windows
- Release: Unreleased
- Genre: Strategy
- Mode: Single player

X-COM: Genesis is a cancelled strategy video game in the X-COM series. It was being developed for Windows by the MicroProse Chapel Hill studio, then working for Hasbro Interactive who had bought out MicroProse. Production took place in the original MicroProse offices, and the game was planned "sometime for 2001". X-COM: Genesis was never completed due to the closure of the Chapel Hill MicroProse studio.

== Development ==
The Chapel Hill development team, just after finishing X-COM: Interceptor, had completed converting the original X-COM games from MS-DOS to Windows. Wanting to return to gameplay of the original games, the team began developing a storyline that was conducive to squad-based missions, the highlight of the original games. The creepy atmosphere, frighteningly powerful aliens, base building and research were all allotted for in the new version. Genesis would be a 3D real-time strategy game. The real-time gameplay was tentative—if using it didn't convey the same atmosphere and feel as the original, it would be replaced with a turn-based implementation. As a precaution, the game designer Dave Ellis had provided for a feature where players could easily stop the action and issue commands to their units.

In mid-1999 the team started developing a 3D engine from scratch. The engine used Direct3D to take advantage of hardware acceleration, but also had a software 3D engine for those computers without 3D cards. The team developed a "Geoscape", a view of Earth from orbit, that far surpassed the implementation in previous versions. The original game had a flat-shaded, rather blocky representation of the Earth. Genesis had a smooth globe on a background of stars. With the mouse, the user could turn the Earth and when doing so, could see the Sun and Moon pass by in the background. A translucent covering of clouds swirled above the tranquil blue, green and brown planet surface below. The team built a level editor to allow the artists to build levels for the "Battlescape"—the areas where battles against the alien invaders would take place. The artists created an urban environment with a filling station, warehouse, an apartment building, attached parking garage, a park, a burning trashbin and streetlights that cast pools of light. Floating above it all was a blimp with floodlights streaming earthward. Standing in formation outside their aircraft were the X-COM soldiers, shifting on their feet, looking left to right. Zooming in closely, one could even see their chests huff as they breathed. By simply pointing and clicking, the soldiers could be commanded to move from place to place. All action was in real-time.

Once at this point, the programmers busied themselves adding more features to the engine, refining current features and implementing AI. Meanwhile, Dave Ellis was busy developing the game design and the artists were producing concept art. In the studio's main conference room, one entire wall was covered with original sketches and color treatments of illustrations. The facing wall was covered in colored Post-it notes depicting the player's possible paths through the game. Technology trees, base discoveries and pivotal events were all represented.

The studio was notified of the project's cancellation on December 7, 1999, as part of a range of cuts including several other games and an updated version of Atari, Inc.'s Combat. The Chapel Hill Hasbro Interactive studio was closed on January 7, 2000. The remaining Hasbro Interactive studios were closed shortly thereafter and Hasbro sold their remaining assets to Infogrames (Atari). In 2005, Take-Two Interactive acquired the rights to the X-COM series from Atari. Previous employees of the studio later formed a new studio called Vicious Cycle Software, developing a new 3D engine and a technology demo. Dave Ellis, leveraging contacts at Mattel, arranged for a demonstration of the demo to Mattel's management. Vicious Cycle would go on to make a Robotech game for Mattel to be published for the newly released PlayStation 2 and Xbox.

== See also ==
- X-COM: Alliance
