= Xenonauts =

2014 video game

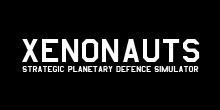
- Storefront logo of Xenonauts
- Developer: Goldhawk Interactive (Note: Ported to OS X and Linux by Knockout Games.)
- Publisher: Goldhawk Interactive
- Designer: Chris England
- Programmers: Sergey Kovrov, Gijs-Jan Roelofs, Laszlo Perneky, Giovanni Frigo
- Composer: Aleksi Aubry-Carlson
- Platforms: Linux; Microsoft Windows; OS X
- Release: Microsoft Windows: WW: June 17, 2014; OS X, Linux: WW: September 29, 2015
- Genres: Strategy, turn-based tactics
- Mode: Single-player

Xenonauts is a turn-based science fiction video game developed and published as the maiden title of London-based independent game studio Goldhawk Interactive. Inspired by the 1994 game UFO: Enemy Unknown, gameplay involves the player taking the role of the commander of a clandestine organization known as the Xenonauts, and attempting to defeat an alien invasion of Earth in the alternative history year 1979. The game was released on June 17, 2014 for Microsoft Windows. Ports to Mac OS X and Linux were initially based on the Wine compatibility layer, until native ports became available in September 2015. A sequel, Xenonauts 2, was released through early access in 2023.

== Gameplay ==
A screenshot of tactical gameplay (alpha version), showing a UFO crashed in a farm

The game utilizes the fundamental mechanics of the early X-COM games, in this case considered to be the real-time global air control and strategic management and research components of the game, coupled with turn-based ground combat where the player controls a squad of soldiers and vehicles against the alien forces. Soldiers can develop their attributes through combat experience. All terrain in the ground combat maps is destructible.

Features advertised by Goldhawk as "enhancements" to the original X-COM model include the following:

- An improved air combat model (in real-time with pause mode) that allows combat between up to three aircraft/UFOs on each side.
- The option to save soldier equipment loadouts between missions, and the ability to change the weapon loadouts of ground vehicles.
- The starting position of infantry and vehicles can be arranged inside the dropship (at first a troop transport helicopter).
- The inclusion of a directional cover system in ground combat.
- Friendly local military and law enforcement NPCs present in ground combat.
- Alternative victory conditions for ground combat missions (other than just simply eliminating all alien forces).

== Plot ==
In an alternate history 1958, an alien UFO enters Earth's atmosphere over Iceland and is immediately hostile to the fighters scrambled to intercept it. The United States and Soviet Union use nuclear missiles to shoot down the UFO, which then self-destructs. The governments of the world realise that a hostile interstellar alien race is too much for any of them to face alone, so the Xenonauts are founded to combat the alien menace if and when it returns.

In November 1979, a huge alien fleet arrives in orbit. Initially, only the smallest UFOs are able to fly in Earth's atmosphere, but the aliens quickly modify their ships to enable incursion by larger vessels. The aliens attack military and civilian targets in an attempt to spread panic and destabilise Earth's defence. While the Xenonauts are successful in shooting down and researching alien craft, weapons and biology, the alien forces in orbit are seemingly endless.

Studying the aliens' biology reveals that they are extremely hierarchical, with the lowest ranked being mindless slaves. Only the highest ranked "Praetors" truly have free will. The Xenonauts implement a two-pronged plan to defeat the alien invasion - they develop and activate a hyperspace inhibition field, which prevents any future alien forces coming to Earth, then infiltrate the alien mothership and assassinate the High Praetor, rendering the entire alien fleet around Earth inactive.

== Development ==
Development of Xenonauts began in 2009. The game was heavily influenced by the X-COM series but is described by the development team as neither a remake nor a clone, but rather a "re-imagining". It was marketed as a Cold War-era based "planetary defense simulator" and as a direct competitor to 2K Marin's The Bureau: XCOM Declassified, which at the time had alienated many fans due to its FPS-based gameplay.

In November 2010, the project launched a revamped website, announcing that they were accepting pre-orders. The benefits of pre-ordering included early beta access, as well as a price discount. A provisional release date was set as Autumn 2012. A public game demo was released on May 8, 2012. The game's Kickstarter fundraising project managed to raise a total of $154,715 from 4,668 backers.

Xenonauts for Windows reached beta and launched on Steam Early Access in June 2013. A full release date of the end of that year was announced in September 2013, although the developer conceded that the title might be delayed until early 2014 if additional work was required. It was released on June 17, 2014.

== Reception ==
Xenonauts was generally well received by critics, receiving a score of 85% from PC Gamer, and a 77% on Metacritic, based on 21 reviews.

== Community Edition ==
Shortly after the release of the stable version, Goldhawk Interactive allowed selected members of the community to access the source code. This resulted in the Windows only platform based community edition of the game, called Xenonauts: Community Edition, which continues development of an independent branch of the game, adding new features and bugfixes. The 1.5 version of Xenonauts incorporated a large number of these changes. While as of February 2017 Goldhawk's version of the game is in maintenance mode, Community Edition keeps updating the game with the most recent release in May 2020, a new release has recently been released as a demo under the name of Xenonauts 2 on the 18th of July 2023.

== Sequel ==
In 2015, Goldhawk Interactive hinted that they were designing and prototyping a sequel. In February 2016, Xenonauts 2 was officially announced. The game is being developed in the Unity game engine, making use of 3D graphics. As with the original game, the developers announced plans to release the game in an early access phase.
