= UFO: Afterlight =

2007 video game

- Developer(s): Altar Games
- Publisher(s): Cenega Publishing; TopWare Interactive
- Producer(s): Lukáš Veselý
- Designer(s): Radim Křivánek
- Programmer(s): Otakar Nieder
- Artist(s): David Zapletal
- Writer(s): Karel Makovský
- Composer(s): Tomáš Brejšek
- Platform(s): Microsoft Windows
- Release: EU: February 9, 2007; NA: June 12, 2007
- Genre(s): Real-time tactics Turn-based strategy
- Mode(s): Single-player

UFO: Afterlight is a 2007 real-time tactics/turn-based strategy video game and the third in Altar Games' UFO series. Like its predecessors UFO: Aftermath and UFO: Aftershock, it combines squad-level tactical combat with overlying strategic elements inspired by the 1994 classic UFO: Enemy Unknown.

== Plot ==
Following the canonical “bad” ending of UFO: Aftermath, humans agree to the terms of Reticulans who invaded Earth: some humans are moved to the Laputa over Earth (the events of UFO: Aftershock), while 10,000 colonists in cryo-sleep and a small research team are moved to Mars, with intention of terraforming the planet and making it a new home for humanity.

Immediately before the events of the game, a member of the excavation research team, Jurgen, stumbles upon an alien structure filled with robots of unknown origins. The robots awaken and attack, killing him in the tutorial mission. Soon, robots begin emerging from buried structures all over Mars. They begin attacking Human stations and even damage a critical water pipeline from the North Pole. The colonists are forced to recover and begin manufacturing armaments to protect themselves against the new threat.

Once sufficiently armed, the Humans strike back at the large robot cluster close to the original site of their discovery. The attack is successful, but a robot short circuit and activates a mysterious portal at the combat site. Aggressive alien creatures dubbed “Beastmen” pour out of the portal and open fire on the Humans, forcing them to retreat. Beastmen refuse all attempts at communication, and soon begin arriving in large numbers from several portals all over the planet. While the Humans eventually manage to destroy the power source of their portals, the Beastmen create numerous outposts all over the planet, including a large base on the other side of the planet from the Human base. The Beastmen carry out a direct attack on the Human base – while they are repelled, there is damage to the cryo facility that begins the process of awakening the colonists. The player is given a time limit to terraform and secure Mars, as the small base would not be able to sustain the awakened colonists.

The Humans are forced to defend themselves against both robots and Beastmen, while trying to research advanced technologies to fight and to terraform Mars at an increased rate. They restore contact with Earth and reach the Cultists – the antagonist faction of UFO: Aftershock – and exchange weapon technologies with them. Following the events of UFO: Aftershock, the Laputians soon defeat and replace the Cultists as a primary Earth contact, eventually sending materials, weapons, and scientific data to Mars after the war on Earth is completely won. Additionally, the Human base contacts the remnants of the Reticulan forces, who set up a small outpost to the south. Some time into the game, a different faction of Reticulans, the Expedition, lands to the West and attacks both the Humans and the Reticulans. It turns out they were sent from the Reticulan homeworld to hunt down the “rebel” Reticulans who occupied Earth. The player can align themselves with either of these two factions against the other, or fight them both for their technology and resources. Finally, once Mars is sufficiently terraformed, a race of “Martians”, the creator of robots, emerges once their homes are flooded by melting ice. Though initially hostile to Humans, they can be allied with once the player researches their language and helps them against the Beastmen threat.

Eventually, the Humans piece together the history of Mars. The Beastmen were the original inhabitants of the planet, while the “Martians” arrived from beyond the Solar System on a Myrmecol – a giant space travelling psionic being of colossal size. The Beastmen were defeated by the invaders and were cast out through portals to a distant world. Since then, they planned and trained to take back their homeworld from the invaders, until the portals were activated by the Human expedition. While the Martians agree to co-exist with humans (provided research is done to make terraforming more acceptable to them), the Beastmen refuse any notion of co-existing with other species. Thus, it is concluded that the only option the Humans have is to wipe out the entire Beastmen species. With the help of the Laputian researchers, a virus is devised that will target the Beastment DNA and will wipe out the majority of Beastment forces from the planet. However, to spread, the virus requires an Earth-like environment – making the need to terraform Mars even more pressing. Once terraforming of Mars reaches a certain threshold, the virus is released into the atmosphere, killing most Beastmen and severely weakening the resilient few that remain. The player then leads the final attack on the Beastmen main base, wiping out the few remaining commanders that remain. Victory is declared at this point, regardless of the status of other factions in the game.

== Gameplay ==
UFO: Afterlight is played in two parts. The first part is the strategy game consisting of claiming territory, building structures on the planet, managing research and production, managing personnel training, base management, and diplomacy where items and resources may be traded with other parties. The second part of Afterlight is the tactical game where, much like the previous UFO titles, up to seven soldiers may be equipped and deployed to accomplish a goal in missions. Some mission goals are to capture or kill a specific enemy, destroy or retrieve a particular item, and the ubiquitous kill everything that moves.

== Personnel ==
The game starts with a set number of characters, and a few new characters become available as the game progresses. Unlike previous titles, however, new characters cannot simply be purchased. Drones can be found in some missions who gain experience just like characters do, and can be repaired and upgraded with parts after appropriate research has been completed. Characters can have a single class such as Soldier, Technician, or Scientist. Some characters have more than one class, such as Soldier/Scientist, Soldier/Technician, or Scientist/Technician.

Human resource management features a limited pool of staff shared across all activities—combat, production, base and planetary building, research or training. For example, a technician might be needed to assist in a combat mission, work in a factory, build mines to increase resources or learn a new skill. Assignment to one job will prevent or slow down progress on other task.

All characters gain experience in their respective classes. For Soldiers, combat missions are the sole method to gain experience and Soldier levels. Technicians gain experience by working on production queues, building structures at the base or on the planet, or participating in missions requiring a Technician. Scientists gain experience by performing research in labs, building structures on the planet, or participating in missions requiring a Scientist.

As a character gains levels, training points accumulate which are used to train the character in various skills, as well as increasing a characters abilities (strength, dexterity, etc.). There are separate skill sets for Soldiers, Scientists, and Technicians. However, some of the Science and Technician trainings are useful during combat missions in addition to their respective role in the strategic game. For example, Suit Handling training allows Technicians to build suits faster, as well as repairing damaged suits while in a mission. Scientists can train Medicine, which allows them to research Medicine technologies faster and use healing devices in missions.

== Strategic game ==
In the strategic game, territories are claimed by building a particular structure called a geosonde; some territories must be cleared of opposing forces before they can be claimed. Once claimed, additional structures can be built in the territory including terraforming stations, excavation sites, resource mines, and radars. Each type of structure will require either a Technician or Scientist to build. Though only equipped with a single Scientific Craft and a single Technical Truck for sending the respective characters to build structures on the planet, quite a few characters can be placed in either vehicle thus speeding up the construction process. While they are out building structures, the Scientists and Technicians are not available for missions or any other purpose.

Territories can have resources available to mine including metal, fuel, crystals, chemicals, noble metals, and others. To tap into the resource, simply build a mine and that resource gains +1 level cumulative with other mines of the same type. Resource levels can also be traded with other factions on the planet, which will give a –1 to whatever resource is offered, and a +1 to whatever resource was offered in return (be warned that these deals cannot be undone!), otherwise there is no actual resource management. Some resources are capped at low levels unless certain buildings can be built to raise this cap. Many actions in the strategic game, such as research, production, and upgrading the base, have one or more prerequisites such as a specific technology, a particular base structure, a minimum resource level, or some combination of these requirements.

== Tactical game ==
In the tactical game, squads of Soldiers are equipped and sent on missions; they travel to and from missions in the UFO, a gift from the colonist's Reticulan friends. Technicians and Scientists with Soldier levels can be included in missions and gain Soldier experience as usual, but some missions will also give Technician or Science experience to the respective classes. It's a good idea to use the mixed class characters in missions often enough to keep their Soldier levels up for those missions that require use of a Scientist or Technician.

== Mars environment ==
The Mars landscape is a hostile place for humans and aliens alike. In the strategic view, an Environment Hostility factor will be shown that fluctuates slightly every few days. Missions will have an Environment Hostility rating based on the overall rating, and will vary by day and night. Terraforming stations will also lower the Environment Hostility for missions in that region. Suits must be worn to protect against the environment. If a Soldier is wearing a suit that is not rated high enough for the mission's Environment Hostility, the suit can become damaged while in the mission; the greater the discrepancy between the suit's rating and the Environment Hostility, the more likely the suit is to be damaged and the character be hurt. A Technician can repair damaged suits with a repair device.

== Base management ==
Base management includes building and upgrading existing base structures that grant the ability to build new weapons and equipment, expand resources, add room to perform more research or production, and train and heal characters among other things.

Research has many avenues such as Medicine, Earth Technology, Martian Technology, and Planetology among many others. Just as in other UFO titles, research is necessary to upgrade equipment, gain the use of alien technology, expand the base and improve overall capabilities. Additional Laboratories can be added if the prerequisites are met, allowing research into multiple technologies at once.

Production allows new items to be created. Each time something is added to the production queue, a build quantity can be set. Before any actual quantity of the item is produced, however, a production line takes time to set up. Once the production line is built, the items start being produced and will continue until the quantity defined is reached or the item is removed from the queue. The quantity to be built can be changed at any time, and queued items may be freely moved ahead or behind others, without affecting the production line setup time. Additional Workshops may be built if prerequisites are met, allowing multiple production queues to build multiple items at once.

== Reception ==
UFO: Afterlight received mixed reviews upon its release. It holds an average of 71/100 on aggregate website Metacritic.
