= X-COM: Interceptor =

1998 video game

- Developer: MicroProse Chapel Hill Studio
- Publisher: MicroProse
- Designer: Dave Ellis
- Series: X-COM
- Platform: Windows
- Release: NA: June 17, 1998; EU: July 1998
- Genres: Simulation, strategy
- Modes: Single-player, multiplayer

X-COM: Interceptor is the fourth main game in the X-COM series, developed by MicroProse's Chapel Hill development studio and released in 1998. The game is a combination of many genres, including space flight simulation, business simulation game and strategy game elements. More specifically, the player's role includes managing a number of X-COM space stations, piloting starfighters during hostile encounters whilst co-ordinating wingmen, and managing resources and research. X-COM Interceptor, although released as the fourth game, is actually set before X-COM: Apocalypse, thus making it the third game in the chronological order. The game was re-released in 2008 for Steam and GamersGate, and again in 2016 on GOG.com.

== Plot ==
The game begins on March 1, 2067, when the Earth's resources are all nearly depleted. To avert the slow decay of civilization, the major corporations of Earth venture into space – an area known as "The Frontier" – to find the raw materials required for humans. Unfortunately, some old enemies are already in the neighborhood when the corporations arrived - the powers from the First Alien War - and they have plans of their own for the resources of the Frontier. Plans that could very well mean the end of the human race.

The player takes command of an elite force that has been created to fight the aliens in space. Unlike previous games in the series, the game is primarily a space combat simulator, with the player flying starfighters to protect the human corporations set up to gather resources in the Frontier. The player also acts in the role of X-COM commander in the region, managing bases, resources, and the organisation's financial standing. The player also needs to capture and research alien technology in order to improve human technology and discover the reason for the aliens' interest in the region.

The end game is signified by the discovery of alien plans to build a doomsday device to destroy the surface of Earth. This device is some kind of energy weapon, larger than a space station. As the weapon itself is impossible to destroy by conventional means, the research and creation of the "Nova Bomb" is required. This is a large missile, which instead of destroying the target directly, is aimed at the central star to a system. Upon impact, it would cause the star to explode, destroying everything in the system - thus the missile's name "Nova".

The final mission is two-staged. The first stage involved entering a black hole inside a carrier (the UGS Macarthur) equipped with a special device, allowing the player to enter an alternate dimension where this weapon is stored. It involves destroying the defence craft at the black hole, whilst protecting the UGS Macarthur. If successful, the UGS Macarthur enters the black hole to enter the alternate dimension. The second part of the mission involves launching the Nova Bomb at the star of the system inside the black hole. As the missile could be destroyed for up to 1 minute after launch (after which it entered hyperspace), it requires protection from assault by enemy craft. From this mission, three possible end-game sequences are possible:

1. Mission failed - If at any point the craft the player is piloting is destroyed or disabled, or if the Macarthur is destroyed in the first part, or if the Nova Bomb is destroyed in the second part. This results in an end sequence where the aliens move the Doomsday device to Earth, and destroy it.
2. Mission successful, Macarthur destroyed - If the Macarthur is destroyed during the second part of the mission, the player becomes trapped and cannot travel back through the black hole. The mission is a success, but all craft are lost. This resulted in an end sequence detailing a memorial service for all those lost.
3. Mission successful outright - If the player succeeds in entering the black hole, launching the Nova Bomb, and returning to the Macarthur before the Nova Bomb reaches its destination, this results in an end sequence of the Macarthur returning to one of the X-COM bases with craft doing tricks around it, and fireworks being launched.

== Gameplay ==
The game's main screen differs from previous incarnations of the series. The majority of the panel is taken up by a view of the planetary systems in The Frontier, represented as stars. However, the player can zoom into the stars to see all planets and bases located in those systems. Ship squadrons and anomalous events are also shown in this display. Located elsewhere on the main screen are links to all the various base and resource management screens.

Early missions involve the detection and interception of an enemy squadron of fighters. The player responds to this, and upon the X-Com squadron intercepting the enemy craft, the game switches to the flight simulation. In this mode, the player pilots a craft along with the wingmen previously assigned to the mission, in a similar style to Wing Commander: Prophecy, with the goals of destroying or disabling the enemy ships. There are various mission types in the game, including disabling/destroying enemy craft, capturing certain special craft, interrupting alien trade routes, escorting convoys, and base raiding missions.

The player collects points for every mission, adding to the total campaign score. Every week a short report is presented, with status, recommendations or news. News include political instability and construction of Mega-Primus from X-COM: Apocalypse and the plot of X-COM: Alliance about the missing GSC Patton.

X-COM: Interceptor is the first X-COM game to include a fully functional multiplayer portion of the game.

== Development ==
The game was announced in October 1997. It went gold on June 6, 1998.

== Reception ==
Reception

Aggregate score
Aggregator	Score
GameRankings	70%

Review scores
Publication	Score
CNET Gamecenter	7/10
Computer Games Strategy Plus	3/5
Computer Gaming World	2.5/5
Edge	8/10
GameRevolution	C
GameSpot	7.5/10
IGN	7/10
Next Generation	3/5
PC Accelerator	6/10
PC Gamer (US)	60%

The game received above-average reviews according to the review aggregation website GameRankings. Edge praised the game's "enormous depth" and inventive gameplay, stating that MicroProse "managed the previously impossible task of blending real strategy with 3D space combat." However, Ron Dulin of GameSpot criticized the game for its campy tone and the out-of-place pop cultural references. Next Generation called the game "a painless way to pass the time, but aside from a good sense of camp, it fails to bring anything new to the X-Com [sic] series."

In 2010, GameFront's Phil Owen wrote, "This one is known sort of as the red-headed stepdouche of the X-Com franchise, and yet this is the one I played the most", adding that he preferred the administration and space exploration parts over the "not particularly fun" simulation part.

The game only sold about 30,000 copies.
