= Zarnitsa, Altai Krai =

Zarnitsa Зарница
- Passing loop
- Location within Altai Krai Location within Russia
- Coordinates: 51°38′N 81°17′E
- Country: Russia
- Region: Altai Krai
- District: Rubtsovsky District
- Time zone: UTC+7:00

Zarnitsa (Russian: Зарница) is a rural locality (разъезд, passing loop) in Bezrukavsky Selsoviet, Rubtsovsky District, Altai Krai, Russia. The population was 274 as of 2013. There are 5 streets.

== Geography ==
Zarnitsa is located 19 km north of Rubtsovsk (the district's administrative centre) by road. Zakharovo is the nearest rural locality.
