= Zarnitsa (game) =

Soviet and Russian children's war game

- First played: 1964

Characteristics
- Type: Competition

Presence
- Country or region: Russia

Zarnitsa (Russian: Всесоюзная пионерская военно-спортивная игра «Зарница», All-Union Young Pioneer military sports game Zarnitsa) was a massive children's war game organized within the Young Pioneers organization. The game was an imitation of military actions (reconnaissance, battles, etc.) The word zarnitsa literally means "heat lightning".

The game's rules are based on capture the flag concept. Two teams each have a base with a flag on it. Their goal is to take over the opponent's flag and preserve their own. Every player has two shoulder straps that serve as health indicators and can be torn off by the opponents. Losing one indicates "wounded", losing two indicates "dead". The "wounded" players cannot run and should only walk. The "dead" players leave the game.

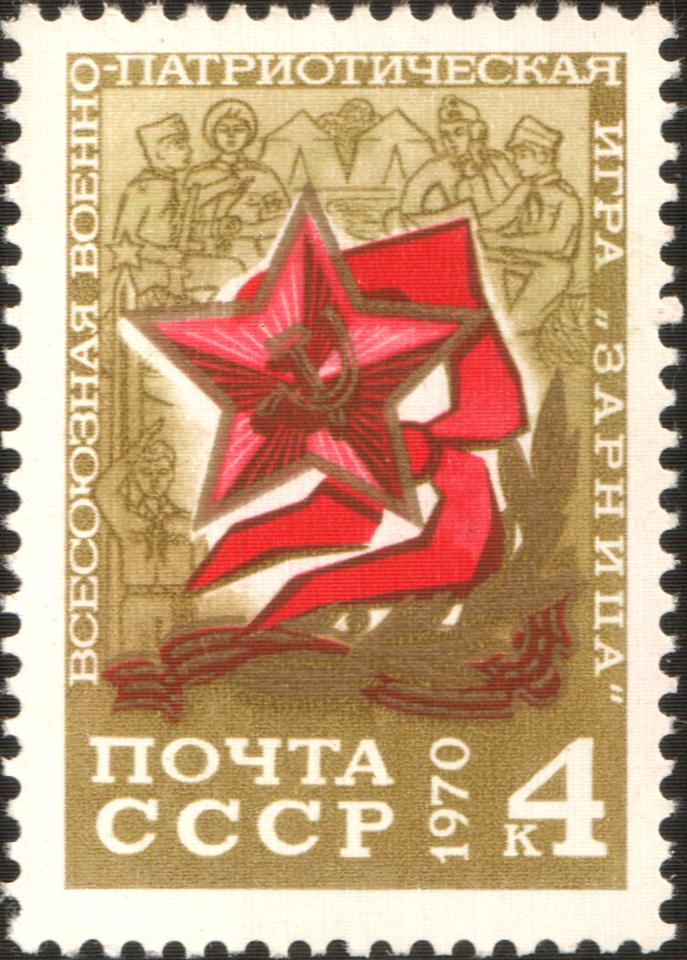
Zarnitsa postal stamp, Soviet Union

It was intended for schoolchildren of 4–7 classes (10–13 years old). A similar game, Orlyonok (Орлёнок), was for older schoolchildren.

The game was revived in modern Russia as "All-Russian military sports game Zarnitsa".
