= John Broomhall =

British musician

John Broomhall is an English composer, audio producer/director, journalist and consultant, working mainly in the video game industry. During the 1990s, Broomhall worked with MicroProse/Spectrum HoloByte as their head of audio. He has played live jazz, blues, funk and gospel. In 2002, he set up Broomhall Projects Limited (BPL) "to provide a full range of audio services covering management, consultancy, content direction and production."

In 2009, he was honoured with a Recognition Award by the Game Audio Network Guild. He also chaired many BAFTA Audio Awards and sits on the BAFTA Video Games Committee.

== Work ==
=== Games ===
- Phoenix Point (2018) - music composer
- Transport Tycoon Mobile (2014) - remaster of the original soundtrack.
- Forza Motorsport 5(2013)
- New International Track & Field (2008)
- Heavenly Sword (2007)
- Go! Sudoku (2006)
- B-Boy (2006)
- Chris Sawyer's Locomotion (2004)
- Grand Prix 4 (2002)
- Micro Machines (2002)
- Slam Tennis (2002)
- Superman: Shadow of Apokolips (2002)
- Frogger 2: Swampy's Revenge (2000)
- Grand Prix 3 (2000) - audio producer
- Em@il Games: X-COM (1999) - sound designer
- Grand Prix World (1999) - audio producer
- MechWarrior 3 (1999) - music composer
- Spirit of Speed 1937 (1999) - sound technician
- X-COM: Apocalypse (1997) - music composer, sound designer
- Grand Prix Manager 2 (1996) - music composer, audio producer
- Grand Prix 2 (1995) - music composer, sound designer
- Grand Prix Manager (1995) - audio producer
- Navy Strike (1995) - music composer
- Sid Meier's Colonization (1995) - audio producer (Amiga)
- Transport Tycoon Deluxe (1995) - music composer
- X-COM: Terror from the Deep (1995) - music composer (PC), audio producer
- Transport Tycoon (1994) - music composer
- UFO: Enemy Unknown (1994) - music composer (PC), audio producer
- Air Duel: 80 Years of Dogfighting (1993) - music composer (PC)
- Fields of Glory (1993) - music composer
- B-17 Flying Fortress (1992) - music composer
- Harrier Jump Jet (1992) - music composer
- The Legacy: Realm of Terror (1992) - music composer
- Sid Meier's Civilization (1992) - music composer, sound designer (Amiga)
- Formula One Grand Prix (1992) - music composer (PC)
- David Leadbetter's Greens (1991) - music composer (PC)
- Special Forces (1991)
