= F1 Racing Championship =

2000 video game

- Developers: Ubi Soft Shanghai; Ubi Soft Milan
- Publisher: Video System
- Platforms: Dreamcast, Game Boy Color, Nintendo 64, PlayStation, PlayStation 2, Windows
- Release: September 15, 2000: PlayStation; UK: September 15, 2000; NA: September 26, 2000 Game Boy Color; PAL: November 10, 2000; NA: 2000 Nintendo 64; PAL: December 8, 2000; BR: January 2001 Dreamcast; PAL: January 19, 2001 Windows; PAL: March 23, 2001; NA: 2001 PlayStation 2; NA: April 16, 2001
- Genre: Sim racing
- Modes: Single-player, multiplayer

F1 Racing Championship is a racing video game developed and distributed by Ubi Soft, and published by Video System. Starring people and locations from the 1999 Formula One World Championship, it was released for several platforms during 2000 and 2001. At the time, it was facing steep competition by the ever-popular Grand Prix 3 and the rising F1 series by ISI. The sales were behind expectations. Reasons were a poor artificial intelligence and damage model and the bug-prone initial release. A patch to fix the reported issues was announced, but never released.

The soundtrack featured "Girl Don't Come" by American/British band Garbage; the main audio sounds in the menu were replicated in Racing Simulation 3, brought out a couple of years later, which again did not sell well due to licensing issues.

== Gameplay ==
Similar to Racing Simulation 2, the player can choose between individual races or the full season. F1 Racing Championship contains several playable game modes: Single, Arcade, Grand Prix (training, qualifications and warm-ups) and Time Attack. Another thing akin to RS 2 is the ghost mode, with an available free route choice. The goal is to set the best time whenever possible, helped by the artificial intelligence controlled Ghost. The Ghost is a transparent figure that drives the current best time, either by default, or the one set by the player previously. It can be helpful for new players to learn braking and acceleration points better or develop a curve driving style. Overall, the game features 22 drivers from 11 teams, and 16 tracks used in the 1999 Formula One World Championship. The multiplayer relies on local area network integration, supporting 22 players to compete simultaneously. A two player split screen mode is also included.

As a sim racing game, it focuses heavily on realism, allowing the management of every vehicle parameter. Different cars will accordingly behave in its own way. The interface tries to emulate TV banners, showing the distance between the vehicles, both in front and behind. The opponent drivers were made to resemble their counterparts' performance from 1999, and can make more or less mistakes. A number of driving aids can be used, from anti-lock braking system, steering/braking aid to ideal racing line display. During the races, there is always a chance the player can set the vehicle on fire, or lose the control during sudden accelerations at the curves. The tires are subject to wearing off over the time. Thanks to Ubi Soft having the official FIA license at the time, all stages were fully replicated from the real-life tracks, including the whole circuit layout and decorations.

In the PlayStation version, an offer exists between arcade and simulation, the latter being divided into two physics variants. In arcade, the physics are more lenient as the turning is made easier, while slamming into other vehicles doesn't inflict any damage. As the player passes each opponent, a specific number of points is received. The game rewards clean takeovers with more points. All tracks are slowly unlocked through separate difficulty sets. Once the race is decided to be played, a Free Session can be opened for testing the setup. A new mode, School, aims to teach the positioning and braking/acceleration points on any track available. It has a horizontal bar with a middle vertical line, and the closer the car gets to the braking point, the yellow bar begins to fill more. When it hits the line, it will change to red.

== Development and release ==
The team of 12 people developed the game in Revenge engine, whose creation took about a year. It allows the integrated circuit terrain to have a big influence on driving by calculating physical parameters. Every detail found in the game has been modeled through GPS, resulting in faithful recreations. Since all circuits have been filmed in 360 degrees, even the smallest things have been inserted in with a depth of field of one kilometer.

Ubisoft originally planned to release the Nintendo 64 version in the United States by the end of 2000, but cancelled it. Gradiente Entertainment released this version in Brazil on January 31, 2001.

== Reception ==
Reception

Review scores
Publication	Score
4Players	87%
Electronic Gaming Monthly	5/10
Famitsu	25/40
Game Informer	8.75/10
IGN	7.5/10
Jeuxvideo.com	17/20
N64 Magazine	72%
PlayStation Official Magazine – UK	7/10
PC Zone	70%
PlayStation: The Official Magazine	6/10

Official UK PlayStation Magazine said the PlayStation version was "a playable game, spoiled by sloppy presentation". In Japan, where the PlayStation 2 version was ported and published by Video System on July 26, 2001, Famitsu gave it a score of 25 out of 40.
