= Racing Simulation 3 =

2002 video game

- Developer: Ubi Soft Paris (Note: On the PlayStation 2, it is pronounced Ubisoft Paris (after the Ubi Soft rebrand to Ubisoft with all substances on September 9, 2003).)
- Publisher: Ubi Soft (Note: The Ubi Soft brand was in the Windows version of the game, while its name Ubisoft (after the Ubi Soft rebrand to Ubisoft with all substances on September 9, 2003) was in the PlayStation 2 version.)
- Platforms: Windows, PlayStation 2
- Release: Windows: NA: December 2002; PAL: December 5, 2002; PlayStation 2: PAL: October 30, 2003
- Genre: Sim racing
- Modes: Single-player, multiplayer

RS3: Racing Simulation 3 is a racing video game developed by Ubi Soft Paris and published by Ubi Soft. It is a sequel to Monaco Grand Prix: Racing Simulation 2. It was released for Microsoft Windows in December 2002. A PlayStation 2 port was released in October of the next year, albeit exclusively in Europe.

== Gameplay ==
Racing Simulation 3 is a genericized approximation of the real life Formula One, but it lacks any officially licensed materials. Drivers and teams are given generic names. Track layouts are often authentic to real-world counterparts, but they are usually attributed to neighboring countries. For example, the Albert Park Circuit in Melbourne, Australia is instead located in New Zealand. PC Games noted that the Hockenheim layout is likewise placed in Poland "for licensing reasons". Despite the previous title being named for the Monaco Grand Prix, Racing Simulation 3 lacks any representation of the Circuit de Monaco.

Sixteen circuits are included, and a bundled editor, the RS3 Custom Tool, lets players rename the drivers and teams and import their own car textures, so that real names can be reinstated manually. The Windows version offers six modes: single race, full race, championship, time attack, private trials and a scenario mode, and multiplayer is supported over a local area network.

Beneath its arcade presentation the game retains simulation elements, including extensive car setup options and detailed telemetry, while weather and dirty tyres affect handling. The publisher advertised collision effects and cars modelled with around 3,000 polygons each, but reviewers reported that the Windows version had no meaningful damage model. The PlayStation 2 port opens with a fifteen-part driving school.

== Development and release ==
Racing Simulation 3 was produced by Ubi Soft's Paris studio as the publisher's fourth Formula One title, following F1 Racing Simulation (1997), Monaco Grand Prix: Racing Simulation 2 (1998) and F1 Racing Championship. Ubi Soft detailed the project in September 2002, describing an updated version of the engine used in its earlier games, new camera views and improved artificial intelligence. Unlike F1 Racing Championship, which had carried the FIA licence, the new game shipped without it. The PlayStation 2 port followed on 30 October 2003, exclusively in Europe, by which time the publisher had restyled its name from Ubi Soft to Ubisoft.

== Reception ==
Reception

Review scores
Publication	Score
4Players	73%
Jeuxvideo.com	10/20
PC Games	7/10 (PC)
Maniac	46/100 (PS2)

The game received mixed to negative reviews, with its most substantial coverage coming from French and German outlets. Marcel Kleffmann of 4Players rated the Windows version 73%, and PC Games gave it 7 out of 10; both found a genuine simulation with deep setup options, telemetry and weather effects underneath a game that otherwise behaved like a fun racer, and criticised the weak opposition, the missing damage model and the dated graphics. Jeuxvideo.com scored it 10 out of 20, praising the depth of customisation but judging the driving close to unplayable and the game unworthy of its predecessors. Reviewing the PlayStation 2 version for the German magazine Maniac, Ulrich Steppberger rated its single-player component 46 out of 100, criticising the insensitive steering, unrealistic physics and choppy graphics.
