= Transport Tycoon =

1994 simulation video game

- Publisher: MicroProse
- Producer: Steve Ramsden
- Designer: Chris Sawyer
- Programmer: Chris Sawyer
- Artist: Simon Foster
- Composer: John Broomhall
- Platforms: MS-DOS, Classic Mac OS, PlayStation, Saturn, Android, iOS
- Release: November 1994: MS-DOS; NA/EU: November 1994 Mac; JP: 1996; PlayStation; EU: 15 September 1997; JP: 6 August 1998; Saturn; JP: 20 November 1997; iOS, Android; WW: 3 October 2013
- Genre: Business simulation
- Modes: Single-player, multi-player

Transport Tycoon is a business simulation game designed and programmed by Chris Sawyer for MS-DOS. It was published by MicroProse in November 1994. Using an isometric 2D view with graphics by Simon Foster, the player acts as a transport company owner, who competes against rival companies to make as much profit as possible by transporting passengers and various goods by road, rail, sea, and air.

Transport Tycoon Deluxe is an expanded and improved version of the original game, released in 1995. A version for Android and iOS was released on 3 October 2013 based on the sequel, Chris Sawyer's Locomotion. Two fan-made game engine recreations, OpenTTD and Simutrans, are also available. In November 2024, Atari SA acquired the intellectual property rights from Chris Sawyer and re-released the Deluxe edition on digital distribution platforms Steam and GOG.com in 2026.

== Gameplay ==
Transport Tycoon is a business simulation game where the player takes control over a transportation company and is tasked with building out a transportation network by constructing transport routes in order to move passengers, mail, goods and materials around an isometric map to earn money. Players have a variety of vehicles to their disposal, including trains, trucks, buses, ships, airplanes and helicopters. Every map in the vanilla game is randomly generated. The main goal of the game is to make the most profit over the course of the game. Additionally, the game tracks high scores at higher difficulty levels, but they do not determine the win-state. The game takes place in real-time and can be played optionally against a maximum of seven computer opponents. A game spans a century with the start in 1930, and finishing in 2030. There is the option to continue playing but the game won't keep a score. Time ticks off in set increments, every in-game year takes about roughly 20 minutes. The game allows the player to save at any time, and multiple saves of a particular game at any point are possible. It also provides the opportunity to play against another human player via a serial link and a modem connection.

There are a number of difficulty options available that can be modified, including difficulty and speed of the competitors, various terrain generation settings, quantity of towns and industries, subsidy multiplier, disaster occurrences and the choice between a steady or cyclical economy. Based on personal preferences, there are a number of currencies the user can pick from and town names are either based on American, English or European names. Upon starting a new game the player is asked to pick an avatar, name and primary colour for the company. The player starts out by borrowing money to finance construction of transport facilities, and is charged interest until the loan is repaid. The game also features disasters, vehicle crashes and town councils. Players can not construct their own cities, but can rename existing ones.

Chart illustrating flow of commodities between industries and towns in Transport Tycoon, and Temperate scenarios in Transport Tycoon Deluxe

Routes are created by building stations between two or more locations, with the available transportation options being rail, road, air and maritime. Each type of transport comes with its own advantages and disadvantages, and depending on the vehicle can only carry passengers or certain goods. One transport route can utilize several different forms of transport, e.g. truck→ship→train. The player's company and the individual stations each have ratings that depend largely on their efficiency at moving goods from one stations to the other. A station with high ratings may attract more goods. Players can terraform the environment per tile or build canals to improve their routes, and buildings like train stations can only build on even ground. Stations and airports only accept cargo of nearby industry and towns around their local vicinity. Different stations and their area coverage can be combined into a single station if they are built adjacently. As the user plays the game and earns revenue, they have the choice of expanding service along existing routes, or expanding their transportation network. The game features a progression of technology: in any particular year of the game generally only contemporary types of technology are available. For example, in the beginning there are only steam engines, but later diesel and electric engines are introduced. In the game year 1999, monorails become available. These require a separate track system from railroads.

Vehicles in the game must be constructed at corresponding depots, which must be connected to the road or rail networks. Over the course of the game, new models of vehicles are introduced and eventually come to replace older models. Manufacturers can offer prototype designs to the player. These new vehicles generally have improved characteristics, but may suffer from reliability issues. Every vehicle comes with its own attributes, that include reliability, maintenance costs, speed, capacity and lifespan. Eventually, vehicles will need replacing as they breakdown more over time and maintenance costs increase. Vehicle sound effects change volume depending on the magnification level of the map.

Towns and cities have their own road networks, but extra roads may be needed to connect them to other towns, or to various resources. The player earns revenue by picking up resources or passengers at a certain station, and delivering them to another station where there is a demand for them. Demand is determined by the area which surrounds the station; for example stations close to towns will demand passengers. The revenues will depend on the delivery time, distance, and quantity delivered. The influence of these factors on revenue varies according to the type of goods being delivered. A product like mail will rapidly fall in value, meaning that it can only be delivered profitably over short distances, or over long distances very fast. In contrast with a resource like coal loses value very slowly, so it retains its value over long distances.

The game features also a system called Local Authority. Each city has a rating for every transport company based on the impact of their transport network. When the rating falls too low, the player will no longer be able to demolish buildings or construct new stations. The rating depends on, among others, the level of service and the deforestation caused by the company. Additionally, there is an option to advertise in a town in order to take away business from rival companies. In later stages the largest cities can offer exclusive contracts for a single year. At times, subsidies are offered by city governments to the first company to move a particular resource to their cities. In the course of a game, cities develop and expand according to various economic factors, and new industries (demand) or other resource sites (supply) may appear. Some natural resources will eventually be exhausted and industries without adequate transport service can shut down.

=== Transport Tycoon Deluxe ===
Transport Tycoon Deluxe is an expanded and improved version of the original game, although the gameplay loop is largely unaltered.

The Deluxe edition has added various new game options, which includes three new environment options alongside the original Temperate climate. They are called Sub-Tropical, Arctic, and Toyland. Every terrain type introduces its own landscape, industries, buildings and vehicles. Supply and demands are also modified. Each option comes with ten pre-made maps. The World Editor, from the previous expansion is also included - Allowing the creation of custom maps and scenarios. The Martian tileset from the previous add-on is omitted from this release. The start date was moved to 1950 with the new endpoint set to 2050. With an option to change the start date in the world editor. It also added network play via an IPX connection, and the music theme for the main menu was remixed.

The updated release comes with number of in-game tweaks and features. Including the ability to buy land for future use, to refit existing ships and planes, funding construction of new industry and the capability to buy and sell shares of other companies, giving the player the opportunity to buyout the competition. Maglev trains and track were added. Helicopter can now be built separately at heliports. Players now also can rename their vehicles, stations and towns in-game. the Deluxe version loses many of the earlier vehicles from the original game, while adding several new types later on. Moreover, the vehicle names in the original game were based on real-life models, but were replaced with fictional ones in Transport Tycoon Deluxe, due to trademark issues. It also has improved railway signals, as the player is now allowed to build on diagonal track sections. The original Transport Tycoon only included bi-directional signals, permitting trains to pass in either direction, while the Deluxe edition introduced uni-directional signals, to restrict trains to a single direction of travel.

== Development ==
Having been playing Sid Meier's Railroad Tycoon, Populous and SimCity, Scottish game designer and programmer Chris Sawyer began exploring ideas and prototypes for a transport simulation game as early as October 1992, using his own isometric game engine he had developed in his spare time. For Sawyer, the game, known originally as Chris Sawyer's Transport Game or Interactive Transport Simulation, started off as a way to contend with the monotony of his game conversion work, which he began in 1988 and during this period he worked on various high-profile games like Frontier: Elite II, Goal!, Campaign and Elite Plus. These game conversions allowed him to self-finance development of the game until he would sign a publishing deal. Transport Tycoon would be his first major original computer game. His goal for the project was to try and create a game that would improve and expand upon the original Railroad Tycoon, which he spent six months playing, by including other types of transportation and trying to "simulate a world". During development, Sawyer regarded Railroad Tycoon and A-Train as his main game design influences on the game, with SimCity 2000 and Theme Park providing some inspiration in the latter parts of production.

The game also would allow him to combine his love for open ended simulation games and trains, he began with adding them into the game world alongside other vehicles. Sawyer wanted "little vehicles all going about their business", where both playing and observing the action is enjoyable. Sawyer researched as much as he could about the four types of transportion vehicles in the game as much as time constraints would allow in order to present the vehicles as accurately as possible. Although he admitted in an interview, he did not have enough time to research non-British train and road vehicles extensively. The game was entirely written in x86 assembly language, Sawyer has stated that he prefers to write in a low-level programming language as opposed to a high-level programming language like C as he wants to know what every function does in complete detail and to optimise for efficiency. He claimed that working in assembly code allowed him to add more complexity to the game, as it allowed him to optimize the workload on the processor better, without going over memory limits.

Over the course of development, Sawyer in addition to adding different modes of transport, he implemented various different worlds and a basic economic mechanic to earn money, one that was even more simple than the one in Railroad Tycoon. For the sake of simplicity he excluded things like stocks and shares as it added too much "unnecessary complexity". The time period was set from 1930 to 2030, as this would according to Sawyer lead to "greatest variety of train and vehicle type" and that 100 years per playthrough felt right. It would give players 30 years of steam trains followed-up by diesel and electric trains, and ending with high-tech monorails. He did consider adding more futuristic instant transportations like a 'Matter Transporter', but came to the conclusion it would probably provide an anti-climatic end to game, by making the old transportation network redundant. Any other time periods that weren't included were saved for future updates or add-ons of the game. Creating a challenging artificial intelligence was of paramount importance for Sawyer. He considered it the most challenging element to program, he would spend hours playing the game on his own figuring out the best strategies a human player would use and then building algorithms that simulate those aforementioned strategies for the opponent companies. He wanted the computer opponents to play by the same rules as the human ones did. Due to complexities and detail of the simulation, adding a fast forward option proved unfeasible at the time.

By the time Sawyer had finished up his last game conversion contracts, Goal and Frontier Elite 2, he had created a full-fledged version of the game in low resolution with his own crudely hand-drawn graphics. He decided to spend all of his time for a couple of months on the project and see how much progress he would make. On recommendation of a friend, Sawyer got in touch with graphics artist Simon Foster and brought him over to Scotland to look at the game. They immediately signed a deal, on the condition that Foster would be paid when a publication deal was signed. The low quality bitmaps Sawyer drew were replaced by Foster. He recreated the art of the trains, trucks, buildings and scenery with high-resolution bitmaps. This was made possible by improvements in processing speeds and graphics handling, and the increasing adoption of graphic cards with the ability to output in higher resolutions, which allowed them to render the redone art and sound. A number of buildings in the game were based on real-life structures, primarily from the Glasgow area including the Livingstone Tower.

By November 1993, Sawyer had a playable version of the game. Jacqui Lyons, Sawyer's business agent, approached a number of video game publishers with an unfinished version of the game in March 1994. Sawyer would leverage his preexisting relationship as a work-for-hire programmer with MicroProse, to convince them to take a chance on a game. Following a productive meeting with MicroProse, Sawyer agreed to sign with them to publish the game, as he found the team at MicroProse more supportive. Ultimately, they would publish the game, which included changing the name to Transport Tycoon, where it would sit alongside their Railroad Tycoon franchise. When he signed the contract with MicroProse, the railroad parts were already nearly finished. Originally, a producer at MicroProse set the timetable of two years for the rest of development, but Sawyer managed to get the game in shippable state in 4–5 months, although he had to cut some content and ideas. Some of these were later included in the deluxe edition. MicroProse had little input on the project itself, except for a few things like what would happen when the player wins the game, most of their feedback was either unfeasible or ignored. Sawyer described his collaboration with the team at MicroProse as a positive experience and viewed them as a vital partner when it came to testing and finishing up the game. On a suggestion of MicroProse, the game contains a few easter eggs referencing other MicroProse games. In their October 1994 issue, the PC Review preview described the build as being in early beta.

=== Add-ons and ports ===
After the release of Transport Tycoon, Sawyer stated in a July 1995 interview that he would create add-ons for the main game, he also began working on an expanded "Deluxe/CD" version and console ports for the ones that had enough processing power. The first add-on was a world editor which allows players to create their own scenarios. The add-on also included a Martian graphics set.

Sawyer would return to game development in the 2010s with the mobile port of the game. At first, Sawyer had set up his own company named 31X Ltd as an holding company for the Transport Tycoon IP in 2010, but over time, it evolved to a company that could develop and publish a new port of the game. Lyons came up first with the concept of bringing the game to mobile devices and managed to secure the rights after a prolonged negotiation. Sawyer was originally focusing on funding for the game, but ended up overseeing the design and helped with the debugging. Under his supervision, he brought in a London based company named Origin8 to remake the game for iPhones, iPads, and Android devices. Sawyer viewed these mobile platforms versions as an interesting technical challenge as these devices had become powerful enough to run the game and he stated that the "tactile nature" of interactive isometric simulation/strategy games, "really suits the touch screen interface." The biggest challenge for the team was keeping scale and depth intact of the original intact without sacrificing playability, they didn't want to "simpfly" or "dumb down" the game. This required developing a new tutorial tailored towards touch-screens.

=== Music ===
The music in Transport Tycoon are original compositions by John Broomhall. He was the in-house musician at MicroProse at the time and was tasked with providing the music. Broomhall came up with the idea of using jazz by himself after playing the game and would create over 20 original pieces. It features old-style blues, funk and jazz tunes, including parts of Herbie Hancock's Cantaloupe Island. Sawyer had no involvement with the creation of the music. Transport Tycoon was part of Broomhall's early scores as a composer that he created in MIDI, the soundtrack was limited to a nine-note polyphony and was built on an FM soundcard.

Broomhall alongside some of his industry colleagues would in 2014 record a remaster of the original soundtrack in a live environment and employing the latest sound technology. He envisioned them as the definitive version of the originals as he initially had imagined. The new remastered music was included in the Easter update of the mobile port of the game.

== Release ==
A demo of the game was an exclusive 3.5" disk for the October 1994 issue of PC Review, and it was also included on the PC Gamer January 1995 CD-ROM and 3.5" disk. MicroProse published the full game for MS-DOS in November 1994. Together with Railroad Tycoon and Pizza Tycoon, it was marketed as part of MicroProse's Tycoon franchise.

The game received its first add-on titled with Transport Tycoon Scenario also referred to as World Editor. It contained a Martian tile set, a world editor, that allows the player to create their own maps and scenarios, and full modem play. It was released somewhere in Spring 1995 and required the base game. The expansion that would ultimately become Transport Tycoon Deluxe, was at first reported to be a sequel named Transport Tycoon 2. MicroProse released the updated version Transport Tycoon Deluxe the following year in November 1995. This edition was compatible with Windows 95.

In 2024, Atari SA acquired the intellectual property rights from Chris Sawyer, with the intention of preserving and expanding on the game. Atari republished the Transport Tycoon Deluxe version of the game on Steam and GOG in 2026. The game had been considered abandonware for years and was legally unavailable to purchase. Alongside this new release, OpenTTD on these platforms now requires owning the rerelease. OpenTTD remains available for free on the developers website.

== Ports ==
A port for the PlayStation was announced by MicroProse that was slated for a June 1996 release, and was ported by Digital Amusement. This version of the game included an extra rotational 3-D view feature that allowed players to visit the gameworld upclose. It was also compatible with the PlayStation Mouse. The release was delayed multiple times, with the second release date set in March 1997. The game was ultimately published by Ocean Software and MicroProse in September 1997. A version for the Japanese market called Transport Tycoon 3D was published by Unbalance Corporation on 6 August 1998. Japanese publisher Imagineer developed and published a port for the Saturn exclusively for the Japanese market in 1997.

On 15 July 2013, Sawyer's 31X Ltd and Origin8 Technologies announced that they were working on a mobile version of Transport Tycoon. The game was released for iOS and Android on 3 October 2013. The game is single player and is primarily based on Chris Sawyer's Locomotion. Unlike what is a common practice in mobile gaming, the release was not free-to-play. Sawyer has stated that he found the revenue model unsuitable for the game.

== Reception ==
Reception

Review scores
Publication	Score
Computer Gaming World	4/5
Computer and Video Games	90/100
Edge	8/10
Hyper	79%
Next Generation	4/53/5 (Scenario)
PC Format	90%
PC Gamer (UK)	91/100
PC Gamer (US)	91/100
PC Zone	94%
CD-ROM Today	3.5/5
Computer Game Review and CD-Rom Entertainment	88%
Computer Player	8/10
Electronic Entertainment	4/5
Electronic Games	B
PC Games (UK)	93%
PC Review	9/10

Upon release Transport Tycoon received significant critical acclaim from contemporary PC reviewers, they viewed it as an evolution and major improvement over Railroad Tycoon. SimCity 2000 was a frequent comparison point and Transport Tycoon was regarded as MicroProse's answer to the Maxis game. Critics praised in particular its addictive gameplay, mechanical depth, graphical fidelity and detail, sound effects and music. In contrast, they were more divided on the user interface, and A.I. opponents. The most uniform criticism was reserved for the game manual, for the inadequate information it provided to new players.

The game's SVGA graphical fidelity and animations received the most widespread praise, with some calling it one the best looking games on the platform at the time. Both branches of PC Gamer were highly positive, with the American edition describing it as a virtual world that "comes to life" in "stunning realism and detail" and called the animation "incredible". The British reviewer called the SVGA graphics "superb" which are "lovely drawn" and "highly detailed". Edge stated that the graphics were "wonderful". PC Zone praised the "gloriously" high-resolution isometric graphics, writing that were "incredibly neat and detailed" and comparing it favourably to SimCity 2000 and Railroad Tycoon. Computer and Video Games proclaimed it was the best looking sim game around, stating that it was "superbly detailed", that was "unbearably cute" to look at and "beautifully animated". PC Review also highlighted the presentation saying that game offers some of the "best presentation techniques" PC owners have access to, although he expressed some frustrations with the "slightly fuzzy nature" of the isometric landscapes when using the terraforming controls.

A reviewer for Next Generation gave the DOS version four out of five stars, commenting, "The best economic sim since Civilization, Microprose's new Transport Tycoon has all the features of Sid Meier's Railroad Tycoon mixed with the look and ease of Maxis' SimCity 2000 and a host of new features ... that give the game a feel that is all its own." He further lauded the game for its graphics, "pleasant" music, sound effects, addictive play, and realistic simulation of the growth of cities and towns.

Next Generation reviewed the Transport Tycoon Scenario, rating it three stars out of five, and stated that "A solid upgrade for a great game."

== Legacy and successors ==
Transport Tycoon Deluxe was named as the 50th greatest strategy game by Adam Smith for Rock Paper Shotgun in 2015, he described the game as "Chris Sawyer's masterpiece".

=== Chris Sawyer's Locomotion ===
After the success of Transport Tycoon Deluxe, Chris Sawyer turned his attention towards a sequel, but during development he changed his mind and produced RollerCoaster Tycoon, which turned out to be a runaway hit. After RollerCoaster Tycoon 2 was done, work on the third version was left to another development team, and Sawyer returned to work on a Transport Tycoon sequel, Chris Sawyer's Locomotion. It was released in September 2004 and was described by Sawyer as the "spiritual successor to Transport Tycoon". It received poor reviews from critics and a tepid response from audiences,

=== Third-party creations ===
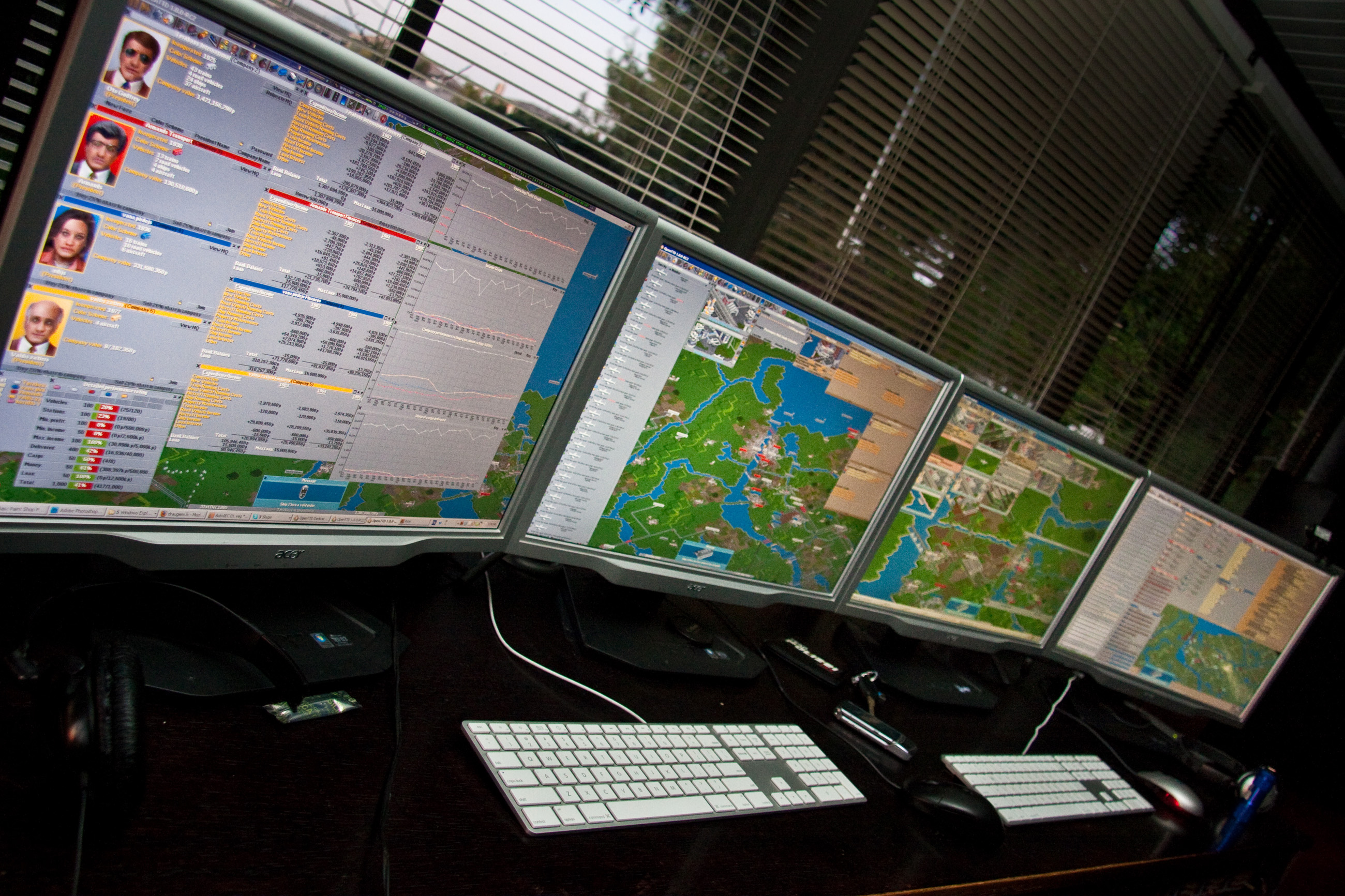
OpenTTD network game across four monitors

Following the release of the Deluxe edition, several third-party development teams have continued developing their own free open-source version of Transport Tycoon, with the goal of improving and expanding upon the original. Simutrans is a stand-alone freeware transportation simulator game that began development in 1997 by Hansjörg Malthaner. He handed over development of the game to a group of developers in 2004.

OpenTTD is an open source complete recreation of Transport Tycoon Deluxe, achieved by reverse engineering the original game with its first release in 2004. It delivers many bug fixes and general enhancements to the game, like making it possible to run TTD on multiple platforms, including Mac, Linux, PSP, and Android. The game allows for new graphic sets for vehicles and terrain to be used. While OpenTTD can still use the original TTD graphics and sounds, it does not need any of the TTD files to run as it has free graphics and sounds.

== See also ==
- Pizza Tycoon
- Railroad Tycoon
- SimCity 2000

== Sources ==
- "Trademark Status & Document Retrieval". United States Patent and Trademark Office.
- Bennett, John (October 1994a). "Transport Tycoon - Preview". PC Review. No. 36. Farringdon, London: EMAP.
- Stokes, Nick; Sawyer, Chris (November 1994). Transport Tycoon Instruction Manual (instruction manual). MicroProse.
- "Hauling a load of coal down Interstate 88 - CGR Previews". Computer Game Review and CD-Rom Entertainment. Vol. 4, no. 5. Lombard, Illinois: Sendai Publishing. December 1994.
- "Transport Tycoon - A new offering you can't refuse". Computer Games Strategy Plus. No. 49. Burlington, Vermont: Chips & Bits. December 1994.
- MacDonald, T. Liam (January 1995). "Cover Feature - Planes. Trains Automobiles. and Ships, too". PC Gamer. Vol. 2, no. 1. GP Publications. pp. 48–55.
- Butcher, Andy (December 1994). "Authoritative - Transport Tycoon". PC Gamer UK. Vol. 1, no. 12. Bath, Somerset: Future Publishing.
- Bennett, John (December 1994b). "Transport Tycoon - Review". PC Review. No. 38. Farringdon, London: EMAP.
- Evans, Dean (December 1994). "Transport Tycoon". PC Games. No. 5. Farringdon, London: EMAP.
- MacDonald, Duncan (December 1994). "Transport Tycoon - Review". PC Zone. No. 21. London, England: Dennis Publishing.
- Perry, Kevin; Chapman, Ted; Kaiafas, Tasos (January 1995). "What about all of the unemployed horses?". Computer Game Review and CD-Rom Entertainment. Vol. 4, no. 6. Lombard, Illinois: Sendai Publishing.
- Bennett, John (January 1995). "Transport Tycoon". Computer and Video Games. No. 158. Farringdon Lane, London: Tower Publishing.
- Wheeler, Chris (January 1995). "Transport Tycoon - Review". Hyper. No. 14. Sydney, Australia: Otter Publications.
- Ramshaw, Mike (January 1995). "Transport Tycoon". PC Format. No. 41. Future plc.
- "Transport Tycoon". PC Games. No. 6. Farringdon, London: EMAP. January 1995.
- Brozen, Reed (February 1995). "Transport Tycoon". Computer Games Strategy Plus. No. 51. Burlington, Vermont: Chips & Bits.
- "Transport Tycoon". Edge. No. 17. Bath, Somerset: Future Publishing. February 1995.
- Buchanan, Lee (March 1995a). "Transport Tycoon - Review". PC Gamer. Vol. 2, no. 3. Greensboro, North Carolina: GP Publications.
- Backer, Andy (March 1995a). "Unca's strategy for beginners". Computer Games Strategy Plus. No. 52. Burlington, Vermont: Chips & Bits.
- Hayes, Jr., Robert L. (March 1995). "Move It Or Lose It". Computer Gaming World. No. 128. Anaheim Hills, California: Ziff Davis.
- "Transport Tycoon World Editor". PC Review. No. 43. Farringdon, London: EMAP. April 1995.
- Israels, David (March 1995). "Transport Tycoon". Electronic Entertainment. Vol. 3, no. 2. IDG.
- "Transport Tycoon". Next Generation. No. 4. Burlingame, California: GP Publications. April 1995.
- Backer, Andy (April 1995b). "Unca picks up where the bus drops you off". Computer Games Strategy Plus. No. 53. Chips & Bits.
- McCann, Kevin (1995). "Transport Tycoon Review". Computer Player. Vol. 1, no. 11. Beverly Hills, California: HG Publications.
- Buchanan, Lee (1 May 1995b). Transport Tycoon: Strategies and Secrets. United States: Sybex Inc. ISBN 078211752X.
- Kent, Steven L. (May 1995). "Transport Tycoon". CD-ROM Today. Vol. 3, no. 5. Imagine Publishing. p. 108.
- McDonald, T. Liam (May 1995). "Transportation on Mars". PC Gamer. Vol. 2, no. 5. Greensboro, North Carolina: GP Publications.
- "E3 1995 Directory". E3 Directories. United States: IDG Communications. May 1995.
- "Finals". Next Generation. No. 6. Imagine Media. June 1995.
- Webb, Jeff (July 1995). "Transport Tycoon". PC Solutions. No. 7. London, England: Quay Publishing.
- Meredith, Gary (July 1995). "Pizza Tycoon". CD-ROM Today. Vol. 3, no. 7. Imagine Publishing. p. 79.
- Basham, Tom (July 1995). "Trains, Planes & Automobiles". Electronic Games. Vol. 3, no. 10. Lombard, Illinois: Decker Publications.
- "Transport Tycoon Deluxe". PC Review. No. 49. Farringdon, London: EMAP. November 1995.
- Haslam, Rik (November 1995). Transport Tycoon Deluxe Instruction Manual (instruction manual). United Kingdom: MicroProse.
- Evans, Dean (December 1995). "Transport Tycoon Deluxe". PC Format. No. 51. Bath, Somerset: Future Publishing.
- Flynn, James (January 1996). "Review: Transport Tycoon Deluxe". PC Gamer UK. No. 26. Bath, Somerset: Future Publishing.
- McDonald, T. Liam (February 1996). "Where No Train Has Gone Before". PC Gamer. Vol. 3, no. 2. Greensboro, North Carolina: Imagine Publishing.
- McDermott, Andy (May 1996). "Electronic Rhethoric". Play. No. 7. Bournemouth, England: Paragon Publishing.
- "Magnate". Play. No. 16. Bournemouth, England: Paragon Publishing. February 1997.
- Sargent, Tom (September 1997). "Transport Tycoon Review". Play. No. 24. Bournemouth, England: Paragon Publishing.
- Fish, Elliot (June 1997). "Transport Tycoon - Review". Hyper. No. 44. Sydney, Australia: Next Publishing.
- "Transport Tycoon". Sega Saturn Magazine (in Japanese). No. 41. Japan: SB Creative. 28 November 1997.
- Clayden, Martyn (September 2001). "Transport Tycoon Deluxe". PC Gameplay. No. 16. London, England: Computec Media.
- "Transport Tycoon 3D". Game Players Magazine 遊戲誌 (in Chinese). Vol. 81. Hong Kong. 4 August 1998.
- Baughn, James (2000). "Transport Tycoon Semi-FAQ". transporttycoon.net. Archived from the original on 12 August 2024.
- Sawyer, Chris (2001). "Transport Tycoon Graphics and Their Real Counterparts". United Kingdom: Chris Sawyer Games. Archived from the original on 11 November 2009.
- Wand, Phil (January 2003). "Dual Tycoon". PC Zone. No. 124. London, England: Dennis Publishing.
- "Chris Sawyer's Locomotion for PC Reviews". Metacritic. 9 September 2004. Archived from the original on 16 December 2004.
- Popov, Dmitri (June 2006). "OpenTTD". Tux Magazine. No. 14. Seattle, Washington: SSC Media.
- Schnober, Carsten (June 2009). "Projects on the move" (PDF). Linux Pro Magazine. No. 103. Linux New Media USA, LLC. Archived from the original (PDF) on 24 February 2012.
- Murff, James (21 November 2008). "Freeware Friday: Simutrans". Big Download. GameDaily. Archived from the original on 5 October 2013.
- Rose, Mike (19 July 2013). "Chris Sawyer on his reentry back into video games". Gamasutra. UBM Tech. Archived from the original on 21 July 2013.
- Nelson, Jared (19 September 2013). "'Transport Tycoon' Releasing on iOS and Android October 3rd". TouchArcade. Archived from the original on 5 October 2013.
- Faraday, Owen (20 September 2013). "Enigmatic developer Chris Sawyer on remaking Transport Tycoon for mobile devices". Wired. Condé Nast. Archived from the original on 30 March 2024.
- Whitehead, Dan (3 October 2013). "Transport Tycoon out now on iOS and Android". Eurogamer. Gamer Network. Archived from the original on 4 October 2013.
- Brookes, Tim (14 October 2013). "Transport Tycoon Review: Infrastructure Has Never Been So Fun". MakeUseOf. Archived from the original on 14 October 2013.
- James, Chris (17 April 2014). "The Simpsons: Tapped Out, Angry Birds Friends, Terraria and more get Easter updates". Pocket Gamer. Steel Media. Archived from the original on 8 August 2022.
- Bischoff, Daniel (5 May 2014). "Interview: Transport Tycoon Creator Chris Sawyer Talks Porting to Mobile Platforms". GameRevolution. CraveOnline. Archived from the original on 20 August 2014.
- "John Broomhall remasters Transport Tycoon soundtrack". MCVUK. NewBay Media. 16 June 2014. Archived from the original on 11 November 2020.
- Broomhall, John (22 July 2014). "Full Circle: Videogame Music & All That Jazz". Gamasutra. UBM Tech. Archived from the original on 25 July 2014.
- McGuire, Antonia (2014). "Interview with Chris Sawyer and the development team of Transport Tycoon mobile". Transport Tycoon. Archived from the original on 7 November 2014.
- Parisi, Vinny (9 August 2014). "IGM Interviews – John Broomhall (Transport Tycoon)". Indie Game Magazine. Archived from the original on 24 November 2014.
- Barnes, Adam (February 2015). "In the chair with Chris Sawyer". Retro Gamer. No. 138. United Kingdom: Imagine Publishing.
- Smith, Adam (24 April 2015). "The 50 Best Strategy Games Ever Made". Rock Paper Shotgun. Archived from the original on 9 July 2015.
- Yin-Poole, Wesley (3 March 2016). "A big interview with Chris Sawyer, the creator of RollerCoaster Tycoon". Eurogamer.
- "The 50 Best Free Games On PC - 8". Rock, Paper, Shotgun. 31 October 2016. Archived from the original on 3 November 2016.
- Batchelor, James (September 2014). "The music makers". Develop. No. 153. United Kingdom: NewBay Media.
- "Chris Sawyer (Transport Tycoon/RollerCoaster Tycoon) – Interview". Arcade Attack. 9 August 2018. Archived from the original on 2 December 2023.
- Batchelor, James (4 November 2024). "Atari acquires Transport Tycoon IP". GamesIndustry.biz. Gamer Network. Archived from the original on 4 November 2024.
- Wolens, Joshea (13 March 2026). "You've got a narrow window to nab OpenTTD on Steam for free, because Transport Tycoon Deluxe has just been un-abandonwared by Atari". PC Gamer. Future plc. Archived from the original on 13 March 2026.
- Allsop, Ken (12 March 2026). "30-year-old Transport Tycoon Deluxe is suddenly on Steam and GOG, but it gets in the way of free fan recreation OpenTTD". PCGamesN. NetworkN. Archived from the original on 13 March 2026.
