= Formula One Grand Prix (video game) =

1992 video game

- European cover art
- Developer: MicroProse
- Publisher: MicroProse
- Designer: Geoff Crammond
- Programmer: Geoff Crammond
- Artist: Mark L. Scott
- Composer: John Broomhall
- Platforms: Amiga, Atari ST, MS-DOS
- Release: November 1991 (Amiga/ST); January 1992 (MS-DOS)
- Genre: Racing simulator
- Modes: Single-player, multiplayer

Formula One Grand Prix (known as World Circuit in the United States) is a racing simulator released in 1991 by MicroProse for the Amiga, Atari ST, and MS-DOS created by game designer Geoff Crammond. It is often referred to as Grand Prix 1, MicroProse Grand Prix, or just F1GP. Although the game itself was not affiliated officially with the FIA or any Formula One drivers, team liveries and driver helmets were accurate to represent the 1991 season, but the names were fictional. The game is a simulation of Formula One racing at the time and was noted for its 3D graphics, remarkably high framerate (25 fps) and attention to detail, in particular the player's ability to edit the teams and drivers and set up their car to their own personal specifications. The game was ranked the 27th best game of all time by Amiga Power. Grand Prix's success spawned three sequels, called Grand Prix 2, Grand Prix 3 and Grand Prix 4. A modern rerelease on Steam, titled Geoff Crammond Racing, is planned for 2026.

== Impact on the racing simulation genre ==
After Papyrus' Indianapolis 500: The Simulation, which was released three years earlier, it was the second serious 3D polygon-based racing sim (that is, without textures, except some for the scenery in the PC version). Although Indy 500 was strictly speaking first in pioneering many novel features, F1GP would make a bigger overall impression and impact because it included Formula One race cars, and it offered the player a complete season to compete in, consisting of 16 F1 tracks to Papyrus' 1 track in Indy 500.

When Indy 500 and F1GP appeared, they were the very first to implement something that resembled "real world" racing physics, accurate track modelling and car handling which required skills somewhat similar to real-world driving skills to perform well. Both were also the first to offer meaningful options to tune the behaviour of the cars. Although not quite on the level of later simulations, the most important variables, such as gear ratios, tyre compounds and wing settings were available to tune and, more importantly, proved to make an actual difference when driving. Important were also the functional rearview mirrors and an "instant replay" system with a wide range of adjustable camera settings not seen in other games of the era. In addition, action replays would automatically change camera position and angle according to what was happening on the track, a feature which is unavailable in leading F1 licensed games in 2019.

Despite several continuity hiccups, the game offered a completely new experience for players at the time. The accurately modelled tracks meant that the player could actually recognise their location on the real-life circuit. The detailed physics engine provided a more realistic driving experience than had been seen before, drivers could easily experience the differences in handling depending on how the player entered a corner and how soon or late they accelerated out of it. Unlike other racing simulations of the time, the accuracy of the simulation actually made the 1/1000 of a second chronometer meaningful, as races could be won or lost by a few thousandths of a second. Vitally, the combination of graphics and physics meant players could actually "feel" whether they were driving fast or slow, and could predict how the car would respond. Even details such as tyre wear were modelled throughout the race, qualifying tyres are an extreme example of this: players could not drive more than a couple of laps without losing grip and spinning out on nearly every corner. Together with the 16 tracks and the atmosphere-packed rendition of complete Grand Prix weekends, it made F1GP a favourite with Formula One and racing sim fans for many years, and is still referred to occasionally in current reviews as a classic benchmark.

Starting line of a race (Atari ST).

Two more aspects worth mentioning are the "driving help" features, the ability to drive easily with the keyboard or another controller, and the availability of automatic transmission on most cars. F1GP was built on a system that allowed for an almost perfect learning-curve. Depending on which driving assistances were activated, the game covered playability from a pure arcade-racer level up to the most advanced sim-level available at the time. Players could choose to activate innovative help-functions like "brake-assistance" which would apply the brakes in time for a corner, displaying an "ideal line" on the tarmac to help learning the layout of a track, suggestions for the optimum gear, and others. Perhaps the most impressive achievements in that respect were the "steering help" and "throttle assistance". At the time F1GP was released, analogue steering wheels were far from mainstream. Even joysticks were still mostly digital, and in that respect no different from a keyboard. In order to compensate for the strict on-off nature of digital controllers, Geoff Crammond implemented a method to 'smoothen' the inputs. "Throttle assistance" prevented wheel spin when going on the gas. "Steering help" smoothened the steering actions (as an indication, one would experience cars steering slightly into corners all on their own when this help was activated). This was a subtle exercise, as it could give the impression of cars driving themselves when implemented too strongly. As experience showed, a balance was found, which turned F1GP, and its successors, into a racing game that could be fully enjoyed and played well via digital input devices.

== Limitations ==
Despite these great achievements, F1GP also contained a flaw that was considered irrelevant at first, but would later seriously compromise the potential of the game and its successors.

Geoff Crammond wrote the game long before the era of DirectX, OpenGL and 3D acceleration video cards, so F1GP was built around a proprietary 3D engine that ran in software. This engine was set up in such a way that a fixed frame rate had to be chosen (up to 25.6 frame/s on the PC version), and the game would at all times try to render the specified number of frames.

The result was that the engine would never drop frames when the CPU couldn't handle the rendering in realtime. Instead, gametime itself was slowed down. The software itself provided an option to display the CPU-load, pressing the "o" key. When this was higher than 100%, the game was no longer working in realtime. This would become known in the community as the infamous "slow-motion driving". Since the rendering was obviously dependent on the complexity of the scene, this also meant that one could experience slowdowns of the action only on certain parts of certain tracks, or when there were many cars around (for example at the start).

The game did provide options to eliminate trackside details; (CTRL-D), and in addition, one could also choose a lower framerate to avoid the problem altogether. It also has to be understood that gamers didn't have quite the same expectations of framerates as decades later. The unmatched quality of the 3D representations in itself was enough to impress people, so the actual impact on single-player gaming was not seen as important.

Later in the game's life, this effect became a larger issue. The Grand Prix series never offered solid multiplayer network support, largely due to this design choice. "Real time" in the game could vary between different players, and this conflicted with the all-important synchronization in a multiplayer context. The effect could also be misused to artificially slow down the action, and exploit the extra reaction time which became available to the player that way. Although largely irrelevant if one played the game on one's own, it was problematic for online competitions (see below).

Successors Grand Prix 3 and Grand Prix 4 offered LAN-play and were even hacked to be playable over the Internet, but never performed reasonably. Even when the first boom of 3D acceleration chipsets revolutionized gaming, the concept was not reworked as this would have required a large rewrite of the game engine, and remained a problem (although less so because of the available computer power).

Another exploitable flaw lay in the physics engine, which only took account of horizontal collisions and ignored vertical velocity when calculating damage. Thus, it was possible to use the rumble strips on some tracks to launch the car into the air, bypassing chicanes, and land without damaging the car.

== Historical online gaming and community ==
F1GP was among the first wave of games that had a busy online community. The first competitions were organized via online services like CompuServe in 1993, with driver Ivan establishing a secure presence at the top of leaderboards. F1GP crossed over to the wider Internet once these became mainstream.

The racing didn't actually happen online. F1GP only offered modem play. Thus, the competitions were based on submitted save-games of races and practice laps. These were then used in competitions around complete (or partial) races on the one hand, and so called "Hotlap Competitions" on the other hand. Often, the races followed the schedule of the real world Formula One competition.

The community spawned a host of mods, making the game highly customizable for its time. Liveries, car-performance and the performance of the computer-opponents, camera-settings and many other settings could be edited. First attempts at a track-editor emerged, but this would only become reality after the arrival of the successor Grand Prix 2. In 1994, the Amiga version of F1GP benefitted from a game editor called F1GP-Ed. Whilst this was not the first editor made for the Amiga, it proved to be the most evolved and widely adopted over time.

Due to the possibilities to edit the performance of the car, or to make other aspects of the game favour the player, there were also a lot of utilities to check for cheats. These could handle just about every possible trick that was available, except one: the mentioned "slow-motion driving" effect. The game didn't store the CPU-load data, which could be displayed via a function key, in any save game file. There was no way to exclude the possibility that someone maximized the graphics detail on purpose to force a slowdown of the action.

In practice, F1GP was already an 'older' game when online competitions appeared. This meant that most used computers could easily handle the highest detail at the highest framerate. As such, F1GP-based competitions were actually not hit by the "slow-mo" cheat. Both because the communities were small, and because the CPU-power surplus meant that the effect and its possible usefulness as a way to cheat were less well known.

Its successor Grand Prix 2 though, was notorious for its high CPU-demands. When it appeared, there were no systems available that could handle it at full detail. Most people had difficulty finding a good compromise between details and smooth framerate, and the majority were likely playing in moderate slow-motion without being aware.

When the Grand Prix 2 community materialized and exploded far beyond what F1GP ever offered, it soon became apparent that some participants in the competitions submitted results that were totally unrealistic. Telemetry-data files even showed typical signs of "slow-motion driving" (like impossibly fast gearchange speeds), but there was no way to unambiguously prove it.

This problem kept bugging the community for several years until the utility GP2LAP was developed to monitor and log the CPU load dynamically during the driving.

== Play by Mail Mode ==
A special PBM or Play by Mail mode was introduced in F1GP. Players would choose one of the drivers for the particular race and when their turn was up, save the game onto floppy disk. The disk would then be sent via second class mail to other participants in the event to continue with their turn. This would again be saved and the disk mailed out to the next participant. The PBM mode could extend to include a full seasons championship.

== Release ==
A port of Formula One Grand Prix for the Atari Jaguar was in development and planned to be published by MicroProse, but it was never released.

In December 2025, the current incarnation of MicroProse acquired the rights to the Grand Prix franchise. It announced plans to rerelease all four games, including Formula One Grand Prix, on Steam with original developer Geoff Crammond. Due to the Formula One license being held by Electronic Arts, the game will be rebranded as Geoff Crammond Racing and include fictional sponsors and names. However, Steam Workshop support will be included upon launch.

== Reception ==
Computer Gaming World stated that "World Circuit is a winner, going away at the finish". In 1993, the magazine named it and Star Wars: X-Wing Simulation Game of the Year, and in 1994 reported that of four new racing games, "there is not a World Circuit in the lot". In 1994, PC Gamer UK named it the 29th best computer game of all time. The editors praised Geoff Crammond's past work and called Grand Prix "easily his masterpiece to date". In 1996, Computer Gaming World declared World Circuit the 66th-best computer game ever released. In 1996, GamesMaster ranked the game 25th on their "Top 100 Games of All Time".

Grand Prix and its sequel, collectively, were named the seventh best computer game of all time by PC Gamer UK in 1997.

== Modern-day community and online gaming ==
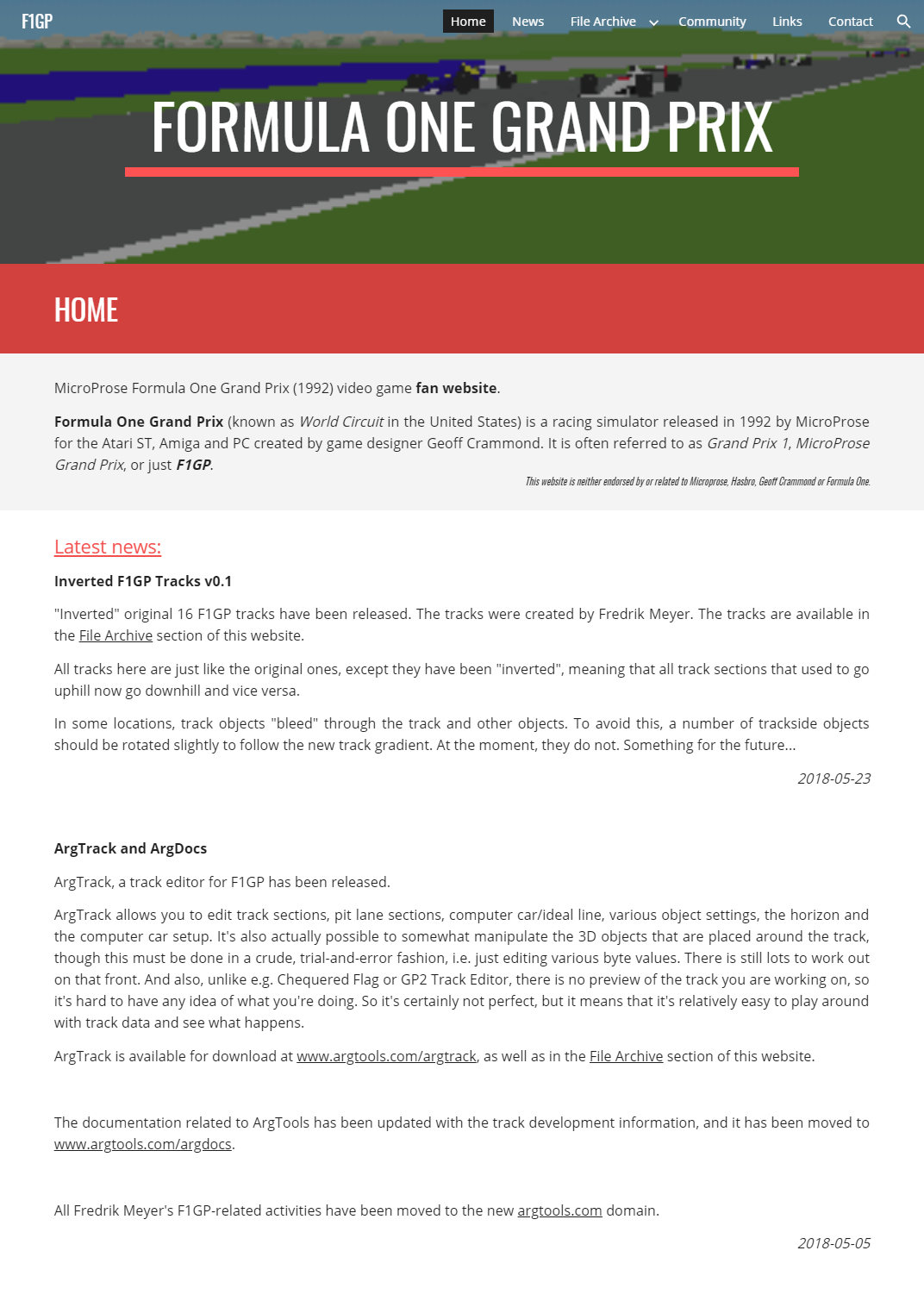
F1GP Site homepage screenshot

Despite the sheer age of the game and the fact that it is both technically and graphically inferior to modern racing simulators, F1GP still has a small community and on-going developments relating to the game. Prior to 2008, the forefront of this community was found at the racing game website SimRacingWorld. A single section was reserved for F1GP where community information and developments, both historical and current were available to anybody interested in the game. The last update to the F1GP section of the site was made in April 2007, and the SimRacingWorld site was shut down in March 2017. The successor to the previously illustrated website was created on 14 January 2007 and it was a Yahoo group. This portal was originally designed to augment SimRacingWorld, promoting community discussion and allowing casual players to remain aware of new developments, but it has since expanded to contain a selection of files. Up to 1 April 2018, all new community developments were made available via this portal, but there was significantly more material on the SimRacingWorld website than on the group and thus it cannot be seen as a complete replacement.

A new F1GP community website was launched on 1 April 2018. The website includes a mirror of all the content that was previously hosted on the SimRacingWorld website and the F1GP Yahoo group portal, as well as new developments. Alongside the website, a new discussion forum was launched. It is a Google group that features a forum and a mailing list. The discussion group is regularly updated with new developments.

One of the focuses of these communities has been on online multiplayer competitions. The ERace is an online multiplayer competition which uses the play by mail mode to facilitate a championship. This contest was announced in October 2011 and is still running as of the current date. Competition updates are regularly posted on the Yahoo group portal for all those interested in the game to read.

In addition to the play by mail mode, a competition using a direct Internet connection between two players has also been tested. The online gaming mode utilizes the game's built-in modem play and the serial port virtualization capabilities of the DOSBox emulator program. This method of playing F1GP over a LAN connection or over the Internet was originally tested in 2011. The method was fully documented on 1 June 2017. With the increasing speed and the decreasing latency of modern network connections, this type of multiplayer games is expected to become more relevant in the future.

== Modern-day developments (2006–) ==
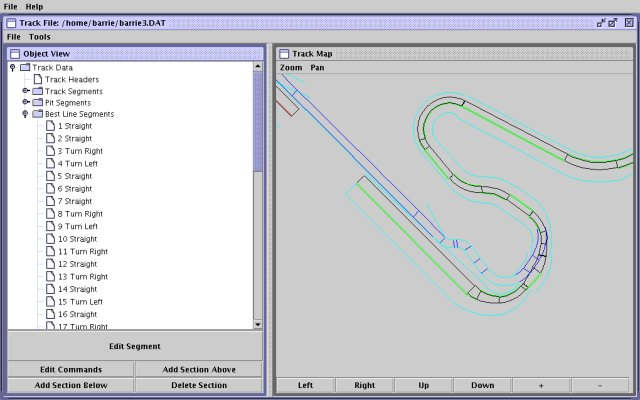
Chequered Flag screenshot

Modern day developments for F1GP have largely have been limited to small-scale community updates and projects. Three developments in particular deserve notable mention. The construction of an open-source game editor "Chequered Flag" is the first of these as it was a project of significant scale, designed to unify previous editing tools and introduce new game modification facilities. Initial progress was good and a number of screenshots were released on 3 September 2006 to give an indication of the editor construction state. This was followed on 23 December by the first release of the editor under version 0.1.0. This early version focused only on providing modification facilities for track editing. A more complete set of editing tools was anticipated, although this remains the only released version as of the current date.

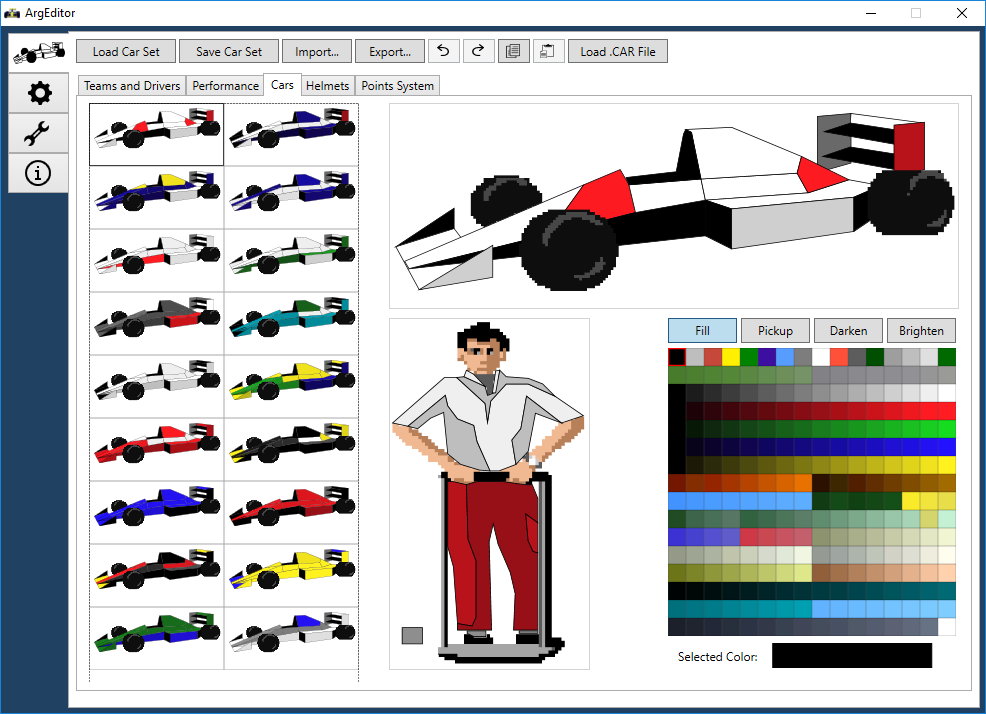
ArgEditor screenshot

The second significant development revolves around the creation of a modern game editor "ArgEditor". It represents a fresh take on an F1GP editor which works on all recent versions of the Windows operating system. It includes almost all of the features of older game editors and expands them with new features. The editor was first introduced on 15 September 2015 under version 0.8. The features of the editor have gradually been expanded and the current stable version 1.0 has been released on 18 February 2018.

The third significant development is the "ArgTrack" track editor. It is a simple, semi-functional track editor, aimed at simplifying the track editing process. The editor was first introduced on 2 May 2018 under version 0.1.0.23.
