= Stunt Car Racer =

1989 video game

- Cover art by Steinar Lund
- Developer: Creative Assembly (MS-DOS)
- Publisher: MicroProse
- Designer: Geoff Crammond
- Platforms: Commodore 64, Amiga, Amstrad CPC, Atari ST, MS-DOS, ZX Spectrum
- Release: 1989: Amiga, ST, C64, MS-DOS, Spectrum; 1990: CPC
- Genre: Racing
- Modes: Single-player, multiplayer

Stunt Car Racer (published as Stunt Track Racer in the US) is a racing video game developed by Geoff Crammond. Versions for the Amiga, Atari ST, Commodore 64, MS-DOS, and ZX Spectrum were published in 1989 by MicroProse, under their MicroStyle and MicroPlay labels in the UK and in the US, respectively. An Amstrad CPC port followed in 1990. Two players race each other on an elevated track, with ramps they must correctly drive off as the main obstacle.

The game was released to critical acclaim. The Commodore 64 version's use of 3D vector graphics was met with critical enthusiasm, which was unusual for a game for that platform.

== Gameplay ==
Atari ST screenshot of the gameplay. (The Amiga version is graphically identical.)

The game differs from other racing games in that the races take place on an elevated race track, with nothing to stop the player from accidentally driving off the side. Most race tracks in the game have gaps in them, which players can fall into. If this occurs then the player's vehicle is hoisted back onto the track (by a nearby crane), costing valuable time. Turbo can be used to make a car go faster, but it can only be used for a limited amount of time in each race.

The single-player game consists of a league table which is split into four divisions of three drivers each, making a total of twelve racers including the human player. There are two racing tracks in each division making it a total of eight tracks in the game. The tracks in division four (the first division) are easy, but the tracks get progressively more difficult and dangerous with each division. The player's objective is to reach, and subsequently win, division one. There are four races in a season, and each driver will race the other two drivers in both of the tracks in the division. Each race is run over three laps. Two points are awarded to the winner of each race and one point is awarded to the racer with the fastest lap time. At the end of each season, the top racer of each division is promoted to the next higher division while the driver in last place will be relegated.

Damage to the player's car occurs when the player lands too hard on the track after driving over a crest too fast, crashes into a wall, falls into a gap in the track, or hits the opponent's car. If the damage, which is indicated by a crack in the frame at the top of the screen, reaches a certain level, the vehicle is deemed to be wrecked and the driver loses the race instantly. A particularly hard crash will also make holes representing structural damage appear in the frame above the windshield. Holes remain on the car for the rest of the season and increase the rate at which the crack in the frame advances.

The player can compete against computer opponents or, at least on the Atari ST and Amiga versions, with another player using two computers connected via a null modem cable, each with their own TV or monitor. Such direct head-to-head racing between players is also made possible by pairing an Amiga computer with an Atari ST computer via the cable.

== Development and release ==
British developer Geoff Crammond spent three years developing Stunt Car Racer, his second car-based title after Revs in 1985. The project started off as a land-roving simulator for Commodore 64 where one drives on randomly undulating terrain. The physics were then programmed for the car's suspension, and after testing the game himself, Crammond found driving off ramps the most enjoyable. He then added in more ramps on an even stretch of the landscape, but had difficulty locating them. He therefore placed the ramps on a track, which he then elevated to avoid driving onto the field. The track's corners were banked to emphasize the game's speed and the ramps as its main challenge. It was suggested after a magazine interview with Crammond that he was inspired by the arcade game Hard Drivin', but he said that he had seen it only in the final months of his game's development and that it had no impact on its outcome.

Visually, the difference between the 8-bit and Amiga and Atari ST releases is that the latter use a system for plotting polygons instead of a solid fill technique. Another key difference is that besides racing head-to-head on two linked computers, an Amiga can be connected to an Atari ST computer via the same RS-232 serial port on both machines for cross-platform play, owing to Crammond's experience with outputting data for his other game, Aviator, on the BBC Micro. MicroProse considered adding up to eight concurrent racers and an editor for creating tracks, but ruled in favor of head-to-head racing and against the latter because doing either would have caused the gameplay to suffer severe stutters. The ZX Spectrum and Amstrad CPC ports of Stunt Car Racer were programmed by Pete Cooke, and the MS-DOS version was programmed by Tim Ansell. The Commodore 64 version was later modified for use without a keyboard. This version was in the Power Play cartridge together with Rick Dangerous and MicroProse Soccer, released for the Commodore 64 Games System. The last platforms to be ported to were the Amiga and the Atari ST, both programmed by Crammond. A port of Stunt Car Racer for the Jaguar was rumored to be in development, but it was never released.

A long-awaited sequel, Stunt Car Racer Pro, was announced in April 2003, but it never came to fruition.

== Reception ==
Reception

Review scores
Publication	Score
ACE	941/1000 (C64)
Amstrad Action	96%
Crash	87%
Computer and Video Games	93% (Amstrad)
Joystick	80% (DOS)
Sinclair User	80%
The Games Machine (UK)	91% (C64); 90% (Amstrad)
Your Sinclair	85%
Zero	82% (DOS)
Zzap!64	94% (C64); 92% (AMI)
Commodore Computing International	80% (C64)

The Commodore 64, Amstrad, Amiga, and Atari ST versions of the game received critical acclaim. Zzap!64 was particularly enthusiastic about the Commodore 64 version. In its review, it lauded the game's concept and the quality of its 3D vector graphics. One of its reviewers, though preferring to race against more than a single opponent directly, called it the most remarkable Commodore 64 program. ACE magazine, who was equally enthusiastic, also extolled the version's vector graphics and the speed at which they are loaded as unparalleled in Commodore 64 gaming. Commodore Computing International also praised the use of vector graphics on a brand of computer not well recognised for its library of decent 3D games, as well as the controls and the difficulty, and described the game as a hybrid of Hard Drivin' and Power Drift, with a few ideas of its own. Amstrad Action defined it as a "truly stunning racing sim" and one of the best ever on Amstrad CPC. The Games Machine felt the color selection used for the Amstrad port was gaudy and that with the tracks being of the same colour as the ground and their banked corners lacking shading, distinguishing the road from the ground could be troublesome, but praised its addictive, "hair-raising" gameplay.

In comparison, reviews for the Spectrum and DOS ports were generally favorable. Crash praised the graphics and the entertainment, but criticised the limiting number of tracks. On the DOS side, Zero lamented the port's lack of track detail and limited color palette, but otherwise found that it still had the pace and gameplay that was as exhilarating as the Amiga and ST versions. Joystick praised the animation, but thought that the landscape was bland.

Editors of Your Sinclair voted Stunt Car Racer as the 1989 game of the year. ACE listed it as one of the five greatest racing games of all time and Top Gear the 45th best racing game. Amiga Power, CU Amiga, and Your Sinclair ranked it respectively the 10th, the 11th, and the 85th best game of all time for the platforms they covered, and Amiga Format likewise named it one of the 15 best Amiga games. Several publications consider it to be one of the greatest video games of all time; Edge listed it as the 54th best game in 2000, Stuff the 77th in 2008, and Polygon the 355th in 2017.
