= Monaco Grand Prix: Racing Simulation 2 =

1998 video game

- European Windows cover art
- Developer: Ubi Soft Paris
- Publisher: Ubi Soft
- Platforms: Windows, PlayStation, Nintendo 64, Dreamcast
- Release: 1998: Windows; PAL: Late 1998; NA: May 21, 1999; PlayStation; NA: June 30, 1999; PAL: July 1999; Nintendo 64; PAL: June 1999; NA: September 1999; Dreamcast; NA: September 9, 1999; EU: October 14, 1999
- Genre: Racing
- Modes: Single-player, multiplayer

Monaco Grand Prix: Racing Simulation 2, also known simply as Monaco Grand Prix or Racing Simulation: Monaco Grand Prix, is a Formula One racing game developed and published by Ubisoft for Windows, Nintendo 64, PlayStation, and Dreamcast. It was released between 1998 and 1999. A sequel, Racing Simulation 3, was released in 2002.

== Gameplay ==
Cockpit view (Windows)

The game is based on the Formula One World Championship but does not have the license to use official driver names or cars. Instead, the developers acquired a license from the Automobile Club de Monaco and a license to feature Formula One's official sponsors, such as Schweppes and Castrol, adding to the game's authenticity. The game is unrelated to Sega's Monaco GP series.

A sequel to F1 Racing Simulation, it includes 17 authentic tracks, 11 teams, and 22 drivers. Although the teams are not officially licensed, the game utilizes the Monaco license. Players can choose from 22 camera views. Telemetry is stored and analyzed similarly to Grand Prix 2, and the game's physics are designed to be realistic.

The game offers eight different modes, including a new career mode where the player starts with a lower-tier team and must perform well to earn a spot with more competitive teams. There are also scenarios that recreate key moments from specific drivers' careers. Returning from the previous game are modes such as Time Attack, a full championship, and a 1950s retro mode. Additionally, a track editor is included, allowing players to create their own custom tracks.

== Reception ==
Reception

Aggregate score
Aggregator	Score			
Aggregator	Dreamcast	N64	PC	PS
GameRankings	71%	75%	77%	76%

Review scores
Publication	Score			
Publication	Dreamcast	N64	PC	PS
CNET Gamecenter	9/10	N/A	N/A	7/10
Computer Gaming World	N/A	N/A	4/5	N/A
Electronic Gaming Monthly	8/10	7.125/10 (Note: Two critics of Electronic Gaming Monthly gave the Nintendo 64 version each a score of 8/10, one gave it 6.5/10, and the other gave it 6/10.)	N/A	7.25/10 (Note: Two critics of Electronic Gaming Monthly gave the PlayStation version each a score of 8/10, and the rest gave it each a score of 6.5/10.)
Eurogamer	7/10	N/A	N/A	N/A
Game Informer	7/10	N/A	N/A	N/A
GameFan	71% (Note: In GameFan's viewpoint of the Dreamcast version, one critic gave it 69, and the other 72.)	N/A	N/A	68% (Note: In GameFan's early viewpoint of the PlayStation version, one critic gave it 62, and the other 73.)
GameSpot	7.4/10	6.9/10	N/A	7.5/10
IGN	8.5/10	7.8/10	N/A	8/10

The game received "favorable" reviews on all platforms except for the Dreamcast version, which garnered "average" reviews, according to the review aggregation website GameRankings. PC Gamer awarded the PC version universal acclaim, while PC Accelerator provided a favorable review months before its U.S. release. An unnamed reviewer from Next Generation gave the N64 version a positive review, praising its gameplay, the number of tracks and cars, graphics, physics, and the two-player screen mode. However, four issues later, Chris Carla of the same magazine (now labeled NextGen) described the Dreamcast version as solid but stated that Ubisoft's title Speed Devils was superior. In Japan, where the Dreamcast version was released on March 11, 1999, followed by the PlayStation version on September 30, Famitsu scored it 31 out of 40 for the former, and 26 out of 40 for the latter.

Pete Wilton of Official UK PlayStation Magazine rated the PlayStation version seven out of ten, noting some minor issues but calling Monaco GP better than F1 '98 while considering it inferior to the latter's previous title. Computer Games Strategy Plus gave the PC version four and a half stars out of five, praising its graphics, accurate driving model, and multiplayer options. Edge also rated the PC version seven out of ten in its December 1998 issue, despite noting some technical issues. Seven issues later, the same magazine rated the Japanese Dreamcast import six out of ten, criticizing it as essentially the same version without enhancements, but was generally positive overall.

AllGame rated the Dreamcast, PC, and PlayStation versions each three stars out of five. Brad Cook commented on the Dreamcast version, stating, "I have to give this game a higher rating than I thought I would simply because I know it will appeal to its intended audience. Just stay away if you want arcade-style action." Michael L. House noted that the PC version "crosses the finish line in fairly good shape." He expressed his belief that games do not have to fit exclusively into a restrictive "either/or" category but can occupy niches on a sliding scale of desirability. He added, "Just as those gamers who do themselves an injustice by adamantly shouting there is only one viable golf simulation because of a strict, narrow mindset, so too will racing fans unwilling to experience alternatives in the Formula 1 racing genre." Jonathan Sutyak also provided a positive review of the PlayStation version.

In an early review, Boba Fatt of GamePro described the European PlayStation version as "the slowpoke of the PlayStation superhighway". (Note: GamePro rated the PlayStation version 2.5/5 for graphics, 2/5 for sound and fun factor, and 3.5/5 for control in an early review.) Vicious Sid commented on the European Nintendo 64 version, stating, "Sim fans dying for a break from the daunting F1 World Grand Prix will likely flock to Monaco Grand Prix, but the more accessible Rush 2: Extreme Racing USA remains the best choice for armchair drivers". (Note: GamePro awarded the Nintendo 64 version three 3.5/5 ratings for graphics and fun factor, 3/5 for sound, and 4/5 for control in an early review.) Air Hendrix remarked on the same console version, saying it "delivers an impressive collection of sixteen tracks from around the world and eleven different racing teams, each including multiple drivers. Unfortunately, this only truly appeals to a serious race fan—if you don't know a Zaccitan from a Humigger, this probably won't get you very excited". (Note: GamePro assigned the Nintendo 64 version three 3.5/5 ratings for graphics, control, and fun factor, and 3/5 for sound in another review.) Mark Asher characterized the PC version as "a superior racing experience that really captures the feel of being in a Formula 1 car". (Note: GamePro gave the PC version two 4/5 ratings for graphics and sound, and two 4.5/5 ratings for control and fun factor.) Air Hendrix mentioned the Dreamcast version in one review, stating, "As the white flag drops, Monaco Grand Prix has a lot more under its hood than Flag to Flag – but that also means it has a lot more sim-style realism to contend with. If that suits your fancy, you'll never look back, but lots of gamers will prefer Flag's lighter side and stronger two-player game". (Note: GamePro rated the Dreamcast version 4/5 for graphics, 3/5 for sound and fun factor, and 3.5/5 for control in one review.) In another review, iBot stated about the same console version, "With the many different race games geared for several different audiences coming out at the Dreamcast launch, Monaco is geared towards the serious racing enthusiasts, while more fun can quickly be had with Sega Sports' Flag to Flag." (Note: GamePro rated the Dreamcast version 4/5 for graphics, 3/5 for sound and control, and 3.5/5 for fun factor in another review.)

Jes Bickham of N64 Magazine rated the N64 version 87%, while Cam Shea of Hyper assigned it an 83%. Electronic Gaming Monthly and Nintendo Power provided average reviews for the European version months before its U.S. release. Additionally, Jackson Goethe-Snape of Hyper rated the PC version at 79%, while Eliot Fish gave the Dreamcast version a score of 80%.

The PC version was a runner-up for Computer Games Strategy Plus' 1999 "Racing Game of the Year" award, which ultimately went to Dirt Track Racing. The staff noted that the game's graphics and excellent vehicle physics were hallmarks of the series.
