= Revs (video game) =

1985 Formula Three simulation game

- Cover art for the original Acornsoft release
- Developer: Geoff Crammond
- Publishers: Acornsoft; Firebird; Superior Software
- Platforms: BBC Micro, Commodore 64
- Release: 1985: BBC; 1985: C64
- Genre: Vehicle simulation
- Mode: Single-player

Revs is a 1985 Formula Three simulation written initially for the BBC Micro by game designer Geoff Crammond and published by Acornsoft that is notable for its realistic simulation of the sport and as a precursor to its author's later work on Formula One Grand Prix and its sequels. Technical consultancy was provided by Formula Three driver David Hunt, whom Acornsoft's parent company Acorn Computers had sponsored during the British Formula Three Championship.

== Gameplay ==
Player wing settings

Unlike most contemporaneous racing games, Revs features selection of aerodynamic settings by the player and a full three-dimensional environment. The player is allowed to drive the wrong way around the track or even away from it completely. Unusual for the time, the track and terrain are not planar, but undulations in the ground are reproduced. The game was noted for its use of the BBC's hardware in achieving its display: such was the difficulty in squeezing the game into the BBC's limited memory, part of the game code actually occupies part of the screen memory. Whilst this would ordinarily be distractingly visible, timer-based manipulation of the BBC's display palette has the effect of turning all the 'code pixels' blue, thus hiding it in the game's sky.

Gameplay view from driver's seat

The game features rudimentary AI for control of the opponents' cars, which are driven by individual characters with humorous names. Johnny Turbo, Max Throttle and Gloria Slap are usually the fastest opponents, whereas Miles Behind is often the slowest.

The BBC Micro version release features Silverstone as its one track. There is also an expansion pack, Revs 4 Tracks (released in 1985), which adds Brands Hatch, Donington Park, Oulton Park and Snetterton to make a total of five.

== Reception ==
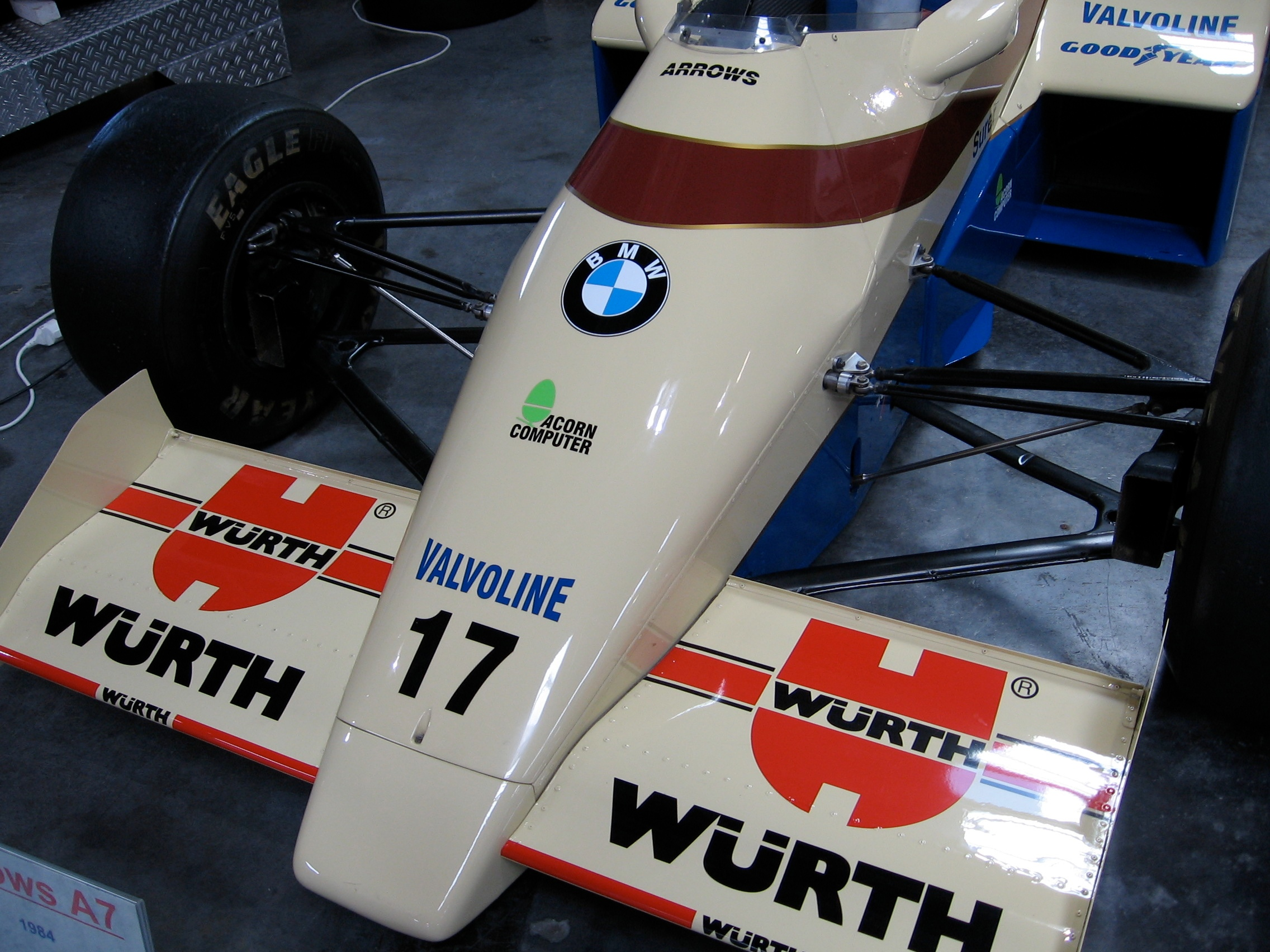
Car showing Acorn's logo, on display at the Sinsheim Auto & Technik Museum.

Acorn's marketing for the game included racing sponsorship, with driver David Hunt being sponsored in the 1984 British Formula Three Championship Acorn Computer European Trophy.

== Legacy ==
=== Enhanced release ===
An enhanced edition of the BBC version was released in 1986 by Superior Software/Acornsoft as Revs plus Revs 4 Tracks which included all 5 tracks. The enhanced edition also included a 'steering assist' driving aid "designed to improve control of the car when using keys or a digital joystick".

=== Ports ===
Revs was later ported to the Commodore 64, with the standard game providing the Silverstone and Brands Hatch tracks. The '4 Tracks' pack for the Commodore (released under the title Revs +) included the Nürburgring, Oulton Park, Snetterton and Donington Park circuits.
