= Birds of Prey (video game) =

1991 video game

- Developer: Argonaut Software
- Publisher: Electronic Arts
- Platforms: Amiga, MS-DOS
- Release: EU: 1991
- Genre: Flight simulation
- Mode: Single-player

Birds of Prey is a flight simulator for the Amiga and IBM PC compatibles developed by Argonaut Software and published in 1992 by Electronic Arts. It includes a wide variety of NATO and Warsaw Pact aircraft and their respective ordnance as well as 12 different mission profiles. The game takes place on a large map consisting of several land areas separated by the sea. The plot revolves around a military conflict between two sides that have three air bases and two aircraft carriers each.

== Reception ==
Computer Gaming World offered two opinions of Birds of Prey. One criticized the game's lack of realism and flawed targeting, while the other favorably cited the wide variety of aircraft and recommended it to action-oriented flight gamers. In a 1994 survey of wargames, the magazine gave the title two stars out of five, saying "the various aircraft have suspiciously similar flight characteristics and instrumentation".
