= Geoff Crammond =

British computer game designer and programmer

- Born: Geoffrey James Crammond; December 1953

Geoff Crammond (b. December 1953) is a British computer game designer and programmer who specialises in motor racing games. A former defence industry systems engineer, Crammond claims to have had little interest in motor racing before programming his first racing game, Revs, back in 1985. As a consequence of that project he became a fan of Formula One motor racing. At the end of the 1980s, this interest, combined with the improving capabilities of home computers, inspired him to specialise in programming Formula One racing simulations.

== Games ==
One of his early releases was Aviator, a Spitfire simulator released by Acornsoft for the BBC Micro in March 1984. Having been motivated to make his own flight simulator from the hardware level upwards, Crammond identified the possibility of using one of the increasingly sophisticated home computers, if only "to cannibalise it". Recognising the potential of the BBC Micro, he ordered one in 1981 and, upon receiving it six months later, then set about familiarising himself with the system, taking a detour to produce a Space Invaders clone, Super Invaders, which was accepted for publication and sold by Acornsoft. Discussion with Acornsoft about his plans for making a flight simulator led to the Aviator concept, and the program itself was written in a period of nine months.

Although displayed in only four colours and having few of the features of modern simulators for more powerful computers, Aviator was of unparalleled quality at the time of its release, with a realistic flight model that included g-forces that could tear the wings off in a dive. This would be accompanied by a continuous, high-pitched beep. The wings could be restored by removing the physical pressure on the airframe which was causing the flight envelope to be exceeded. Generally, this could be achieved by returning the joystick to a neutral centre position. The landscape was crudely rendered, and was basically a flat surface. Some scenic features were drawn as vector graphics, including low hills, fields, a lake, a suspension bridge over a river, and a small town which comprised a cluster of three buildings. Bonus points could be earned for flying under the bridge or along the main street of the town at a lower altitude than the buildings. Double points were earned for performing these stunts upside down. The game also had a shoot-'em-up mode in which alien vessels were seeded in the fields, feeding on the crops and growing until they could become airborne, at which point they headed for the town. The player could destroy the aliens on the ground as they fed, or (for reduced points) tackle them in the air (the aliens were agile but could not return fire). If an alien reached the town, the game was lost. A minor bug permitted the plane to be landed upside down without consequence, so long as the landing gear had been deployed.

Although better known for his Formula One simulation games on the PC and Amiga platforms, his first motor racing simulator was Revs, a Formula Three simulator that debuted on the BBC Micro platform in 1985. The BBC version of Revs featured just one track, the Silverstone Circuit, but the realistic implementation of motor racing physics and artificial intelligence of the computer-controlled components gave the game enormous depth and replayability. An enhanced edition of the BBC version was released in 1985, called Revs 4 Tracks which included Brands Hatch, Donington Park, Oulton Park and Snetterton race tracks.

A Commodore 64 version of the game, entitled Revs Plus, was released in 1986, which added the Brands Hatch track to the game. Later the Commodore 64 version added the Nürburgring to this list to continue the "4 Tracks" theme as Brands Hatch had already been included with the initial REVS Plus release. The Nürburgring was chosen as its new layout had recently been completed and computer-based design data was available.

The Sentinel was published by Firebird on the BBC Micro in 1986. It was a 3D puzzle game, featuring ten thousand levels, in which the player had to manoeuvre his way through a landscape of cliffs, trees and boulders to topple the ominous Sentinel. The game was a critical and commercial success. Conversions for the ZX Spectrum, C64, Amiga, Amstrad CPC, Atari ST and PC soon followed. A sequel, Sentinel Returns, was published by Psygnosis in 1998 on the PC and PlayStation platforms.

Crammond's attention later returned to motor racing simulators. Stunt Car Racer was a slightly offbeat driving simulation which rewarded the player for performing outrageous stunts on a number of elevated, roller coaster-like courses. Although less serious in tone than his previous simulators, the game nevertheless used an impressive physics engine to offer a realistic driving experience. The game enjoyed cult status among many Amiga and Atari ST gamers. Since the early 1990s, Crammond's primary focus has been on developing the award-winning Formula One Grand Prix series of games. The first game in the series, F1GP (aka World Circuit in the USA), was released by MicroProse on the Amiga in 1991 and serves as a spiritual successor to Revs. Around this time Amiga Power magazine began referring to Crammond as Sir Geoff, a running gag which has caught on with many others. The game was an instant success, earning a conversion to the Atari ST and PC platforms, but the inevitable sequel, Grand Prix 2, remained in development for three years before eventually being released on the PC in 1996.

Grand Prix 3 was released on the PC in 2000 and was well-received by fans and critics alike. Crammond's series now had considerable competition from other developers, particularly Psygnosis/Sony, who were licensed by the FIA to produce the official Formula One gaming titles. Grand Prix 4 was released on the PC in 2002 and is generally regarded as the most accurate game in the series. After Grand Prix 4 there were rumours that Crammond's next game would be Stunt Car Racer Pro, an updated version of his classic game. The rumours were later confirmed with an announcement that he was co-operating with Lost Toys studios. Lost Toys studios closed in late 2003. At the beginning of 2005, the game was rumoured to be cancelled.

Crammond's most recent release is still GP4 (2002), which is still supported by fans with annual mods, in spite of MicroProse's closure in 2001. Crammond has since maintained a low profile, but continues to engage in various programming projects.

In 2018, Australian developer David Lagettie bought the MicroProse brand and began publishing games under that name. In December 2025, MicroProse announced that it would republish all four of Crammond's Grand Prix games; the games are set for release on Steam in 2026.

=== Released ===
- 1982 – Super Invaders (BBC)
- 1983 – Aviator (BBC)
- 1985 – Revs (BBC)
- 1985 – Revs 4 Tracks (BBC)
- 1986 – Revs Plus (C64)
- 1986 – The Sentinel (Amiga, Amstrad CPC, Atari ST, BBC, C64, PC, ZX Spectrum)
- 1989 – Stunt Car Racer (Amiga, Atari ST, C64, PC, ZX Spectrum, Amstrad CPC)
- 1991 – Formula One Grand Prix (Amiga, Atari ST, PC)
- 1996 – Grand Prix 2 (PC)
- 2000 – Grand Prix 3 (PC)
- 2001 – Grand Prix 3 2000 (PC)
- 2002 – Grand Prix 4 (PC)

=== Cancelled ===
- Grand Prix 4 for Xbox
- Stunt Car Racer Pro (PC)
