= Chris Sawyer's Locomotion =

2004 video game

- Publisher: Atari Interactive
- Designer: Chris Sawyer
- Artist: Simon Foster
- Composers: Allister Brimble; John Broomhall; David Punshon; Scott Joplin
- Platform: Microsoft Windows
- Release: September 2004
- Genre: Business simulation
- Modes: Single-player, multiplayer

Chris Sawyer's Locomotion (often simply Locomotion) is a video game designed and programmed by independent game developer Chris Sawyer, and published by Atari Interactive in September 2004. The game is a simulation game in which the player takes on the role of a transportation company manager, building transportation networks and managing the flow of goods and passengers in order to compete against rival companies. Sawyer independently developed the game over nine years from the 1990s as a "spiritual successor to Transport Tycoon", with the game featuring "fundamentally the same" gameplay but with "differences in detail, scale and presentation" to update and refine the features that Sawyer "wanted to get right" in its predecessor.

Locomotion was released to mixed reviews, with critics feeling the game's presentation was dated for its time and was less user-friendly than its predecessors. Following an extended hiatus from the video game industry, the game's engine was used as the basis for a 2013 mobile iteration of Transport Tycoon for Android and iOS. Locomotion has also since received an unofficial, open source reimplementation, known as OpenLoco.

== Gameplay ==
A screenshot of gameplay in Locomotion

Locomotion is an isometric transport simulation game using a refined version of the Transport Tycoon engine first used for RollerCoaster Tycoon 2. The game involves the management of a transport company to construct a network of trains, trams, trucks, buses, aeroplanes, and ships to co-ordinate a supply chain of resources, including minerals, goods, and passengers across industries to towns and cities. Players start with a bank loan and must build profitable networks to facilitate the supply and demand of resources to earn money and expand their company. To transport resources, players build networks between stations using road, rail, ports, and airports, and purchase vehicles of varying cost, speed, and reliability to travel between them. Players create profitable networks by transporting goods and passengers in efficient networks across greater distances, whilst minimising transport costs.

Locomotion contains over 40 scenarios in which players compete with rival companies to create successful networks and meet various objectives, such as finishing in a certain ranking in the list of companies, or transporting a specific amount of cargo of a resource. Scenarios are based on five difficulty levels: Beginner, Easy, Medium, Challenging and Expert, and are based on fictional and real-world locations, including the United States, Switzerland and the United Kingdom. The game also contains a scenario editor to allow players to create and modify the game's scenarios and create custom maps. Scenarios in Locomotion also supports online multiplayer for two players, which plays identically to single player scenarios except with minor restrictions to speed controls. The game also features a hidden train driving mode in which players can perform a keyboard command to assume control over the trains in the game.

== Development and release ==
Locomotion was developed by game developer Chris Sawyer, who had previously developed the simulation game Transport Tycoon. Sawyer intended Locomotion to be a "spiritual successor" to Transport Tycoon, and had worked to complete such a game as early as 1996, but did not make a serious effort to create a successor until the release of RollerCoaster Tycoon 2 in 2002. Sawyer also cited the desire to modernise Transport Tycoon to harness the increased technical capabilities of computers at the time, including greater processing power and memory, that allowed a game that "could handle many more transport vehicles, larger maps, and multiple-level bridges and tunnels instead of just land-based construction," and "more detailed and smoother animation as well as the multi-level three-dimensional transport routes I wanted to include in previous games." Sawyer created the game independently, responsible for the "design, programming, project management and research" himself, with assistance from a graphic artist and musician. Sawyer reflected that Locomotion was created using "large parts of the programming" for RollerCoaster Tycoon 2, which was developed during the same time.

Locomotion was released in September 2004, following a preview by Atari at E3 in May of that year. The game is the only title released by Sawyer to use his name in the title of the game. Sawyer stated that the use of his name in the title of Locomotion was used to address "possible legal issues with using the name on its own...which also suited the PR people as they felt it might make it easier to promote the game having my name prominently displayed." Sawyer stated that Locomotion was the game he was "most proud of" creating, assessing the game as "the best-written piece of programming I've ever done," citing the plug-in and multiplayer capabilities of the game.

Following an extended hiatus from development, in 2013, Sawyer released an Android and iOS version of Transport Tycoon, with the game's graphics and primarily based on the design of Locomotion. Sawyer expressed the desire to make the game based on the tactical challenge of running the game on a mobile device, stating "the tactile nature of interactive isometric simulation-strategy games really suits the touch screen interface." On 17 March 2015, Locomotion was re-released through digital distribution on Steam and gog.com.

== Reception ==
Reception

Review scores
Publication	Score
Computer Gaming World	1.5/5
GameSpot	6.8/10
GameSpy	2/5
IGN	5.8/10
Jeuxvideo.com	3/20
PC Zone	50% / 37% / 62%

Reviews of Locomotion were generally mixed, with review aggregator Metacritic stating reviews were "mixed or average" with an average rating of 59%. Many critics compared the game unfavorably to its predecessors, Rollercoaster Tycoon and Transport Tycoon, with minimal improvements to the presentation, game mechanics and user interface. Indicative of this reception was Dan Adams of IGN, who stated "Chris Sawyer released Transport Tycoon back in 1994. This game is the same game, but worse for the fact that it hasn't evolved into anything better in a full ten years and that other transport and industry games have come out that have been a thousand times better than it for the fact that they had functional interfaces that provided information and easy construction."

Several critics expressed that Locomotion's visual presentation was dated at the time of release. Writing for IGN, Dan Adams stated that the game suffered from a "severe lack of artistic direction", stating "buildings and towns are depressingly simple and boring, there's no blending of texture terrains, and very little detail." Allen Rausch of GameSpy critiqued the game's visuals as "remarkably unattractive", critiquing the game's "boxy pseudo-modern architecture (as) just plain boring to look at." Many critics unfavorably compared the game's visual presentation to its predecessors, with PC Zone stating the game had "the same look and identical interface to that from Rollercoaster Tycoon, but here the colours appear drab, the maps flatter and some of the tiles don't appear to connect all that well." Sawyer himself observed that the release received a "quiet start" in acceptance that the game did not "have the flashy 3D graphics of most modern games", speculating that "it's much easier to advertise and promote something good looking rather than something which plays well."

Critics also identified the game's interface and navigation as a hindrance to gameplay. Writing for Computer Gaming World, Di Luo stated the game's presentation was "cumbersome", observing that the game's "map rotation isn't effective enough to let you see everything...finding the correct sources of and destinations for raw materials can be infuriatingly difficult." Dan Adams of IGN described the game as an "exercise in frustration, (with) a frustration informational interface (and) frustrating construction interface", stating "sorting through (maps) and finding the information you want can be a chore" and "it's really difficult to judge where tracks and roads need to go to connect." Jason Ocampo of GameSpot stated construction was largely "trial and error" and a "frustrating experience...mainly due to the fact that you can't completely undo the mistakes you'll often make."

=== Retrospective reception ===
Retrospective assessments of Locomotion have been more forgiving than contemporary reviews, whilst noting the game was a disappointment. Retro Gamer stated that the game was "the most complete version of Transport Tycoon, even if it wasn't named as such. It wasn't as well received...with most complaints surrounding the UI, but a heap of improvements made for a solid addition to the concept all the same." In a retrospective of the Tycoon series of games developed by Sawyer, Connor Christie of Pocket Tactics stated "Locomotion didn't prove to be the reinvigoration of the Transport Tycoon Sawyer was hoping for." Owen Faraday of Wired similarly stated the game "drew a tepid reception from critics and fans alike, perhaps a sign that Sawyer's full attention couldn't be brought to bear on the (game)."

== Legacy ==
Locomotion was Sawyer's final game for some time. Sawyer was in legal dispute with Atari from 2005 to 2008 over unpaid royalties for his work. This dispute, and the poor reception for Locomotion led him to depart the industry for a decade. He later returned to work on mobile ports of his earlier work.

=== OpenLoco ===
OpenLoco
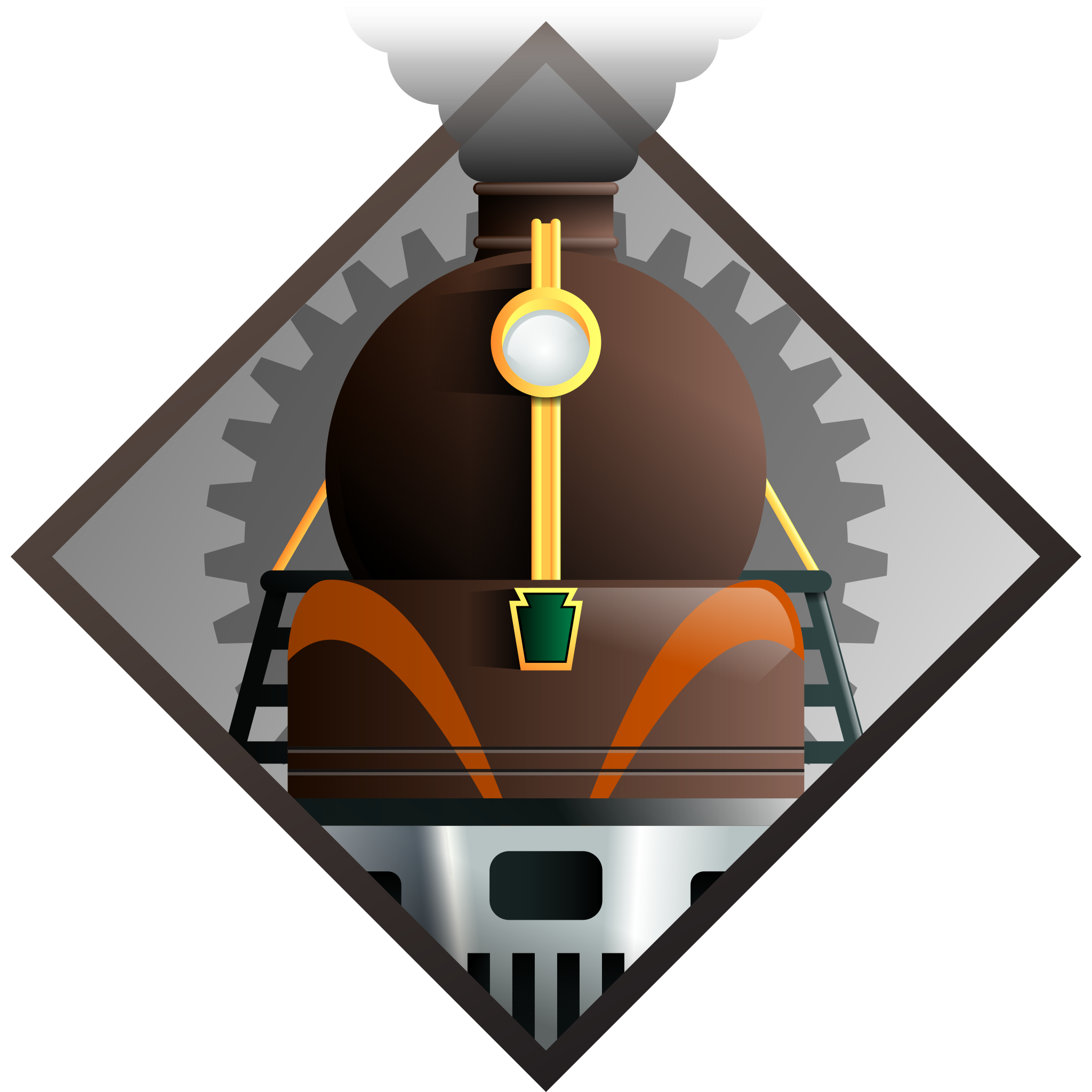
- Platforms: Windows, Linux, and macOS

In January 2018, the open-source project OpenLoco was launched to enhance the gameplay of Locomotion. The project was founded by a group of developers from OpenRCT2, a similar open source reimplementation of RollerCoaster Tycoon 2. The OpenLoco team aimed to fix bugs, translate the game to more languages, support custom resolutions including 4K, and operating systems such as macOS and Linux. The project also sought to minimise limitations in the original game and give greater options for gameplay features, such as disabling vehicle breakdowns and unlocking building options. By 2021 OpenLoco was "getting into a pretty good state" according to Gaming on Linux, with multiplayer support in development. The project was praised by Game Pressure in 2024, which described it as an "unofficial remaster".
