= Sentinel Returns =

1998 video game

- European cover art
- Developer: Hookstone
- Publisher: Psygnosis
- Composer: John Carpenter
- Platforms: Windows, PlayStation
- Release: UK: 14 August 1998; NA: 28 September 1998
- Genre: Puzzle
- Modes: Single-player, multiplayer

Sentinel Returns is a video game developed by Hookstone, produced by No-Name Games and published by Sony (under the Psygnosis label) in 1998, for Microsoft Windows and PlayStation. It is the sequel to The Sentinel by Geoff Crammond and features 651 levels, a multiplayer mode and a soundtrack (titled "Earth/Air") composed by John Carpenter and arranged by Gary McKill.

The PC version has native support limited to a software display mode and an accelerated Glide mode, because in 1998, 3DFX cards were the de facto standard for gaming 3D graphics. However, modern computers can run the game in accelerated mode with the wrappers nGlide, dgVoodoo, OpenGlide or zeckensack's Glide wrapper, which translate Glide calls respectively into Direct3D or OpenGL calls.

This game looks very different from its predecessor. While in The Sentinel the levels were bright and colorful, in Sentinel Returns they are dark and gloomy, with flashes of light being emitted when an object is created or absorbed, and the mouse pointer dynamically lighting the world. The game has a general "hallucinated" look: the skies are made out of contrasting streaks of color; the trees are white; the boulders pulsate as if breathing; the sentinels and sentries are hybrids of flesh and metal; the sentinel stands are covered with skin and have four vertebral columns protruding from the corners; the "specimen" representing the living part of the synthoid resembles a hydatidiform mole, and it squirms and lets out a shriek when injected with a needle.

== Gameplay ==
Controlling Synthoids that are standing at a higher level is fundamental to the game, because only the objects which occupy a visible square can be interacted with (the player character may absorb or create objects on a boulder if the sides can be seen). While doing so, the player must watch for the rotation of the Sentinel and be careful not to stand in an area which the Sentinel can see, or else it will start absorbing energy from the Synthoid, and when the energy is gone, the game is over.

Height is gained by placing a boulder on any visible square, and putting a Synthoid on the boulder. The player may then transfer consciousness to the new Synthoid, and absorb the old one. Stacks of boulders of any height may be created, if the player has enough energy. In order to absorb the Sentinel, the player must create a stack of boulders of sufficient height that the Synthoid on top can look down on the Sentinel's platform. A level is won by absorbing the Sentinel off its platform, creating a new Synthoid in the place of the Sentinel, transferring the consciousness to it and hyperspacing to a new level. Absorbing less than 50% of the total energy present in a level skips a level; absorbing between 50% and 69% skips two levels; absorbing between 70% and 89% skips three levels; absorbing between 90% and 100% skips four levels.

Once the Sentinel is absorbed, the player may no longer absorb any energy from the landscape, although objects may be created as normal. This enables particularly troublesome levels to be skipped, by returning to a previous level, and finishing it with a different amount of energy than before.

In later levels, the Sentinel is assisted by a number of Sentries. They behave exactly like the Sentinel, but absorbing them is not necessary to complete the level. Unlike the Sentinel, the Sentries do not stand on a platform but on ordinary squares. The rotation of the Sentinel and the Sentries is slow and predictable. However, if there are many Sentries, there will be few safe locations anywhere on the landscape. If either the Sentinel or the Sentries see a square with more than 1 unit of energy (boulders or a synthoid), their rotation stops while they absorb the energy, one unit at a time. They must be able to see the square on which the energy is located for absorption to take place. To keep the total energy of the landscape constant, a tree is created randomly on the landscape for each absorbed unit of energy. Thus, in general terms, absorption is simply the transplanting of energy to another location on the game field.

If the Sentinel or Sentry can see a Synthoid or a boulder, but not the square it is standing on, and there are trees in the vicinity, it will transform one of them into a Meanie, which will start rotating. If the player is in a Synthoid when the Meanie turns to face them, and the Meanie can see the square the Synthoid is standing on, it will force the Synthoid to hyperspace and lose 3 units of energy. If the Meanie cannot see the player's square after a full rotation, it will turn back into a tree and the Sentinel or Sentry will resume rotation.

If the player chooses, they may perform a Hyperspace. This uses 3 units of energy to create a new Synthoid at a random location on the playfield. This location is at the same height or lower than the player's current height. While performing a hyperspace can allow the player character to escape the gaze of the Sentinel and/or Sentries, it may take the player into a deep, potentially inescapable ravine. Hyperspacing without the required 3 units of energy (either by player invocation or Meanie) results in the player losing.

Unlike in The Sentinel, rotating the synthoid and transferring the consciousness from a synthoid to another take place in real time.

A networked multiplayer mode is present in the PC version. The goal of multiplayer mode is to race each other to the Sentinel; every player can teleport each other's synthoid to lower levels. The supported DirectPlay service providers are IPX, TCP/IP, modem and serial.

The game has two endings. To see the first one, the player must beat the 651st level. To see the second one, the player must beat every level.

== Development ==
The project was initiated by John Cooke, a fan of the original The Sentinel (he boasted that he is "probably the only person in the world to have finished the original game twice."). Cooke's Company, No Name Games, held the rights to any spin-offs related to The Sentinel, and negotiated for developer Hookstone to create the game for publisher Psygnosis.

The developers made a conscious decision not to stray too far from the highly regarded original game, instead focusing on refining the difficulty slope. At one point they planned for there to be 666 levels, and to not include the level-skipping mechanic from the original game.

The game's musical score was composed by John Carpenter.

The creator of The Sentinel, Geoff Crammond, was not involved with Sentinel Returns.

== Reception ==
Reception

Aggregate score
| Aggregator | Score | |
| Aggregator | PC | PS |
|---|---|---|
| GameRankings | 86% | 63% |

Review scores
| Publication | Score | |
| Publication | PC | PS |
|---|---|---|
| AllGame | 4/5 | 3/5 |
| CNET Gamecenter | 2/10 | N/A |
| Computer Games Strategy Plus | 3.5/5 | N/A |
| Computer Gaming World | 4/5 | N/A |
| Computer and Video Games | 3/5 | N/A |
| Edge | 7/10 | 7/10 |
| Electronic Gaming Monthly | N/A | 6/10 |
| GamePro | 2/5 (Note: GamePro gave the PC version two 2.5/5 scores for graphics and control, 3.5/5 for sound, and 2/5 for overall fun factor.) | 1/5 (Note: GamePro gave the PlayStation version 0.5/5 for graphics, 4/5 for sound, 2/5 for control, and 1/5 for overall fun factor.) |
| GameSpot | 8.1/10 | 7.7/10 |
| Next Generation | N/A | 2/5 |
| Official U.S. PlayStation Magazine | N/A | 2/5 |
| PC Gamer (US) | 76% | N/A |

The PC version received favorable reviews, while the PlayStation version received mixed reviews, according to the review aggregation website GameRankings. Next Generation said of the latter version in an early review, "Those who have fond memories of the original or who crave a new PlayStation experience should rent before buying. It's definitely an acquired taste." Official U.S. PlayStation Magazine gave the same console version a negative review, about two months before it was released Stateside.

The game was nominated for GameSpot's 1998 "Puzzles and Classics Game of the Year" award, which went to You Don't Know Jack: The Ride.
