= Campaign II =

1993 wargame video game

- Developer: Empire Interactive
- Publisher: Empire Interactive
- Platforms: MS-DOS, Amiga
- Release: 1993
- Genres: Wargame, Vehicle simulation
- Mode: Single-player

Campaign II is an action strategy 3D wargame released by Empire Interactive in 1993. It is the sequel to Campaign.

== Plot ==
The game is similar to its predecessor but features campaigns from the postwar era, including Korea, Six-Day War, Yom Kippur War, Vietnam, Iran–Iraq and the Gulf.

== Gameplay ==
The player takes command of an armoured force in a military campaign. There are elements of both strategic and arcade play involved—when hostile units approach each other, the game switches to combat mode and the player is given command of an armoured vehicle in the resulting battle.

== Reception ==
Computer Gaming World in March 1994 criticized Campaign II's "sorry" documentation, inaccurate historical scenarios (the Korean War scenario includes the Pusan Perimeter but not the Battle of Inchon, for example) and tactics, and "marginal" graphics. The magazine concluded that Campaign II failed at being a simulation or an arcade game.
