= Grand Prix Manager =

1995 video game

- Developer(s): MicroProse
- Publisher(s): MicroProse
- Platform(s): PC
- Release: NA: 1995

Grand Prix Manager (GPM) is a Formula 1 management game released in December 1995 by MicroProse. It featured the 1995 Formula 1 season.

== Description ==
The goal of this game is to manage a successful Formula 1 Grand Prix racing team and eventually win the in-game racing championship.

== Reception ==
GameSpot rated the game 6.4 (fair). A Next Generation critic, while acknowledging that the game succeeds at its goal of being a comprehensive and accurate simulation of being a Formula One team manager, argued that the experience is not fun: "People work day in and day out accomplishing the tasks this game sets before you, but they get paid to deal with cranky vendors, snotty drivers, and touchy mechanics. Why shell out $50 for the same experience?" He scored it 2 out of 5 stars.

The sequel to this title is Grand Prix Manager 2, which depicts the 1996 Formula 1 season.
