= Grand Prix Manager 2 =

1996 video game

- European Hasbro Interactive re-release cover art
- Developer: Edward Grabowski Communications Ltd
- Publisher: MicroProse
- Platforms: PC (Windows 3.1, Windows 95, onwards)
- Release: 1996 (UK)
- Genre: Sports management game
- Modes: Single-player, multiplayer

Grand Prix Manager 2 (often shortened as GPM2) is a 1996 Formula 1 management simulation for Windows systems and is based on its predecessor, Grand Prix Manager. It was developed by Edward Grabowski Communications Ltd and published by MicroProse, and is licensed by FIA to have real statistics for the 1996 Formula One season. A sequel, Grand Prix World, was released in 2000.

== Gameplay ==
The management menu

The game is composed of long and short term "contracts", long term games being made up of 10 seasons of F1 (in game from 1996–2005) whilst short term challenges dictated a specific outcome to be met over 1, 2 or 3 seasons. Failure of these results in being fired and losing the game. In long term challenges, the only way to lose the game is if the player's team goes bankrupt. The game can be played on the same computer with one to four players in a hotseat mode, assigning turns for the players to make their decisions. Before the start of a long term scenario, the player(s) may freely edit the teams and personnel to their liking by using a simple in-game editor. Short term scenarios cannot be modified.

During the game the player(s) must hire and dismiss personnel, negotiate with sponsors to secure the team's finances, control the research of new parts to stay competitive, negotiate contracts with engine, fuel, and spare parts suppliers, control testing and set up the car according to hints given by the drivers.

The race screen

Before a race weekend the player(s) can choose whether to see the racing sessions or skip them, thus allowing the game to simulate the results. The car setup can also be altered during these sessions. Before the race the fuel and tyre strategy of both cars has to be set; the game gives a suggestion to the player(s) which can be freely modified. Stirling Moss provides commentary during the race. After the race, news stories based on the race's results and current game events are displayed.

Jacques Villeneuve (a new driver for the real 1996 season) is not named or photographed in the original version of the game. He is instead replaced by 'John Newhouse', an English translation of the Canadian's name, having the correct statistics but a different picture. This was due to Villeneuve owning the copyright to his name and likeness at the time, unlike other drivers whose image rights were signed over to FOCA. This occurred under various guises in all of the Formula One games released from 1996 until 1999, when the issue was finally settled, but it is possible for the player to work around this, as the game allows driver names to be changed before the start of a game. Taki Inoue, a driver scheduled to drive for Minardi in actual 1996 season but replaced by Giancarlo Fisichella at the last minute due to sponsorship reasons, makes an appearance as a driver the player can hire; all other drivers the player can hire are original characters.

== Network play ==
Network play was also introduced in this version of the game, via Serial Connection, Modem, or TCP/IP, expanding the playability of the game. It is still possible to play the game on-line via a software such as Hamachi. Originally it could not support any mods, but recent discoveries have allowed the use of modifications in network games as well.

== Game community ==
This game still has an active community built around it, providing updates of seasons past and present using both the internal and third party editing tools. Several mods have been released.

=== Season updates ===
The first full modification for the game was released in 2004 and based on the same year's Formula One season. Ever since then a modification has been released each year for the contemporary season. There are also many historical mods, based on seasons before and after the game's original season (1996).

== Reception ==
The game received mixed reviews at the time of its release, with some praising the relatively low learning curve and simplicity, while others criticised its relatively poor interface, high difficulty, poor driver simulation, poor financial simulation and lack of overall improvements over the original Grand Prix Manager. Despite this, the game remains popular among F1 management game fans.
