= Grand Prix World =

1999 racing management video game by MicroProse

- The logo of the game
- Developer: MicroProse Chipping Sodbury Studio
- Publisher: Hasbro Interactive
- Platform: Microsoft Windows
- Release: WW: 1999
- Genre: Racing management
- Mode: Single-player

Grand Prix World is the official racing management simulation game of the 1998 Formula One World Championship developed by MicroProse's UK studio and published by Hasbro Interactive for Microsoft Windows in 1999. It is the sequel to Grand Prix Manager 2 and is officially licensed by Formula One Group, holding an official license of Formula One's 1998 season.

Due to its in-depth realistic gameplay and representation of a Formula One team management, it is often referred as the best racing management simulation game ever released.

== Gameplay ==
The player takes control of one of the 11 F1 teams participating in the 1998 Formula One season. Team names or details could not be changed within the game itself. This was only able to be done using a 3rd party editor.

Grand Prix World is different from the preceding games. Although they largely share the same code base, the major changes are the interface design and negotiation modules with sponsors, drivers, and engineers. This results in fewer 'freak' results such as player being able to sign top-line drivers for the bottom-ranking teams, or being able to score points with said teams without major reorganisation of the team.

== Windows 2000, XP, Vista compatibility issues ==
The game was not compatible with Windows 2000, the use of "Windows 98 Compatibility Mode" being required to make the game work in these later operating systems. ALT and TAB functionality is also not available, resulting in a crash of the game.

== Game community and updates ==
One official patch was released by the games designers and is available from their website. This game still has an active community built around it with season updates being produced.
