= Campaign (video game) =

1992 strategy video game

- Developer(s): Empire Interactive
- Publisher(s): Empire Interactive
- Platform(s): Amiga, Atari ST, MS-DOS
- Release: 1992, 1993
- Genre(s): Strategy
- Mode(s): Single player

Campaign is a strategy war game developed and published by Empire Interactive. It was released in 1992 for MS-DOS and in 1993 for the Amiga and Atari ST.

The game is set in World War II. The player may play out scenarios like the Battle of the Bulge and D-Day. Apart from the strategic map, a battle mode will be opened if two hostile forces venture too near each other.

The military units are rendered well in this game, and it includes a 170-page-long equipment manual which also serves as the game's copy protection. It also includes a map editor to create scenarios or modify parts of the game.

It was followed by a sequel, Campaign II.

== Reception ==
Computer Gaming World said of Campaign, "the finished product leaves much to be desired". Criticisms included the difficulty of organizing concentrated attacks, the unrealistically high frequency of night combat, the inability to retreat, and the absence of a way to exit the game or even use Ctrl-Alt-Delete. A 1993 survey in the magazine of wargames gave the game two-plus stars out of five, stating that "it is adequate on the [strategic] level and almost an arcade rendition of the [tactical]".
