= F1 Racing Simulation =

1997 video game

- Developer: Ubi Studios
- Publisher: Ubi Soft
- Platform: Microsoft Windows
- Release: EU: 1997; NA: March 18, 1998
- Genres: Sport, sim racing
- Modes: Single-player, multiplayer

F1 Racing Simulation is a racing simulation game, developed for Microsoft Windows by Ubi Soft in 1997. The game is based on the 1996 Formula One World Championship, and is the first of the Racing Simulation games made by Ubisoft, being the predecessor to Racing Simulation 2, which was released in 1998.

== Development ==
The game was showcased at E3 1997.

== Reception ==
Reception

Aggregate score
Aggregator	Score
GameRankings	88%

Review scores
Publication	Score
CNET Gamecenter	9/10
Computer Games Strategy Plus	5/5
Computer Gaming World	5/5
Edge	7/10
Game Informer	6.5/10
GameRevolution	A−
GameSpot	9/10
Next Generation	4/5
PC Gamer (US)	90%
PC Zone	93%

The game received "favorable" reviews, two points shy of universal acclaim, according to the review aggregation website GameRankings. Computer Games Strategy Plus gave it universal acclaim, over a month before the game was released Stateside. GameSpot wrote that F1 Racing Simulation is an extremely well made simulation racing game. Next Generation noted that the game only had the license for 1996 season, drivers and tracks in comparison to Formula 1 Championship Edition, but praised the graphics and gameplay elements.

The game was a finalist for Computer Gaming World's 1998 "Best Driving" award, and for GameSpot's 1998 "Driving Game of the Year" award, both of which ultimately went to Need for Speed III: Hot Pursuit. PC Gamer US likewise nominated the game as the best racing game of 1998, although it lost to Motocross Madness. The game was also nominated for Best Racing Game at the 1998 CNET Gamecenter Awards, which went to Grand Prix Legends.

The game received a "Gold" award from the Verband der Unterhaltungssoftware Deutschland (VUD) in August 1998, for sales of at least 100,000 units across Germany, Austria and Switzerland. The game was a commercial failure in the U.S., with sales of 12,570 units by April 1999. Discussing this performance, Ubisoft's Tammy Schachter argued that "the install base of 3D cards was not in place for mass-market sales" when the game launched. She also cited the relative unpopularity of the Formula 1 sport in the U.S.

== See also ==
- F1 Pole Position 64, a game for the Nintendo 64 by Ubisoft, also based on the 1996 Formula One season
