= Grand Prix 4 =

2002 video game

- Developer: Simergy (Note: Additional work by Infogrames Chippenham)
- Publisher: Infogrames
- Designer: Geoff Crammond
- Composer: James Hannigan
- Series: Grand Prix
- Platform: Windows
- Release: EU: June 14, 2002; AU: June 21, 2002; NA: September 10, 2002
- Genre: Racing simulation
- Modes: Single-player, multiplayer

Grand Prix 4, commonly known as GP4, is a Formula One racing simulator game developed by Geoff Crammond's development studio Simergy with support from Infogrames' Chippenham development studio, and published by Infogrames. Released for the PC on June 21, 2002, it is the last entry in Crammond's Grand Prix series, and the last entry released under the MicroProse label. Based on the 2001 Formula One season, GP4 is a graphical and physics update from the previous version, Grand Prix 3, which was released in 2000. A modern rerelease on Steam, titled Geoff Crammond Racing 4, is planned for 2026.

== Modifications from version 3 ==
Grand Prix 4 featured a heavily revised graphics engine and updated physics, including wet weather driving:

- While it is possible to play the game on a LAN, multiplayer internet gameplay was not possible, due to licensing restrictions. Some individuals managed to circumvent this limitation later using the Free Tunngle Network.
- The locked framerate and CPU-heavy graphics were still a big issue with the series despite a completely revised graphics engine. However, the graphics engine proved to be very scalable, supporting models and textures multiple times the detail of the original shipped materials.
- The mod community faced similar frustrations with the track format and it took fully two years before the track format was truly "cracked". The first add-on tracks to be released for the game included Shanghai, Istanbul and Jerez.
- When the game was initially launched, it had a large number of bugs. Many of these were addressed by a patch which was later included with the retail game, though the project was canned when Microprose closed and no further official fixes were forthcoming. To compensate for this, some third party programmers addressed some of the remaining problems, and included enhancements which allowed the game to follow the updated rules of the Formula One championship.

== Release ==
Although the game could be considered a relatively modest commercial success, the chances of a further entry to the series could be considered slim to none because MicroProse's parent company Infogrames dissolved the developer shortly after the game's release. In addition, the Sony Computer Entertainment brand's exclusive licensing deal for Formula One games rules out an update with official stats. An Xbox port of the title was planned for release in late 2002, before being cancelled in October that same year.

Much like its predecessors, Grand Prix 4 continues to garner a strong modding community long after its launch, with numerous non-Formula One racing series, such as Champ Car and the IMSA SportsCar Championship, and Formula One seasons, including the recent 2026 season, being represented in the game by dedicated modders.

In December 2025, the current incarnation of MicroProse acquired the rights to the Grand Prix franchise. It announced plans to rerelease all four games, including Grand Prix 4, on Steam with original developer Geoff Crammond. Due to the Formula One license being held by Electronic Arts, the game will be rebranded as Geoff Crammond Racing 4 and include fictional sponsors and names, though Steam Workshop support will be included upon launch.

The first Dev Log detailing what MicroProse was working on for the remastered versions was published in September 2026, revealing that Geoff Crammond Racing 4 would be upgraded to the DirectX 11 runtime. It was also stated that certain rendering processes would be changed, implying that the developers are able to change the source code, which is a hurdle to community-created game mods in the original. MicroProse stated that "we want the games to remain as open and easiy to modify as possible. We know how important modding is to Grand Prix community, and we want to make sure you have room to play with the game files, change things, restore some things back, invent new things, and generally do what racing sim fans have always done best."

== Reception ==
Reception

Aggregate score
Aggregator	Score
Metacritic	77/100

Review scores
Publication	Score
Computer Games Magazine	3/5
Computer Gaming World	4.5/5
Eurogamer	10/10
GameSpot	8/10
GameSpy	4.5/5
GameZone	8.5/10
IGN	8.3/10
Jeuxvideo.com	15/20
PC Gamer (US)	73%
PC Zone	86%

Grand Prix 4 received "generally favorable reviews" according to the review aggregation website Metacritic.

The game won the award in the Sports category at the British Academy of Film and Television Arts Awards in 2002. It was also nominated for Computer Gaming World's 2002 "Sports Game of the Year" award, which ultimately went to Madden NFL 2003. The editors called Grand Prix 4 "one of the better racing games in years past". It was also a runner-up for GameSpot's annual "Best Driving Game on PC" award, losing to Rally Trophy.
