= Grand Prix 3 =

2000 video game

- Developer: MicroProse Chipping Sodbury Studio (Note: Simergy developed by Season 2000 expansion pack.)
- Publisher: Hasbro Interactive (Note: Infogrames published the Season 2000 expansion pack.)
- Designer: Geoff Crammond
- Platform: Windows
- Release: EU/AU: July 28, 2000; NA: August 22, 2000
- Genre: Racing simulation
- Modes: Single-player, multiplayer

Grand Prix 3 is a computer racing simulator developed by MicroProse's UK development studio in Chipping Sodbury and published by Hasbro Interactive, released in July 2000. The expansion pack, "2000 Season", was developed by Simergy and published by Infogrames.

== Gameplay ==
The game is known for featuring the 1998 Formula One season (with all drivers except Jacques Villeneuve, who is instead replaced by a fictional character, John Newhouse). In August 2001 an expansion pack, Grand Prix 3 2000 Season, was released, updating the game to feature the 2000 season's cars and drivers (including Villeneuve), as well as the 2 new circuits on the calendar, the Sepang International Circuit in Malaysia and the Indianapolis Motor Speedway.

== Release ==
In December 2025, the current incarnation of MicroProse acquired the rights to the Grand Prix franchise. It announced plans to rerelease all four games, including Grand Prix 3, on Steam with original developer Geoff Crammond. Due to the Formula One license being held by Electronic Arts, the game will be rebranded as Geoff Crammond Racing 3 and include fictional sponsors and names. However, Steam Workshop support will be included upon launch.

== Reception ==
=== Critical reviews ===
Reception

Aggregate score
Aggregator	Score
Metacritic	87/100

Review scores
Publication	Score
AllGame	4/5
Computer Games Magazine	4.5/5
Computer Gaming World	4/5
Edge	8/10
Eurogamer	10/10
GameSpot	8.5/10
IGN	9/10
PC Gamer (US)	84%
PC Zone	80%

The game received "generally favorable reviews" according to the review aggregation website Metacritic. It was not quite as well received as its predecessors, but at the time was widely considered to be the best racing simulation available.

The editors of Computer Gaming World nominated Grand Prix 3 as the best racing game of 2000, although it lost to Motocross Madness 2. They described Grand Prix 3 as a "precisely tuned" title.

=== Sales ===
In Europe, Grand Prix 3 sold 300,000 units in one month. Italy made up above 30,000 sales of this number, while Spain accounted for 6,500. Multiplayer.it attributed the relatively low sales in Spain to that country's rampant software piracy problem.

In the German market, Grand Prix 3 sold 40,000 units in its first three days of availability. Debuting at #2 on Media Control's computer game sales chart for July 2000, it rose to first place the following month, before claiming fourth in September. The Verband der Unterhaltungssoftware Deutschland (VUD) presented Grand Prix 3 with a "Gold" award at the end of that month, indicating sales of at least 100,000 units across Germany, Austria and Switzerland. The game proceeded to place seventh, ninth and 18th on Media Control's charts through the end of 2000.

Although Grand Prix 3 passed the 100,000-sale mark in German-speaking countries, Udo Hoffman of PC Player reported that it had fallen below Hasbro Interactive's projections by late 2000, and that the publisher was "more than a little disappointed" in its performance. The company's product manager, Thomas Sewing, blamed this outcome in part on high competition from other titles with the Formula One license. Grand Prix 3 continued to chart on Media Control's top 30 in 2001, placing 19th in January, 23rd in February and 17th in March.

In the United Kingdom, Grand Prix 3 received a "Silver" certificate from the Entertainment and Leisure Software Publishers Association (ELSPA), for at least 100,000 sales in the region.

=== Music ===
The game's intro is set to an instrumental version of the Rob Dougan song "Furious Angels", overlaid with various F1 car noises.
