= List of Atari video games (2001–present) =

This is a list of video games released under the Atari label since 2001, when Infogrames Entertainment SA (now Atari SA) purchased Atari's assets. See also List of Infogrames video games.

== 2000s ==
=== 2001 ===
Game	Released	Developer	Platform	Note
MX Rider	October 26, 2001 (Europe) October 30, 2001 (North America)	Paradigm Entertainment	PlayStation 2	Released by Infogrames under Atari banner.
Splashdown	November 5, 2001 (North America) November 9, 2001 (Europe)	Rainbow Studios	PlayStation 2	Released by Infogrames under Atari banner.
TransWorld Surf	November 15, 2001 (North America) March 14, 2002 (Europe)	Angel Studios	Xbox	Released by Infogrames under Atari banner.

=== 2002 ===
Game	Released	Developer	Platform	Note
Atari Anniversary Edition Redux	March 1, 2002 (Europe)	Digital Eclipse	PlayStation	Released by Infogrames under Atari banner in Europe only.
TransWorld Surf	April 30, 2002 (North America) October 4, 2002 (Europe)	Angel Studios	PlayStation 2	Released by Infogrames under Atari banner.
TD Overdrive: The Brotherhood of Speed	May 27, 2002 (North America) July 5, 2002 (Europe)	Pitbull Syndicate	PlayStation 2, Xbox	Released as Test Drive in North America. Released by Infogrames under Atari banner.
V-Rally 3	June 21, 2002 (Europe) September 30, 2002 (North America)	Velez & Dubail	Game Boy Advance	Released by Infogrames under Atari banner.
V-Rally 3	June 21, 2002 (Europe) October 22, 2002 (North America)	Eden Studios	PlayStation 2	Released by Infogrames under Atari banner.
Stuntman	June 25, 2002 (North America) September 6, 2002 (Europe)	Reflections Interactive	PlayStation 2	Released by Infogrames under Atari banner.
Splashdown	June 25, 2002 (North America) August 30, 2002 (Europe)	Rainbow Studios	Xbox	Released by Infogrames under Atari banner.
The Terminator: Dawn of Fate	September 18, 2002 (North America) October 25, 2002 (Europe)	Paradigm Entertainment	PlayStation 2	Released by Infogrames under Atari banner.
The Terminator: Dawn of Fate	September 18, 2002 (North America) October 25, 2002 (Europe)	Paradigm Entertainment	Xbox	Released by Infogrames under Atari banner.
Superman: Shadow of Apokolips	September 25, 2002 (North America) November 15, 2002 (Europe)	Infogrames Sheffield House	PlayStation 2	Released by Infogrames under Atari banner.
Driver 2 Advance	October 4, 2002 (Europe) October 22, 2002 (North America)	Sennari Interactive	Game Boy Advance	Released by Infogrames under Atari banner.
Godzilla: Destroy All Monsters Melee	October 8, 2002 (North America) November 15, 2002 (Europe) December 12, 2002 (Japan)	Pipeworks Software	GameCube	Released by Infogrames under Atari banner.
Transworld Snowboarding	October 29, 2002 (North America) November 15, 2002 (Europe)	Housemarque	Xbox	Released by Infogrames under Atari banner.
Micro Machines	November 8, 2002 (Europe)	Infogrames Sheffield House	PlayStation 2	Released by Infogrames under Atari banner in Europe only.
Micro Machines	November 8, 2002 (Europe)	Infogrames Sheffield House	Xbox	Released by Infogrames under Atari banner. Released exclusively in Europe.
Godzilla: Domination!	November 12, 2002 (North America) November 15, 2002 (Europe)	WayForward Technologies	Game Boy Advance	Released by Infogrames under Atari banner.
Unreal Championship	November 12, 2002 (North America) November 29, 2002 (Europe)	Epic Games Digital Extremes	Xbox	Released by Infogrames under Atari banner.
Superman: The Man of Steel	November 19, 2002 (North America) December 13, 2002 (Europe)	Circus Freak	Xbox	Released by Infogrames under Atari banner.
Grand Prix Challenge	November 22, 2002 (Europe) March 3, 2003 (North America)	Infogrames Melbourne House	PlayStation 2	Released by Infogrames under Atari banner.

=== 2003 ===
Game	Released	Developer	Platform	Note
Ikaruga	January 16, 2003 (Japan) April 15, 2003 (North America) May 23, 2003 (Europe)	Treasure	GameCube	Released by Infogrames under Atari banner.
Micro Machines	January 17, 2003 (Europe)	Infogrames Sheffield House	GameCube	Released only in Europe. Released by Infogrames under Atari banner.
Battle Engine Aquila	January 19, 2003 (North America) February 28, 2003 (Europe)	Lost Toys	PlayStation 2	Released by Infogrames under Atari banner.
Battle Engine Aquila	January 19, 2003 (North America) February 28, 2003 (Europe)	Lost Toys	Xbox	Released by Infogrames under Atari banner.
Furious Karting	January 24, 2003 (Europe) March 28, 2003 (North America)	Babylon Software	Xbox	Released by Infogrames under Atari banner.
Racing Evoluzione	February 18, 2003 (North America) February 28, 2003 (Europe)	Milestone	Xbox	Released by Infogrames under Atari banner.
TransWorld Surf: Next Wave	March 18, 2003 (North America)	Angel Studios	GameCube	Released only in North America. Released by Infogrames under Atari banner.
Superman: Shadow of Apokolips	March 25, 2003 (North America) May 2, 2003 (Europe)	Infogrames Sheffield House	GameCube	Released by Infogrames under Atari banner.
V-Rally 3	March 25, 2003 (North America) March 28, 2003 (Europe)	Eden Studios	Xbox	Released by Infogrames under Atari banner.
Godzilla: Destroy All Monsters Melee	April 16, 2003 (North America)	Pipeworks Software	Xbox	Released only in North America, although European copies exist. Released by Infogrames under Atari banner.
Ghost Vibration	May 9, 2003 (Europe)	Artoon	PlayStation 2	European publishing rights only. Released by Infogrames under Atari banner.
Enter the Matrix	May 14, 2003 (North America) May 15, 2003 (Europe)	Shiny Entertainment	PlayStation 2	Released by Infogrames under Atari banner.
Enter the Matrix	May 14, 2003 (North America) May 15, 2003 (Europe)	Shiny Entertainment	Xbox	Released by Infogrames under Atari banner.
Enter the Matrix	May 14, 2003 (North America) May 15, 2003 (Europe)	Shiny Entertainment	GameCube	Released by Infogrames under Atari banner.
Enter the Matrix	May 14, 2003 (North America) May 15, 2003 (Europe)	Shiny Entertainment	Microsoft Windows	Released by Infogrames under Atari banner.
V-Rally 3	June 25, 2003 (Europe) July 10, 2003 (Japan)	Eden Studios	GameCube	Only released in Europe and Japan. Released by Infogrames under Atari banner.
Neverwinter Nights: Shadows of Undrentide	June 21, 2003 (North America); July 4, 2003 (Europe)	BioWare / Floodgate Entertainment	Microsoft Windows	Expansion pack to Neverwinter Nights. First release solely under Atari name.
Backyard Basketball 2004	July 15, 2003 (North America)	Humongous Entertainment	Microsoft Windows	Only released in North America
Backyard Football 2004	July 15, 2003 (North America)	Humongous Entertainment	Microsoft Windows	Only released in North America
Dora the Explorer: Animal Adventures	July 15, 2003 (North America); 2004 (Europe)	Stunt Puppy Entertainment; Pronto Games	Microsoft Windows	
Pajama Sam: Life is Rough When You Lose Your Stuff	August 15, 2003 (North America)	Humongous Entertainment	Microsoft Windows	Only Released in North America
Putt-Putt: Pep's Birthday Surprise	August 15, 2003 (North America)	Humongous Entertainment	Microsoft Windows	Only Released in North America
Sinbad: Legend of the Seven Seas	August 15, 2003 (North America); November 2003 (Europe)	Microsoft Windows	Small Rockets	
Beyblade: Let it Rip!	August 22, 2003 (Europe)	Wavedge	PlayStation	European publishing rights only.
Enclave	September 12, 2003 (Europe)	Starbreeze Studios	Microsoft Windows	European publishing rights only.
The Temple of Elemental Evil	September 16, 2003 (North America); October 10, 2003 (Europe)	Microsoft Windows	Troika Games	
Dungeons and Dragons: Heroes	September 17, 2003 (North America); October 31, 2003 (Europe)	Atari Interactive Hunt Valley Studio	Xbox	
Beyblade VForce: Super Tournament Battle	September 23, 2003 (North America); November 28, 2003 (Europe)	A.I.	GameCube	North American and European publishing rights only.
Wheel of Fortune 2003	October 1, 2003 (North America)	Artech Studios	Microsoft Windows	Only released in North America
Tonka Town	October 1, 2003 (North America); February 27, 2004 (Europe)	ImaginEngine	Microsoft Windows	
Backyard Hockey	October 9, 2003 (North America)	Mistic Software	Game Boy Advance	Released exclusively in North America.
Deer Hunter 2004	October 13, 2003 (North America)	Southlogic Studios	Microsoft Windows	Released exclusively in North America.
RollerCoaster Tycoon 2: Time Twister	October 21, 2003 (North America); November 7, 2003	Frontier Developments	Microsoft Windows	Expansion pack to RollerCoaster Tycoon 2
Backyard Basketball	October 21, 2003 (North America); November 19, 2004 (Europe)	Humongous Entertainment	PlayStation 2	Released as Junior Sports Basketball in Europe, without the NBA license and dubbed voices.
Jeopardy!	October 28, 2003 (North America)	Artech Studios	PlayStation 2	Only released in North America.
Gothic II	October 28, 2003 (North America)	Piranha Bytes	Microsoft Windows	North American publishing rights only. Released under Infogrames in Europe under license from JoWooD Productions
Dragon Ball Z: Budokai	October 28, 2003 (North America)	Dimps	GameCube	North American publishing rights only.
Risk: Global Domination	November 4, 2003 (North America); July 9, 2004 (Europe)	Cyberlore Studios	PlayStation 2	
Civilization III: Conquests	November 4, 2003 (North America); November 14, 2003 (Europe)	BreakAway Games	Microsoft Windows	Expansion pack to Civilization III
Unlimited Saga	November 7, 2003 (Europe)	Square	PlayStation 2	European publishing rights only.
Atari: 80 Classic Games in One!	November 11, 2003 (North America); 2004 (Europe)	Digital Eclipse	Microsoft Windows	
Terminator 3: Rise of the Machines	November 11, 2003 (North America); November 28, 2003 (Europe)	Black Ops Entertainment	PlayStation 2, Xbox	
Wheel of Fortune	November 11, 2003 (North America)	Artech Studios	PlayStation 2	
V-Rally 3	November 14, 2003 (Europe)	Eden Games	Microsoft Windows	Released exclusively in Europe.
Kya: Dark Lineage	November 18, 2003 (North America); April 2, 2004 (Europe)	Eden Games	PlayStation 2	
Magic the Gathering: Battlegrounds	November 18, 2003 (North America); November 21, 2003 (Europe)	Secret Level, Inc.	Xbox, Microsoft Windows	
Tonka: Rescue Patrol	November 18, 2003 (North America)	Lucky Chicken Games	GameCube	Licensing only, published by TDK Mediactive. Released only in North America.
Asterix & Obelix XXL	November 21, 2003 (Europe); September 24, 2004 (North America)	Étranges Libellules	PlayStation 2	Released as Asterix & Obelix: Kick Buttix in North America.
Mission: Impossible – Operation Surma	December 2, 2003 (North America); December 5, 2003 (Europe)	Paradigm Entertainment	PlayStation 2, Xbox	
Neverwinter Nights: Hordes of the Underdark	December 2, 2003 (North America); December 5, 2003 (Europe)	BioWare; Atari Santa Monica	Microsoft Windows	Expansion pack to Neverwinter Nights
Terminator 3: War of the Machines	December 2, 2003 (North America); December 5, 2003 (Europe)	Clever's Games	Microsoft Windows	
Dragon Ball Z: Budokai 2	December 5, 2003 (North America)	Dimps	PlayStation 2	North American/Australian publishing rights only.
Deer Hunter	December 22, 2003 (North America)	Coresoft	PlayStation 2	North American publishing rights only.
Tonka Firefighter	Late-2003 (North America); February 27, 2004 (Europe)	Boston Animation	Microsoft Windows	

=== 2004 ===
Game	Released	Developer	Platform	Note
Unreal II: The Awakening	February 10, 2004 (North America); March 23, 2004 (Europe)	Epic Games; Digital Extremes; Tantalus Interactive (Porter)	Xbox	
Dead Man's Hand	March 2, 2004 (North America); April 29, 2004 (Europe)	Human Head Studios	Xbox	
Saturday Night Speedway	March 11, 2004 (North America)	Ratbag Games	PlayStation 2, Microsoft Windows	North American publishing rights only.
Dead Man's Hand	March 16, 2004 (North America); April 2, 2004 (Europe)	Human Head Studios	Microsoft Windows	
Backyard Baseball	March 23, 2004 (North America)	Humongous Entertainment	PlayStation 2	Released only in North America.
Mission: Impossible - Operation Surma	March 23, 2004 (North America); April 2, 2004 (Europe)	Paradigm Entertainment	GameCube	
Trivial Pursuit Unhinged	March 23, 2004 (North America); October 29, 2004 (Europe)	Artech Studios	PlayStation 2, Xbox	Released as Trivial Pursuit Unlimited in Germany. Xbox version only released in North America.
Ballance	April 2, 2004 (Europe); 2004 (North America)	Cyparade	Microsoft Windows	
Trivial Pursuit Unhinged	April 28, 2004 (North America); October 22, 2004 (Europe)	Artech Studios	Microsoft Windows	Released as Trivial Pursuit Unlimited in Germany.
Transformers	May 11, 2004 (North America); May 25, 2004 (Europe)	Atari Melbourne House	PlayStation 2	
Shadow Ops: Red Mercury	June 15, 2004 (North America); June 18, 2004 (Europe)	Zombie Studios	Xbox	
Asterix & Obelix XXL	June 18, 2004 (Europe)	Étranges Libellules	GameCube, Microsoft Windows	Released only in Europe.
Asterix & Obelix XXL	June 18, 2004 (Europe)	Velez & Dubail	Game Boy Advance	Released only in Europe.
Driver 3	June 21, 2004 (North America); June 22, 2004 (Europe)	Reflections Interactive	PlayStation 2, Xbox	
Backyard Baseball 2005	June 22, 2004 (North America)	Humongous Entertainment	Microsoft Windows	Released only in North America.
Dragon Ball GT: Final Bout	August 24, 2004 (North America)	Tose	PlayStation	Released only in North America. Re-release, originally published by Bandai America in 1997
Test Drive: Eve of Destruction	August 24, 2004 (North America); November 26, 2004 (Europe)	Monster Games	PlayStation 2, Xbox	Released as Driven to Destruction in Europe. Xbox version only released in North America.
Zoids: Battle Legends	September 3, 2004 (North America)	Tomy	GameCube	North American publishing rights only.
Terminator 3: The Redemption	September 7, 2004 (North America); September 24, 2004 (Europe)	Paradigm Entertainment	PlayStation 2, Xbox, GameCube	
Chris Sawyer's Locomotion	September 7, 2004 (North America); September 10, 2004 (Europe)	Chris Sawyer	Microsoft Windows	
Forgotten Realms: Demon Stone	September 14, 2004 (North America); September 24, 2004 (Europe)	Stormfront Studios	PlayStation 2	
Yu Yu Hakusho: Dark Tournament	September 21, 2004 (North America); July 15, 2005 (Europe)	Digital Friction	PlayStation 2	
Titeuf: Mega Compet	September 24, 2004 (France)	Eden Games	PlayStation 2, Microsoft Windows	Released only in France.
Hearts of Iron: Platinum	September 21, 2004 (North America)	Paradox Development Studio	Microsoft Windows	Released exclusively in North America.
Shadow Ops: Red Mercury	September 21, 2004 (North America); October 1, 2004 (Europe)	Zombie Studios	Microsoft Windows	
Backyard Hockey 2005	September 21, 2004 (North America)	Humongous Entertainment	Microsoft Windows	Released only in North America.
Backyard Basketball	September 21, 2004 (North America)	Mistic Software	Game Boy Advance	Released only in North America.
Backyard Skateboarding	September 28, 2004 (North America)	Humongous Entertainment	Microsoft Windows	Released only in North America.
Deer Hunter 2005	September 28, 2004 (North America)	Southlogic Studios	Microsoft Windows	Released only in North America.
Scrabble Online	October 4, 2004 (North America)	Boston Animation	Microsoft Windows	Released only in North America.
RollerCoaster Tycoon 3	October 26, 2004 (North America); November 5, 2004 (Europe)	Frontier Developments	Microsoft Windows	
Godzilla: Save the Earth	November 2, 2004 (North America); December 10, 2004 (Europe)	Pipeworks Software	PlayStation 2, Xbox	
Duel Masters	November 2, 2004 (North America); December 3, 2004 (Europe)	High Voltage Software	PlayStation 2	
Axis & Allies	November 2, 2004 (North America); November 12, 2004 (Europe)	TimeGate Studios	Microsoft Windows	
Top Spin	November 12, 2004 (Europe)	PAM Development	Microsoft Windows	Released exclusively in Europe.
Atari Anthology	November 12, 2004 (Europe); November 16, 2004 (North America)	Digital Eclipse	Xbox	
Dragon Ball Z: Budokai 3	November 16, 2004 (North America)	Dimps	PlayStation 2	North American/Australian publishing rights only.
Forgotten Realms: Demon Stone	November 16, 2004 (North America); February 11, 2005 (Europe)	Stormfront Studios	Xbox	
Atari Anthology	November 22, 2004 (North America); February 18, 2005 (Europe)	Digital Eclipse	PlayStation 2	
Sid Meier's Pirates!	November 22, 2004 (North America); December 3, 2004 (Europe)	Fraxis Games	Microsoft Windows	Published until May 2005, 2K took over afterward
Forgotten Realms: Demon Stone	December 9, 2004 (North America); February 11, 2005 (Europe)	Zono	Microsoft Windows	
Dragon Ball Z: Budokai 2	December 15, 2004 (North America)	Dimps	GameCube	North American publishing rights only.

=== 2005 ===
Game	Released	Developer	Platform	Note
Driver 3	March 15, 2005 (North America); March 18, 2005 (Europe)	Reflections Interactive	Microsoft Windows	
Act of War: Direct Action	March 15, 2005 (North America); March 18, 2005 (Europe)	Eugen Systems	Microsoft Windows	
Backyard Baseball 2006	March 15, 2005 (North America)	Game Brains	Game Boy Advance	Released only in North America.
Dragon Ball Z: Sagas	March 22, 2005 (North America)	Avalanche Software	PlayStation 2, Xbox, GameCube	Released only in North America.
Boiling Point: Road to Hell	May 20, 2005 (Europe); June 6, 2005 (North America)	Deep Shadows	Microsoft Windows	Publishing rights outside Ukraine and Russian territories
RollerCoaster Tycoon 3: Soaked!	June 21, 2005 (North America); June 24, 2005 (Europe)	Frontier Developments	Microsoft Windows	Expansion pack for RollerCoaster Tycoon 3
Transformers: Director's Cut	September 2, 2005 (Europe)	Atari Melbourne House	PlayStation 2	Released only in Europe. Re-release of Transformers with extra DVD-based content
Musashi: Samurai Legend	September 9, 2005 (Europe)	Square Enix	PlayStation 2	European release
Fahrenheit	September 16, 2005 (Europe); September 20, 2005 (North America)	Quantic Dream	PlayStation 2, Xbox, Microsoft Windows	Released as Indigo Prophecy in North America.
Backyard Football 2006	September 20, 2005 (North America)	Humongous Entertainment	Microsoft Windows	Released only in North America.
Dora the Explorer: Dance to the Rescue	September 25, 2005 (North America); September 29, 2005 (Europe)	ImaginEngine	Microsoft Windows	
Asterix & Obelix XXL 2: Mission: Las Vegum	September 30, 2005 (France, Germany, other territories); June 30, 2006 (United Kingdom)	Étranges Libellules	PlayStation 2, Microsoft Windows	Released only in Europe.
Dungeons & Dragons: Dragonshard	October 2, 2005 (North America); November 4, 2005 (Europe)	Liquid Entertainment	Microsoft Windows	
Neverwinter Nights: Kingmaker	October 2, 2005 (North America); November 4, 2005 (Europe)	BioWare	Microsoft Windows	Module Pack for Neverwinter Nights
Backyard Football 2006	October 4, 2005 (North America)	Humongous Entertainment	PlayStation 2	Released only in North America.
Backyard Skateboarding	October 4, 2005 (North America)	Humongous Entertainment	Microsoft Windows	Released only in North America.
Backyard Skateboarding	October 4, 2005 (North America)	Full Fat	Game Boy Advance	Released only in North America.
Driver 3	October 14, 2005 (Europe); October 25, 2005 (North America)	Velez & Dubail	Game Boy Advance	
Dragon Ball Z: Budokai Tenkaichi	October 18, 2005 (North America)	Spike	PlayStation 2	North American/Australian publishing rights only.
Backyard Football 2006	October 18, 2005 (North America)	Torus Games	Game Boy Advance	Released only in North America.
RollerCoaster Tycoon 3: Wild!	October 25, 2005 (North America); November 4, 2005 (Europe)	Frontier Developments	Microsoft Windows	Expansion pack for RollerCoaster Tycoon 3
The Matrix: Path of Neo	November 7, 2005 (North America); November 11, 2005 (Europe)	Shiny Entertainment	PlayStation 2, Xbox, Microsoft Windows	

=== 2006 ===
Game	Released	Developer	Platform	Note
Marc Ecko's Getting Up: Contents Under Pressure	February 14, 2006 (North America); February 24, 2006 (Europe)	The Collective	PlayStation 2, Xbox, Microsoft Windows	
Tycoon City: New York	February 21, 2006 (North America); February 24, 2006 (Europe)	Deep Red Games	Microsoft Windows	
Crashday	February 21, 2006 (North America); February 24, 2006 (Europe)	Deep Red Games	Microsoft Windows	European publishing rights only.
Dungeons & Dragons Online: Stormreach	February 28, 2006 (North America); March 3, 2006 (Europe)	Turbine Studios	Microsoft Windows	Physical publishing rights until 2010's
Driver: Parallel Lines	March 14, 2006 (North America); March 17, 2006 (Europe)	Reflections Interactive	PlayStation 2, Xbox	Later versions published by Ubisoft.
Kao the Kangaroo: Round 2	March 21, 2006 (North America)	Tate Interactive	PlayStation 2, Xbox, GameCube, Microsoft Windows	North American publishing rights only.
Act of War: High Treason	March 24, 2006 (Europe); May 30, 2006 (North America)	Eugen Systems	Microsoft Windows	Expansion Pack for Act of War: Direct Action
Desperados 2: Cooper's Revenge	April 28, 2006 (Europe); May 8, 2006 (North America)	Spellbound Entertainment	Microsoft Windows	
Backyard Sports: Baseball 2007	June 12, 2006 (North America)	Game Brains	Game Boy Advance	Released only in North America; Published under license from Humongous, Inc.
Super Dragon Ball Z	July 18, 2006 (North America)	Arika; Crafts & Meister	PlayStation 2	North American/Australian publishing rights only.
Backyard Sports: Baseball 2007	September 5, 2006 (North America)	Game Brains	PlayStation 2	Released only in North America; Published under license from Humongous, Inc.
Test Drive Unlimited	September 5, 2006 (North America); September 8, 2006 (Europe)	Eden Games	Xbox 360	
Backyard Sports: Baseball 2007	September 11, 2006 (North America)	Game Brains	Microsoft Windows	Released only in North America; Published under license from Humongous, Inc.
Backyard Sports: Football 2007	September 26, 2006 (North America)	Torus Games	Game Boy Advance	Released only in North America; Published under license from Humongous, Inc.
Dragon Ball Z: Budokai Tenkaichi 2	November 7, 2006	Spike	PlayStation 2	North American/Australian publishing rights only.
Backyard Sports: NBA Basketball 2007	September 26, 2006 (North America)	Mistic Software	Game Boy Advance	Released only in North America; Published under license from Humongous, Inc.
Neverwinter Nights 2	October 31, 2006 (North America); November 3, 2006 (Europe)	Obsidian Entertainment	Microsoft Windows	
Asterix & Obelix XXL 2: Mission: Wifix	November 17, 2006 (Europe)	Tate Interactive	PlayStation Portable	Released only in Europe.
Asterix & Obelix XXL 2: Mission: Wifix	November 17, 2006 (Europe)	Mistic Software	Nintendo DS	Released only in Europe.
Thrillville	December 1, 2006 (Europe)	Frontier Developments	PlayStation 2	European publishing rights only.

=== 2007 ===
Game	Released	Developer	Platform	Note
Arthur and the Invisibles	January 9, 2007 (North America); February 2, 2007 (Europe)	Étranges Libellules	PlayStation 2, Microsoft Windows	Known as Arthur and the Minimoys in Non-English European regions, and Arthur and the Invisibles: The Game in North America.
Backyard Sports: NBA Basketball 2007	February 13, 2007 (North America)	Game Brains	PlayStation 2	Released only in North America; Published under license from Humongous, Inc.
Pat Sajak's Lucky Letters	January 15, 2007 (North America)	Pat Sajak Games	Microsoft Windows	Released only in North America.
Backyard Sports: NBA Basketball 2007	February 20, 2007 (North America)	Game Brains	Microsoft Windows	Released only in North America; Published under license from Humongous, Inc.
Bullet Witch	February 27, 2007 (North America); March 6, 2007 (Europe)	Cavia	Xbox 360	Non-Japanese publishing rights only.
Test Drive Unlimited	March 16, 2007 (Europe); March 20, 2007 (North America)	Eden Games	Microsoft Windows	
Test Drive Unlimited	March 16, 2007 (Europe); March 20, 2007 (North America)	Atari Melbourne House	PlayStation 2, PlayStation Portable	
Silverfall	March 20, 2007 (North America)	Monte Cristo	Microsoft Windows	North American publishing rights only
Backyard Sports: Baseball 2007	April 3, 2007	Game Brains	GameCube	Released only in North America; Published under license from Humongous, Inc.
Centipede and Millipede	May 2, 2007	Stainless Games	Xbox 360 (Xbox Live Arcade)	
Arma: Combat Operations	May 4, 2007 (North America)	Bohemia Interactive	Microsoft Windows	North American publishing rights only
Missile Command	July 4, 2007	Stainless Games	Xbox 360 (Xbox Live Arcade)	
Backyard Basketball	September 25, 2007 (North America)	Mistic Software	Nintendo DS	Released only in North America; Published under license from Humongous, Inc.
Neverwinter Nights 2: Mask of the Betrayer	September 28, 2007 (Europe); October 9, 2007 (North America)	Obsidian Entertainment	Microsoft Windows	Expansion Pack to Neverwinter Nights 2
Backyard Hockey	October 9, 2007 (North America)	Mistic Software	Nintendo DS	Released only in North America; Published under license from Humongous, Inc.
Backyard Football '08	October 16, 2007 (North America)	FarSight Studios	PlayStation 2, Wii, Microsoft Windows	Released only in North America. Known as simply Backyard Football on the Wii; Published under license from Humongous, Inc.
Backyard Football	October 23, 2007 (North America)	Torus Games	Nintendo DS	Released only in North America. Published under license from Humongous, Inc.
The Witcher	October 26, 2007 (Europe); October 30, 2007 (North America)	CD Projekt Red	Microsoft Windows	Physical publication except in Eastern Europe and Russian territories
Dragon Ball Z: Budokai Tenkaichi 3	November 13, 2007 (North America)	Spike	PlayStation 2	North American/Australian publishing rights only.
Godzilla: Unleashed	November 20, 2007 (North America, PlayStation 2); December 5, 2007 (North America, Wii); February 22, 2008 (Europe)	Pipeworks Software	PlayStation 2, Wii	
Swashbucklers: Blue vs. Grey	November 20, 2007 (North America)	Akella	PlayStation 2	Released only in North America.
Go West! A Lucky Luke Adventure	November 20, 2007 (Europe)	Tate Interactive	Wii, Microsoft Windows	Released only in some European territories.
My Horse & Me	November 23, 2007 (Europe); February 5, 2008 (North America)	Woedend! Games	Wii	
My Horse & Me	November 30, 2007 (Europe); February 19, 2008 (North America)	Woedend! Games	Microsoft Windows	
Asteroids and Asteroids Deluxe	November 28, 2007	Stainless Games	Xbox 360 (Xbox Live Arcade)	
Jenga World Tour	December 7, 2007 (North America); February 22, 2008 (Europe)	Atomic Planet Entertainment	Wii	
Tempest	December 19, 2007	Stainless Games	Xbox 360 (Xbox Live Arcade)	

=== 2008 ===
Game	Released	Developer	Platform	Note
Asterix at the Olympic Games	February 29, 2008 (Europe)	Étranges Libellules	PlayStation 2, Wii, Microsoft Windows	Released only in Europe.
Backyard Baseball '09	March 25, 2008 (North America)	FarSight Studios	PlayStation 2, Wii, Microsoft Windows	Released only in North America. Published under license from Humongous, Inc.
Backyard Baseball '09	March 25, 2008 (North America)	Mistic Software	Nintendo DS	Released only in North America. Published under license from Humongous, Inc.
Efteling Tycoon	March 28, 2008 (Netherlands)	Dartmoor Softworks, HexArts Entertainment	Microsoft Windows	Released only in the Netherlands by Atari Benelux.
Battlezone	April 16, 2008	Stainless Games	Xbox 360 (Xbox Live Arcade)	
Namco Museum Remix	April 18, 2008 (Europe)	Namco Bandai Games	Wii	European publishing rights only.
Warlords	May 28, 2008	Stainless Games	Xbox 360 (Xbox Live Arcade)	
Alone in the Dark	June 20, 2008 (Europe); June 23, 2008 (North America)	Eden Games	Xbox 360, Microsoft Windows	
Alone in the Dark	June 20, 2008 (Europe); June 23, 2008 (North America)	Hydravision Entertainment	PlayStation 2, Wii	
Asterix at the Olympic Games	August 22, 2008 (Europe); Mid-2008 (North America)	Étranges Libellules	Xbox 360	Enhanced port of the original game.
Deer Hunter Tournament	October 14, 2008 (North America)	Southlogic Studios	Microsoft Windows	Released only in North America.
Backyard Football '09	October 21, 2008 (North America)	FarSight Studios	PlayStation 2, Wii, Microsoft Windows	Released only in North America. Published under license from Humongous, Inc.
Backyard Football '09	October 21, 2008 (North America)	Torus Games	Nintendo DS	Released only in North America. Published under license from Humongous, Inc.
Legendary	October 24, 2008 (Europe, Xbox 360); November 7, 2008 (Europe, PlayStation 3); November 21, 2008 (Europe, Microsoft Windows)	Spark Unlimited	Xbox 360, PlayStation 3, Microsoft Windows	European publishing rights only.
My Horse and Me 2	October 31, 2008 (Europe, Xbox 360); November 14, 2008 (Europe, PlayStation 2 and Windows); April 30, 2009 (North America)	Tate Interactive	Xbox 360, Wii, PlayStation 2, Microsoft Windows	Xbox 360, PlayStation 2 and Windows versions released only in Europe.
Dragon Ball Z: Infinite World	November 4, 2008 (North America)	Dimps	PlayStation 2	North American/Australian publishing rights only.
Alone in the Dark: Inferno	November 14, 2008 (Europe); November 18, 2008 (North America)	Eden Games	PlayStation 3	Enhanced port of Alone in the Dark
Neverwinter Nights 2: Storm of Zehir	November 18, 2008 (North America); November 21, 2008 (Europe)	Obsidian Entertainment	Microsoft Windows	Expansion Pack to Neverwinter Nights 2
The Tale of Despereaux	December 2, 2008 (North America)	PlayStation 2, Wii, Microsoft Windows	Sensory Sweep Studios	North American publishing rights only, taken over from Brash Entertainment
Freddi Fish: The Case of the Missing Kelp Seeds	December 5, 2008 (Europe)	Mistic Software	Wii	European publishing rights only. Published under license from Humongous, Inc.
Spy Fox: Dry Cereal	December 5, 2008 (Europe)	Mistic Software	Wii	European publishing rights only. Published under license from Humongous, Inc.
Pajama Sam: No Need to Hide When It's Dark Outside	December 5, 2008 (Europe)	Mistic Software	Wii	European publishing rights only. Published under license from Humongous, Inc.

=== 2009 ===
Game	Released	Developer	Platform	Note
Race Pro	February 17, 2009 (North America); February 20, 2009 (Europe)	SimBin Studios	Xbox 360	
Ready 2 Rumble: Revolution	March 17, 2009 (North America); March 20, 2009 (Europe)	AKI Corporation USA	Wii	
Backyard Baseball '10	March 27, 2009 (North America)	FarSight Studios	PlayStation 2, Wii	Released only in North America. Published under license from Humongous, Inc.
Backyard Baseball '10	March 27, 2009 (North America)	Mistic Software	Nintendo DS	Released only in North America. Published under license from Humongous, Inc.
The Chronicles of Riddick: Assault on Dark Athena	April 7, 2009 (North America); April 24, 2009 (Europe)	Starbreeze Studios	Xbox 360, PlayStation 3, Microsoft Windows	
Neverwinter Nights 2: Mysteries of Westgate	April 29, 2009	Ossian Studios	Microsoft Windows	Adventure Pack to Neverwinter Nights 2 Digital only
Ghostbusters: The Video Game	June 16, 2009 (North America); November 6, 2009 (North America)	Terminal Reality	Xbox 360, PlayStation 3, Microsoft Windows	PlayStation 3 version was published by SCEE in Europe, and released in June.
Ghostbusters: The Video Game	June 16, 2009 (North America); November 6, 2009 (Europe)	Red Fly Studio	PlayStation 2, Wii	PlayStation 2 version were published by SCEE in Europe, and released in June.
Champions Online	September 1, 2009 (North America); September 10, 2009 (Europe)	Cryptic Studios	Microsoft Windows	Published until May 2011
Qubed	September 15, 2009 (North America)	Q Entertainment	Xbox 360	Released only in North America. Physical release of four Xbox Live Arcade titles
Backyard Football '10	October 20, 2009 (North America)	FarSight Studios	PlayStation 2, Xbox 360, Wii	Released only in North America. Published under license from Humongous, Inc.
Ghostbusters: The Video Game	October 30, 2009 (North America)	Red Fly Studio	PlayStation Portable	Published by SCEE in Europe.

== 2010s ==
=== 2010 ===
Game	Released	Developer	Platform	Note
Star Trek Online	February 2, 2010 (North America); February 5, 2010 (Europe)	Cryptic Studios	Microsoft Windows	Published until May 2011
Project Runway	March 2, 2010 (North America, Wii); March 9, 2010 (North America, Windows); June 18, 2010 (Europe)	Tornado Studios	Wii, Microsoft Windows	Windows version released only in North America.
Sam & Max Beyond Time and Space	March 16, 2010 (North America); September 30, 2010 (Europe)	Telltale Games	Microsoft Windows, Wii	Physical releases only.
Backyard Sports: Sandlot Sluggers	May 25, 2010 (North America)	HB Studios	Xbox 360, Wii	Released only in North America. Published under license from Humongous, Inc.
Backyard Sports: Sandlot Sluggers	May 25, 2010 (North America)	Powerhead Games	Nintendo DS	Released only in North America. Published under license from Humongous, Inc.
Blade Kitten	September 22, 2010	Krome Studios	PlayStation 3 (PlayStation Network), Xbox 360 (Xbox Live Arcade)	
Backyard Sports: Rookie Rush	October 20, 2010 (North America)	HB Studios	Xbox 360, Wii	Released only in North America. Published under license from Humongous, Inc.
Backyard Sports: Rookie Rush	October 20, 2010 (North America)	Powerhead Games	Nintendo DS	Released only in North America. Published under license from Humongous, Inc.
Haunted House	September 29, 2010 (Microsoft Windows); October 5, 2010 (Wii, North America); October 28, 2010 (Xbox Live Arcade); February 25, 2011 (Wii, Europe)	ImaginEngine	Microsoft Windows, Xbox 360 (Xbox Live Arcade)	Wii version was released physically. The Windows and Xbox 360 versions are download-only releases.
Atari Greatest Hits - Volume 1	November 2, 2010 (North America); February 24, 2011 (Europe)	Code Mystics	Nintendo DS	
The UnderGarden	November 10, 2010 (Xbox 360 and Windows); February 1, 2011 (PlayStation 3)	Artech Studios; Vitamin G Studios	Microsoft Windows, Xbox 360 (Xbox Live Arcade), PlayStation 3 (PlayStation Network)	

=== 2011 ===
Game	Released	Developer	Platform	Note
Test Drive Unlimited 2	February 8, 2011 (North America); February 11, 2011 (Europe)	Eden Games	Xbox 360, PlayStation 3, Microsoft Windows	
Atari Greatest Hits - Volume 2	March 8, 2011 (North America)	Code Mystics	Nintendo DS	Released only in North America
Ghostbusters: Sanctum of Slime	March 23, 2011	Behaviour Santiago	Xbox 360 (Xbox Live Arcade), PlayStation 3 (PlayStation Network), Microsoft Windows	
Yars' Revenge	April 13, 2011 (Xbox 360); April 28, 2011 (Windows)	Killspace Entertainment	Xbox 360 (Xbox Live Arcade), Microsoft Windows	
Star Raiders	May 11, 2011 (Windows and Xbox 360); June 1, 2011 (PlayStation 3, North America); June 29, 2011 (PlayStation 3, Europe)	Incinerator Studios	Microsoft Windows, Xbox 360 (Xbox Live Arcade), PlayStation 3 (PlayStation Network)	
Dungeons & Dragons: Daggerdale	May 25, 2011 (Windows and Xbox 360); May 22, 2012 (PlayStation 3, North America); July 11, 2012 (PlayStation 3, Europe)	Bedlam Games	Microsoft Windows, Xbox 360 (Xbox Live Arcade), PlayStation 3 (PlayStation Network)	A physical Windows version was released in North America and some European territories.
The Kore Gang	November 8, 2011 (North America)	Zoink; SnapDragon Games; Unique Development Studios	Wii	North American publishing rights
Centipede: Infestation	November 18, 2011 (North America)	WayForward Technologies	Wii, Nintendo 3DS	Released only in North America

=== 2012 ===
Game	Released	Developer	Platform	Note
Test Drive: Ferrari Racing Legends	July 3, 2012 (North America); July 6, 2012 (Europe)	Slightly Mad Studios	Xbox 360	Published under license by Rombax Games
Warlords	October 9, 2012 (PlayStation 3); November 14, 2012 (Xbox 360)	Griptonite Games	Xbox 360 (Xbox Live Arcade)	
RollerCoaster Tycoon 3D	October 16, 2012 (North America); October 26, 2012 (Europe)	n-Space	Nintendo 3DS	
Pong World	November 29, 2012	zGames	iOS, Android	Reimagining of Pong

=== 2013 ===
Game	Released	Developer	Platform	Note
Special Forces: Team X	February 6, 2013	Zombie Studios	Xbox 360 (Xbox Live Arcade), Microsoft Windows	

=== 2014 ===
Game	Released	Developer	Platform	Note
RollerCoaster Tycoon 4 Mobile	April 10, 2014 (iOS); October 22, 2014 (Android)	On5, UAB	iOS, Android	Servers shut down in 2020
911 First Responders	September 25, 2014	Sixteen Tons Entertainment	Microsoft Windows	Delisted in 2018/2019
Haunted House: Cryptic Graves	November 25, 2014	Dreampainters Software	Microsoft Windows	Reimagining of Haunted House, eventually delisted

=== 2015 ===
Game	Released	Developer	Platform	Note
Atari Scratchers	January 5, 2015	unknown	iOS, Android	Virtual scratch cards based on Atari arcade games.
Asteroids: Outpost	March 26, 2015	Salty Games	Microsoft Windows	Online shooter based on Asteroids. Was never fully released and delisted in October 2016
Alone in the Dark: Illumination	June 11, 2015	Pure FPS	Microsoft Windows	Publishing rights now owned by THQ Nordic following purchase of the franchise in September 2018

=== 2016 ===
Game	Released	Developer	Platform	Note
Pridefest	January 27, 2016	Vertigo Arts	iOS, Android	
Atari Vault	March 24, 2016 (Windows); May 26, 2016 (Linux)	Code Mystics	Microsoft Windows, Linux	Delisted in 2022 following release of Atari 50
RollerCoaster Tycoon World	November 16, 2016	Nvizzio Creations	Microsoft Windows, MacOS, Linux	Entry in the RollerCoaster Tycoon series
RollerCoaster Tycoon Classic	December 22, 2016	Origin8 Technologies	iOS, Android	Mobile port of RollerCoaster Tycoon and RollerCoaster Tycoon 2

=== 2017 ===
Game	Released	Developer	Platform	Note
RollerCoaster Tycoon Touch	22 February 2017	Nvizzio Creations	iOS, Android	Based on RollerCoaster Tycoon World
Atari Vault	March 16, 2017	Code Mystics	MacOS	Delisted in 2022 following release of Atari 50
RollerCoaster Tycoon Classic	September 28, 2017	Origin8 Technologies	Microsoft Windows	Computer version of the iOS title

=== 2018 ===
Game	Released	Developer	Platform	Note
Tempest 4000	July 17, 2018	Llamasoft	Microsoft Windows, PlayStation 4, Xbox One	Sequel in the Tempest series
RollerCoaster Tycoon Joyride	Ootober 23, 2018 (Europe); December 13, 2018 (North America)	Nvizzio Creations	PlayStation 4	Rail Shooter based on RollerCoaster Tycoon series, also contains VR mode
RollerCoaster Tycoon Adventures	December 6, 2018 (Europe); December 13, 2018 (North America)	Nvizzio Creations	Nintendo Switch	Enhanced version of RollerCoaster Tycoon Touch

=== 2019 ===
Game	Released	Developer	Platform	Note
RollerCoaster Tycoon Adventures	March 19, 2019	Nvizzio Creations	Microsoft Windows	PC port of the Switch title
Blood: Fresh Supply	May 9, 2019	Nightdive Studios	Microsoft Windows	Remaster of Blood

== 2020s ==
=== 2020 ===
Game	Released	Developer	Platform	Note
RollerCoaster Tycoon Puzzle	January 30, 2020	Graphite Lab	iOS, Android	Match 3 puzzle game based on the RollerCoaster Tycoon franchise. Formerly known as RollerCoaster Tycoon Story.
Pong Quest	April 21, 2020	Chequered Ink	Microsoft Windows, PlayStation 4, Xbox One, Nintendo Switch	
Missile Command: Recharged	May 27, 2020	Adamvision Studios	Microsoft Windows, MacOS, Linux, Nintendo Switch, iOS, Android	Atari Recharged title, computer/Switch versions were delisted in 2022 in favor of an updated version
Atari Collection 1	May 20, 2020	N/A	Evercade	Published by Blaze Entertainment.
Atari Collection 2	May 20, 2020	N/A	Evercade	Published by Blaze Entertainment.
Atari Lynx Collection 1	November 27, 2020	N/A	Evercade	Published by Blaze Entertainment.
Atari Lynx Collection 2	November 27, 2020	N/A	Evercade	Published by Blaze Entertainment.

=== 2021 ===
Game	Released	Developer	Platform	Note
Qomp	February 4, 2021	Stuffed Wombat	Microsoft Windows, Linux	Indie game inspired by Pong
Centipede: Recharged	September 29, 2021	Adamvision Studios; SneakyBox	Microsoft Windows, MacOS, Linux, PlayStation 4, PlayStation 5, Xbox One, Xbox Series X/S, Nintendo Switch, Stadia	Atari Recharged title
Black Widow: Recharged	October 27, 2021	Adamvision Studios; SneakyBox	Microsoft Windows, MacOS, Linux, PlayStation 4, PlayStation 5, Xbox One, Xbox Series X/S, Nintendo Switch, Stadia	Atari Recharged title
Atari Arcade Collection 1	December 8, 2021	N/A	Evercade	Published by Blaze Entertainment.
Asteroids: Recharged	December 13, 2021	Adamvision Studios; SneakyBox	Microsoft Windows, MacOS, Linux, PlayStation 4, PlayStation 5, Xbox One, Xbox Series X/S, Nintendo Switch, Stadia	Atari Recharged title

=== 2022 ===
Game	Released	Developer	Platform	Note
Breakout: Recharged	February 10, 2022	Adamvision Studios; SneakyBox	Microsoft Windows, MacOS, Linux, PlayStation 4, PlayStation 5, Xbox One, Xbox Series X/S, Nintendo Switch, Stadia	Atari Recharged title
Tumblebugs	March 18, 2022	Wildfire Studios	Microsoft Windows	Steam publishing rights
Tempest 4000	March 22, 2022	Llamasoft	Nintendo Switch, Atari VCS	
Basic Math: Recharged	April 1, 2022		Web browser	Atari Recharged title. April Fools Day release.
Kombinera	April 7, 2022	Graphite Lab; Joystick	Microsoft Windows, MacOS, Linux, PlayStation 4, PlayStation 5, Xbox One, Xbox Series X/S, Nintendo Switch, iOS, Android	
Gravitar: Recharged	May 12, 2022 (Atari VCS); June 2, 2022 (other platforms)	Adamvision Studios; SneakyBox	Atari VCS, Microsoft Windows, MacOS, Linux, PlayStation 4, PlayStation 5, Xbox One, Xbox Series X/S, Nintendo Switch	Atari Recharged title
Yars: Recharged	August 23, 2022	Adamvision Studios	Microsoft Windows, MacOS, Linux, PlayStation 4, PlayStation 5, Xbox One, Xbox Series X/S, Nintendo Switch, Atari VCS	Atari Recharged title
Atari Mania	October 13, 2022	iLLOGIKA Studios	Microsoft Windows, Nintendo Switch, Atari VCS	
Missile Command: Recharged	November 1, 2022	Adamvision Studios; SneakyBox	Microsoft Windows, MacOS, Linux, PlayStation 4, PlayStation 5, Xbox One, Xbox Series X/S, Nintendo Switch	Atari Recharged title, updated version of 2020 title
Atari 50: The Anniversary Celebration	November 11, 2022	Digital Eclipse	Microsoft Windows, PlayStation 4, PlayStation 5, Xbox One, Xbox Series X/S, Nintendo Switch, Atari VCS	Compilation/documentary of Atari's history, containing various games within the periods

=== 2023 ===
Game	Released	Developer	Platform	Note
Akka Arrh	February 21, 2023	Llamasoft	Microsoft Windows, PlayStation 4, PlayStation 5, Xbox One, Xbox Series X/S, Nintendo Switch, Atari VCS	Based on an Atari arcade prototype that was stolen and the ROM distributed online
Caverns of Mars: Recharged	March 9, 2023	SneakyBox	Microsoft Windows, MacOS, Linux, PlayStation 4, PlayStation 5, Xbox One, Xbox Series X/S, Nintendo Switch, Atari VCS	Atari Recharged title
Atari Mania	April 4, 2023	iLLOGIKA Studios	PlayStation 4, PlayStation 5, Xbox One, Xbox Series X/S	
Pixel Ripped 1978	June 15, 2023	ARVORE Immersive Experiences	Microsoft Windows, PlayStation 5, Meta Quest	VR title, sequel in the Pixel Ripped series
Mr. Run and Jump	July 25, 2023	Graphite Lab; Heavy Horse Games	Microsoft Windows, MacOS, Linux, PlayStation 4, PlayStation 5, Xbox One, Xbox Series X/S, Nintendo Switch, Atari VCS	Remake/sequel to an Atari 2600 homebrew game of the same name
Quantum: Recharged	August 17, 2023	SneakyBox	Microsoft Windows, MacOS, Linux, PlayStation 4, PlayStation 5, Xbox One, Xbox Series X/S, Nintendo Switch, Atari VCS	Atari Recharged title
Days of Doom	September 21, 2023	SneakyBox	Microsoft Windows, PlayStation 4, PlayStation 5, Xbox One, Xbox Series X/S, Nintendo Switch, Atari VCS	
Haunted House	October 12, 2023	Orbit Studio	Microsoft Windows, PlayStation 4, PlayStation 5, Xbox One, Xbox Series X/S, Nintendo Switch, Atari VCS	Second reimagining of the arcade game of the same name
RollerCoaster Tycoon Adventures Deluxe	November 1, 2023	Graphite Lab; Nvizzio Creations	PlayStation 4, PlayStation 5, Xbox One, Xbox Series X/S, Nintendo Switch	Enhanced version of RollerCoaster Tycoon Adventures

=== 2024 ===
Game	Released	Developer	Platform	Note
Qomp2	February 20, 2024	Graphite Lab	Microsoft Windows, MacOS, Linux, PlayStation 4, PlayStation 5, Xbox One, Xbox Series X/S, Nintendo Switch, Atari VCS	Sequel to Qomp, reimagining of Pong
Lunar Lander Beyond	April 23, 2024	Dreams Unincorporated	Microsoft Windows, PlayStation 4, PlayStation 5, Xbox One, Xbox Series X/S, Nintendo Switch	Reimagining of Lunar Lander
NeoSprint	June 27, 2024	Headless Chicken Games	Microsoft Windows, PlayStation 4, PlayStation 5, Xbox One, Xbox Series X/S, Nintendo Switch, Atari VCS	Reboot of Sprint 2
Food Fight: Culinary Combat	July 4, 2024	Mega Cat Studios	Microsoft Windows, Linux	Reimagining of Food Fight
Yars Rising	September 10, 2024	WayForward	Microsoft Windows, PlayStation 4, PlayStation 5, Xbox One, Xbox Series X/S, Nintendo Switch, Atari VCS	Reimagining/sequel of Yars' Revenge
RollerCoaster Tycoon Classic	December 5, 2024	Origin8 Technologies	Nintendo Switch	

=== 2025 ===
Game	Released	Developer	Platform	Note
Graveyard Keeper - Undead Edition	February 21, 2025	Lazy Bear Games	Nintendo Switch	Physical release of Graveyard Keeper with all DLC included. Released under license from tinyBuild
Secret Neighbor and Hello Engineer - The Neighborhood Bundle	February 21, 2025	tinyBuild	Nintendo Switch	Physical release of Secret Neighbor and Hello Engineer
RollerCoaster Tycoon 3: Complete Edition	March 20, 2025	Frontier Developments	PlayStation 4, PlayStation 5, Xbox One, Xbox Series X/S	The original 2020 release for Windows and Nintendo Switch were initially released by Frontier Foundry
Breakout Beyond	March 25, 2025	Choice Provisions	PlayStation 4, PlayStation 5, Xbox One, Xbox Series X/S, Nintendo Switch, Microsoft Windows, Atari VCS	Reimagining of Breakout, originally intended for the Intellivision Amico
I, Robot	April 17, 2025	Llamasoft	PlayStation 4, PlayStation 5, Xbox One, Xbox Series X/S, Nintendo Switch, Microsoft Windows, Atari VCS	Remake of the game of the same name
Mighty Morphin Power Rangers: Rita's Rewind	May 30, 2025	Digital Eclipse	PlayStation 5, Nintendo Switch	Physical release
The Thing: Remastered	June 25, 2025	Nightdive Studios	PlayStation 5, Nintendo Switch	Physical release
Missile Command Delta	July 8, 2025	13AM Games; Mighty Yell	PlayStation 5, Nintendo Switch, Microsoft Windows	Reimagining of Missile Command
Golden Tee Arcade Classics	July 17, 2025	Digital Eclipse	PlayStation 4, PlayStation 5, Xbox One, Xbox Series X/S, Nintendo Switch, Microsoft Windows	Compilation of titles in the Golden Tee Golf series by Incredible Technologies
Adventure of Samsara	September 4, 2025	Ilex Games	PlayStation 4, PlayStation 5, Xbox One, Xbox Series X/S, Nintendo Switch, Microsoft Windows	
Bubsy in: The Purrfect Collection	September 9, 2025	Limited Run Games	PlayStation 5, Xbox Series X/S, Nintendo Switch, Microsoft Windows	Compilation of titles in the Bubsy series by Accolade, Inc.
Golden Tee Arcade Classics	October 24, 2025	Digital Eclipse	PlayStation 5, Nintendo Switch	Physical release
Mortal Kombat: Legacy Kollection	October 30, 2025	Digital Eclipse	PlayStation 4, PlayStation 5, Xbox One, Xbox Series X/S, Nintendo Switch, Nintendo Switch 2, Microsoft Windows	Compilation of previous titles in the Mortal Kombat franchise, published under license from Warner Bros. Games
The Thing: Remastered	June 25, 2025	Nightdive Studios	PlayStation 5, Nintendo Switch	Physical release
Blood: Refreshed Supply	December 4, 2025	Nightdive Studios	PlayStation 4, PlayStation 5, Xbox One, Xbox Series X/S, Nintendo Switch, Microsoft Windows	Updated version of Blood: Fresh Supply; Co-funded and supported by franchise owner Warner Bros. Games
Mortal Kombat: Legacy Kollection	December 12, 2025	Digital Eclipse	PlayStation 5, Xbox Series X/S, Nintendo Switch, Nintendo Switch 2	Physical release

=== 2026 ===
Game	Released	Developer	Platform	Note
Totally Reliable Delivery Service - Definitive Edition	February 13, 2026	We're Five Games	PlayStation 5, Nintendo Switch	Physical release
Rayman 30th Anniversary Edition	February 13, 2026	Digital Eclipse	PlayStation 5, Xbox Series X/S, Nintendo Switch, Microsoft Windows	Co-copyright holder for Digital Eclipse, published by Ubisoft
The Disney Afternoon Collection	February 26, 2026	Digital Eclipse	Nintendo Switch, Nintendo Switch 2	Original versions published by Capcom
RollerCoaster Tycoon 3 - Complete Edition	March 3, 2026	Frontier Developments	PlayStation 5, Nintendo Switch	Physical release Switch version previously released physically by Limited Run Games
Transport Tycoon Deluxe	March 12, 2026	Chris Sawyer	Microsoft Windows	Standalone re-release
Star Wars: Dark Forces Remaster	March 26, 2026	Nightdive Studios	PlayStation 5, Nintendo Switch	Physical release Switch version previously released physically by Limited Run Games
RollerCoaster Tycoon Classic	March 27, 2026	Graphite Lab	PlayStation 5, Xbox Series X/S	
Jay and Silent Bob: Chronic Blunt Punch	April 20, 2026	Interabang Entertainment	PlayStation 5, Xbox Series X/S, Nintendo Switch, Microsoft Windows	Published under Digital Eclipse
Bubsy 4D	May 22, 2026	Fabraz	PlayStation 4, PlayStation 5, Xbox One, Xbox Series X/S, Nintendo Switch, Nintendo Switch 2, Microsoft Windows	Sequel in the Bubsy franchise
RollerCoaster Tycoon Classic	May 28, 2026	Graphite Lab	PlayStation 4, Xbox One, Nintendo Switch 2	
Blood: Refreshed Supply	May 7, 2026	Nightdive Studios	Nintendo Switch 2	Updated version of Blood: Fresh Supply; Co-funded and supported by franchise owner Warner Bros. Games
The Disney Afternoon Collection	May 29, 2026	Digital Eclipse	Nintendo Switch, Nintendo Switch 2	Physical release
Rayman 30th Anniversary Edition	June 26, 2026	Digital Eclipse	PlayStation 5, Nintendo Switch	Physical release, published under license from Ubisoft
Sin: Reloaded	September 24, 2026	Nightdive Studios	PlayStation 4, PlayStation 5, Xbox One, Xbox Series X/S, Nintendo Switch, Microsoft Windows	Remaster of Sin
Toy Story: Retro Roundup!	October 15, 2026	Digital Eclipse	PlayStation 4, PlayStation 5, Xbox One, Xbox Series X/S, Nintendo Switch, Nintendo Switch 2, Microsoft Windows	
Toy Story 3 Complete Edition	October 15, 2026	Digital Eclipse	PlayStation 4, PlayStation 5, Xbox One, Xbox Series X/S, Nintendo Switch, Nintendo Switch 2, Microsoft Windows	Remaster of Toy Story 3
Godzilla: Destroy All Monsters Melee: Remastered	November 3, 2026	Pipeworks Software	PlayStation 5, Xbox Series X/S, Nintendo Switch, Nintendo Switch 2, Microsoft Windows	Remaster of Godzilla: Destroy All Monsters Melee
Barbie Rewind	November 12, 2026	Digital Eclipse	PlayStation 4, PlayStation 5, Xbox One, Xbox Series X/S, Nintendo Switch, Nintendo Switch 2, Microsoft Windows	
Thief: The Dark Project Remastered	December 3, 2026	Nightdive Studios	PlayStation 4, PlayStation 5, Xbox One, Xbox Series X/S, Nintendo Switch, Nintendo Switch 2, Microsoft Windows	Remaster of Thief: The Dark Project
Fatal Run 2089	2026	MNSTR Studio	PlayStation 4, PlayStation 5, Xbox One, Xbox Series X/S, Nintendo Switch, Microsoft Windows, Atari VCS	Reimagining of Fatal Run

=== Unknown date ===
Game	Released	Developer	Platform	Note
RollerCoaster Tycoon Wonderworks	TBA	Springloaded	Microsoft Windows	

== Cancelled/Sold Games ==
Game	Released	Developer	Platform	Reason
American McGee's Oz	2003	Ronin Games	Xbox, Microsoft Windows	Dropped by Atari following financial difficulties. Development on the project was stopped after American McGee could not find a new publisher.
Fugitive Hunter: War on Terror	2003	Black Ops Entertainment	PlayStation 2, Xbox, Microsoft Windows	Dropped by Atari for unknown reasons, picked up by Encore Software.
TimeShift	2006	Saber Interactive	Xbox 360	Originally previewed as Chronos in February 2004 and announced for the Xbox and Windows in January 2005 for a release in the fall. the game's development moved to the Xbox 360 and was frequently delayed. Due to financial issues, Atari sold the game's publishing rights to Vivendi Games in May 2006.

== Distribution only ==
=== Bandai/Namco Bandai Games ===
Title	Platform(s)	Release date	Publisher(s)	Region
Digimon Battle Spirit	Game Boy Advance	September 5, 2003	Bandai	Europe/Australia
Dragon Ball Z: Budokai	GameCube	November 14, 2003	Bandai	Europe
Dragon Ball Z: Budokai 2	PlayStation 2	November 14, 2003	Bandai	Europe
.hack//Infection Part 1	PlayStation 2	March 26, 2004	Bandai	Europe/Australia
Dragon Ball Z: Taiketsu	Game Boy Advance	March 26, 2004	Bandai	Europe
Digimon Racing	Game Boy Advance	April 30, 2004	Bandai	Europe/Australia
.hack//Mutation Part 2	PlayStation 2	June 18, 2004	Bandai	Europe/Australia
Digimon Battle Spirit 2	Game Boy Advance	August 27, 2004	Bandai	Europe/Australia
Dragon Ball Z: Supersonic Warriors	Game Boy Advance	August 27, 2004	Bandai	Europe
Ribbit King	GameCube, PlayStation 2	September 3, 2004	Bandai	Europe/Australia
.hack//Outbreak Part 3	PlayStation 2	September 10, 2004	Bandai	Europe/Australia
Digimon Rumble Arena 2	PlayStation 2, GameCube, Xbox	October 15, 2004	Bandai	Europe/Australia
Dragon Ball Z: Budokai 3	PlayStation 2	December 3, 2004	Bandai	Europe
.hack//Quarantine Part 4	PlayStation 2	December 10, 2004	Bandai	Europe/Australia
Dragon Ball Z: Budokai 2	GameCube	March 18, 2005	Bandai	Europe
Ghost in the Shell: Stand Alone Complex (Note: Packaging makes no mention of Atari, but Atari Europe still distributed the game.)	PlayStation 2	May 6, 2005	Bandai	Europe/Australia
Dragon Ball: Advanced Adventure	Game Boy Advance	June 17, 2005	Bandai	Europe
Dragon Ball Z: Budokai 3 - Collector's Edition	PlayStation 2	June 21, 2005	Bandai	Europe
Saint Seiya: The Sanctuary	PlayStation 2	June 30, 2005	Bandai	Europe/Australia
Digimon World 4	PlayStation 2	September 2, 2005	Bandai	Europe/Australia
One Piece: Grand Battle	PlayStation 2	October 7, 2005	Bandai	Europe/Australia
Dragon Ball Z: Budokai Tenkaichi	PlayStation 2	October 21, 2005	Bandai	Europe
Ghost in the Shell: Stand Alone Complex (Note: Packaging makes no mention of Atari, but Atari Europe still distributed the game.)	PSP	October 21, 2005	Bandai	Europe/Australia
Dragon Ball Z: Supersonic Warriors 2	Nintendo DS	February 3, 2006	Bandai	Europe
Dragon Ball Z: Shin Budokai	PlayStation Portable	May 26, 2006	Bandai	Europe
Tamagotchi Connection: Corner Shop	Nintendo DS	June 16, 2006	Bandai	Europe/Australia
Super Dragon Ball Z	PlayStation 2	July 28, 2006	Namco Bandai Games	Europe
Saint Seiya: The Sanctuary	PlayStation 2	September 29, 2006	Namco Bandai Games	Europe/Australia
Dragon Ball Z: Budokai Tenkaichi 2	PlayStation 2	November 3, 2006	Namco Bandai Games	Europe
Naruto: Ultimate Ninja	PlayStation 2	November 17, 2006	Namco Bandai Games	Europe/Australia
Tamagotchi Connection: Corner Shop 2	Nintendo DS	March 23, 2007	Namco Bandai Games	Europe
Dragon Ball Z: Budokai Tenkaichi 2	Wii	March 30, 2007	Namco Bandai Games	Europe
Gunpey DS	Nintendo DS	March 30, 2007	Namco Bandai Games	Europe
Naruto: Uzumaki Chronicles	PlayStation 2	May 25, 2007	Namco Bandai Games	Europe/Australia
Trioncube	Nintendo DS	June 8, 2007	Namco Bandai Games	Europe
Dragon Ball Z: Shin Budokai - Another Road	PlayStation Portable	June 22, 2007	Namco Bandai Games	Europe
Dragon Ball Z: Harukanaru Densetsu	Nintendo DS	August 31, 2007	Namco Bandai Games	Europe
Tamagotchi: Party On!	Wii	August 31, 2007	Namco Bandai Games	Europe
Naruto: Ultimate Ninja 2	PlayStation 2	October 19, 2007	Namco Bandai Games	Europe/Australia
Eternal Sonata	Xbox 360	October 19, 2007	Namco Bandai Games	Europe/Australia
Dragon Ball Z: Budokai Tenkaichi 3	PlayStation 2	November 9, 2007	Namco Bandai Games	Europe
Ace Combat 6: Fires of Liberation	Xbox 360	November 9, 2007	Namco Bandai Games	Europe/Australia
Dragon Ball Z: Budokai Tenkaichi 3	Wii	February 15, 2008	Namco Bandai Games	Europe
Namco Museum DS	Nintendo DS	February 22, 2008	Namco Bandai Games	Europe/Australia
Beautiful Katamari	Xbox 360	February 29, 2008	Namco Bandai Games	Europe/Australia
Naruto: Uzumaki Chronicles 2	PlayStation 2	March 7, 2008	Namco Bandai Games	Europe/Australia
Dragon Ball Z: Burst Limit	PlayStation 3, Xbox 360	June 6, 2008	Namco Bandai Games	Europe
Naruto: Ultimate Ninja Heroes 2: The Phantom Fortress	PlayStation Portable	July 11, 2008	Namco Bandai Games	Europe/Australia
Family Trainer	Wii	August 9, 2008	Namco Bandai Games	Europe/Australia
Smash Court Tennis 3	Xbox 360	August 29, 2008	Namco Bandai Games	Europe/Australia
Naruto: Ultimate Ninja 3	PlayStation 2	September 5, 2008	Namco Bandai Games	Europe/Australia
Naruto: Ultimate Ninja Storm	PlayStation 3	November 7, 2008	Namco Bandai Games	Europe/Australia
Tamagotchi Connection: Corner Shop 3	Nintendo DS	November 14, 2008	Namco Bandai Games	Europe/Australia
Dragon Ball: Origins	Nintendo DS	December 5, 2008	Namco Bandai Games	Europe
Dragon Ball Z: Infinite World	PlayStation 2	December 5, 2008	Namco Bandai Games	Europe
Eternal Sonata	PlayStation 3	February 13, 2009	Namco Bandai Games	Europe/Australia
Family Ski & Snowboard	Wii	February 27, 2009	Namco Bandai Games	Europe/Australia
Afro Samurai	PlayStation 3, Xbox 360	March 27, 2009	Namco Bandai Games	Europe/Australia
Dragonball Evolution	PlayStation Portable	April 17, 2009	Namco Bandai Games	Europe/Australia (as Distribution Partners)
Namco Museum Virtual Arcade	Xbox 360	May 15, 2009	Namco Bandai Games	Europe/Australia (as Distribution Partners)
Brain Exercise with Dr. Kawashima	Microsoft Windows	May 29, 2009	Namco Bandai Games	Europe/Australia (as Distribution Partners)
The Munchables	Wii	June 19, 2009	Namco Bandai Games	Europe/Australia (as Distribution Partners)
Tales of Vesperia	Xbox 360	June 26, 2009	Namco Bandai Games	Europe/Australia (as Distribution Partners)

=== Other ===
Title	Platform(s)	Release date	Publisher(s)	Region
Horizons: Empire of Istaria	Microsoft Windows	December 9, 2003	Artifact Entertainment	North America and Europe
GTR – FIA GT Racing Game	Microsoft Windows	March 29, 2005	10tacle Publishing	Western Europe
Archer Maclean's Mercury	PSP	September 2, 2005	Ignition Entertainment	United Kingdom, France and Germany
Space Invaders Revolution	Nintendo DS	September 2005	Rising Star Games	Europe excluding Nordic territories
GT Legends	Microsoft Windows	November 4, 2005	10tacle Publishing	Western Europe, Israel, South Africa, South America, Australia and New Zealand
Bubble Bobble Revolution	Nintendo DS	December 2, 2005	Rising Star Games	Europe excluding Nordic territories
Lunar: Genesis	Nintendo DS	February 17, 2006	Rising Star Games	Europe excluding Nordic territories
Rainbow Islands Revolution	Nintendo DS	April 28, 2006	Rising Star Games	Europe excluding Nordic territories
SBK: Snowboard Kids	Nintendo DS	April 28, 2006	Rising Star Games	Europe excluding Nordic territories
Swords of Destiny	PlayStation 2	June 30, 2006	Rising Star Games	Europe excluding Nordic territories
Bubble Bobble Evolution	PSP	September 29, 2006	Rising Star Games	Europe excluding Nordic territories
Mercury Meltdown	PSP	October 6, 2006	Ignition Entertainment	United Kingdom
GTR 2 – FIA GT Racing Game	Microsoft Windows	September 29, 2006	10tacle Publishing	Western Europe
The King of Fighters Neowave	PlayStation 2	October 13, 2006	Ignition Entertainment	United Kingdom
Space Invaders Evolution	PSP	November 3, 2006	Rising Star Games	Europe excluding Nordic territories
Neo Geo Battle Coliseum	PlayStation 2	November 24, 2006	Ignition Entertainment	United Kingdom
Mercury Meltdown Remix	PlayStation 2	November 30, 2006	Ignition Entertainment	United Kingdom
Blade Dancer: Lineage of Light	PSP	February 9, 2007	Ignition Entertainment	United Kingdom
Metal Slug Trilogy	PSP	February 9, 2007	Ignition Entertainment	United Kingdom
KOF: Maximum Impact 2	PlayStation 2	March 23, 2007	Ignition Entertainment	United Kingdom
Mercury Meltdown Revolution	Wii	June 8, 2007	Ignition Entertainment	Europe
The King of Fighters XI	PlayStation 2	July 6, 2007	Ignition Entertainment	United Kingdom
Race 07	Microsoft Windows	October 12, 2007	SimBin Studios	United Kingdom
You Are Empty	Microsoft Windows	October 16, 2007	1C Company	North America
Death to Spies	Microsoft Windows	October 16, 2007	1C Company	North America
Dawn of Magic	Microsoft Windows	October 16, 2007	1C Company	North America
SNK vs. Capcom: Card Fighters DS	Nintendo DS	December 17, 2007	Ignition Entertainment	United Kingdom
Teenage Zombies: Invasion of the Alien Brain Thingys!	Nintendo DS	March 28, 2008	Ignition Entertainment	United Kingdom
George of the Jungle	PlayStation 2, Wii, Nintendo DS	March 28, 2008	Ignition Entertainment	United Kingdom
NEVES	Nintendo DS	March 28, 2008	Ignition Entertainment	United Kingdom
Animal Paradise	Nintendo DS	September 23, 2008	Empire Interactive	North America
Pipe Mania	PlayStation 2, PlayStation Portable, Nintendo DS	September 26, 2008	Empire Interactive	North America
Unsolved Crimes	Nintendo DS	September 30, 2008	Empire Interactive	North America
Hello Kitty: Big City Dreams	Nintendo DS	November 11, 2008	Empire Interactive	North America
The Tale of Despereaux	Nintendo DS	December 2, 2008	Universal Pictures Digital Products Group	North America
EVE Online	Microsoft Windows (Physical Release)	March 2009	CCP Games	North America, Europe, South Asia
EVE Online: Commissioned Officer Edition	OS X (Physical release)	2010	CCP Games	North America, Europe, South Asia
The Witcher 2: Assassins of Kings	Microsoft Windows (Physical release)	May 17, 2011	CD Projekt	North America
TERA	Microsoft Windows (Physical Release)	May 1, 2012	En Masse Entertainment	North America

== See also ==
- List of Infogrames video games – for a list of Infogrames-labeled games by the same company
- List of Hasbro Interactive video games – for a list of Atari-labeled home games from 1998 to 2000
- Atari Games – for a list of Atari arcade games made until 1999
- Nightdive Studios – for a list of games by this studio
- Digital Eclipse – for a list of games by this studio
