= RollerCoaster Tycoon Wonderworks =

- Developer: Springloaded
- Publisher: Atari
- Series: RollerCoaster Tycoon
- Platform: Windows
- Genre: Construction and management simulation
- Mode: Single-player

RollerCoaster Tycoon Wonderworks is an upcoming construction and management simulation video game developed by Springloaded and published by Atari. It will be the fifth main installment in the RollerCoaster Tycoon series. The game was announced at Gamescom in August 2026 and is planned to release in early access later the same year.

Wonderworks is expected to play similarly to the first two games, RollerCoaster Tycoon (1999) and RollerCoaster Tycoon 2 (2002), with a retro-styled user interface and an isometric camera angle, but with a toy-like miniature diorama aesthetic. The game will feature an improved roller coaster designer, a more "accurate" physics model, and an event mechanic with over-the-top ride breakdowns. Furthermore, a Bubsy costume will be an available option for costumed entertainers.
