= RCT 1 =

RCT 1 or RCT-1 may refer to:

- 1st Marine Regiment (United States)
- RollerCoaster Tycoon (video game)
- Automatic knife made by Ravencrest Tactical
