= RollerCoaster Tycoon (video game) =

1999 video game

- Developers: Chris Sawyer; Frontier Developments (Xbox)
- Publisher: Hasbro Interactive (Note: Released under the MicroProse brand. The Xbox port was published by Infogrames.)
- Designer: Chris Sawyer
- Programmer: Chris Sawyer
- Artist: Simon Foster
- Composer: Allister Brimble
- Series: RollerCoaster Tycoon
- Platforms: Windows, Xbox
- Release: Windows: NA: March 22, 1999; EU: April 12, 1999; Xbox: NA/EU: March 25, 2003
- Genre: business sim
- Mode: Single-player

RollerCoaster Tycoon is a 1999 construction and management simulation video game developed, designed and programmed by Chris Sawyer. It was published by Hasbro Interactive under the MicroProse label for Windows. Frontier Developments developed an Xbox port, which was released in 2003. It is the first game in the RollerCoaster Tycoon series.

In the game, players build and manage amusement parks, constructing rides and shops, designing custom roller coasters, hiring staff, and meeting scenario objectives. Sawyer conceived the game after the commercial success of Transport Tycoon and wrote nearly all of it in x86 assembly language, with art by Simon Foster and music by Allister Brimble.

RollerCoaster Tycoon received positive reviews and became a commercial success, selling more than four million copies by July 2002. Two expansion packs were released for the game, Added Attractions/Corkscrew Follies and Loopy Landscapes, along with several compilations, re-releases, and sequels.

== Gameplay ==
The premise of the game is to complete a series of preset scenarios by successfully building and maintaining amusement parks through business ownership as a theme park entrepreneur. Players can choose from dozens of roller coaster types and can also build log flumes, carousels, bumper cars, haunted houses, go-karts, Ferris wheels, and swinging ships, among other rides.

A screenshot showing a log flume

The player may hire handymen to sweep paths, empty garbage cans, water flowers and mow lawns; mechanics to inspect and fix rides; security guards to prevent vandalism within the park; and entertainers to entertain the guests. The geography and landscaping of the park can be modified, allowing the player to lower/raise terrain and add water to improve the park's attractiveness, as well as to allow rides to fit into their surroundings more easily. Players must also balance the needs of the visitors by strategically placing food stalls, concession stands, bathrooms, and information kiosks.

The player also has the option of building their own roller coaster designs as well as other rides by laying out individual track pieces, choosing the direction, height, and steepness, and adding such elements as zero-g rolls, corkscrews, vertical loops, and even on-ride photos, using a tile-based construction system.

=== Scenarios ===
Dual-tracked roller coasters

There are 21 scenarios included with RollerCoaster Tycoon, as well as 30 more in the Corkscrew Follies expansion pack, and another 30 in the Loopy Landscapes expansion pack, totaling 81 scenarios if the whole set is installed. Successfully completing a scenario will unlock the next one. Additionally, Mega Park is unlocked when all 21 original scenarios are completed. This scenario has no objective (except "Have Fun!"), but allows the player to build on nearly the entire map, and eventually has all attractions available to build. This is the closest to a "sandbox" park, except the player does not have an unlimited amount of money to work with, only a $50,000 loan.

Some scenarios are based on real parks. For example, 'Katie's Dreamland' (Katie's World in the US Version) is based on Lightwater Valley, complete with that park's signature The Ultimate roller coaster (The Storm).

There were two official scenarios that were available for download on Hasbro's website: Fort Anachronism and Alton Towers. Alton Towers was included with the Loopy Landscapes expansion with Heide Park and Blackpool Pleasure Beach and was updated to take advantage of the new game components. Both scenarios are also included as part of RollerCoaster Tycoon Deluxe. The UK edition of RollerCoaster Tycoon Deluxe contained Blackpool Pleasure Beach in place of Fort Anachronism.

== Development ==
Scottish game designer Chris Sawyer released Transport Tycoon in 1994, and spent time to consider what to do for a sequel. Some of the revenue he earned from Transport Tycoon he used towards travelling in Europe and the United States, which included visits to theme parks with roller coasters. Though Sawyer said he had hated roller coasters before, he became fond of them through these trips, and since has become a roller coaster enthusiast and had ridden on at least 700 coasters. From these trips, Sawyer decided to follow Transport Tycoon with a roller coaster-based simulation, giving him a partial excuse to continue visiting theme parks to "research" roller coaster rides. The game was to be called White Knuckle for the majority of the game's development. However, to follow the tradition of the Tycoon titles, the game was renamed accordingly.

The game was developed in a small village near Dunblane over the course of two years. Sawyer wrote 99% of the code for RollerCoaster Tycoon in x86 assembly language for the Microsoft Macro Assembler, with the remaining one percent written in C. The graphics were designed by artist Simon Foster using several 3D modeling, rendering, and paint programs. Initially, Sawyer used family and friends to help playtest the game, and then turned to Hasbro, the publisher, to help complete more extensive bug-testing and feedback.

For his efforts, Sawyer made around $30 million in royalties. The Xbox port was handled by Frontier Developments, who would later go on to develop RollerCoaster Tycoon 3.

== Release ==
The game was first released in North America on March 22, 1999.

=== Expansion packs ===
Two expansion packs were released for RollerCoaster Tycoon that each include new rides, facilities, and scenarios. The first pack, Added Attractions (known in North America as Corkscrew Follies), was released in November 1999. The second pack, Loopy Landscapes, was released in September 2000. Loopy Landscapes notably included all of Added Attractions' content onto its disc.

=== Reissues and re-releases ===
In September 2001, Infogrames Europe released a compilation called Totally RollerCoaster, which included the base game and the Loopy Landscapes pack on separate discs.

In 2002, a compilation of the base game and both expansions in a single box, RollerCoaster Tycoon Gold was released by Infogrames in North America. It was re-released in 2003 as RollerCoaster Tycoon Deluxe, which included all the contents of Gold on a single disc.

Deluxe was later released on digital distribution platforms such as GOG.com and Steam and in July 2014, these versions were updated to include European language localizations, which were previously available as separate retail versions.

=== Xbox port ===
A version for the Xbox was also released in 2003, which was handled by Frontier Developments and was published by Infogrames. The port was mainly the same as the original PC version and included both expansion packs, with controls adapted for a controller.

== Reception ==
Reception

Aggregate scores
Aggregator	Score	
Aggregator	PC	Xbox
GameRankings	88%	N/A
Metacritic	N/A	62/100

Review scores
Publication	Score	
Publication	PC	Xbox
AllGame	3/5	N/A
Eurogamer	8/10	N/A
Game Informer	N/A	2/10
GamePro	9/10	N/A
GameRevolution	A	N/A
GameSpot	8.6/10	7/10
IGN	8.5/10	6/10
Jeuxvideo.com	15/20	9/20
PC Gamer (UK)	91/100	N/A

GameSpot's Alan Dunkin called it "another fun management simulation from the mind of Chris Sawyer." His praises included the custom naming of everything in the park and position-accurate, real-life sound effects. However, he disliked the limited speed of the game, reasoning that "when you're trying to manage your newest amusement park, time is ticking by, perhaps faster than you'd like." He also criticized the limited amount of scenarios and the player not being able to make their own. IGN's Jason Bates also called it a fun game. He wrote that making custom rides could take a very long time and be very frustrating at first, and players would have to pay too much cash to tasks such as changing land levels, re-positioning trees and build walkways, while they design their rollercoaster. However, once players mastered doing so, "You'll get a lot of pride out of designing some crazy, twisting corkscrew that winds in and out of lakes and hot dog stands, painting it bright neon pink and orange, and giving it a name like the Vominator. And then when the kids start lining up for those $5 tickets, you'll be ready to start saving up for your next ridiculous extravaganza." Game Revolution's Ben Silverman highlighted the game's graphical style: "The nature of the game just doesn't call for fancy graphics, and thankfully things run smoothly. The detail level is very cool, from the green-faced nauseous guest to the marquee scrolling the name of the ride at the entrance." He also praised the endless amount of possibilities in designing rollercoaster rides, as well as the huge amount of specific detail, such as the location of a food stall, the player should and can focus on of their park, with the only slight criticisms being the "sloppy" interface.

Gary Eng Walk of Entertainment Weekly, who graded the game an A, called it "Quite literally, the thrill ride of the summer", and in 2003, the magazine ranked RollerCoaster Tycoon number 68 on their list of the "100 greatest videogames". Aaron Curtis of Los Angeles Times praised the game, saying that it is "simple enough to enjoy right out of the box but sophisticated enough to keep even the most obsessive park planner happy for weeks."

The Xbox port received mixed ratings due to very little improvement. The only exclusive features are no menu buttons (they were accessed by holding the X and B buttons) and a magnifying glass cursor that can be toggled by clicking the left thumbstick.

RollerCoaster Tycoon won Computer Games Strategy Plus's 1999 "Strategy Game of the Year" award, and the editors hailed it as "a superb game that's virtually guaranteed to put a smile on the face of even the most jaded gamer." PC Gamer US and CNET Gamecenter nominated the game for their "Best Real-Time Strategy Game" awards, but these went to Age of Empires II: The Age of Kings and Homeworld, respectively. The former publication's editors wrote that RollerCoaster Tycoon "revived the theme park subgenre with its rock-solid design and addicting play." RollerCoaster Tycoon was also nominated for "Computer Game of the Year" and "Computer Strategy Game of the Year" during the AIAS' 3rd Annual Interactive Achievement Awards; both awards ultimately went to Age of Empires II: The Age of Kings. During the 4th Annual Interactive Achievement Awards, the expansion Loopy Landscapes was nominated for the "PC Simulation", "PC Game of the Year", and "Game of the Year" awards; the first award went to MechWarrior 4: Vengeance, while the latter two went to Diablo II.

=== Sales ===
According to PC Data, it was the third-best-selling PC game on the week of July 25, 1999, and rose to number two the next week. It was the second-best-selling PC title that same month, and was the third-best-selling of August of that year. It returned to number two on the week of August 29 – September 4, as well as taking the number-two spot again for the month of September. On January 18, 2000, RollerCoaster Tycoon was announced the best-selling PC game of 1999. Its sales in the United States totaled 719,535 units that year, for revenues of $19.6 million—the third-highest gross for 1999. Chris Sawyer said in response to the commercial success of the game, "I think everyone is a bit stunned by the sales success of RollerCoaster Tycoon, myself included. I always believed in the game concept myself, but I hadn't expected it to have so much widespread appeal among game players of all types." RollerCoaster Tycoon also received a "Gold" award from the Verband der Unterhaltungssoftware Deutschland (VUD) by the end of August 1999, for sales of at least 100,000 units across Germany, Austria and Switzerland.

RollerCoaster Tycoon proceeded to become a long-term success in the United States. GameSpot's Trey Walker noted in late 2001 that it had "appeared in the top 10 [weekly sales] lists almost continuously" during its first two years of release. Domestically, it sold another 749,749 units and earned $20.32 million from January through October 2000, according to PC Data. These numbers rose to 1.25 million units ($32.99 million) by the end of the year, which made it the second-biggest computer game seller of 2000, behind The Sims. RollerCoaster Tycoon's success continued in 2001: it placed again at #2 for the year, behind The Sims, and earned $21.9 million with 953,953 sales.

By July 2002, RollerCoaster Tycoon had sold over four million copies.

== Legacy ==
Several sequels would follow RollerCoaster Tycoon and its expansion packs: RollerCoaster Tycoon 2, RollerCoaster Tycoon 3, RollerCoaster Tycoon 3D, RollerCoaster Tycoon 4 Mobile and RollerCoaster Tycoon World. Features found in this game, along with RollerCoaster Tycoon 2, were included in RollerCoaster Tycoon Classic in 2017.

Several user-created rollercoasters received media attention after footage of them were posted on various imageboards and social media. (Note: Attributed to multiple references:)
