= RollerCoaster Tycoon Classic =

2016 video game

- Developer: Origin8 Technologies (Note: Ported to consoles by Graphite Lab.)
- Publisher: Atari
- Producer: Laurence McDonald
- Designer: Chris Sawyer
- Programmers: Steve Clark; Jason Austin; Chris Sawyer
- Artists: Simon Foster; Laurence McDonald
- Composer: Allister Brimble
- Series: RollerCoaster Tycoon
- Platforms: Android iOS; Microsoft Windows macOS; Nintendo Switch; Nintendo Switch 2 PlayStation 4 PlayStation 5 Xbox One; Xbox Series X/S
- Release: Android, iOS; December 22, 2016; Microsoft Windows, macOS; September 28, 2017; Nintendo Switch; December 5, 2024; PlayStation 5, Xbox Series X/S; March 27, 2026; PlayStation 4, Xbox One, Nintendo Switch 2; May 28, 2026
- Genre: Construction and management simulation
- Mode: Single-player

RollerCoaster Tycoon Classic is a construction and management simulation video game developed by Origin8 Technologies and published by Atari. The game is a port of both RollerCoaster Tycoon and RollerCoaster Tycoon 2 combined into a single game; both games were originally created by Chris Sawyer for the PC and utilize the same game engine. RollerCoaster Tycoon Classic also includes RollerCoaster Tycoon's two original expansion packs, Added Attractions (also known as Corkscrew Follies) and Loopy Landscapes, with the option to purchase the RollerCoaster Tycoon 2 expansions Wacky Worlds and Time Twister as DLC. RollerCoaster Tycoon Classic was released for Android and iOS in December 2016 and for Microsoft Windows and macOS in September 2017. A Nintendo Switch port was released on December 5, 2024, while a PlayStation 5 and Xbox Series X/S port was released on March 27, 2026. Nintendo Switch 2, PlayStation 4 and Xbox One ports were released on May 28 of the same year.

== Gameplay ==
Classic implements the same gameplay as the first two games in the RollerCoaster Tycoon series. Played from an isometric view, players are tasked with building or revitalizing an amusement park by adding rides, attractions, facilities, paths, landscaping, and staff to manage the park. In particular, the game allows players to plan out a wide array of custom roller coasters and other rides using tracks, such as log flumes and go-karts. The player also must manage the park's finances to make sure they bring in sufficient revenues from guests to cover the cost of running the park and installing new features.

== Development ==
Chris Sawyer had developed the original RollerCoaster Tycoon and its sequel RollerCoaster Tycoon 2, which released respectively in 1999 and 2002. The games had come out of his work developing a sequel to Transport Tycoon, which he released in 1994. Sawyer allowed Frontier Developments to develop RollerCoaster Tycoon 3 while he worked on Locomotion, a 2004 spiritual successor to Transport Tycoon.

Sawyer re-emerged in 2010 with the opening of 31X Ltd., his holding company for his Transport Tycoon intellectual property, and took 31X in a direction towards mobile development. Sawyer recognized that there was a demand for a game that used the more simple controls and graphics offered in the original Tycoon games, which worked well for mobile and touch-screen devices. In 2013, he announced the mobile version of Transport Tycoon, developed with Origin8. With Origin8's help, Sawyer was able to convert the original Transport Tycoon code from a form that relied heavily on assembly code to transfer it into a more portable form. Origin8 continued to work with Sawyer to help port RollerCoaster Tycoon into a similar mobile format.

In March 2016, Sawyer affirmed he had started work on RollerCoaster Tycoon Classic with Origin8, to be released for mobile devices. As with the rework of Transport Tycoon, this required Sawyer and Origin8 to rework the assembly code from RollerCoaster Tycoon 2 into C++. They were also able to add new elements to the game during this period.

The game was released for both Android and iOS devices on December 22, 2016. On that same day, Sawyer released a statement explaining his reason for developing the game: "It was my long term ambition to bring the classic game to modern touch screen devices as its visual style and tactile nature are so well suited to smartphones and tablets." Meanwhile, the CEO of Atari stated that the game should appeal to both long-time fans, as well as new players.

A Windows and macOS port of the game was released on September 28, 2017. The game was later ported to Nintendo Switch on December 5, 2024, the PlayStation 5 and Xbox Series X/S on March 27, 2026, and the PlayStation 4, Xbox One and Nintendo Switch 2 on May 28, 2026. The Switch 2 Edition includes enhanced resolution and support for the Joy-Con 2's mouse controls, and is also available as an upgrade pack for the original Switch release.

== Reception ==
Reception

Aggregate score
Aggregator	Score
Metacritic	iOS: 90/100

Review scores
Publication	Score
Nintendo Life	8/10
TouchArcade	iOS: 4.5/5

Bob Fekete of iDigitalTimes praised the game for faithfully porting the original games on mobile devices for a low price tag, but criticized the game's "cramped" feel and occasionally low framerates. Alex Olney of Nintendo Life praised the game, opining that the Nintendo Switch port is "the best way to play this classic in your living room." However, Olney criticized the lack of touch-screen support as well as some performance issues when the game is zoomed out.

Kotaku Australia was critical of the release, citing the system specification requirements—which are considerably higher than that of the original games—and the lack of multiplayer support, which had been added to the original game via the community-driven OpenRCT2 project. In 2022, an update to OpenRCT2 would allow the use of RollerCoaster Tycoon Classic as a base install path, rather than the original games.

== See also ==
- OpenRCT2
