= RollerCoaster Tycoon World =

2016 video game

- Cover art
- Developer: Nvizzio Creations
- Publishers: Atari; RCTO Productions
- Composer: Maxime Goulet
- Series: RollerCoaster Tycoon
- Engine: Unity
- Platform: Microsoft Windows
- Release: WW: 16 November 2016
- Genre: Construction and management simulation
- Mode: Single-player

RollerCoaster Tycoon World is a theme park construction and management simulation video game developed by Nvizzio Creations and published by Atari for Microsoft Windows. It is the fourth major installment in the RollerCoaster Tycoon series. The game was released on 16 November 2016 to largely negative reviews.

== Gameplay ==
Players are able to build rides, shops and roller coasters, while monitoring elements such as budget, visitor happiness and technology research. Unlike RollerCoaster Tycoon 4 Mobile, the game does not include any micro-transactions. Similar to RollerCoaster Tycoon 3, the game features 3D graphics instead of the 2D isometric style of the first two installments in the series. When building roller coasters, the game makes use of a spline system instead of the old style of laying individual pieces. Players are also allowed to "ride" the roller coasters and other rides, in either a first or third-person view. A new "Park Pulse" mechanic was also introduced that allows players to quickly find out how their park is doing and the customers' thoughts, similar to Zoo Tycoon titles.

The game contains several scenery and ride themes at launch, with more in development that will be released via free updates and paid expansion packs. The game also introduces an "Architect mode", allowing players to plan and layout the coaster's model before constructing the coasters. Similar to the past installments, there are four different types of coasters available to build: steel, inverted, wooden, and launch-track coasters. In addition, there are ten roller coasters per type. Coasters can be built freeform or the player can place pre-made designs into their park. Unlike in the previous games, the roller coaster train may fly off the tracks if the roller coaster is built incorrectly. As a result, a new "safety-rating" option and medical staff has been added. User-generated content (including custom scenery) was available from release, as well as Steam Workshop support. While terrain and environments are randomly generated in a map, players can still gain access to a terrain editor.

== Development ==
When Atari announced RollerCoaster Tycoon 4 Mobile, they also promised that a title for Windows was also being developed. The game was officially announced in August 2014 during Gamescom 2014 with a teaser trailer, Pipeworks Software as its developer, and a release date of early 2015. Multiplayer features not found in previous versions of the RollerCoaster Tycoon series were planned, including cooperative park-building, visiting parks built by others, and global competition between groups of parks in the form of theme park companies. World also planned to support user-generated assets. The first screenshots and details of the game were revealed during PAX Prime 2014.

Part way through development, Area 52 Games replaced Pipeworks Software as the developer of the game, a change which Atari did not explain. A closed alpha was also in development. A new trailer showing gameplay was uploaded on 5 March 2015, showing an intro featuring POV footage of Goliath and Colossus at Six Flags Magic Mountain. The trailer was criticized for its poor graphics. Area 52 responded by saying that the pre-alpha build shown in the trailer were used placeholder graphics, and the final release would be upgraded to use the Unity 5.0 engine from the build's Unity 4.6.

Atari later said that a third developer had taken over from Area 52 Games, later confirmed to be Nvizzio Creations. At the NVIDIA booth on PAX Prime 2015, Atari unveiled interactive gameplay for the game showing off their development build that featured coaster building and sandbox mode. On 29 September, it was announced the release date would be 10 December. Two beta weekends preceded the release of the game. The first beta weekend was the last weekend of October and this beta was focused on the new spline-based Coaster Builder. The first beta weekend took place as planned. However, feedback from this beta weekend led to Atari deciding to delay the game's release to early 2016. The developer noted the additional development time would allow them to add requested items and features such as "predefined piece" coaster building, additional coaster test feedback, a robust fencing tool, improved on-demand grid, and various smaller improvements." Consequently, the second beta weekend was also delayed from November to December.

== Release ==
Atari had decided that its theme park game, RollerCoaster Tycoon World, would be launched into Early Access on 30 March, instead of going with a full release. The early access release was met with negative reviews, mostly complaining about the poor graphics, coaster builder, lack of detail, and ride animations. In November 2016, Atari announced that the game would be released on November 16, 2016, one day before the release of Planet Coaster, a spiritual successor to RollerCoaster Tycoon 3 developed and published by the same studio that made the latter, Frontier Developments.

The game was available for both standard and deluxe editions. The deluxe edition contained two additional maps, terrain texture additions, a digital art book, a gold park entrance, and the panda mascot from the previous games.

== Reception ==
Reception

Aggregate score
Aggregator	Score
Metacritic	43/100

Review score
Publication	Score
Eurogamer	Avoid

=== Pre-release ===
A trailer released by Atari containing gameplay of RollerCoaster Tycoon World was received poorly by critics and fans. Some critics noted that the game appears graphically worse than 2004's RollerCoaster Tycoon 3 and that it "looks little better than a basic mobile game." Atari later issued a statement that the game was still in "pre-alpha" stages, and that the graphics were not yet coded to their full resolution and would also receive a major overhaul when the game's engine is upgraded from Unity 4.6 to Unity 5.0. They also promised that the new visuals would be of higher definition and higher level of realism.

=== Release ===
RollerCoaster Tycoon World was met with negative reactions by critics. According to review aggregator website Metacritic, the game holds a score of 43 out of 100, based on seven reviews.

In a 2016 review, Eurogamer criticised syncing issues with Steam cloud, the low performance, and poor animation and art design. It also said the career mode is not challenging and only requires the player to complete basic objectives in a scenario without completing a park. However, it praised the basic functions of building paths and custom roller coasters using the spline design system. Eurogamer ultimately suggests to avoid the game.

TechRaptor rated the game a 1/10, citing the large interface and variety of bugs and glitches within the game.

== See also ==
- Parkitect
- Planet Coaster
- Theme Park Studio
