= Chris Sawyer =

Scottish video game designer

- Born: Christopher Sawyer
- Education: University of Strathclyde
- Occupations: Video game designer Video game programmer
- Years active: 1983–2005; 2010–2017
- Known for: Transport Tycoon; RollerCoaster Tycoon
- Website: www.chrissawyergames.com

Christopher Sawyer is a Scottish video game designer and programmer. He is best known for creating Transport Tycoon, which has been considered "one of the most important simulation games ever made", and the bestselling RollerCoaster Tycoon series.

Sawyer began his career developing eleven games published for the Memotech MTX in 1984–5, some of which were clones of existing arcade video games. In the late 1980s and early 1990s he ported nine games from the Amiga and other systems to MS-DOS. From 1994 to 2004 he designed and programmed a series of Tycoon games, which became hallmarks of the simulation genre. After a period away from the gaming industry in the late 2000s, Sawyer founded the mobile game studio 31X which has handled modern ports of his work. Wired has described Sawyer as "one of gaming's greatest enigmas" given his legendary contributions to the genre while maintaining little presence online, and rarely agreeing to give interviews.

== Early life ==
Sawyer was raised in Scotland. He had an interest in computers and programming from an early age, writing programs in BASIC on a ZX81 at a local store in Doune. Being unable to afford a BBC Micro, Sawyer purchased a Camputers Lynx with which he wrote programs in machine code. He graduated with a degree in Computer Science and Microprocessor Systems from the University of Strathclyde in Glasgow.

== Career ==
=== Memotech games and MS-DOS ports (1983–1993) ===
Sawyer wrote games in Z80 machine code on his Memotech MTX home computer (which possessed a built-in assembler) and then later on an Amstrad CPC series home computer. He sent tapes containing his games to Memotech, who arranged first publications of his titles. During this period he released a total of 11 Memotech games. and two titles with Ariolasoft. Sepulcri in 1986, an Amstrad CPC port of the MTX game Sepulcri Scelerati with modified art work and Ziggurat, released under its Reaktor label in 1988. A PC game which he developed at university was rejected for publication by Ariolasoft, though the company had offered him a job after he graduated. Ariolasoft was downsized before that could happen. Megastar failed to pay royalties on continued sales of his games, and the income was only enough to buy a disk drive and printer.

From 1988 to 1993, Sawyer converted games from other systems, primarily the Amiga, to MS-DOS. These include Virus, Conqueror, Campaign, Birds of Prey, Dino Dini's Goal, and Frontier: Elite II. Sawyer improved on the Amiga version of Frontier by adding texture mapping.

=== Tycoon games (1994–2004) ===
Inspired by Sid Meier's Railroad Tycoon, Sawyer began to develop his own games making use of an isometric game world system he had been designing as a personal project. His management simulation game Transport Tycoon was released by MicroProse in 1994 and became a classic of the Tycoon series. A year later, he improved and extended the game as Transport Tycoon Deluxe. The game sold well, and Sawyer immediately sought to create a sequel.

While working on the game engine for this sequel, Sawyer began development of RollerCoaster Tycoon. Sawyer had been interested in the engineering aspect of roller coasters for some years, but had only ridden a handful of them, including Wild Mouse at Blackpool Pleasure Beach and Thunder Loop Express at Loudoun Castle. He developed the game in x86 assembly language by himself, using only the services of freelance graphic designer Simon Foster and composer Allister Brimble. Sawyer later used some of the revenue from Transport Tycoon to travel across Europe and the United States, and developed a lifelong interest in roller coasters. After creating RollerCoaster Tycoon, he again resumed work on the sequel for Transport Tycoon, but again postponed it to create RollerCoaster Tycoon 2, which launched in 2002.

Upon completing that project, he returned to work on the Transport Tycoon successor, which finally released in 2004 as Chris Sawyer's Locomotion. The game was built atop the engine used by RollerCoaster Tycoon, which by that point appeared dated, and the AI and user interface were poorly received. Sawyer also served as a consultant for Atari in the development of RollerCoaster Tycoon 3, which was designed by Frontier Developments and released later in 2004. Sawyer had understood that further development of the franchise would require 3D graphics but was not interested and left the work to Frontier.

=== Departure from industry (2005–2010) ===
In November 2005, Sawyer sued Atari, claiming that they had failed to pay him certain royalties. Atari counter-sued Sawyer for damages in 2007, and the two settled out of court for an undisclosed amount paid to Sawyer in February 2008. Due to a combination of the legal issues with Atari, and a general distaste of the violent nature of video games of the time, Sawyer temporarily stepped away from video games after the release of Locomotion. In an interview, Sawyer also cited a desire to take a break after working on games for 20 years, to spend more time on his personal interests. Asked about the period by Wired he replied that he "made a few trips to ride roller coasters around the world."

=== 31X & Tycoon rereleases (2010–2017) ===
In 2010, Sawyer founded 31X Ltd. which he initially planned to use as a holding company for the Transport Tycoon intellectual property. However, he saw that there was interest in a mobile version of Transport Tycoon and a space in the market for simulation games like this, and reworked 31X to be a video game developer focused on mobile games. In addition to Sawyer, several others that worked with him on the Tycoon games became part of 31X, including Jacqui Lyons, who worked with Sawyer for more than 20 years, serving as the company's executive producer.

31X's first product was Transport Tycoon for iOS and Android, released in 2013, which was assisted with Origin8. Sawyer continued to work with Origin8 to bring the first two RollerCoaster Tycoon games into RollerCoaster Tycoon Classic released for mobile in December 2016. The game later received ports to Microsoft Windows and macOS in September 2017.

=== Second departure (2017–present) ===
After the completion of Classic, Sawyer "...decided to take a back seat again and devote more time to other aspects of [his] life." Asked about future projects in 2016 he said "I'd never rule out creating a new original game but I think it's unlikely. I feel like I'm getting on a bit now age-wise and want to take things a bit easier!" He has also indicated that there is no need for a solo assembly coder such as himself in the modern games industry. Asked about the future in 2020, he replied “I also feel I've now created all the games I wanted to create... and working on someone else's game designs just doesn't excite me.”

Atari continues to produce titles using the RollerCoaster Tycoon intellectual property under licence from Sawyer. He has little involvement with these titles, beyond playing the occasional build. In 2022, Sawyer extended Atari's rights to the franchise for another decade. For the franchise's 25th anniversary in 2024, Atari sold a number of art pieces autographed by Sawyer. On 1 November 2024, Atari announced that Sawyer had entered into an agreement to allow it to acquire the Transport Tycoon intellectual property.

In an October 2026 interview, Sawyer said he was writing Python code for home automation projects using a Raspberry Pi touchscreen.

== Development style ==
Asked about his philosophy and style for game design, Sawyer indicated that he had "just kind of worked on ideas which I thought were fun at the time." He has identified a Lego-like approach to his work, in which the player deals with small, individual components that go on to be part of larger, more intricate systems. He has also expressed a dislike of modern 3D graphics, describing this as a reason he let Frontier develop RollerCoaster Tycoon 3. "The world of games moved on and I didn't, and I miss the flawed style and clunky simplicity of games from 20 years ago. I admire the amazing graphics and awesome size and realism of many modern games but for some reason can't summon much enthusiasm to play them."

== Personal life ==
Sawyer values privacy, rarely gives interviews and does not have a social media presence. Asked about his relative lack of a public online presence in 2013 he said that social media "takes time away from what I need to concentrate on"; he added in 2016 that he prefers "to let the games do the talking". He volunteers with the media team at a local primary school. Sawyer travels the world to visit roller coasters as an enthusiast, and gave his "coaster count" at 770 in 2024. He gave his favourites as Taron (Phantasialand, Germany), Zadra (Energylandia, Poland), Balder (Liseberg, Sweden), and Ravine Flyer II (Waldameer & Water World, USA).

== Games ==
Year	Title	Publisher
1984	Qogo	Oxford Data
1985	Chamberoids	Megastar Games
1985	Arcazion	Syntax Soft
1985	Escape from Zarcos	Megastar Games
1985	Missile Kommand	Syntax Soft
1985	Mission Omega	Syntax Soft
1985	Revenge of the Chamberoids	Megastar Games
1985	Sepulcri Scelerati	Megastar Games
1985	Target Zone	Syntax Soft
1985	Qogo 2	Megastar Games
1985	Quazzia	Megastar Games
1988	Virus (MS-DOS port)	Firebird Software
1989	Revenge of Defender (MS-DOS port)	Epyx
1990	Xenomorph (MS-DOS port)	Pandora
1990	Conqueror (MS-DOS port)	Rainbow Arts
1991	Elite Plus (MS-DOS port)	Microplay Software
1991	Birds of Prey (MS-DOS port)	Electronic Arts
1992	Campaign (MS-DOS port)	Empire Interactive
1993	Dino Dini's Goal (MS-DOS port)	Virgin Games
1993	Frontier: Elite II (MS-DOS port)	GameTek, Konami
1994	Transport Tycoon	MicroProse
1995	Transport Tycoon World Editor	MicroProse
1995	Transport Tycoon Deluxe	MicroProse
1995	Frontier: First Encounters	GameTek
1999	RollerCoaster Tycoon	Hasbro Interactive
2002	RollerCoaster Tycoon 2	Infogrames
2004	RollerCoaster Tycoon 3 (Note: As a consultant)	Atari, Inc.
2004	Chris Sawyer's Locomotion	Atari, Inc.
2016	RollerCoaster Tycoon Classic	Atari, Inc.
