= My Horse & Me =

2007 video game

- Developer: Woedend! Games
- Publisher: Atari Europe
- Composer: Eljo Bosman
- Platforms: Wii, Nintendo DS, Microsoft Windows
- Release: Wii, Nintendo DS: EU: November 23, 2007; NA: February 5, 2008; Microsoft Windows: EU: November 30, 2007; NA: February 19, 2008
- Genre: Simulation (Show jumping)
- Modes: Single-player, Multiplayer

My Horse & Me is a simulation video game published by Atari Europe for the Nintendo Wii, Nintendo DS, and Windows. It is the first game released by Atari under their exclusive partnership with the FEI.

== History ==
=== Development ===
Dane Cypel, the assistant producer, explained that the team was running out of ideas, and that horses seemed to be the most interesting project that they could create within the family-friendly animal-themed genre they were aiming to target. The team liked how horses were both graceful and powerful. In doing research on horses and discovering their different personalities, Cypel deemed it an "educational" experience.

Cypel acknowledges that while the game was targeted towards girls, he felt that girls like boys would switch off if there wasn't good gameplay underneath the title, and so put a lot of effort into making the title appealing to young female players.

=== Release ===
The Wii and Microsoft Windows versions were developed by W!Games. The Wii version was released in the United States on February 5, 2008 and in Europe on November 23, 2007. The Microsoft Windows version was released in the United States: on February 19, 2008 and in Europe on November 30, 2007. The Nintendo DS version was developed by Mistic Software, released in the United States on February 5, 2008 and in Europe on November 23, 2007.

The game was followed with My Horse & Me 2, released a year later (Known as My Horse & Me: Riding For Gold in North America).

== Plot and gameplay ==
My Horse And Me simulates owning a real horse, as well as learning to ride and grooming your horse. After completing training exercises, players can compete in the career mode. Throughout the game, gamers are able to unlock mini games, new tack, and appearances for you and your horse.

== Critical reception ==
=== Wii and PC ===
Game Vortex felt the game wouldn't appeal gamers or aspiring riders alike. IGN felt the title was a passable game for adolescent girls, and criticised its "poor" design and "ugly" visuals. GameZone felt it was a fun game for young girls, and that it can be fun despite the confusing controls. Nintendojo thought the game was boring and generic.

=== Nintendo DS ===
IGN wrote that the game was functional yet not fun.

== See also ==
- My Horse & Me 2
