= Qomp2 =

2024 video game

qomp2
- Developer: Graphite Lab
- Publisher: Atari
- Platforms: Atari VCS, Nintendo Switch, PlayStation 4, PlayStation 5, Xbox One, Xbox Series X/S
- Release: WW: February 20, 2024
- Genre: Puzzle-platform
- Mode: Single-player

Qomp2 (stylized as qomp2) is a 2024 puzzle-platform video game developed by Graphite Lab and published by Atari. It was released for Atari VCS, Nintendo Switch, PlayStation 4, PlayStation 5, Xbox One and Xbox Series X/S on February 20, 2024. The game is the sequel to the mobile game Qomp, a platformer reinterpretation of Pong. Upon release, the game received generally favorable reviews.

== Gameplay ==
Gameplay screenshot

Qomp2 is a puzzle game that takes place across 30 levels. Players control a ball, constantly moving at an angle, by directing its upward or downward movement using a single button. A boost can accelerate the speed of the ball. Throughout the game, players navigate puzzles that require bypassing obstacles using the movement of the ball.

== Development ==
Qomp2 was developed by St. Louis-based studio Graphite Lab, who previously developed Mr. Run and Jump and Kombinera for Atari. It is a sequel to the 2021 title Qomp, developed by Stuffed Wombat, a studio unaffiliated with the sequel although supportive of the game. Publisher Atari announced the game in August 2023, and marketed the game as a "creative sequel" to the title Pong. Lead designer Brad Austrin and executive producer Matt Raithel stated the vision of the game began on "expanding the narrative" of Qomp, developing an initial pitch and game design document after researching the original title to create a faithful successor. From this, the creators conceived of a "standalone story" with a loose connection to the ending of the original game, imagining "a ball trapped in a timeless cycle of Pong eventually [manifesting] into a circular mutation". The game's announced relationship to Pong was met with a skeptical reception from critics: GamesRadar stated the connection "seems tangential at best", and Rock Paper Shotgun considered the game more of a "thinly rebranded Qomp sequel", critiquing the "cynical handling" of the Atari license and back catalogue.

== Reception ==
Reception

Aggregate scores
Aggregator	Score
Metacritic	85/100
OpenCritic	57% recommend

Review scores
Publication	Score
Gamezebo	4.5/5
Nintendo Life	6.4/10
Nintendo World Report	7.5/10
TouchArcade	4.5/5
Nintendojo	A−

Qomp2 received "generally favorable" reviews, according to review aggregator Metacritic. Fellow review aggregator OpenCritic assessed that the game received fair approval, being recommended by 57% of critics.
