= Transworld Surf =

2001 video game

- North American Xbox cover art
- Developer: Angel Studios
- Publisher: Infogrames, Inc. (Note: Released under the Atari brand name)
- Platforms: Xbox, PlayStation 2, GameCube
- Release: Xbox: NA: November 15, 2001; PAL: March 14, 2002; PlayStation 2: NA: April 30, 2002; PAL: October 4, 2002; GameCube: NA: March 18, 2003
- Genre: Sports
- Modes: Single-player, multiplayer

Transworld Surf (titled Transworld Surf: Next Wave on GameCube) is a sports video game developed by Angel Studios and published by Infogrames, Inc.. The game was released for GameCube, PlayStation 2, and Xbox between November 2001 and March 2003. The Xbox version of the game was the third game released under Infogrames' newly-revamped Atari label.

== Reception ==
Reception

Aggregate score
Aggregator	Score		
Aggregator	GameCube	PS2	Xbox
Metacritic	68/100	76/100	76/100

Review scores
Publication	Score		
Publication	GameCube	PS2	Xbox
Edge	N/A	N/A	3/10
Electronic Gaming Monthly	N/A	N/A	6.5/10
Game Informer	5.5/10	N/A	5.5/10
GamePro	N/A	4/5	4.5/5
GameRevolution	N/A	N/A	B
GameSpot	7.1/10	7.4/10	8/10
GameSpy	2/5	70%	81%
GameZone	N/A	8/10	7/10
IGN	7.9/10	7.8/10	8.8/10
Next Generation	N/A	N/A	2/5
Nintendo Power	3.1/5	N/A	N/A
Official U.S. PlayStation Magazine	N/A	3.5/5	N/A
Official Xbox Magazine (US)	N/A	N/A	8.2/10
The Cincinnati Enquirer	N/A	4/5	N/A

The PlayStation 2 and Xbox versions received "favorable" reviews, while the GameCube version received "average" reviews, according to video game review aggregator Metacritic. However, NextGen said of the Xbox version, "The water effects are cool, as is the soundtrack, but with an unforgivably steep learning curve and that intrinsic repetitiveness, only the most extreme fanatics of the stunt genre will get much joy out of this."

The same Xbox version was nominated for GameSpot's annual "Best In-Game Water" award at the Best and Worst of 2001 Awards, which went to Wave Race: Blue Storm.
