= My Horse & Me 2 =

2008 video game

- Developers: Tate Interactive; Mistic Software (Nintendo DS)
- Publisher: Atari Europe
- Composers: Puk Sound, Dariusz Puk
- Series: My Horse & Me
- Platforms: Xbox 360, PlayStation 2, Wii, Microsoft Windows, Nintendo DS
- Release: Wii: EU: October 31, 2008; NA: April 30, 2009; Xbox 360: EU: October 31, 2008; Nintendo DS: EU: November 14, 2008; NA: March 26, 2009; PlayStation 2, Windows: EU: November 14, 2008
- Genre: Racing
- Mode: Single-player

My Horse & Me 2 (Known in North America as My Horse & Me: Riding for Gold) is a horse racing video game developed by Tate Interactive and published by Atari Europe. It is the sequel to My Horse & Me.
