= Qomp =

2021 video game

qomp
- Developer: Stuffed Wombat
- Publisher: Atari
- Designer: Joshua Hollendonner
- Programmer: Gustavo Chico
- Artist: Miroslav Marinov
- Composer: Britt Brady
- Platforms: Windows, Linux
- Release: WW: 4 February 2021
- Genre: Puzzle-platform
- Mode: Single-player

Qomp (stylized as qomp) is a 2021 puzzle-platform video game developed by Stuffed Wombat and published by Atari for Windows and Linux. Upon release, the game received positive reviews, with critics praising the game's minimalistic design, gameplay variety and short length. A sequel, qomp2, was released in 2024.

== Gameplay ==
Gameplay screenshot

Players control the direction of a constantly moving square ball by clicking the mouse, which reverts the vertical angle of direction of the ball. Players must navigate the ball through a maze with hazards, including spikes or rotating blades. Players must unlock doors by collecting keys throughout a level to progress. When entering a body of water, the square ball has additional weight, changing the physics of the ball's motion. After completing all levels in the game, players can replay the game with more challenging versions of each level.

== Development ==
Qomp was created by Stuffed Wombat, the pseudonym of Austrian independent developer Joshua Hollendonner. Describing the project as a "small game about freedom", Hollendonner stated he intended the game to be a small project, and confined its scope and content to reflect this purpose. Under the working title Pomg, development commenced in 2017 and went through several iterations. Development of the first iteration of the game was affected by the collapse of its original publisher, Sindiecate, in 2019. Hollendonner was able to continue development in 2020 following funding of the game from independent developer Mario Zechner, after experiencing financial difficulties with the project. Hollendonner also involved several co-creators to complete the project, including programmer Gustavo Chico, sound designer Britt Brady and artist Miroslav Marinov. In 2024, publisher Atari released a sequel, Qomp2, developed by Graphite Lab. Hollendonner was not involved with the project, although expressed support and was "really excited to see how Atari is carrying our work forward".

== Reception ==
Stating that Qomp delivered on its "goals of being a simple, clever, enjoyable game", Josh Kuchera of Polygon highlighted the simplicity of the game as a "welcome respite" from more complex titles due to having "perfected its own limited scope", later naming the game as one of the best titles of 2021. Slant Magazine also named the game one of the best of the year, with Ryan Aston praising the game's "incredibly amount of gameplay variety" and "satisfying" ending. Similarly, Vincent Acovino of Wired praised the game for its simplicity and accessibility, whilst "cleverly [subverting] its key mechanic several times" and having a "simple but always-evolving gameplay mechanic that's constantly surprising the player". Gary Hartley of Honest Gamers stated the game featured "tons of cool ideas", highlighting its challenge, "unique control scheme", and short length.
