= RollerCoaster Tycoon =

Video game series

- Logo from the first game
- Genre: Construction and management simulation
- Developers: Chris Sawyer (1999–2002); Frontier Developments (2003–2004, 2020); n-Space (2012); On5 (2014); Nvizzio Creations (2016–present); Graphite Lab (2020)
- Publishers: Hasbro Interactive (1999–2001); Infogrames (2001–2003); Atari (2003–present); RCTO Productions (2016–present); Frontier Foundry (2020); Aspyr (2020)
- Creator: Chris Sawyer
- Platforms: Windows, Xbox, macOS, iOS, Nintendo 3DS, Android, Nintendo Switch, PlayStation 4, Xbox One, PlayStation 5, Xbox Series X/S, Nintendo Switch 2
- First release: RollerCoaster Tycoon (1999)
- Latest release: RollerCoaster Tycoon Wonderworks (2026)

RollerCoaster Tycoon is a series of construction and management simulation games about building and managing an amusement park. Each game in the series challenges players with open-ended amusement park management and development, and allowing players to construct and customize their own unique roller coasters and other thrill rides.

The first game was created by Scottish programmer Chris Sawyer, with assistance from leading figures from the real-world roller coaster and theme park industry. The rest of the series contains three other main games, expansion packs, a number of ports, and a mobile instalment. A refresh of the series, RollerCoaster Tycoon World, was released in November 2016, and followed up by RollerCoaster Tycoon Adventures for Nintendo Switch in 2018 and PC in 2019.

RollerCoaster Tycoon was published by Hasbro Interactive; Infogrames published the sequel RollerCoaster Tycoon 2. Licensing for the series remained with the company renamed Atari Interactive in 2003, who renewed their deal with Chris Sawyer on 11 October 2022, for ten more years. With Roller Coaster Tycoon 3, Atari, Inc. became the publisher.

== Main series ==
Release timeline
1999	RollerCoaster Tycoon
2000
2001
2002	RollerCoaster Tycoon 2
2003
2004	RollerCoaster Tycoon 3
2005
2006
2007
2008
2009
2010
2011
2012	RollerCoaster Tycoon 3D
2013
2014	RollerCoaster Tycoon 4 Mobile
2015	RollerCoaster Tycoon 3: Mobile Edition
2016	RollerCoaster Tycoon World
2016	RollerCoaster Tycoon Classic
2016	RollerCoaster Tycoon Touch
2017
2018	RollerCoaster Tycoon Adventures
2018	RollerCoaster Tycoon Joyride
2019
2020	RollerCoaster Tycoon Puzzle
2021
2022
2023
2024
2025
2026	RollerCoaster Tycoon Wonderworks

=== RollerCoaster Tycoon ===
RollerCoaster Tycoon was released for Microsoft Windows on 21 March 1999. RollerCoaster Tycoon was later ported to the Xbox Video game console in 2003. The game was developed by Chris Sawyer and published by Hasbro Interactive under the MicroProse brand.

RollerCoaster Tycoon received two expansion packs: Added Attractions (released in North America as Corkscrew Follies) in 1999, and Loopy Landscapes in 2000. Two special editions were released: RollerCoaster Tycoon Gold/Totally RollerCoaster in 2002, which contained the original game, Corkscrew Follies, and Loopy Landscapes; and RollerCoaster Tycoon Deluxe in 2003, which contained the content in Gold plus more designs for the different customizable rides.

A port for the Xbox was released on 23 March 2003, handled by Frontier Developments and published by Infogrames. This version featured both expansion packs as well.

=== RollerCoaster Tycoon 2 ===
RollerCoaster Tycoon 2 was released on 15 October 2002. The game was developed by Chris Sawyer and published by Infogrames.

RollerCoaster Tycoon 2 has two official expansion packs: Wacky Worlds and Time Twister, both released in 2003 and had no involvement from Chris Sawyer, instead being handled by Frontier Developments. The Combo Park Pack edition contains the original game and the Wacky Worlds expansion. The Triple Thrill Pack contains the original game and both expansions.

In April 2014, an open-source project, known as OpenRCT2, was launched to enhance the gameplay of RollerCoaster Tycoon 2, including fixing bugs and allowing the game to run natively on macOS, Linux and modern Windows. The game is completely rewritten in the C++ programming language, but still relies on assets from the original game. OpenRCT2 reduces limitations in the original, and adds other completely new features such as multiplayer.

=== RollerCoaster Tycoon 3 ===
RollerCoaster Tycoon 3 was released on 2 November 2004, in North America. Although the core features of RollerCoaster Tycoon 3 are based on the previous games, Chris Sawyer, the developer of the first two games, acted only as a consultant. The game was developed by Frontier Developments instead, and published and advertised by Atari featuring a completely different structure.

Two expansion packs for RollerCoaster Tycoon 3 were released - Soaked! and Wild!. A bundle, RollerCoaster Tycoon 3 Gold, was also released, including the original game and the Soaked! expansion pack; this was followed by RollerCoaster Tycoon 3 Platinum (Deluxe for the EU version of the game), including both expansion packs and the original game. RollerCoaster Tycoon 3 Platinum was released for Microsoft Windows and MacOS X.

A remastered version of the game titled RollerCoaster Tycoon 3 Complete Edition, developed and published by Frontier Foundry, was released for Windows, macOS, and Nintendo Switch, featuring widescreen support and revamped controls to accommodate for Switch features.

=== RollerCoaster Tycoon World ===
RollerCoaster Tycoon World was developed by Nvizzio Creations for Atari, Inc. and RCTO Productions and released on 16 November 2016. The instalment is different from previous games in that players build coasters with a spline-based system. It also introduced a new "Architect mode" and "safety-rating" options when building coasters. The game is also the first to incorporate the Steam Workshop.

The game received largely negative reviews, both from critics and fans of the franchise, particularly compared to Planet Coaster, which was released the day after and received largely positive reviews.

=== RollerCoaster Tycoon Wonderworks ===
RollerCoaster Tycoon Wonderworks is an upcoming game developed by Springloaded Games. The game will be released for Windows in early access in late 2026, with plans for console ports later.

== Spinoffs ==
=== RollerCoaster Tycoon 3D ===
RollerCoaster Tycoon 3D was released on 16 October 2012. It was developed by n-Space for the Nintendo 3DS. While using many assets and engine content from Rollercoaster Tycoon 3, this game reverted to an isometric view and, due to the limitations of the Nintendo 3DS, removed features such as additional scenery and pools.

=== RollerCoaster Tycoon 4 Mobile ===
RollerCoaster Tycoon 4 Mobile was released on 10 April 2014. The game was initially available for iPhone, iPad and iPod touch devices. The game was later released for Android devices (OS 4.0.3 and higher) on 18 October 2014. The game was developed by On5 Games without Chris Sawyer's input (other than licensing). The game returns to the isometric view used in the first two games. The game is built on the freemium model with social media integration.

This installment was universally panned among fans and critics alike. It was criticized due to Chris Sawyer's absence in the making of the game and the heavy use of microtransactions and wait times.

=== RollerCoaster Tycoon 3: Mobile Edition ===
Released in August 2015, RollerCoaster Tycoon 3: Mobile Edition is an iOS version of RollerCoaster Tycoon 3 developed and published by Frontier and is a faithful port of the original game (tutorial mode, original 18 scenarios for career, and a sandbox).

=== RollerCoaster Tycoon Classic ===
On 22 December 2016, a modified port of both RollerCoaster Tycoon and RollerCoaster Tycoon 2 was released for iOS and Android, featuring a single price point for the majority of content from both of the original games. It also features three in-app purchases for Expansion Pack content, based on the two expansion packs from RollerCoaster Tycoon 2 and an editor pack that allows users to create custom scenarios. The following year, the game was ported to Windows and macOS, and would later see ports for the Nintendo Switch at the end of 2024, and the PlayStation 5, Xbox Series X, PlayStation 4, Xbox One, and Nintendo Switch 2 in 2026.

=== RollerCoaster Tycoon Touch ===
First released for iOS devices in December 2016, RollerCoaster Tycoon Touch is a free-to-play mobile port of RollerCoaster Tycoon World. Like RollerCoaster Tycoon 4, it contains in-app purchases and wait times, but expands upon the social media integration. An Android version was released in April 2017. In October 2017, items based on the Barbie brand were added to the game. On 28 January, items based on Shaun the Sheep were added to the game.

=== RollerCoaster Tycoon Joyride ===
An on-rails shooter based on the RollerCoaster Tycoon franchise, named RollerCoaster Tycoon Joyride, was released in 2018 for the PlayStation 4's PlayStation VR headset. The game was poorly received.

=== RollerCoaster Tycoon Adventures ===
In January 2018, Atari Game Partners announced it was seeking equity crowdfunding via the StartEngine platform in order to develop a new game in the series. Titled RollerCoaster Tycoon Adventures, it is an adaption of RollerCoaster Tycoon Touch and was released for the Nintendo Switch in Europe on 29 November 2018, and in North America on 13 December. The game was also released on Microsoft Windows via the Epic Games Store on 19 March 2019.

In 2023, Atari released an updated version with new content and features, titled RollerCoaster Tycoon Adventures Deluxe. Deluxe is available for PlayStation 4, PlayStation 5, Xbox Series X and Series S, and Nintendo Switch.

=== RollerCoaster Tycoon Puzzle ===
RollerCoaster Tycoon Puzzle (originally known as RollerCoaster Tycoon Story) is a free-to-play entry in the series developed by Graphite Lab. Atari released the game in January 2020 for iOS and Android mobile devices.

The free-to-play title is based on the tile-matching genre, in which the tiles to match move each turn on rollercoaster tracks within each level. Completing levels helps the player to restore a run-down theme park as part of the game's narrative.

== Gameplay ==
The first two games used this isometric viewpoint. Shown is X and Viper at Six Flags Magic Mountain in RollerCoaster Tycoon 2.

The player is given control over an amusement park and is tasked with reaching particular goals, such as improving the park's value, attracting more guests, or maintaining the park rating. Some scenarios in the game provide an empty plot of land and allow the player to build a park from scratch, while others provide a ready-built park which usually suffers from deterioration, bad planning, or underdevelopment. The player must wisely invest the limited amount of money provided.

Most scenarios require that the goals be achieved by a specific in-game date, or else the scenario is not "complete". Completion of scenarios is a prerequisite for unlocking further scenarios in the first RollerCoaster Tycoon game. In RollerCoaster Tycoon 2, all the scenarios are available for play and the player can complete them in any order they choose.

The player is responsible for building out the park such as modifying terrain, constructing footpaths, adding decorative elements, installing food/drink stalls and other facilities, and building rides and attractions. Many of the rides that can be built are roller coasters or variations on that, such as log flumes, water slides and go-kart tracks. The player can build these out with hills, drops, curves, and other "special" track pieces (such as loops, corkscrews and helixes), limited only by cost and the geography of the park and other nearby attractions. There are also stationary rides, such as Ferris wheels, merry-go-rounds, and bumper cars, most of which only contain single ride "piece" and are very limited in terms of variation. Rides are ranked on scales of excitement, intensity, and nausea, all which influence which park guests will ride those attractions and how they will behave afterward. The player can set the prices for park admission rides and guest amenities, although care must be taken so that guests will not think prices are too high. The player is also responsible for hiring park staff to maintain the rides, keep the park clean, enforce security, and entertain guests. Players may also invest in "research", which unlocks new rides and improvements as time goes on, though it costs money to continue research. Research in a particular category is disabled when all attractions in that category are researched.

The guests, who are integral to the gameplay, are treated as separate entities which can each have particular characteristics and be tracked by the player around the park. The game keeps track of how much money they have, what they are carrying, their thoughts, and what their current needs are (thirst, hunger, etc.). Each guest also has some unique features such as their preferred ride intensity, and their nausea tolerance. Some scenarios are even biased towards a specific guest demographic and require the player to take this into account in designing the park. In RollerCoaster Tycoon 3, the player can create their own guest groups to visit their parks.

Sequels have continually upgraded the number of rides and amount of customization available to the player.

== Legacy ==
Planet Coaster, which has been called a spiritual successor to RollerCoaster Tycoon 3, was developed and published by Frontier Developments for Microsoft Windows and was released worldwide on 17 November 2016. Frontier Developments had previously worked in the amusement park construction and management genre with the Xbox port of RollerCoaster Tycoon, RollerCoaster Tycoon 3, Thrillville, Thrillville: Off the Rails, and Zoo Tycoon.

Parkitect, released worldwide for Microsoft Windows, Mac OS X and Linux on 29 November 2018 after two years in early access, is similarly considered to be a spiritual successor to the first two RollerCoaster Tycoon games.

OpenRCT2 (2014) is a free and open-source re-implementation of RollerCoaster Tycoon 2 which adds some additional features and fixes numerous bugs.

Several user-created roller coasters with unusual or "sadist" designs received media attention after footage of them were posted on various imageboards and social media. In particular, a 2012 4chan thread describing a slow, ghostly train track attraction called "Mr. Bones' Wild Ride" – a ride lasting for four in-game years – became an Internet meme. The passengers are shown expressing "I want to get off Mr. Bones Wild Ride". At the ride's conclusion, the exit leads only to another boarding platform with a sign explaining that "the ride never ends". Both phrases have become popular memes.

RollerCoaster Tycoon has been cited as an inspiration of professionals working in the real-life rollercoaster industry.

World Wrestling Entertainment professional wrester John Cena stated during his appearance on the Joe Rogan Experience that he used to play Roller Coaster Tycoon on his laptop while traveling on the WWE bus.

== Other media ==
The franchise has also spawned a board game and a pinball machine by Stern, both released in 2002, and a series of gamebooks released in 2002 and 2003. In 2010, it was reported that Sony Pictures Animation had acquired the rights to develop a film adaptation of the series.
