= Beyblade: Super Tournament Battle =

2002 video game

- North American cover art showing Kai
- Developer: A.I.
- Publishers: JP: Takara; NA/EU: Atari Interactive
- Platform: GameCube
- Release: JP: December 19, 2002; NA: September 23, 2003; PAL: November 28, 2003
- Genre: Action role-playing
- Modes: Single-player, multiplayer

Beyblade: Super Tournament Battle (Note: , also known as Beyblade V-Force: Super Tournament Battle and Bakuten Shoot Beyblade 2002: Nettou! Magne-tag Battle! (爆転シュートベイブレード2002 熱闘！マグネタッグバトル！) in Japan) is a Beyblade 2002 role-playing video game. The game was released originally on December 19, 2002, in Japan and was later released in the west in 2003. It is based on the Beyblade V-Force season.

== Gameplay ==
In Beyblade: Super Tournament Battle, players participate in tournament-style matches where two spinning tops are launched into small stadiums to compete against one another. After a gauge charges, the player presses a button to set the top spinning, and the match begins as the tops collide within the arena. Battles revolve around the tops bumping into each other until one stops spinning or is forced out of the stadium. Players can also summon Bit Beasts—magical entities such as dragons or tornados—that appear mid-battle to strike the opponent's top. Customization options allow players to modify their Beyblades, with more than 150 possible part combinations available. Matches take place in small stadiums, and the core of the game consists of progressing through these tournament encounters using the tops and any equipped enhancements.

== Reception ==
Reception

Aggregate score
Aggregator	Score
Metacritic	32% (6 reviews)

Review scores
Publication	Score
Famitsu	5/10, 6/10, 6/10, 6/10
GameZone	5/10
IGN	2.5/10

IGN called Beyblade: Super Tournament Battle a travesty and only recommended it only true fans of the franchise.
