= RollerCoaster Tycoon 3D =

2012 video game

- Official North American cover art
- Developer: n-Space
- Publisher: Atari, Inc.
- Series: RollerCoaster Tycoon
- Platform: Nintendo 3DS
- Release: NA: October 16, 2012; EU: October 26, 2012; AU: October 26, 2012
- Genre: Construction and management simulation
- Mode: Single-player

RollerCoaster Tycoon 3D is a 2012 construction and management simulation game developed by n-Space and published by Atari, Inc. for the Nintendo 3DS. The game is a spin-off of the RollerCoaster Tycoon and its first portable game.

== Gameplay ==
The gameplay is similar and borrow elements from previous installments of RollerCoaster Tycoon, as players are able build roller coasters in a 3D space, construct various attractions, and generally various aspects of the park. The game also has features from the previous game such the CoasterCam and themed areas, but does not have other features such as water attractions, fireworks, and adjustable terrain.

== Reception ==
Reception

Aggregate score
Aggregator	Score
Metacritic	39/100

Review score
Publication	Score
Nintendo Power	5.5/10

RollerCoaster Tycoon 3D has received mostly negative reviews, with many critics citing that the game does not hold up to its predecessors due to its unappealing graphics, lack of mechanics from previous games, a poorly designed interface, and a generally dull experience. The game has a score of 39 out of 100 on Metacritic.
