= RollerCoaster Tycoon 2 =

2002 video game

- Publisher: Infogrames
- Designer: Chris Sawyer
- Programmer: Chris Sawyer
- Artist: Simon Foster
- Composer: Allister Brimble
- Series: RollerCoaster Tycoon
- Platform: Windows
- Release: NA: October 15, 2002; EU: October 18, 2002; AU: October 25, 2002
- Genre: Construction and management simulation
- Mode: Single-player

RollerCoaster Tycoon 2 is a 2002 construction and management simulation game developed by Chris Sawyer and published by Infogrames. Released for Windows as the sequel to RollerCoaster Tycoon, the game simulates the management of amusement parks.

The features and expansions were ported to RollerCoaster Tycoon Classic in 2017. OpenRCT2, an open-source game engine recreation, was first released in 2015.

== Gameplay ==
An in-game screenshot of RollerCoaster Tycoon 2 showing the user interface and some rides

In RollerCoaster Tycoon 2, players manage amusement parks and attempt to meet various goals to complete assigned scenarios. The game retains the isometric perspective of its predecessor, allowing for high compatibility with amusement parks made in the previous game. Various attractions, including transport rides, gentle rides, thrill rides, roller coasters, water rides, and shops or stalls, can be added to the parks as well as landscaping and decorations. The player satisfies park visitors' needs by building facilities and services such as food stalls, bathrooms, souvenir shops, ATMs, and information kiosks, as well as by hiring staff. The player must simultaneously balance the park's expenses and income.

One notable difference from RollerCoaster Tycoon is a more robust system for building structures, in which one can lay each piece of wall and roof individually. The game provides greater flexibility by allowing pieces of scenery, rides, and other structures to be placed at varying heights above and below ground. The mechanics in the predecessor made custom building construction less efficient, and rides and shops previously could not be built at varying elevations; in that game, only rides that had tracks could be built underground, since the first section of any ride had to be placed above ground. Many of the rides from the original RollerCoaster Tycoon have been modified and/or renamed. Some old ride designs have been merged with others.

User-created scenery items make a debut in this title. The 'bulldozer' allows the player to remove multiple pieces of scenery instead of only one piece at a time. A scenario editor is introduced, which allows players to create their own scenarios, creating the landscape, setting objectives, and selecting available rides and scenery. Players can make and test their own roller coasters to save them for use in other levels with the Roller Coaster Designer, and the game includes a licensed promotion by Six Flags to include their own content and scenarios based on five of their amusement park branches, including Magic Mountain, Great Adventure, and Over Texas. Walibi Holland and Walibi Belgium were also under the Six Flags brands during development and were also included. Many popular rides in Six Flags amusement parks can be used in other scenarios, but are locked from editing. The game also contains a variety of new themes and music for attractions. Guests' AI was improved from the original game, allowing for the creation of more complex paved areas.

All of the scenarios in RollerCoaster Tycoon 2 are available at first launch (which contrasts RollerCoaster Tycoon's unlocking system), and they are divided into five folder tabs: Beginner, Challenging, Expert, Real, and Other parks. The 'Real' tab contains the Six Flags parks preconstructed, while the 'Other' tab contains their empty versions. When creating a scenario, the player can save to any of the tabs. As with the previous game, players could upload their saved track designs onto the now-defunct 'Ride Exchange.' Track designs from both games can later be imported into RollerCoaster Tycoon 3, where they are no longer locked to the isometric views.

== Development ==
Screenshot of the OpenRCT2 open-source reimplementation, showing the user interface

RollerCoaster Tycoon 2 was developed by Chris Sawyer, who designed and programmed the game entirely by himself in x86 assembly language. Some parts of the game were based on efforts to develop a new version of Transport Tycoon, which Sawyer had been working on as early as 1996. The game was published by Infogrames and released on October 15, 2002.

== Release ==
=== Expansion packs ===
Much like with the first game, two expansion packs were released for Roller Coaster Tycoon 2, which included new rides, facilities, and scenarios. Each pack was based around themes and didn't have any involvement from the series' creator Chris Sawyer. Instead, both expansions were developed by Frontier Developments, who developed the Xbox port of the original game, and would go on to develop the entirety of RollerCoaster Tycoon 3 and its spiritual successor, Planet Coaster.

- The first pack, Wacky Worlds, was released in May 2003. This expansion focused on parks based in different countries around the world, including cultural heritage.
- The second pack, Time Twister, was released in November 2003. This expansion focused on parks based around different time periods.

=== Re-releases and compilations ===
In November 2003, to go alongside the release of Time Twister's, Atari released RollerCoaster Tycoon 2: Combo Park Pack, which was a boxed compilation of the base game and Wacky Worlds on separate discs. In Europe, this was known as RollerCoaster Tycoon 2: Gold Edition.

In October 2004, a second major compilation - RollerCoaster Tycoon 2: Triple Thrill Pack, was released, containing the base game and both expansions on a single disc. In Europe, this was known as RollerCoaster Tycoon 2: Deluxe Edition, however, this version was released on separate discs. Although later reissues would include a single disc.

The Triple Thrill Pack was later released on digital distribution platforms such as GOG.com and Steam. In July 2014, these versions were updated to include European language localizations, which were previously available as separate retail versions.

== Reception ==
RollerCoaster Tycoon 2

Aggregate scores
Aggregator	Score
GameRankings	76%
Metacritic	74/100

Review scores
Publication	Score
Computer Games Magazine	4/5
Computer Gaming World	3.5/5
Eurogamer	6/10
Game Informer	8.5/10
GameRevolution	7.5/10
GameSpot	7.0/10
GameSpy	3.5/5
IGN	8.4/10
PC Format	78%
PC Gamer (US)	80%
X-Play	3/5
APC	3.5/5

Dan Adams of IGN gave Roller Coaster Tycoon 2 an 8/10, praising the game for the addition of the scenario and ride editor, as well as worth in value. Brett Todd of GameSpot gave it a 7/10, praising the game's for the "more depth" audio and its new editors, but criticized the game for not addressing many of the issues of the first game. Greg Bemis of TechTV's X-Play praised the game for its improvements in customization but criticized the game for a lack of a sandbox mode. Martin Taylor of Eurogamer praised the game for its inclusion of scenarios based on actual Six Flags parks but criticized the game's outdated graphics, contrasting it to SimCity 4. Taylor also criticized the scenario editor for its outdated tools, preferring that it would have been given away for free for the first game.

A major criticism for RollerCoaster Tycoon 2 at the time of its release was that the game engine and interface were almost identical to the first game, with minor improvements in graphics, such as more images for coaster cars, allowing for smoother animations. Dana Jongewaard of Computer Gaming World suggested that the game needed "consistent back buttons for the interface" that would "save a lot of time that's spent closing and reopening windows" and stated that "a shift from 2D to 3D would have been a great way to showcase these new coasters."

RollerCoaster Tycoon 2 was a runner-up for GameSpot's 2002 "Most Disappointing Game on PC" award, which went to Civilization III: Play the World.

=== Sales ===
Before the release of RollerCoaster Tycoon 2, global sales of the RollerCoaster Tycoon series had surpassed 6 million units, including more than 4 million units in North America. This success led Dan Adams of IGN to call the sequel "basically a foregone conclusion". The series' combined sales—including those of RollerCoaster Tycoon 2, Wacky Worlds and Time Twister—rose to 7 million copies by April 2004. The NPD Group declared Rollercoaster Tycoon 2 the 10th-best-selling computer game of 2002, and the 12th-best-selling of 2003.

In the United States, RollerCoaster Tycoon 2 sold 940,000 copies and earned $21.6 million by August 2006. Edge ranked it as the country's eighth best-selling computer game released between January 2000 and August 2006, and as the country's best-selling RollerCoaster Tycoon game released in that period. RollerCoaster Tycoon 2 also received a "Gold" sales award from the Entertainment and Leisure Software Publishers Association (ELSPA), indicating sales of at least 200,000 copies in the United Kingdom.

== Legacy ==
RollerCoaster Tycoon 2 has been called the best game in the series by several publications.

Several user-created rollercoasters received media attention after footage of them were posted on various imageboards and social media.

The RollerCoaster Tycoon series spawned a popular Internet meme based on a series of posts made in 2012 on 4chan featuring a slow, 30,696 foot ghost train track ride made in RCT2 called "Mr. Bones' Wild Ride" that took four in-game years to complete, leading the passengers in the game to express "I want to get off Mr. Bones' Wild Ride". At the ride's conclusion, while the passengers were being guided back to the entrance to the ride, they were then greeted by a skeleton prop with a top hat, with a sign stating "The ride never ends". Both phrases have become popular memes.

Parkitect, a 2018 amusement park management game, has been compared to RollerCoaster Tycoon 2.

=== OpenRCT2 ===
In April 2014, an open-source software project, OpenRCT2, was launched to enhance the gameplay of RollerCoaster Tycoon 2, including fixing bugs and allowing the game to run natively on macOS and Linux. The project replicates RollerCoaster Tycoon 2's gameplay with alterations such as support for high-definition resolutions, the substantial raising of software limitations on parks, and improved pathfinding. The port features UI themes, fast forwarding, pausing, enhanced localization, OpenGL hardware rendering, additional cheat codes, autosaving, larger screenshots, and additional ride types.

The project began as a solo endeavour by the software developer Ted John, but has since had over 250 contributors improve the game. In order to create an accurate clone, the game was incrementally reverse engineered and re-written in the C++ programming language.
