= RollerCoaster Tycoon 4 Mobile =

2014 video game

- Developer: On5, UAB
- Publisher: Atari
- Series: RollerCoaster Tycoon
- Platforms: iOS, Android
- Release: iOS; 10 April 2014; Android; 22 October 2014
- Genre: Construction and management simulation
- Mode: Single-player

RollerCoaster Tycoon 4 Mobile is a defunct 2014 construction and management simulation video game, developed by On5, UAB and published by Atari. It is an installment in the RollerCoaster Tycoon, the second to be released for mobile devices, after Frontier Developments made a port of RollerCoaster Tycoon 3 for iOS. The original creator of the series, Chris Sawyer, had no involvement with the development. The game was initially released as payware, but has since become free-to-play.

== Gameplay ==
The person playing, the "Tycoon", was able to build and maintain rides such as carousels, bumper cars, roller coasters and a ferris wheel. The Tycoon was able to build food stands that sell ice cream, pizza, hot dogs, etc. to earn money for future builds. The ticketing booth, along with regular restaurants, a daycare center, and souvenir shop, among others, also provided money. Roller coasters could be either custom built or pre-built, made of wood, steel, titanium, or carbon and edited later.

Building a theme park in the game

The Tycoon had to constantly add and maintain attractions to attract "Peeps", the game's name for park guests. As rides broke down, Peeps started to leave and the park's Buzz level, the percentage of people that love the park, went down. Repairing rides raised the Buzz level and caused Peeps to return. Earning money and completing quests earned the Tycoon experience, money or tickets, rare tokens used for the same purposes as regular coins. Every time a quest was completed, a new quest would come up with a different reward. Leveling up earned money, tickets, and unlocked new attractions. On 9 January 2016, two new coasters, hanging and bobsled, were added along with the option to create new parks and build a big empire. People could also take part in a campaign mode similar to those of earlier games.

In October 2020, support for the game appeared to have been terminated as the game no longer loads for players. Users report being unable to access their saved gameplay or being able to get past the “game loading” screen.

As of July 2023, official support has been dropped accompanying the earlier server shut-down.

== Reception ==
Reviews

Aggregate score
| Aggregator | Score |
|---|---|
| Metacritic | 35/100 |

Review scores
| Publication | Score |
|---|---|
| Eurogamer | 1/10 |
| Gamezebo | 2.5/5 |
| TouchArcade | 2/5 |

On Metacritic, it has a score of 35 out of 100, from 13 critic reviews, indicating "generally unfavorable reviews". The game was criticised because of its micro-transactions, excessive wait timers and features removed from previous RollerCoaster Tycoon games. Chris Schilling for Eurogamer also criticised the music, calling it "irredeemably bad", giving the game a score of 1 out of 10. After the game became free instead of paid, reviews were more mixed - though reviewers still considered the game inferior to earlier entries in the series.
