= F1 Manager =

F1 Manager may refer to:

- F1 Manager (video game), a Microsoft Windows video game by EA Sports
- F1 Clash (originally known as F1 Manager), an iOS/Android video game by Hutch
- F1 Manager (video game series), a multiplatform video game series by Frontier Developments
  - F1 Manager 2022, a multiplatform video game by Frontier Developments
  - F1 Manager 2023, a multiplatform video game by Frontier Developments
  - F1 Manager 2024, a multiplatform video game by Frontier Developments
