= David Braben =

British video game developer, designer and CEO

David Braben OBE
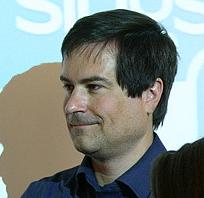
- Braben in 2005
- Born: David John Braben; 2 January 1964 (age 62); West Bridgford, Nottingham, UK
- Education: Jesus College, Cambridge
- Occupations: Business executive; video game developer and designer
- Years active: 1984–present
- Known for: Co-creator of the Elite series; Co-founder of the Raspberry Pi Foundation
- Title: Founder and President of Frontier Developments
- Spouses: Katharin Dickinson (m. 1993, divorced) Wendy Irvin-Braben (m. 2014)
- Children: 2

Signature
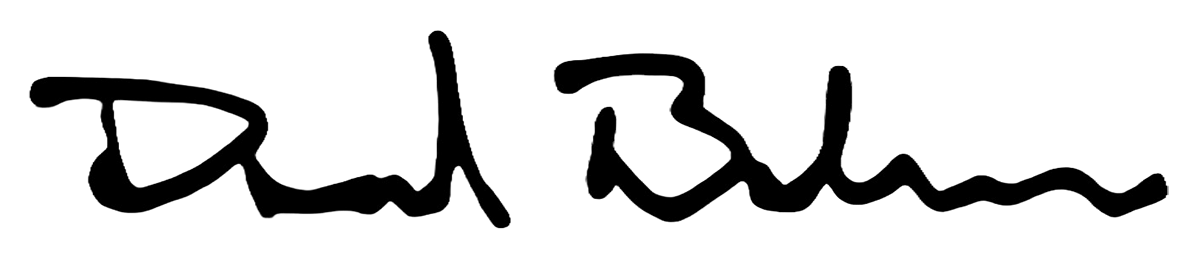

David John Braben (born 2 January 1964) is an English video game developer and designer, founder and President of Frontier Developments, and co-creator of the Elite series of space trading video games, first published in 1984. He is also a co-founder of and works as a trustee for the Raspberry Pi Foundation, which in 2012 launched a low-cost computer for education.

== Biography ==
=== Early life ===
Braben was born in West Bridgford, Nottingham. He attended Buckhurst Hill County High School in Chigwell, Essex. He studied Natural Sciences at Jesus College, Cambridge, specialising in Electrical Science in his final year.

=== Career ===
In 2008, Braben was an investor and non-executive director of Phonetic Arts, a speech generation company led by Paul Taylor. Phonetic Arts was acquired by Google in 2010, for an undisclosed sum.

In May 2011, Braben announced a new prototype computer intended to stimulate the teaching of basic computer science in schools. Called Raspberry Pi, the computer is mounted in a package the size of a credit card, has a USB port on one end with a HDMI monitor socket on the other, and provides an ARM processor running Linux for an estimated price of about £15 for a configured system, cheap enough to give to a child to do whatever he or she wants with it. The Raspberry Pi Foundation is a charity whose aim is to "promote the study of computer science and related topics, especially at school level, and to put the fun back into learning computing".

==== Game development ====
Braben has been called "one of the most influential computer game programmers of all time", based on his early game development with the Elite series in the 1980s and 1990s. Next Generation listed him in their "75 Most Important People in the Games Industry of 1995", chiefly due to the original Elite.

Elite was developed in conjunction with programmer Ian Bell while both were undergraduate students at Cambridge University. Elite was first released in September 1984 and is known as the first game to have 3D hidden-line removal. In 1987, Braben published Zarch for the Acorn Archimedes, ported in 1988 as Virus for the Atari ST, Amiga, and IBM PC compatibles.

After Zarch, Braben went on to develop the sequel to Elite, Frontier, published in 1993, and founded Frontier Developments, a games development company whose first project was a version of Frontier for the Amiga CD32. Braben is still the President and majority shareholder of the company, whose projects since 2000 have included Dog's Life, Kinectimals, RollerCoaster Tycoon 3, LostWinds, Planet Coaster, Elite: Dangerous, Jurassic World Evolution, Kinect Disneyland Adventures, Zoo Tycoon, Coaster Crazy, and games based on the Wallace & Gromit franchise.

In 2006, Braben was working on an ambitious next-generation game called The Outsider, being developed by Frontier Developments. As said in an interview, he was planning to start working on Elite 4 – as a space MMORPG game – as soon as The Outsider went gold. Braben said explicitly that this title was of special value to him. The Outsider was abandoned due to the removal of publisher support and was never published.

In 2012, Braben explained in an interview with developer website Gamasutra his opinion that the sale of secondhand games negatively affects the development of new titles, also holding the price of games in general much higher than they would otherwise be. However, later in 2014 he acknowledged: "Piracy goes hand in hand with sales. If a game is pirated a lot, it will be bought a lot. People want a connected experience, so with pirated games we still have a route in to get them to upgrade to the real version. And even if someone's version is pirated, they might evangelise and their mates will buy the real thing."

On 6 November 2012, Braben's Frontier Developments announced a new Elite sequel called Elite: Dangerous on the Kickstarter crowdfunding site. Elite: Dangerous achieved its funding goal and was listed as one of the most funded Kickstarter campaigns. The game was released on 16 December 2014, and by April 2015 had sold over 500,000 copies. As of August 2017, the game has sold over 2.75 million copies.

In August 2022, Frontier announced David's transition to his new role of President and Founder, stepping down as CEO.

== Personal life ==
In May 1993, he married Katharin Dickinson in Cambridge. His current wife is Wendy Irvin-Braben, and he has two sons. According to the Sunday Times Rich List in 2020, Braben and his wife have an estimated combined worth of £182 million, an increase of £50 million from the previous year.

== Awards ==
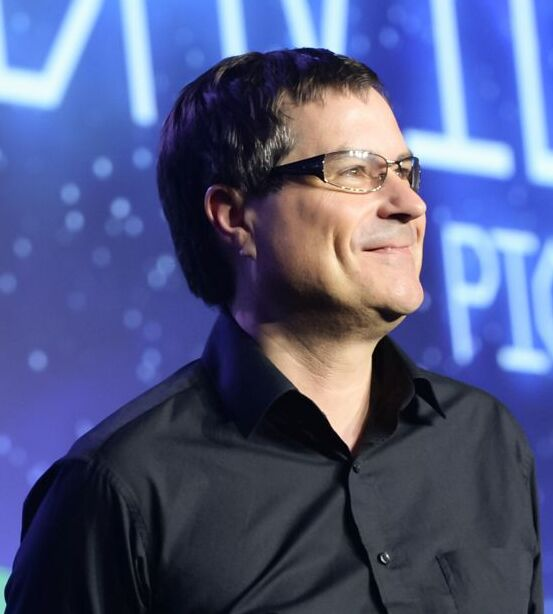
Braben receiving the Pioneer Award at the Game Developers Choice Awards in 2015

On 5 September 2005, Braben received the Development Legend Award at the Develop Industry Excellence Awards in Cambridge.

In 2012, Braben was elected as a Fellow of the Royal Academy of Engineering.

In 2013, Braben was co-award winner of Tech Personality of the Year at the UK Tech Awards 2013. In the same year, he was awarded an honorary degree by Abertay University.

Braben was appointed Officer of the Order of the British Empire (OBE) in the 2014 Birthday Honours for services to the UK computer and video games industry.

In January 2015, he received the 2015 Pioneer, Game Developers Choice Award (GDCA), for his work on the Raspberry Pi and for working more than 30 years as a game developer.

On 12 March 2015, Braben was awarded the BAFTA Academy Fellowship Award in video gaming at the 11th British Academy Games Awards.

Braben is the recipient of three honorary doctorates from Abertay University (2013), the Open University (2014), and the University of York (15 July 2015).

Braben was inducted into the UK Games Industry Hall of Fame on 4 March 2025.

== Games ==
Game name	First released	Braben's role(s)
Elite	1984	Designer and programmer
Zarch	1987	Developer
Conqueror	1990	Developer
Campaign	1992	Programmer (original 3D shape display code)
Frontier: Elite II	1993	Designer, writer and programmer
Frontier: First Encounters	1995	Director and writer
Darxide	1995	Designer
V2000	1998	Programmer
Infestation	2000	Creative director and engine and tool programmer
Dog's Life	2003	Director and designer
RollerCoaster Tycoon 3	2004	Executive producer
RollerCoaster Tycoon 3: Soaked!	2005	Executive producer
RollerCoaster Tycoon 3: Wild!	2005	Executive producer
Wallace & Gromit: The Curse of the Were-Rabbit	2005	Executive producer
Thrillville	2006	Executive producer
Thrillville: Off the Rails	2007	Executive producer
LostWinds	2008	Executive producer
LostWinds 2: Winter of the Melodias	2009	Chairman
Kinectimals	2010	Executive producer
Kinect Star Wars	2012	Chairman and Founder
Tales From Deep Space	2014	CEO and Founder
Elite: Dangerous	2014	Director
Planet Coaster	2016	CEO and Founder
Jurassic World Evolution	2018	CEO and Founder
