= 1st British Academy Games Awards =

Game award ceremony in 2004

- Date: February 2004
- Location: Radisson Portman Hotel, London
- Hosted by: Bill Bailey
- Best Game: Call of Duty
- Most awards: Grand Theft Auto: Vice City (6)
- Most nominations: Grand Theft Auto: Vice City (8)
- Website: https://www.bafta.org/awards/games?award-year=2004

The 1st British Academy Video Games Awards, awarded by the British Academy of Film and Television Arts, was an award ceremony held in February 2004 at the Radisson Portman Hotel in London. Hosted by Bill Bailey, the ceremony honoured achievement in 2003. Grand Theft Auto: Vice City was the major winner on the night, taking six out of the eight awards available.

== Winners and nominees ==
Winners are shown first in bold.

**Action Game**: **Grand Theft Auto: Vice City – Rockstar North/Rockstar Games**; Amplitude – Harmonix/Sony Computer Entertainment; EyeToy: Play – London Studio/Sony Computer Entertainment; Metroid Prime – Retro Studios and Nintendo/Nintendo; Mortal Kombat: Deadly Alliance – Midway Games/Midway Games; Ratchet & Clank – Insomniac Games/Sony Computer Entertainment	**Original Music**: **Harry Potter and the Chamber of Secrets – Argonaut/Electronic Arts**; Command & Conquer: Generals – Bill Brown and Mikael Sandgren, EA Pacific/EA Games; Primal – Paul Arnold, Andrew Barnabas and 16Volt, SCE Studio Cambridge/Sony Computer Entertainment; Republic: The Revolution – Elixir Studios/Eidos Interactive; Return to Castle Wolfenstein – Bill Brown, Gray Matter Studios/Activision; TimeSplitters 2 – Graeme Norgate, Free Radical Design/Eidos Interactive
**Adventure Game**: **The Legend of Zelda: The Wind Waker – Nintendo EAD/Nintendo**; 007: Nightfire – Eurocom/Electronic Arts; Broken Sword: The Sleeping Dragon – Revolution Software/The Adventure Company; Dark Chronicle – Level-5/Sony Computer Entertainment; Dog's Life – Frontier Developments/Sony Computer Entertainment; Jak II – Naughty Dog/Sony Computer Entertainment	**PC**: **Grand Theft Auto: Vice City – Rockstar North/Rockstar Games**; Broken Sword: The Sleeping Dragon – Revolution Software/The Adventure Company; Call of Duty – Infinity Ward/Activision; Halo: Combat Evolved – Bungie/Microsoft Game Studios; Medal of Honor: Allied Assault – 2015/EA Games; Rise of Nations – Big Huge Games/Microsoft Game Studios
**Animation or Intro**: **Soulcalibur II – Project Soul/Namco**; Big Mutha Truckers – Eutechnyx/Empire Interactive; Grand Theft Auto: Vice City – Rockstar North/Rockstar Games; Primal – SCE Studio Cambridge/Sony Computer Entertainment; Tekken 4 – Namco/Namco; Viewtiful Joe – Capcom	**PS2**: **Grand Theft Auto: Vice City – Rockstar North/Rockstar Games**; Amplitude – Harmonix/Sony Computer Entertainment; EyeToy: Play – London Studio/Sony Computer Entertainment; Ghosthunter – SCE Studio Cambridge/Sony Computer Entertainment Europe; Jak II – Naughty Dog/Sony Computer Entertainment; TimeSplitters 2 – Free Radical Design/Eidos Interactive
**Children's Game**: **EyeToy: Play – London Studio/Sony Computer Entertainment**; Disney Sports Soccer – Konami/Konami; Dog's Life – Frontier Developments/Sony Computer Entertainment; Pokémon Ruby and Sapphire – Game Freak/The Pokémon Company; Sly Cooper and the Thievius Raccoonus – Sucker Punch Productions/Sony Computer Entertainment; Wallace & Gromit in Project Zoo – Frontier Developments/BAM! Entertainment	**Racing**: **Project Gotham Racing 2 – Bizarre Creations/Microsoft Game Studios**; Burnout 2: Point of Impact – Criterion Games/Acclaim Entertainment; Formula One 2003 – Studio Liverpool/Sony Computer Entertainment Europe; MotoGP 2 – Climax Brighton/THQ; Need for Speed: Underground – EA Black Box/Electronic Arts; WRC II Extreme – Evolution Studios/Sony Computer Entertainment Europe
**Design**: **Grand Theft Auto: Vice City – Rockstar North/Rockstar Games**; Broken Sword: The Sleeping Dragon – Revolution Software/The Adventure Company; EyeToy: Play – London Studio/Sony Computer Entertainment; Jak II – Naughty Dog/Sony Computer Entertainment; Soulcalibur II – Project Soul/Namco; Viewtiful Joe – Capcom	**Sound**: **Grand Theft Auto: Vice City – Rockstar North/Rockstar Games**; Amplitude – Harmonix/Sony Computer Entertainment; Command & Conquer: Generals – EA Pacific/EA Games; Harry Potter and the Chamber of Secrets –; Metroid Prime – Retro Studios and Nintendo/Nintendo; TimeSplitters 2 – Free Radical Design/Eidos Interactive
**Game Boy Advance Game**: **Advance Wars 2: Black Hole Rising – Intelligent Systems/Nintendo**; Finding Nemo – Vicarious Visions/THQ; Golden Sun: The Lost Age – Camelot Software Planning/Nintendo; Pokémon Ruby and Sapphire – Game Freak/The Pokémon Company; Super Mario Advance 4: Super Mario Bros. 3 – Nintendo EAD/Nintendo; WarioWare, Inc.: Mega Microgames! – Nintendo R&D1/Nintendo	**Sports**: **FIFA Football 2004 – EA Canada/Electronic Arts**; F1 Career Challenge – Image Space Incorporated and Visual Science/EA Sports; Formula One 2003 – Studio Liverpool/Sony Computer Entertainment Europe; Tony Hawk's Underground – Neversoft/Activision; WWE SmackDown! Here Comes the Pain – Yuke's/THQ; WWE WrestleMania XIX – Yuke's/THQ
**Game on Any Platform – The Year's Best Game**: **Call of Duty – Infinity Ward/Activision**	**Strategy**: **Advance Wars 2: Black Hole Rising – Intelligent Systems/Nintendo**; Call of Duty – Infinity Ward/Activision; Command & Conquer: Generals – EA Pacific/EA Games; Rise of Nations – Big Huge Games/Microsoft Game Studios; Uru: Ages Beyond Myst – Cyan Worlds/Ubisoft; Worms 3D – Team17/Acclaim Entertainment
**GameCube**: **Metroid Prime – Retro Studios and Nintendo/Nintendo**; Billy Hatcher and the Giant Egg – Sonic Team/Sega; Soulcalibur II – Project Soul/Namco; The Legend of Zelda: The Wind Waker – Nintendo EAD/Nintendo; TimeSplitters 2 – Free Radical Design/Eidos Interactive; Viewtiful Joe – Capcom	**Sunday Times Reader Award for Games**: **Grand Theft Auto: Vice City – Rockstar North/Rockstar Games**; Call of Duty – Infinity Ward/Activision; Conflict: Desert Storm II – Pivotal Games and SCi/Gotham Games; Judge Dredd: Dredd vs. Death – Rebellion Developments/BAM! Entertainment; Star Wars: Knights of the Old Republic – BioWare/LucasArts; The Legend of Zelda: The Wind Waker – Nintendo EAD/Nintendo
**Mobile Game**: **Tony Hawk's Pro Skater – Neversoft/Activision**; FIFA Football 2004 – EA Canada/Electronic Arts; Hello Kitty – Sanrio/Sanrio; Ministry of Sound Dance Nation – Cybiko, Inc./THQ Wireless; Super Yum Yum – AirPlay/Indiagames; Weakest Link – Traveller's Tales/Activision	**Technical Achievement**: **EyeToy: Play – London Studio/Sony Computer Entertainment**; Grand Theft Auto: Vice City – Rockstar North/Rockstar Games; Medieval: Total War – The Creative Assembly/Activision; The Getaway – Team Soho/Sony Computer Entertainment; The Legend of Zelda: The Wind Waker – Nintendo EAD/Nintendo; True Crime: Streets of LA – Luxoflux/Activision
**Multiplayer**: **Battlefield 1942 – Digital Illusions CE/Electronic Arts**; EyeToy: Play – London Studio/Sony Computer Entertainment; MotoGP 2 – Climax Brighton/THQ; Neverwinter Nights: Hordes of the Underdark – BioWare/Atari; Project Gotham Racing 2 – Bizarre Creations/Microsoft Game Studios; Wolfenstein: Enemy Territory – Splash Damage/Activision	**Xbox**: **Star Wars: Knights of the Old Republic – BioWare/LucasArts**; Project Gotham Racing 2 – Bizarre Creations/Microsoft Game Studios; Soulcalibur II – Project Soul/Namco; The Lord of the Rings: The Return of the King – EA Redwood Shores/Electronic Arts; TimeSplitters 2 – Free Radical Design/Eidos Interactive; Top Spin – PAM Development/Microsoft Game Studios

=== Special Award ===
- **Chris Deering**

=== Games with multiple nominations and wins ===
==== Nominations ====
Nominations	Game
8	Grand Theft Auto: Vice City
6	EyeToy: Play
5	TimeSplitters 2
4	Soulcalibur II
4	The Legend of Zelda: The Wind Waker
3	Amplitude
3	Broken Sword: The Sleeping Dragon
3	Call of Duty
3	Command & Conquer: Generals
3	Jak II
3	Metroid Prime
3	Project Gotham Racing 2
3	Viewtiful Joe
2	Advance Wars 2: Black Hole Rising
2	Dog's Life
2	FIFA Football 2004
2	Formula One 2003
2	Harry Potter and the Chamber of Secrets
2	MotoGP 2
2	Pokémon Ruby and Sapphire
2	Primal
2	Rise of Nations
2	Star Wars: Knights of the Old Republic

==== Wins ====
Awards	Game
6	Grand Theft Auto: Vice City
2	Advance Wars 2: Black Hole Rising
2	EyeToy: Play
