= Zarch =

1987 computer game

- Archimedes cover art
- Developer: David Braben
- Publishers: Superior; Acornsoft, Firebird
- Designer: David Braben
- Programmers: David Braben (Archimedes, Amiga, ST); Chris Sawyer (MS-DOS); Steven Dunn (Spectrum)
- Platforms: Archimedes, Amiga, Atari ST, MS-DOS, ZX Spectrum
- Release: EU: 1987
- Genre: Third-person shooter
- Mode: Single-player

Zarch (also released as Virus) is a 3D video game developed by David Braben in 1987 for the launch of the Acorn Archimedes computer. Zarch started off as a demo called Lander which was bundled with almost every release of the Acorn Archimedes.

In 1988, ports of Zarch, renamed Virus, were published for the Atari ST and Amiga (coded by David Braben) and IBM PC (coded by Chris Sawyer). It was later ported to the ZX Spectrum by Steven Dunn.

The game was groundbreaking for the time, featuring a 3D mouse-controlled craft (the "lander") flying over a tile-rendered landscape that dazzled reviewers in a primarily 2D-dominated game industry. ACE (Advanced Computer Entertainment) magazine led with the headline "SOLID 3D - the future of games?" when it reviewed Zarch with a score of 979, the highest rating ACE had given at that time, only bettered by the Atari ST port Virus at 981.

Virus was one of the first solid 3D games and was also the earliest to have 3D lighting effects and shadowing, although they were less sophisticated than those of Zarch.

== Gameplay ==
The lander flies high in the atmosphere, shooting at an enemy Seeder which is infecting the ground, turning it red.

Zarch is a notoriously difficult game for beginners. Controls are extremely sensitive. Simply moving the mouse while taking off can cause the lander to explode on the launchpad.

The lander has one thruster pointing downwards beneath it. Firing the thruster makes the lander fly upwards. The lander has a flight ceiling above which the thruster will not fire. Flying in any direction requires the lander to be tilted in that direction. The lander can pitch and yaw, but cannot roll. Too much tilt can make the lander turn upside-down and cause the player to crash by accidentally thrusting downwards. The lander, although agile, is vulnerable, and can be destroyed by a single shot. The lander also expends fuel and must occasionally return to the launchpad to refuel. The lander must be level to the land. While refueling, the lander is vulnerable to attacks.

Every round fired costs one point, and the lander is equipped with a rapid-fire autocannon. This makes it possible to achieve a negative final score if nothing is actually hit.

No power-ups are available in the game, although the player has a limited number of smart missiles, and smart bombs and is awarded a new one of each when an extra life is earned. Some enemies are agile enough to outmanoeuvre the missiles, and the smart bombs have a very limited range.

== Plot ==
The plot is reminiscent of the arcade game Defender, in that the player, piloting a lone craft with limited firepower, must defend a finite landscape against ever-increasing waves of enemy craft. In Zarch, the landscape is being invaded by aliens that are spreading a virus across the landscape. The Seeder vessels are slow-moving, predictable, and easily destroyed, but as the game progresses, they are supported by increasing numbers of flying support craft. These crafts do not scatter the virus, but instead attack the player.

The Seeder vessels scatter red virus particles across the landscape. As they land, they turn the green landscape to brown and red, and cause the trees to mutate. Some flying enemies shoot the mutated trees, to cause themselves to become much more aggressive and dangerous. To clear each attack wave, the player must destroy all enemy vessels.

At the conclusion of each attack wave, the player is awarded bonus points for the amount of landscape which remains uninfected. After four attack waves have been successfully repelled, the player is awarded a new landscape, but there is comparatively less land and more water, making complete infection more likely.

=== Radar screen ===
In the top left is a "radar screen", which provides a map of the whole landscape as well as the position of the lander and enemy craft. Uninfected territory appears green, while infected territory appears red. The radar detection is provided by rotating scanning-towers which are evenly spaced across the landscape. Accidental destruction of these results in loss of detection in that area, and black squares appear on the map.

=== Notable enemies ===
In some levels, a fish-like enemy can be seen patrolling randomly on the water. It does not directly threaten the player, nor is its destruction required to complete the level. It also does not appear on the radar screen. When destroyed, it emits a puff of virus particles, and bonus points are awarded.

In advanced levels, a high-altitude, fast-moving bomber craft appears, dropping packets of virus particles in profusion. This craft is difficult to destroy, since the angle needed for the lander to match its speed is such that the cannon cannot easily be aimed. Meanwhile, it delivers huge amounts of virus particles to the landscape.

== Development ==
Lander demo

Braben had access to an Acorn A500 development machine for two weeks in January 1987. He was working on 3D landscape algorithms on the BBC Micro and then wrote Lander using ARM code.

=== Lander ===
Lander was a demo version of Zarch bundled with new Acorn Archimedes computers. It was completed in less than three months as an illustration of their capabilities. Although the graphical environment, controls and handling of the lander were similar to the released version, neither enemies nor virus were present on the landscape. Points were awarded for destroying trees and buildings.

While the lander was stationary on the launchpad, moving the mouse (which would normally tilt the attitude of the craft) would cause it to immediately explode. This was fixed in Virus: the craft would not explode while sitting on the launchpad, but only if a landing was attempted while the craft was not level.

=== Game engine ===
The player flies the lander over an undulating landscape of square tiles. The landscape routine uses fixed tile sizes, meaning that the depth of view (amount of terrain being rendered) directly influences the frame rate. During development, a greater depth of view reduced the frame rate to only one or two per second. Bank switching is used, with the display being in 256-color Mode 13. The higher resolution Mode 15 was not used because that leaves less available memory and the required VIDC bandwidth also slows down the processor.

Depth sorting uses bin sorting because objects only need to be approximately in order. The buffering demands memory, but does not have the same time overheads as bubble sorting or quicksort. Colour keying is implemented by varying levels of white according to depth.

Trees, buildings and enemies are drawn in filled light-sourced polygons. Shadows of the lander and enemies are projected vertically onto the ground, which does not cater for landscape curvature, but is fast. Consequently, shadows are not shown on other scenery. The shadows allow the player to follow movements of enemy craft by their shadows, even when they are not visible on the screen. In Virus, there is no light-sourcing. The game also provides particle system effects to depict the thrust from the lander, explosions, the virus spreading over the landscape, and other phenomena such as splashes when shots hit water, and puffs of dust when they strike land. At altitude, when the ground cannot be seen, dust particles in the air give the impression of movement and speed.

Four major routines are used in the game's programming:

- Animate object (nasties, player, missiles)
- General particle (bullets, debris, parachutes, spray)
- Landscape
- Scenery (trees, houses, radar).

The hillside landscape is generated from a number of pseudorandom sequence sine waves.

== Legacy ==
Reception

Awards
Publication	Award
Sinclair User	SU Classic
Your Sinclair	Megagame

The game was voted the 5th best game of all time in a 1991 issue of Amiga Power.

=== Follow up ===
The follow up to Zarch was a game using the same landscape engine, called Conqueror. In this game, the player controls a tank, and fights enemy tanks in a realistic manner. It was coded by Jonathan Griffiths and released on the Archimedes, PC, Atari ST and Amiga.

=== V2000 ===
In 1998, ten years after Zarch was released, a sequel, V2000 (also known as Virus 2000), was released for Windows and PlayStation. It was developed by David Braben and his company Frontier Developments, who tried to make the controls similar to, but more forgiving than those of the first game.

== See also ==
- Lunar Lander, arcade game
- Gravitar, arcade game
- Thrust
