= Warhammer 40,000: Chaos Gate – Daemonhunters =

- Developer: Complex Games
- Publisher: Frontier Foundry
- Series: Warhammer 40,000
- Platforms: Windows; PlayStation 4; PlayStation 5; Xbox One; Xbox Series X/S
- Release: Windows; 5 May 2022; PlayStation 4, PlayStation 5, Xbox One, Xbox Series X/S; 20 February 2024
- Genres: Turn-based strategy, tactical role-playing
- Mode: Single player

Warhammer 40,000: Chaos Gate – Daemonhunters is a turn-based tactics game set in the Games Workshop's Gothic science fiction Warhammer 40,000 fictional universe. It was developed by Complex Games and was published by Frontier Foundry. The game was released on Windows on 5 May 2022, with PlayStation 4, PlayStation 5, Xbox One and Xbox Series X/S versions available on 20 February 2024.

== Plot ==
The Grey Knights are a secret order of the Imperium of Man. They are a chapter of Adeptus Astartes (Space Marines) composed of psychics created by the Emperor of Mankind and Malcador the Sigilite for the purpose of combating the daemonic forces of chaos.

In the game's prologue, Captain Agravain of the Grey Knight Strike Force, Xiphos, battles on the fallen planet of Gaheris against a Khornate warhost, led by the Bloodthirster, Ere'khul. Agravain manages to banish Ere'khul, but he and most of his squad die in the process. Ectar, a Grey Knight Purifier aboard the strike cruiser, the Baleful Edict as part of punishment detail for reckless actions in a previous mission appoints one of the survivors of the campaign as the strike force's new commander. Ectar and the Adeptus Mechanicus Dominus, Lunete, travel to their home base of Titan (one of Saturn's moons) for debriefing and repairs when they are intercepted by Inquisitor Kartha Vakir of the Ordo Malleus. Coming aboard their ship, the inquisitor requests their service to aid in her investigation of a sector-wide plague known as "The Bloom".

Their investigations lead them to an Aeldari Craftworld that has long been lost to the corrupting influence of Nurgle, the Chaos God of Disease and Decay. Vakir accompanies the squad of Grey Knights to the Craftworld's infinity circuit chamber, and a dormant Avatar of Khaine explains to her that The Bloom is being spread by five Champions of Nurgle known as the "Reapers". The Reapers intend to spread the Bloom until the entire sector is infected, and thus allowing a being known as the "Morbus" to be summoned. As Vakir tries to obtain a sample of a bloom seed, she and the squad are attacked by Death Guard traitor astartes, led by a Daemon-Prince of Nurgle called Kadex Ilkarion (said Daemon-Prince had once been encountered by Vakir and was successfully banished many years ago).

During the battle, the Supreme Grandmaster of the Grey Knights, Kaldor Draigo, appears and manages to fend off the Death Guard whilst Vakir and the squad escape to their ship. Vakir proposes to hunt down the five reapers and trap their essences in a book known as the Codex Toxicus and save the sector. After dealing with three of the five reapers, Kadex Ilkarion attacks their ship and manages to destroy the Codex Toxicus before being captured. Vakir scries Kadex's mind for a way to locate the remaining Reapers and stop the bloom, but discovers to her horror that defeating the Reapers is not enough. The Bloom's roots are connected to the Garden of Nurgle, located within the Realm of Chaos itself. Kadex gloats that the bloom cannot be stopped, but when he mentions Kaldor Draigo, Vakir believes that Draigo and his sword, forged by the Emperor himself, can destroy the roots and finally put an end to the Bloom.

Kaldor Draigo has been cursed to wander the Realm of Chaos for centuries, and can only return to real-space for a short period of time before returning to the Warp. The Baleful Edict travels to a planet with a high level of warp energies, and Vakir manages to summon Draigo to inform him of their plans. As Draigo heads to the Garden of Nurgle, Vakir once again enters Kadex's mind and discovers that Kadex had tricked them into luring Draigo into a trap. Kadex's master, the Daemon-Primarch of the Death Guard, Mortarion, intends to ambush Draigo and take his vengeance upon him for the events that happened on the planet of Kornovin (where Draigo had carved the name of his slain master on Mortarion's heart before banishing him back to the Warp). It is revealed Mortarion is the Morbus, and he intends to use the sector as a base to launch an assault on the Grey Knights.

Enraged by this deception, Ectar almost slays Vakir before he is stopped by Lunete. Vakir claims that they can still save Draigo from Mortarion's trap by going to the Garden of Nurgle itself. Vakir proposes to infuse Kadex with a psychic beacon before slaying the Daemon-Prince, and following his returning spirit to the Garden. Before Vakir finishes her spell, she reveals that she has sacrificed her soul to Kadex so that she can act as the beacon. Once the spell is finished, Kadex's soul returns to his master, with the Grey Knights following suit.

The Grey Knights follow Kadex's soul to the Garden and manage to reinforce Draigo. As the Grey Knights battle Mortarion and his minions, Draigo cuts all five of the Bloom's roots. Once the final root has been severed, Mortarion flees. The Baleful Edict returns to real-space whilst the Grey Knights who fought Mortarion remain in the warp to accompany their Supreme Grandmaster. Ectar and Lunete return to Titan, where Ectar, impressed by Vakir's loyalty and bravery, recommends she has a memorial made for her.

After the End-Credits, a skull that contains Kadex's soul is shown. Kadex has managed to capture Vakir's soul, and declares that he will use her to further his future plans.

== Gameplay ==
The player commands a squad of Grey Knights in a fight against the forces of Nurgle who are attempting to release a plague on the galaxy called the Bloom.

== Development and release ==
The game is a sequel to the 1998 game Warhammer 40,000: Chaos Gate and was released 5 May 2022. The game was developed by Canadian studio Complex Games and was published by Frontier Foundry.

== Reception ==
Reception

Aggregate score
Aggregator	Score
Metacritic	81/100

Review scores
Publication	Score
Eurogamer	Recommended
IGN	8/10
PC Gamer (UK)	87/100
PCGamesN	8/10

Warhammer 40,000: Chaos Gate – Daemonhunters received "generally favorable" reviews, according to review aggregator Metacritic.

During the 26th Annual D.I.C.E. Awards, the Academy of Interactive Arts & Sciences nominated Chaos Gate – Daemonhunters for "Strategy/Simulation Game of the Year".

== Sequel ==
A sequel, titled Warhammer 40,000: Chaos Gate – Deathwatch, was announced.
