= F1 Manager (video game) =

2000 video game

- Developer(s): Intelligent Games
- Publisher(s): EA Sports
- Series: F1
- Platform(s): Microsoft Windows
- Release: EU: 6 October 2000
- Genre(s): Sports
- Mode(s): Single-player

F1 Manager is a sports video game developed by Intelligent Games and published by EA Sports exclusively for Microsoft Windows. It was the last officially licensed F1 Management game until F1 Manager 2022 by Frontier Developments.

The game takes place from the 1999 Formula One World Championship on. The player assumes the role as the team principal of a Formula One constructor managing and negotiating various aspects of the team. Critical reviews of the game were mixed.

== Gameplay ==
The player takes control of the management of a Formula One motor racing team from the 1999 Formula One World Championship over a period of ten years. They have the ability to select from a range of eleven teams composed of two racing drivers each and one test driver. There is also a chief designer, technical director and a commercial director to assist the player in managing a team. They are hired through contract negotiation and remain at the team until the conclusion of the season. Contracts are done on a first come, first served basis.

Throughout the game, the performance of the player is assessed by the chairperson of the board of directors, who provides them with objectives such as to win both the World Drivers' Championship and the World Constructors' Championship or to finish in a certain position in the latter championship that they are required to meet by the conclusion of a season. They can hire support staff to help assist in the functions of the team. Designers can be employed to construct components for the cars, engineers assist in the maintenance and creation of spare parts and commercial assistants work alongside sponsors to maintain their interest in the team. Players have the option to opt in or out of scheduled test day sessions to develop a car.

A news screen is included in the game to allow the player to read on developments concerning Formula One teams. During a race weekend, the player has the ability to order a driver how to drive during a Grand Prix and can change their pit stop strategies. They can be instructed to increase their overall speed, be asked to slow or maintain their position. Drivers also provide the player with feedback about the performance of their vehicle, which can be altered it to suit a particular racing circuit, and can report mechanical problems to the player.

The player may also elect to observe a race on a television screen platform that allows them to select their preferred camera angle, and provides information such as fuel loads and tyre wear to them. They are given the option to accelerate time to lessen the amount of real-world time it takes to complete a session. Rain is not featured in the game.

== Production ==
F1 Manager was developed by Intelligent Games in the United Kingdom, and was released worldwide on Microsoft Windows by the game's license holder EA Sports in October 2000. Commentary is provided by the ITV commentator Jim Rosenthal in English, and Kai Ebel in German.

== Reception ==
Jeuxvideo.com was complimentary towards the game's graphics and was critical of its soundtrack of which the reviewer deemed had no originality. They also said that the level of difficulty is not adjustable according to player's skill in management. Paul Presley of PC Zone felt that the most problematic aspect of the game was not making a difference in it and noted the races continue for a short while after the first car has completed a race. He however concluded that F1 Manager was better in terms of playability than Grand Prix Manager. A reviewer for the French magazine Joystick felt the user-friendliness and aesthetics of the game would make it more endearing to the public than Grand Prix Manager, and was less complimentary on its graphical and sound bugs. Nathan Quinn of The Race wrote that the game "killed off" the racing subgenre of management games for a long time.
