= Deliver Us the Moon =

2018 video game

- Developer: KeokeN Interactive
- Publisher: Wired Productions (Note: Deliver Us the Moon: Fortuna was self-published by KeokeN Interactive)
- Series: Deliver Us Serie
- Engine: Unreal Engine 4
- Platforms: Microsoft Windows; PlayStation 4; Xbox One; Google Stadia; PlayStation 5; Xbox Series X/S; Nintendo Switch
- Release: Windows: WW: September 28, 2018; WW: October 10, 2019; (re-release); PlayStation 4, Xbox One: WW: April 24, 2020; Stadia: WW: June 1, 2022; PlayStation 5, Xbox Series X/S: WW: June 23, 2022; Nintendo Switch: WW: July 16, 2024
- Genres: Puzzle, adventure
- Mode: Single-player

Deliver Us the Moon is an adventure-puzzle video game developed by Dutch game development studio KeokeN Interactive. It was first self-published as Deliver Us the Moon: Fortuna for Windows on September 28, 2018. The game later saw an expanded release on October 10, 2019, with Wired Productions serving as the publisher for the PlayStation 4 and Xbox One versions on April 24, 2020. The game was released for Google Stadia on June 1, 2022, for PlayStation 5 and Xbox Series X/S on June 23, 2022, and for Nintendo Switch on July 16, 2024.

Deliver Us the Moon was marketed as a science fiction thriller set in an apocalyptic near future; the game follows a lone astronaut who is sent to the moon on a mission to avert humanity's fate towards extinction after Earth's natural resources have been depleted. The Windows and PlayStation 5 versions were met with mixed reviews, while the PlayStation 4 and Xbox One versions were met with more positive reviews by video game publications.

== Gameplay ==
Deliver Us the Moon is an adventure puzzle game experienced at various points of the narrative from either a first-person or a third-person perspective, which is determined by the type of action that must be completed. For example, the camera shifts to a first-person perspective when the player controls a floating robot tied to a puzzle. The player assumes the role of Rolf, an astronaut who is launched to the Moon on board a space shuttle to investigate a series of seemingly abandoned facilities, where an important resource that plays a vital role in solving an energy crisis on Earth is mined.

The game does not contain any combat sequences, although it is possible for the player character to die as a result of failing a gameplay sequence, necessitating a retry.

== Development and release ==
Deliver Us the Moon was developed by Dutch video game developers Koen Deetman and Paul Deetman through their company KeokeN Interactive. The Deetman brothers were inspired by their grandfather's passion for astronomy, as well as the science fiction films 2001: A Space Odyssey and Interstellar by Christopher Nolan for their "rare blend of human realism and high-concept sci-fi". Deliver Us the Moon received funding through a Kickstarter campaign, and was a successful submission for Steam Greenlight where it was readily upvoted. A demo version of the game was made available in March 2016 during the ID@Xbox Showcase event at GDC 2016, and it was intended to be released episodically for PC and Xbox One from August 2016.

The game was initially released for PC as Deliver Us the Moon: Fortuna on September 28, 2018. In July 2019, Fortuna was removed from sale by the developers, who cited their dissatisfaction with the state of the game when it was launched in September 2018. An expanded version of the game, with the addition of a reworked ending sequence and the Fortuna subtitle removed, was released for PC three months later on October 10, 2019, with all purchased copies of Fortuna receiving a free update. The game received an update on December 19, 2019, which provides DirectX Raytracing support for PC graphics cards with Nvidia DLSS and real-time ray traced effects.

Deliver Us the Moon was released for PlayStation 4 and Xbox One on April 24, 2020, with Wired Productions as the publisher. A planned port for the Nintendo Switch was planned for release but was later canceled in June 2020. Ports for PlayStation 5 and Xbox Series X/S were scheduled to release on May 19, 2022, but were subsequently delayed to June 23, 2022. Four years after the Nintendo Switch port was initially cancelled, publisher Wired Productions and developer KeokeN Interactive announced that the Switch port would be released on July 16, 2024.

On March 30, 2022, the Stadia Community Blog announced that Deliver Us the Moon will be released for Stadia the following month. Wired Productions followed up with a Twitter update on April 1, 2022, which confirmed that the Stadia port had been delayed. The Stadia port released on June 1, 2022.

== Reception ==
Reception

Aggregate score
Aggregator	Score
Metacritic	PC (Fortuna): 63/100; PC: 68/100; PS4: 77/100; XONE: 76/100; PS5: 71/100

Review scores
Publication	Score
Adventure Gamers	3.5/5
Game Informer	8/10
Hardcore Gamer	3.5/5
Push Square	8/10
VideoGamer.com	7/10
Screen Rant	3/5

The Fortuna and expanded versions of Deliver Us the Moon for Windows and PlayStation 5 received "mixed or average" reviews according to review aggregator platform Metacritic; the PlayStation 4 and Xbox One versions received "generally favorable" reviews. Game Informer's Andrew Reiner scored the PS4 version 8 out of 10, praising the writing, narrative pacing and atmosphere, but noting that some of the puzzles became repetitive.

Deliver Us the Moon received two award nominations for the 18th Annual Game Audio Network Guild Awards held on May 6, 2020, and won "Best Sound Design for an Indie Game".

== Sequel ==
Deliver Us Mars, set ten years after the events of Deliver Us the Moon, was announced as part of the Future Games Show Spring Showcase on March 24, 2022. It features a new protagonist - Kathy Johannson (played by Ellise Chappell), who is mentioned as a child in recordings in the first game - who reactivates her companion robot after an apparent ship crash on the planet of Mars. Deliver Us Mars is produced by Frontier Developments and was launched on both Epic Games Store and Steam PC storefronts, as well as PlayStation 4, PlayStation 5, Xbox One, and Xbox Series X/S on February 2, 2023.

== See also ==
- Tacoma - adventure game released around the same time, set in orbit of the Moon
