= Warhammer 40,000: Chaos Gate – Deathwatch =

Upcoming turn-based tactics video game

- Developer: Complex Games
- Publisher: Frontier Developments
- Series: Warhammer 40,000
- Platforms: PlayStation 5; Windows; Xbox Series X/S
- Genres: Turn-based strategy, tactical role-playing
- Mode: Single-player

Warhammer 40,000: Chaos Gate – Deathwatch is an upcoming turn-based tactics video game set in the Games Workshop's Gothic science fiction Warhammer 40,000 fictional universe. It is developed by Complex Games and published by Frontier Developments and is a direct sequel to Warhammer 40,000: Chaos Gate – Daemonhunters. The game is set to be released on PlayStation 5, Windows and Xbox Series X/S.

== Development and release ==
The game was officially announced at Warhammer Skulls 2026 in May 2026. Complex Games, having acquired by Frontier Developments following the success of the game's predecessor Warhammer 40,000: Chaos Gate – Daemonhunters, would return to develop the game. It is due to be launched across PlayStation 5, Windows and Xbox Series X/S platforms.
