= The Outsider (video game) =

Cancelled video game

- Developer: Frontier Developments
- Designer: David Braben
- Platforms: Windows, PlayStation 3, Xbox 360
- Release: Cancelled
- Genre: Action-adventure
- Mode: Single-player

The Outsider was an action-adventure game developed by Frontier Developments for Windows, PlayStation 3 and Xbox 360. Players would control a CIA agent who goes on the run. It was announced in 2005 and cancelled in 2011 following a change in management at the publisher, Codemasters.

== Premise ==
The Outsider was set in Washington, D.C. and its surrounding areas, including the CIA Headquarters in Langley, Virginia, Joint Base Andrews, and Newport News Shipbuilding. The player controlled a CIA officer, Jameson, who could use various hand-to-hand combat styles and weapons. The opening sequence depicted Jameson wrongly becoming a fugitive, and leaves the player to decide how to continue.

Frontier Developments said The Outsider would abandon the traditional, prescriptive, mostly linear story of current generation games, and replaced it by simulating characters' motivations and aims. This gave the player genuine freedom to change the story outcomes, with each player having a unique experience rather than simply switching between good or evil'. The director, David Braben, said that this level of freedom would demonstrate what it is to be a "next-gen" game. A new animation system was being developed with the aim of giving a more realistic feel as it is adaptive and less scripted than typical animations.

== Development ==
According to Engadget, The Outsider spent three years in pre-production and two years in full development, funded by the publisher, Codemasters. Following a change in management, Codemasters dropped the project. Frontier entered negotiations with Electronic Arts about turning The Outsider into a Jason Bourne game with the working title The Bourne Redemption. In January 2011, after six years of development, The Outsider was cancelled, leading to nearly 30 staff layoffs. In 2014, Braben told Eurogamer that The Outsider was probably "gone for good".
