= Darxide =

1996 shoot 'em up video game

- Developer: Frontier Developments
- Publisher: Sega
- Producer: Duncan Kershaw
- Designers: Peter Irvin; David Braben
- Programmer: Peter Irvin
- Artists: Aggy Finn; Chris Mullender; Reece Millidge
- Composers: Adam Salkeld; Richard Jacques
- Platform: 32X
- Release: EU: January 1996
- Genre: Shoot 'em up
- Mode: Single-player

Darxide (stylized as DarXide) is a shoot 'em up video game developed by Frontier Developments and published by Sega for the 32X. It was one of the last releases for the console with only a European release in January 1996. Gameplay is similar to that of Asteroids in three dimensions. Players must destroy a number of space rocks in order to complete each level.

Reception of Darxide was mixed. The game was followed in 2004 by Darxide EMP, an expanded version released for Pocket PCs and Nokia mobile phones.

== Gameplay and development ==
Darxide is a shoot 'em up game. Players control a space fighter, with a set of instrument panels as a head-up display. There are 10 levels in the game. The premise of the game involves a series of asteroids being mined, with defenses protecting them. The object of the game is to eliminate the defenses and destroy the asteroids. Innocent miners, released off the asteroids, also have to be rescued. The game's plot involves an alien race which wants the mining operations for themselves, and have hidden forces inside some hollowed-out asteroids. Destroying those asteroids releases the enemy forces. Players have an auto-targeting weapon, as well as power-ups available later in the game. Levels are timed by the approach of a blue moon; failure to complete the level on time results in loss of a life.

Elements of the game were influenced by designer David Braben, who had previously worked on Frontier: Elite II. Unlike Elite II, the gameplay was designed to be simpler with more focused objectives. The development team expressed the desire to include a voiced computer in-game, similar to those in science fiction movies. Development of the game was covered by Russian magazine Sega Pro.

== Reception and legacy ==
Reception

Review scores
| Publication | Score |
|---|---|
| Mega Fun | 63% |
| Video Games (DE) | 72% |
| MAN!AC | 36% |
| Sega Magazin | 82% |
| Sega News | 80% |
| Mean Machines Sega | 79/100 |

Reception to Darxide was mixed. Mean Machines Sega stated that the gameplay improves and becomes more interesting later into the game, calling the game an homage to Asteroids. Mean Machines called the game "a strangely 'empty' experience that fails to excite." Video Games, a German magazine, praised the game's graphics and solid gameplay, but criticized the sound as being of a quality expected for a Mega Drive game. By contrast, German magazine Mega Fun praised the sound and quality of the graphics, but criticized the gameplay for being monotonous and lacking variety.

Darxide was one of the last games to be released for the 32X, and was only released in Europe. It was followed by a port, Darxide EMP, in 2003 for Pocket PC and Nokia S60 mobile phones. Retro Gamer' commented that Darxide looks impressive given the hardware, though it was made more difficult by the lack of a crosshair on screen. Retro Gamer commented that the game is "alright" and not worth the high prices its rarity garners.

== See also ==
- Shadow Squadron
