= Lemnis Gate =

2021 timeloop first-person shooter video game

- Developer: Ratloop Games Canada
- Publisher: Frontier Foundry
- Platforms: PlayStation 4; PlayStation 5; Windows; Xbox One; Xbox Series X/S
- Release: September 28, 2021
- Genres: Arena shooter, first-person shooter
- Mode: Multiplayer

Lemnis Gate was a first-person arena shooter video game developed by Ratloop Games Canada and published by Frontier Foundry. It was released on September 28, 2021 for the PlayStation 4, PlayStation 5, Windows, Xbox One, and Xbox Series X/S. It was also published to Xbox Game Pass on its first day of release as well.

The game featured players taking turns in competitive multiplayer matches to complete 25 second runs with characters as they attempt to complete objectives. Each player's turn stacked on top of previous rounds, causing players to think critically over the best strategy to take in a given situation to win as previous loops continue.

Reception to the game was generally favorable, with critics praising its interesting take on first-person shooter mechanics and the injection of a new layer of strategy into the genre. The game's multiplayer servers were shut down on July 11, 2023, with reporters noting the game's low player count and that it is shut down during a wave of similar live service game failures.

== Gameplay ==
The player, in a first-person perspective, runs towards an objective, while another one of their operatives from a previous loop runs past them to the left.

Lemnis Gate was a turn-based first-person shooter with time loop and hero shooter elements. Games were either 1v1 or 2v2. The standard game mode, "Seek and Destroy", involved having one side defend five specific objectives from being destroyed at different points on the map while the other side attacked them. Whichever team either destroyed more objectives or defended them at the end of all the rounds would win the match.

=== Time loop mechanic ===
Central to Lemnis Gate was its time loop gameplay mechanic. Each player led a team of six operatives with different abilities and took turns attempting to complete objectives in 25-second loops. Players would continue in alternating order until all of the operatives had completed a loop. Previously used operatives automatically carried out the actions that the player inputted for them in previous loops, and later operatives could disrupt the actions that they took in order to stop them from completing objectives.

One reviewer gave an example of how the loops affected gameplay: their operative was able to damage an opponent's character enough from an earlier loop that it caused a cascading effect, allowing them to eliminate all of the previously looped operatives and get a draw from a match because of the butterfly effect. Games could quickly devolve into puzzle-solving sessions, as players strategize over the best operative to choose and the best strategy to take in a given situation to score the most points. The game included a tutorial area which allows players to try out the different skillsets of the operatives before playing, but the game quickly pushes players into online matches.

== Development ==
The development of Lemnis Gate was inspired by conversations that started in 2015, and development began in earnest in the middle of 2017. Game Director James Anderson explained their choice of using novel time mechanics, saying, "... there's a lot of competition in the first person shooter genre, so we had to come up with a really unique hook and way to play the game." The developers felt that there was a large amount of competition in the first-person shooter space and wanted to create something with a unique take to attract players.

The game originally had a larger tutorial, but after Ratloop tested it with players, found that people were not interested in going through a lengthy intro before getting to play the game. The title of the game refers to the lemniscate, a mathematical curve that loops in on itself like a figure-eight. The game was delayed by a month to allow for more polish, and was also released on Xbox Game Pass simultaneously as its general release.

== Reception ==
Reception to the game was generally favorable according to Metacritic, with critics praising its unique take on the hero shooter genre while sometimes criticizing its complexity. PC Gamer's Robert Zak felt that the game made familiar concepts from other first-person shooters interesting and fresh again, noting that the game "could prove an ever-swirling timesink for shooter fans with a cerebral side." Rock Paper Shotgun's Matt Cox felt differently, saying that the game's often ended up being very evenly matched and that the last person to go would often win. In a mixed review, NME's Jim Trinca felt that though the game's concept is interesting and that its ideas are brilliant, the first-person shooter mechanics that underpinned it were "underwhelming." IGN Italy's Di Angelo Bianco echoed Trinca's thoughts, noting that the game's underlying concept made up for some of the lack of personality its setting and characters exhibited. The game was on a GameSpot list which highlighted the highest-ranked first-person shooters on Metacritic from 2021.

=== Server shutdown ===
After failing to meet player count and sales expectations, Ratloop announced that the game would be delisted from all digital storefronts on April 11, 2023, with multiplayer servers shutting down on July 11. Console players can play a very limited form of the game via local multiplayer and the game's training modes, while gamers who purchased the game on PC are unable to play the title at all after its July shutdown. PC players asked the developers in the comments of the shutdown announcement to enable local multiplayer, which would allow the game to be played offline, but the developers did not respond. Reporters observed the game maintained a low number of concurrent players and speculated this contributed to the decision for the shutdown. Gameindustry.biz's James Batchelor and Push Square's Stephen Tailby noted that the title's failure is among a wave of several online and live service game shutdowns in 2023, continuing a market trend. Game Developer's Justin Carter said that the game was joining "2023's multiplayer graveyard."
