= Conqueror (video game) =

1988 video game

- Developers: Jonathan Griffiths, David Braben, Chris Sawyer
- Publishers: Superior, Acornsoft, Rainbow Arts
- Designer: Jonathan Griffiths
- Platforms: Acorn Archimedes, Amiga, Atari ST, DOS
- Release: EU: 1988; (Archimedes): EU: 1990; (Amiga/ST/DOS)
- Genres: Third-person shooter, strategy
- Modes: Single player, multiplayer

Conqueror is a video game released as the follow-up to Zarch (also known as Virus), using the same landscape engine. It is a third-person shooter with strategy elements in which the player controls a fleet of tanks. It was originally developed and released on the Acorn Archimedes by Superior Software in 1988 and ported to other home computers in 1990 by Rainbow Arts. The game was well received, particularly for its blend of strategy and arcade action.

== Gameplay ==
In-game screenshot (Amiga)

The game is set in the Second World War era and in a 3D polygonal environment. The player controls a fleet of tanks from either the American, German or Russian army. There are various tanks available with different abilities from light, fast tanks that are easily damaged to heavy, slow tanks with high firepower.

The player controls an individual tank from a third-person perspective with computer AI controlling the other friendly tanks as well as the enemy tanks. By switching to a map screen, the player can change which tank they control and also direct tanks to different places on the map. The game carries on in real-time while the player is looking at the map. Control can be split so that two players can cooperate to control the tank so one player drives the tank while the other controls the gun. Single players can choose for the computer to take the role of the second player or control both together.

There are three types of game; 'Arcade', 'Attrition' and 'Strategy'. In the 'arcade' version, the player controls just one tank and faces a never-ending stream of enemy tanks that becomes progressively more difficult and cannot be 'won'. The object of the game is simply to survive as long as possible. The 'attrition' game gives the player a set fleet of tanks which are pitted against a similar set of enemy tanks. The 'strategy' version is the full game. The player begins with limited funds which are used to buy a fleet of tanks. Extra funds are gained by completing missions which can then be used to add to the fleet with up to fifteen tanks being available. Other extra features in this version of the game include artillery bombardment which can be ordered to strike at a specific point on the map and spotter planes which can be used to find out where the enemy tanks are on the map. Both of these actions use up funds. Tanks are damaged when hit but if they can be driven away from the combat area, they can be repaired. Missions are generally won either by destroying all enemy tanks or by occupying a specific point on the map for a set time without coming under attack.

== Development and release ==
Conqueror was designed and coded by Jonathan Griffiths using the Zarch game engine which was created by David Braben (co-author of Elite). Like Zarch, it was originally developed and released on the 32-bit Acorn Archimedes. It was published in 1988 by Superior Software.

Following the success of Virus, the name given to Zarch for its multi-format release in 1988, Conqueror was also ported to the Amiga, Atari ST and DOS. The Amiga and ST ports were carried out by Griffiths (with graphics by Torsten Zimmerman), while the DOS version was ported by Chris Sawyer. These versions were released by Rainbow Arts in 1990.

== Reception ==
Reception

Review scores
Publication	Score
ACE	931/1000 (Archimedes); 925/1000 (Amiga); 920/1000 (Atari ST)
The Games Machine	87% (Archimedes); 80% (DOS); 80% (Atari ST)
Amiga Format	93% (Amiga)
Power Play	69% (Atari ST)
Amiga Joker	63% (Amiga)

The game was well received by critics, generally comparable to Zarch/Virus. The Archimedes version was given a score of 931 (out of 1000) by ACE magazine and 87% by The Games Machine who viewed it as an improvement over Zarch; "With more depth than Superior's previous Archimedes game, Conqueror is a change towards the more strategic style of game and as such is a change for the better - a product that is addictive and challenging in both the arcade and strategy sense of the word".

The later versions generally scored slightly lower in the multi-format magazines with ACE giving the Amiga and ST versions 925 and 920 respectively, while The Games Machine gave both the ST and DOS versions 80%. Amiga Format called the game "first-class", and said it "will appeal to everyone who likes a good blast but also likes to think they can master a situation by good tactical planning", awarding a score of 93%.
