= V2000 (video game) =

1998 video game

- Developers: David Braben, Frontier Developments
- Publisher: Grolier Interactive
- Platforms: PC, Playstation
- Release: 1998
- Mode: Single-player

V2000, also known as Virus 2000, is a 1998 video game developed by David Braben. The game was released on PlayStation and PC. It is a sequel to Zarch (also called Virus), and was intended to be less challenging than the original game.

== Development ==
The game was developed by Frontier Developments and published by Grolier Interactive. The developer of the game, David Braben, improved the controls of the game in comparison to its predecessor Virus, making the camera more responsive and the flight controls more intuitive. He stated that "Most people [playing Virus] flew, flipped upside down, died and gave up. I wanted to avoid that this time." The game was released on PC and PlayStation in October 1998.

== Overview ==
The game is divided into 30 levels, as the player attempts to eradicate an aggressive virus being spread across 30 worlds by a hostile alien species. The player must complete at least sixteen levels to finish the game. The player pilots an aircraft that can transform into either a hovercraft, which is slow but agile and requires no fuel, or an airborne vehicle which is fast and unwieldy while requiring a fuel supply. Throughout the game, the players traverses, aerial, land, and aquatic environments. In order to halt the spread, the player must destroy the aliens and their hives. The player can also choose to rescue native inhabitants of the planet by beaming them aboard their ship. These natives can be brought to factories where they will help develop weapons for the player. If the player fails to stop the spread of the virus, the world will be transformed into a "Dark World" variant in which all life has been eradicated. The player has a second chance to defeat the aliens on the Dark World.

The game includes six different world types, including Green, Underwater, Rock, Swamp, Medieval, and Alien planets.

== Reception ==
The game received positive reviews from critics. In 1998, the V2000 was nominated in the "Games" category of the BAFTA Interactive Entertainment Awards. Despite this critical response, it did not sell as well as Virus. However, it developed a following among hardcore gamers.

Ed Ricketts of PC Gamer praised its gameplay, range of weaponry, and animation. PC Zone wrote that "The clever thing about V2000 is that it works on two levels: shoot 'em up fans will get short-term satisfaction from the blasting action, while strategists will enjoy exercising their grey matter." A review from PC Player offered similar praise. Njal Sand of Gamers Haven called it "a very odd game with a fun concept but a very flawed execution." Tim Chown of Games Domain praised the action, graphics, sound, and world design, but wrote that the controls were "hellishly difficult" to get used to.

A retrospective review from Home of the Underdogs highlighted the game's addictively hardcore gameplay and graphical quality.

== See also ==
- V2000 at MobyGames
