= Wallace & Gromit in Project Zoo =

2003 video game

- North American Xbox cover art
- Developer: Frontier Developments
- Publisher: BAM! Entertainment
- Platforms: GameCube, PlayStation 2, Xbox, Microsoft Windows
- Release: GameCube, PlayStation 2, Xbox: EU: 3 October 2003; NA: 8 October 2003 (PS2); NA: 16 October 2003 (GC, Xbox); Microsoft Windows: EU: 24 October 2003
- Genre: Platform
- Mode: Single-player

Wallace & Gromit in Project Zoo is a platform video game developed by Frontier Developments, published by BAM! Entertainment, and produced by Aardman for the GameCube, PlayStation 2, Xbox and Microsoft Windows. It is the first console game to feature Aardman Animations' characters Wallace & Gromit, with Peter Sallis reprising his role as the voice of Wallace. The game follows the duo as they battle with Feathers McGraw (the villain from The Wrong Trousers).

== Gameplay ==
As Gromit, the player must use Wallace's bizarre inventions - including the Porridge Gun, Turnip Launcher, Springy Boots, and Gyrocopter - to battle Feathers McGraw's robotic minions and rescue the baby animals in typical platform game style.

== Plot ==
Wallace and Gromit have adopted Archie, a baby polar bear at the local zoo. When they go to the zoo to celebrate his birthday, they find the zoo padlocked and supposedly under new management. They discover that Feathers McGraw is now running the zoo and has kidnapped Archie. Back at home, Wallace and Gromit design a giant wooden penguin (a parody of the Trojan Horse) which gets them inside the zoo. Entering the jungle house, they find that Feathers has captured baby elephants to force their parents to work for him. Soon, Wallace finds an entrance to a mine where Gromit must battle a mole machine in the first boss fight of the game. After the mole machine is destroyed, Feathers escapes underground. Wallace sees a poster nearby denoting a countdown to D-Day, which he finds odd.

Travelling underground, Wallace and Gromit are briefly separated, forcing Gromit to navigate mining machinery and mine cart tracks. It also turns out Feathers has imprisoned baby beavers to force their parents to work. Wallace and Gromit corner Feathers, but he drops them through a trapdoor into a flooded room where they are nearly crushed before Gromit unlocks the door. The duo are briefly separated again, with Gromit needing to navigate around lava, fire and enemies before they are reunited and find imprisoned baby gorillas who Gromit is soon able to free. In appreciation, the gorillas open up the lift, allowing them further access. Eventually, after freeing all three gorillas, Wallace and Gromit find their way back to the Gyro-Copter, where they see Feathers activating some machinery.

Wallace and Gromit gum up the machinery and Feathers uses an escape pod to flee, which they follow. After eventually finding Feathers and Archie, Feathers cuts the lights, allowing him to escape to the Polar exhibit. Eventually, Wallace soups up a pedalo boat with a turnip launcher. After obtaining Feathers' remote control, Wallace accidentally activates Feathers' submarine, forcing Gromit to destroy it and icebergs.

Wallace and Gromit then find Feathers has created a Diamond-O-Matic to create diamonds, reminding Wallace of the D-Day poster. Archie accidentally gets sent into the machine, and Gromit must enter the machine and protect Archie from various threats such as fire and ice. They are able to rescue Archie and go to confront Feathers. In the final boss fight of the game, Wallace is imprisoned in a cell and Gromit must battle Feathers in a giant robot suit. Upon the robot being defeated, Wallace is freed from his cell and Feathers activates a rocket pack to escape. However, upon reaching the zoo entrance, Feathers is confronted by the parent animals before being caged by the elephants and dropping his diamond, which is swiftly picked up by Gromit. Wallace happily notes that Feathers will not be troubling them again in a hurry, with the penguin being back in his cell from the end of the Wrong Trousers. Photos shown during the credits show Archie celebrating his birthday with his mother at Wallace and Gromit's house.

== Development ==
The game was announced in May 2002 for a 2003 release window on GameCube, PlayStation 2, Xbox and PC.

== Reception ==
Reception

Aggregate score
Aggregator	Score		
Aggregator	GameCube	PS2	Xbox
Metacritic	66/100	67/100	63/100

Review scores
Publication	Score		
Publication	GameCube	PS2	Xbox
Electronic Gaming Monthly	5.83/10	5.83/10	5.83/10
Game Informer	N/A	7.5/10	N/A
GameSpot	6.5/10	6.5/10	6.5/10
GameZone	7/10	7.4/10	N/A
IGN	6.7/10	6.7/10	6.7/10
NGC Magazine	70%	N/A	N/A
Nintendo Power	3.3/5	N/A	N/A
Official U.S. PlayStation Magazine	N/A	3/5	N/A
Official Xbox Magazine (US)	N/A	N/A	7.5/10
TeamXbox	N/A	N/A	6.5/10

Wallace & Gromit in Project Zoo received "mixed or average reviews" on all platforms according to the review aggregation website Metacritic.

Dr Leevil of BBC News, gave the game a score of 7 out of 10 and said: "All in all I would say that this game is beautiful to look at but generally not the most exciting. I did enjoy seeing Gromit doing some kung-fu moves though".

=== Awards ===
Award	Year	Category	Result	Ref
BAFTA	2004	1st British Academy Games Awards	Lost to EyeToy: Play	
