= F1 Manager (video game series) =

Video game series by Frontier Developments

- Logo of the first instalment, F1 Manager 2022
- Genre: Racing management
- Developer: Frontier Developments
- Publisher: Frontier Developments
- Platforms: Nintendo Switch; PlayStation 4; PlayStation 5; Windows; Xbox One; Xbox Series X/S
- First release: F1 Manager 2022; 30 August 2022
- Latest release: F1 Manager 2024; 23 July 2024

F1 Manager (often shortened F1M) is a discontinued racing management simulation game series developed and published by Frontier Developments. It held the official license of the FIA Formula One World Championship, the FIA Formula 2 Championship, and the FIA Formula 3 Championship, which are governed by the Fédération Internationale de l'Automobile. A total of three instalments have been released.

== History ==
Release timeline
2022	F1 Manager 2022
2023	F1 Manager 2023
2024	F1 Manager 2024

Following the commercial success of Planet Coaster and Planet Zoo, Frontier Developments signed an exclusive licensing deal to release four Formula One management video games. It marked the first motorsport title for Frontier Developments. The series was released at an annual pace.

The first video game of the series, F1 Manager 2022, was released in 2022. It marked the first Formula One licensed management game since F1 Manager of EA Sports in 2000. In the second entry, F1 Manager 2023, the game engine was updated from Unreal Engine 4 to Unreal Engine 5. The latest entry, F1 Manager 2024, was released in July 2024. This entry introduced "Create A Team" mode, which is similar to the "My Team" feature of the F1 series by Codemasters and EA Sports, that allows players to create their own team. The game was released on Nintendo Switch for the first time.

After initially planning to release F1 Manager 2025, the game was reportedly cancelled in late 2024 due to poor sales of previous games which eventually led to the discontinuation of the series as a whole.

== Reception ==
Aggregate review scores As of June 2025.
Game	Year	Metacritic
F1 Manager 2022	2022	PC: 79/100; PS5: 74/100; XSXS: 80/100
F1 Manager 2023	2023	PC: 79/100; PS5: 76/100; XSXS: 81/100
F1 Manager 2024	2024	PC: 81/100; PS5: 80/100; XSXS: 78/100

All three games in the series received "generally favorable" reviews according to review aggregator Metacritic, but they underperformed commercially. F1 Manager 2022 sold around 600,000 copies as of January 2023, and F1 Manager 2023 also underperformed. This did not meet Frontier's expection, and the company's share price dropped by forty percent. This also contributed to layoffs at Frontier Foundry, Frontier's publishing operations, in an organisational review. In response to the series' underperformance, the next entry, F1 Manager 2024, was priced lower in comparison to Codemasters' F1 24.
