= F1 Manager 2024 =

2024 video game by Frontier Developments

- Cover art, featuring from left to right: McLaren's Andrea Stella, Ferrari's Frédéric Vasseur, and Mercedes's Toto Wolff.
- Developer: Frontier Developments
- Publisher: Frontier Developments
- Composer: Brian Tyler
- Series: F1 Manager
- Engine: Unreal Engine 5
- Platforms: Nintendo Switch; PlayStation 4; PlayStation 5; Windows; Xbox One; Xbox Series X/S
- Release: WW: 23 July 2024
- Genre: Sports management
- Mode: Single-player

F1 Manager 2024 is a sports management game, developed and published by Frontier Developments. It is the official racing management simulation game of the 2024 Formula One World Championship, the third and final instalment in Frontier Developments' F1 Manager series. The game was released for Nintendo Switch, PlayStation 4, PlayStation 5, Windows, Xbox One and Xbox Series X/S on 23 July 2024.

== Gameplay ==
Alongside the series' traditional gameplay, F1 Manager 2024 included a new "Create A Team" mode, giving players the chance to participate as an 11th team on the grid for the first time. This allows players to create a vehicle with a custom livery for their team, in addition to the standard management abilities available if they select one of the existing outfits. Race replay mode, introduced in F1 Manager 2023, also returned to allow players to re-live moments from the real-world 2024 season. Sky Sports F1 commentators David Croft and Karun Chandhok returned to narrate the key moments in the game.

== Development and release ==
F1 Manager 2024 is the third title in the F1 Manager series, with all three titles developed and published by Frontier Developments in the United Kingdom. In addition to the regular release for PlayStation 4, PlayStation 5, Windows, Xbox One and Xbox Series X/S, the game also launched on Nintendo Switch for the first time in the series. The game was released on 23 July 2024.

Frontier released numerous updates to the title which fixed numerous issues and added new features that were otherwise not in the game, including red flags, pit-lane starts and improved scouting. A full-season customisation option was added as part of the final update. Mods have been released for the game that added representations of the 2025 and 2026 seasons, the latter featuring full models of the new cars. A database editor exists that allows players to modify their save file.

This is the last instalment in the F1 Manager series, with a 2025 instalment reportedly cancelled in late 2024 due to poor sales of previous games which eventually led to the discontinuation of the series as a whole.

== Reception ==
Both the Xbox Series X and PC versions of F1 Manager 2024 received "generally favorable" reviews, according to the review aggregation website Metacritic and getting an average of 7/10 or 8/10 according to OpenCritic.
