= LostWinds =

2008 video game

- Cover art
- Developer: Frontier Developments
- Publisher: Frontier Developments
- Series: LostWinds
- Platforms: Wii, iOS, Microsoft Windows
- Release: Wii: NA: May 12, 2008; PAL: May 20, 2008; iOS; December 21, 2011; Microsoft Windows; March 24, 2016
- Genres: Platforming, metroidvania
- Modes: Single-player, multiplayer

LostWinds is a 2008 platform video game developed by Frontier Developments and published for the Wii as a launch title for WiiWare. In LostWinds, the player controls a young boy named Toku and the elemental wind spirit Enril (and in two-player mode, a second player also controls Enril) as they travel Mistralis in order to rescue it from the antagonist Balasar, a vengeful spirit.

In Japan, the game was ported and published by Square Enix on December 24, 2008.

Due to its success it was ported to iOS. A sequel, LostWinds 2: Winter of the Melodias, was released on October 9, 2009.

== Gameplay ==
The player controls Toku and Enril simultaneously, using the Wii Remote on the Wii or a gesture on iOS to draw directional paths on-screen that control the wind. Wind is used to enhance Toku's jumps, defeat or immobilise enemies and solve puzzles. A second player can join in with their Wii Remote controlling a second on-screen wind cursor, allowing Toku to fly farther but not higher.

== Plot ==
A boy named Toku is awakened by the wind. As he heads back toward his home, the bridge he is on collapses and he falls into a cave, where he finds a crystal shard. The shard starts talking and reveals itself to be a spirit of wind, Enril. Enril was trapped in this form when Balasar, one of the spirits assigned to watch over the land, decided to conquer the world. Using all her might Enril trapped Balasar in a crystal, but in the process she herself was also trapped. Eventually Balasar grew powerful enough to break free, but Enril was still trapped.

Using Enril's power Toku is able to navigate himself out of the cave and learns how to use the wind to jump higher in the process. Once out he goes to see Deo, his babysitter. Enril seems to recognize Deo but Deo does not hear her. Deo tells Toku to buy him something from the herb store. However it is revealed that the village has been hit by several earthquakes lately. One of the quakes destroys the herb shop. Seeing nothing else for Toku to do, Deo lets him go play.

Questioning why Deo did not hear her, Enril talks to Toku and a nearby archaeologist hears Enril. He tells them about how the ancients built several devices to beckon the return of the spirit of the wind. He points out one such device in a cave known as The Chamber of Memories. Toku and Enril follow his directions and discover a cave that has several statues, along with the Slipstream ability. Upon opening it they decide to talk to Deo who reveals he knows Enril and is one of the spirits himself.

Before Deo can help though he says his memory has been locked away in four chests, including the one the player already opened. He tells them to check the old mines and inside they find the Vortex ability and a new chest. Returning Deo tells them about another chest located near the falls and the other in the abandoned village. Deo gives Toku a Jumbrella Cape to allow him to fly.

Once the chests are opened Deo says he remembers where his power is. He left it with a monster known as Magmok, located below the Chamber of Memories. Despite saying Magmok is a friendly creature, the Chamber shakes and the monster roars. Deo warns Toku and the two head outside to see a corrupted Magmok rise from the earth, revealing he was the cause of the quakes. Toku removes the pieces of corruption on his hands and head and Magmok removes the rest. He then picks up Deo and gives him a shining light.

In the epilogue, Deo tells the other spirits that Enril is back, but Balasar got a hold of the message as well and is plotting to defeat the "boy-hero".

== Development ==
The genesis of LostWinds stems from a Frontier "Game of the Week" competition to develop a game that took advantage of the Wii Remote. The idea for the game itself came from Steve Burgess, a designer for Frontier. He was watching the wind blow through some trees and began thinking about a way to have a player become the wind in a game. He began envisioning puzzles and later added a second character to be "moved" and "protected" by the wind, and applied his ideas to the Wii Remote.

== Release and availability ==
LostWinds and its sequel were available for iOS, but an iOS update resulted in both games crashing during startup. This bug was never fixed and the games have both subsequently been removed from the store. Square Enix published the game in Japan on December 24, 2008.

LostWinds was initially the only listed WiiWare game that was unavailable for download or transfer onto the Wii U at the console's launch in November 2012, but this had since been patched in April 2014. The game was ultimately delisted from sale on both Wii and Wii U following the discontinuation of the Wii Shop Channel service in January 2019.

== Reception ==
Reception

Aggregate score
Aggregator	Score	
Aggregator	iOS	Wii
Metacritic	74/100	81/100

Review scores
Publication	Score	
Publication	iOS	Wii
Edge	N/A	8/10
Eurogamer	N/A	9/10
GamePro	N/A	5/5
GameRevolution	N/A	B+
GameSpot	N/A	5.5/10
Gamezebo	3.5/5	N/A
GameZone	N/A	8.5/10
IGN	N/A	8.2/10
Official Nintendo Magazine	N/A	83%
Pocket Gamer	3.5/5	N/A
TouchArcade	4/5	N/A
The A.V. Club	N/A	B−
Metro	5/10	N/A

The Wii version received "favorable" reviews, while the iOS version received "average" reviews, according to the review aggregation website Metacritic. IGN praised the Wii version's sound and graphics, calling the presentation "remarkable", and felt the gameplay was fresh and fun with clever puzzles and tight controls. However, they had concerns with the short length of said console version, which they claimed could be finished in about three hours, but felt this was offset by the relatively inexpensive price compared to a retail game. Eurogamer also praised the presentation, controls and puzzles, claiming it to be a "mini-masterpiece", while GamePro gave the Wii version a perfect score, calling it "beautiful and unique".

1UP.com thought the same console version was "charming, beautiful, and loaded with smart, judicious use of the Wii Remote" while voicing minor concerns with its length, while Nintendo Life thought said console version was "innovative" but "not quite as revolutionary in terms of play control as some had hoped", though they stated that it was "a step in the right direction" for the platform genre and WiiWare games as a whole. N-Europe praised Frontier's "astounding attention to detail" in LostWinds and its visuals which make it seem like a "living, breathing fairytale". In contrast, GameSpot thought LostWinds was "brimming with potential", but ended up being very disappointed with many aspects of the game, including its short length, and claimed a lack of "energy" and "personality" in the game.

411Mania gave the Wii version 8.5 out of 10 and was generally positive to its gameplay. In contrast, The A.V. Club gave it a B−, stating that it doesn't live up to its potential. They were critical to its environments being too similar, the story as predictable and the difficulty as too easy. Metro gave the iOS version five out of ten. They praised the graphics, but panned its unresponsive touch controls.

Addressing the short length of the Wii version, Frontier founder David Braben believed LostWinds stacked up favorably against some recent, full priced retail games which offer as little as between four and seven hours of gameplay. It was awarded Best Use of the Wii-Mote by IGN in its 2008 video game awards. IGN also nominated it for several other Wii-specific awards, including Best WiiWare Game, Best Artistic Design, and Best Platform Game.

== Sequel ==
At the end of the game, a short epilogue is played as well as the words "to be continued...". Shortly after the release of LostWinds, Frontier Developments announced that a sequel was in development. A sequel called LostWinds 2: Winter of the Melodias was released on October 19, 2009.
