= Thrillville: Off the Rails =

2007 video game

- Developers: Frontier Developments; DC Studios (Nintendo DS)
- Publisher: LucasArts
- Producer: Michael Brookes
- Designer: Daniel Gould
- Programmer: Stefan Mars
- Artist: John Laws
- Writer: Greg Orlando
- Composers: David W. Collins; Jesse Harlin
- Platforms: Microsoft Windows; Nintendo DS; PlayStation 2; PlayStation Portable; Wii; Xbox 360
- Release: NA: October 16, 2007; AU: October 17, 2007; EU: October 19, 2007; AU: October 25, 2007 (Wii)
- Genre: Simulation
- Modes: Single-player, multiplayer

Thrillville: Off the Rails is a theme park simulation video game developed by Frontier Developments and published by LucasArts. It is the sequel to the 2006 game Thrillville. The game was released worldwide in October 2007. DC Studios developed the Nintendo DS version, which is a completely different game.

The Xbox 360 version of Thrillville: Off the Rails was made backwards compatible on Xbox One and Xbox Series X/S on November 15, 2021.

The PlayStation Portable version of the game was made available on PlayStation Store for PlayStation 4 and PlayStation 5 on December 19, 2023.

== Plot ==
The player's Uncle Mortimer (Brian Greene) congratulates the player for making Thrillville one of the best theme parks in the world and for ridding the competition of Globo-Joy in the first game. However, he also warns the player that Globo-Joy's president, Vernon Garrison, might be out to get his revenge on Thrillville. It is later shown that each of the parks has been sabotaged by Globo-Joy, with Garrison himself having manipulated critics to give bad reviews of Thrillville Stunts, hypnotized guests into acting strangely in Thrillville Giant, sent armies of robotic freeloaders to Thrillville Otherworlds, and used disgruntled employees to vandalize Thrillville Explorer. It also later becomes apparent that a Globo-Joy mole has made it into Thrillville's employment and is stealing the park's ideas for Globo-Joy. After some sleuthing, it is discovered that the mole is in fact Garrison's son, Vernon Jr., who posed as a guest named Tim Twinklefingers. The player later gets to manage Thrillville Holidays in order to also find Garrison Jr. and challenge him to a round of Robo KO (a fighting game-esque minigame with two robots fighting each other). Once defeated, Garrison Jr. is dismissed from Thrillville and sent home.

== Gameplay ==
Like the original game, Thrillville: Off The Rails is a strategy and simulation game about being the park manager of all of the Thrillville theme parks. The game allows the placing and deletion of attractions and buildings such as flat rides, food and drink stalls, bathrooms, games, and also contains various minigames to play both in the park and in the game's "Party Play" mode, along with editing and allowing the players to ride their own roller coasters inside each of the Thrillville theme parks.

== Reception ==
Reception

Aggregate score
Aggregator	Score					
Aggregator	DS	PC	PS2	PSP	Wii	Xbox 360
Metacritic	59/100	70/100	70/100	72/100	70/100	73/100

Review scores
Publication	Score					
Publication	DS	PC	PS2	PSP	Wii	Xbox 360
Eurogamer	N/A	N/A	N/A	N/A	7/10	N/A
Game Informer	N/A	N/A	7/10	N/A	7/10	7/10
GamePro	N/A	N/A	N/A	N/A	N/A	3.75/5
GameRevolution	N/A	N/A	N/A	N/A	N/A	B−
GameSpot	6.5/10	7.5/10	7.5/10	7.5/10	7.5/10	7.5/10
GameSpy	N/A	N/A	3.5/5	3.5/5	3.5/5	3.5/5
GameZone	5.3/10	N/A	N/A	N/A	N/A	8.2/10
IGN	4.5/10	7.9/10	7.8/10	7.6/10	7.8/10	7.9/10
Official Nintendo Magazine	N/A	N/A	N/A	N/A	72%	N/A
Official Xbox Magazine (US)	N/A	N/A	N/A	N/A	N/A	7.5/10
PC Gamer (US)	N/A	75%	N/A	N/A	N/A	N/A
PlayStation: The Official Magazine	N/A	N/A	2/5	N/A	N/A	N/A

The game received "mixed or average reviews" on all platforms according to the review aggregation website Metacritic. Most critics cited that the mini-games are a welcome addition, especially for multiplayer; however, the game was criticized for its so-so graphics, including the PC and Xbox 360 versions. Critics also cited some cases of repetitiveness in gameplay.
