= Kinectimals =

2010 video game

- European cover art
- Developer: Frontier Developments
- Publisher: Microsoft Game Studios
- Director: Jonny Watts
- Producer: Michael Brookes
- Designer: Ben Dowie
- Programmer: Matthew Simper
- Artist: John Laws
- Composer: Peter McConnell
- Platforms: Xbox 360, Windows Phone, iOS, Android
- Release: Xbox 360: NA: November 4, 2010; EU: November 10, 2010; AU: November 18, 2010; Windows Phone: WW: October 10, 2011; iOS: NA: December 13, 2011
- Genre: Digital pet
- Mode: Single-player

Kinectimals (known as Kinect Animals in Japan and South Korea) is a video game for the Xbox 360 that uses Kinect, with versions also available for various mobile devices. In the game, players can interact with virtual animals in a manner akin to pets, gameplay includes activities such as teaching tricks to the animal, guiding the animal around an obstacle course, and free-form play.

The video game is aimed at a young audience, particularly children, and includes eleven different virtual animals all based on wild cats. Kinectimals was developed by Frontier Developments and was a launch title for Kinect. There were also plush toys that come with scan tags that players can use to unlock new cubs and toys.

An add-on, Kinectimals: Bear Island, was released as downloadable content on October 11, 2011, along with Kinectimals: Now with Bears!, a single retail disc that bundles Bear Island with the base game. Plushes include scan tags, which players can use to unlock new cubs. Exclusive plushes to the bear version include a FAO Schwarz plush with a scan tag and four from Build-A-Bear Workshop, featuring Champ Bear, Colorful Hearts Bear, Endless Hearts Teddy and Peace & Hearts Bear that also have scan tags. There was also another app, Kinectimals Unleashed, which features dogs in addition to more bear and wild cat cubs. The apps are now discontinued.

== Gameplay ==
Throughout the game players spend time using the Kinect system to feed, play with, care, and even raise an animal cub. Upon starting the game the player will visit Fur Town, where they choose one of the 6 initial cubs. When they adopt a cub, they can take a picture and name it. As they play the game, new areas, more cubs and items can be unlocked. Throughout the game there are 11 cubs. The cat-lemur fairy, Bumble (voiced by Richard Steven Horvitz) guides the player through the game. When players play games and challenges, they earn coins. At the shop run by lemurs, the players can spend their earned coins to buy stuff like toys, feather wands, balls, jump ropes, flying toys, radio-controlled cars, food, drinks, collars, pendants, furniture and other things. Other stuff can also be unlocked by winning gold medals. Also in the areas of the game, players can use the Plunderscope to find hidden treasures which also unlocks accessories and even use a net to catch butterflies. Players can also use the scan tags on the plush toys to unlock new cubs and other toys. A female fairy named Lina (voiced by Grey DeLisle) appears in the bear version of the game to guide the player through the game and solving Fiddler's Quest. Each of these games take place in the islands Lemuria and Mira. In the bear version of the game, it includes new games such as juggling, tree climbing, and fishing as well as new wild cat cubs.

== Reception ==
Reception

Aggregate scores
Aggregator	Score
GameRankings	75.88%
Metacritic	74/100

Review scores
Publication	Score
1Up.com	B−
Eurogamer	7/10
Game Informer	8/10
GameSpot	7.5/10
GamesRadar+	8/10
GameTrailers	8.5/10
IGN	7.0/10
Official Xbox Magazine (US)	8/10
X-Play	3/5

Kinectimals has received mostly positive reviews. Video game talk show Good Game's two presenters gave the game a 7 and 7.5 out of 10 saying how it was quite fun and that the player's animal would give instant feedback as well most younger gamers would love playing it. Initially they said "It has a lot more life, energy and fun to it than something like EyePet - there's a lot of sparkle, but I was okay with that." An IGN review described Kinectimals as, "the cutest game in existence", but reported that the motion controls did not perform well for some games and that there are too many menus.
