= Far: Lone Sails =

2018 video game

- Developer: Okomotive
- Publisher: Mixtvision (Note: Distributed by Assemble Entertainment since 2022)
- Engine: Unity
- Platforms: macOS; Windows; PlayStation 4; Xbox One; Nintendo Switch; Android; iOS
- Release: macOS, Windows; May 17, 2018; PlayStation 4, Xbox One; April 2, 2019; Nintendo Switch; August 18, 2019; Android, iOS; October 22, 2020
- Genre: Adventure
- Mode: Single-player

Far: Lone Sails (stylized as FAR: Lone Sails) is an exploration adventure video game developed by the Swiss development company Okomotive. The game was released for Windows and macOS in May 2018, for PlayStation 4 and Xbox One in April 2019, for Nintendo Switch in August 2019, and for Android and iOS in October 2020. A sequel, Far: Changing Tides, was released in March 2022.

== Gameplay ==
Screenshot from FAR: Lone Sails showing the cross-sectional view of the player's vehicle

In FAR, the player controls the driver of a large vehicle as they search through a post-apocalypse setting. The game is played from a side-scrolling perspective, with the vehicle interior seen as a cross-section. To control the vehicle the player must move around inside it, operating stations and pressing buttons to perform various functions that keep the vehicle moving, such as engaging the engine or filling the boiler with fuel sources found over the course of the player's journey. The various parts of the vehicle can take damage, requiring the player to stop and extinguish fires and repair damaged systems. They are also required to solve puzzles in the world to allow the vehicle to pass and collect upgrades for it. The game has no enemies, though the player-character can die due to environmental hazards, and will restart at the last checkpoint.

While the game starts with a burial scene, the rest of the background story is intentionally vague, with the developers intending for the player's curiosity to motivate them to explore. The landscapes passed during the game show the ruins of a technologically advanced civilization, and a world where the oceans have dried up, leaving massive ships scuttled on dry beds and bouts of extremely hazardous weather.

== Development and release ==
FAR began in 2015 as the Bachelor's degree student project of lead developer Don Schmocker at the Zurich University of the Arts. During his master's degree he continued the development together with his fellow student Goran Saric. They founded the game studio Okomotive in February 2017 and expanded the team with other students and friends from University. Schmocker was inspired by Strandbeests, the book Stephen Biesty's Incredible Cross-Sections, The Straight Story, and games such as Journey and LittleBigPlanet when designing FAR. Looking to take a new approach to the use of vehicles in video games, the developers aimed to create a game where the player was dependent on their vehicle, forming an emotional attachment to it over the course of the game. The game is developed in Unity, and the developers use Blender and Adobe Photoshop for the 3D and 2D graphics respectively.

FAR was released for macOS and Windows on May 17, 2018, for PlayStation 4 and Xbox One on April 2, 2019, for Nintendo Switch on August 18, 2019, and for Android and iOS on October 22, 2020.

== Reception ==
Reception

Aggregate score
| Aggregator | Score |
|---|---|
| Metacritic | PC: 80/100; PS4: 83/100; XONE: 84/100; NS: 88/100 |

Review scores
| Publication | Score |
|---|---|
| Eurogamer | Recommended |
| GameSpot | 8/10 |
| IGN | 9/10 |

FAR received "generally favorable" reviews, according to review aggregator website Metacritic.

Writing for Mashable, Anna Washenko named the game as one of her favorites from E3 2016, calling it a "simple but lovely game". After playing the game at GDC 2017, Chris Livingston of PC Gamer described FAR as "one of the most intuitive games" he had played, also praising the visual design and music. On Polygon, Charlie Hall described the game as having "more meaning, conveyed silently, than many major AAA games released so far this year". Kyle Hilliard of Game Informer praised the game's ability to connect the player to their vehicle, the world building, and the puzzles.

GameSpot scored the game 8/10, praising the visual style and ease of play. Edwin Evans-Thirlwell of Eurogamer recommended the game, describing it as an "enormously warm-hearted adventure" and commenting positively on the game's pace and environments. Writing for IGN, Tom Marks described the game's music as "stunning" and "incredible". He noted that Lone Sails was a "gorgeous little game" and "a journey packed full of both stressful and serene moments alike".

The game was a finalist in the Best Student Game category at the 2017 Independent Games Festival. It was also nominated for "Best Visual Design" at the 2018 Golden Joystick Awards, and for "Game, Puzzle" at the National Academy of Video Game Trade Reviewers Awards.

== Sequel ==
A sequel, titled Far: Changing Tides, was announced in June 2021 and released 1 March 2022.
