= F1 Clash =

2019 racing video game

- Developer: Hutch
- Publisher: Hutch
- Platforms: iOS, Android
- Release: WW: 7 May 2019
- Genre: Motor racing management
- Mode: Multiplayer

F1 Manager, rebranded to F1 Clash in May 2021, is a loot box, microtransaction-based racing management/strategy video game developed and published by British video game company Hutch. The game was released for both iOS and Android on 7 May 2019. It featured all the official circuits, teams and drivers from the 2019 Formula One World Championship at launch.

== Gameplay ==
Players take charge of teams as team principals. During races players oversee the strategy of two drivers racing automatically along the tracks, telling drivers when to pit, which tyre compound they should change to, instructing drivers when to drive faster/slower, etc. In-between races players also have the opportunity to upgrade their drivers and various car components such as the engine, brakes, front wing, etc. Disruptive events like weather changes, mechanical failures and Safety Car deployments (e.g. after an accident or a car running out of fuel) can also occur during races.

== Reception ==
Media reception to F1 Clash has been generally positive, Goosed.ie scored the game positively awarding it 4 stars out of 5 whilst also calling the game "A Stupidly Addictive F1 Management Game". They also commented on the in-game microtransactions, stating that whilst their presence might annoy some players, they found them to be after a few weeks gameplay not too much of a restriction.

In their review, Motorsport Magazine, described the game as "an enjoyable first foray into the management genre for F1", whilst commenting both positively and negatively on the multiplayer only aspect of the game. Carscoops commented positively on the game in their quick review, stating that the game was quite enjoyable and possibly addictive. When discussing negative points about the game, Carscoops mention the high device energy consumption and the requirement of a permanent Internet connection.

Android Headlines placed F1 Clash at number 2 in their list of top 8 Best Android Formula 1 Apps & Games – 2019, in the number 1 position was the official Formula 1 Android app.

== Awards and nominations ==
Award	Date	Category	Result	Ref(s)
TIGA Games Industry Awards	November 7, 2019	Best Racing Game	Nominated	
