= F1 Manager 2022 =

2022 video game

- Cover art of the game
- Developer: Frontier Developments
- Publisher: Frontier Developments
- Directors: Andrew Fletcher; Michael Brookes
- Producers: Adam Woods; Eddie Symons; Gary Richards; Stuart Warren
- Designer: Gareth Hughes
- Artists: Nick Rodgers; Sam Denney (art director)
- Composers: Jasper Scholma; Andrew Barnabas; Paul Arnold; Vincent Welch; Ross Fortune; Dan Millidge; Tom Langan; Alex Burnett; J.J. Ipsen; Stefan Almqvist; Brian Tyler
- Series: F1 Manager
- Engine: Unreal Engine 4
- Platforms: PlayStation 4, PlayStation 5, Windows, Xbox One, Xbox Series X/S
- Release: 30 August 2022
- Genre: Racing management
- Mode: Single-player

F1 Manager 2022 is the official racing management simulation game of the 2022 Formula One, Formula 2, and Formula 3 championships by Frontier Developments. It is the first instalment in the F1 Manager series and the first licensed manager game since F1 Manager by EA Sports. The game was released for PlayStation 4, PlayStation 5, Windows, Xbox One, and Xbox Series X/S on 30 August 2022.

== Gameplay ==
As a racing management game, F1 Manager 2022 offers a more detailed career layer in comparison to the My Team mode that Codemasters introduced in F1 2020. The game provides a strategy editor, where player can schedule pit stops, tyres, and pace for each stint. The game features parts development, cost cap, ERS as well as onboard cameras used in real life by Formula One teams. It also features the professional English commentator voices of Karun Chandhok and David Croft, as well as the opening titles for Formula One broadcasts shown after the Frontier Developments logo, while the transitions are recreated while being more faithful to the Formula One broadcasts. The game includes real engineers and drivers from Formula One, Formula 2 and Formula 3. Team radios from real Formula One drivers and race engineers are available as well. Red flags are also featured.

== Development and release ==
F1 Manager 2022 was officially announced in March 2022. It is the first video game in the F1 Manager series, which holds the official license of the Formula One, Formula 2, and Formula 3 championships from 2022 to 2025. It is also the first Formula One licensed management game since F1 Manager of EA Sports in 2000. The game is developed with Unreal Engine 4. It is developed and published by Frontier Developments, a British video game studio who developed Elite Dangerous. The game was released on PlayStation 4, PlayStation 5, Windows, Xbox One, and Xbox Series X/S on 30 August. Players who pre-ordered the game were able to pre-access to the game five days earlier on 25 August. By that October, Frontier Developments ceased development and support just two months after the initial release; this decision to stop development was met with negative reception from players, who had reported bugs in the game, and Frontier decided to backtrack on their previous statement to continue pushing updates for the title.

== Reception ==
Reception

Aggregate score
Aggregator	Score
Metacritic	PC: 79/100; PS5: 74/100; XSXS: 80/100

Review scores
Publication	Score
GameStar	78/100
IGN	8/10
PC Gamer (US)	79/100
PCGamesN	6/10
Push Square	8/10
The Games Machine (Italy)	8.4/10

F1 Manager 2022 received "generally favorable" reviews for Windows and Xbox Series X/S according to review aggregator Metacritic; the PlayStation 5 received "mixed or average" reviews.

It was the fourth best-selling physical-media retail game in the United Kingdom in its week of release. The game sold below Frontier's expectations, selling around 600,000 units by January 2023. Despite the game's underperformance, Frontier reiterated their commitment to the franchise, describing the title as "a good first game in an important new annual franchise".
