= LostWinds 2: Winter of the Melodias =

2009 video game

- Cover art
- Developer: Frontier Developments
- Publisher: Frontier Developments
- Series: LostWinds
- Platforms: iOS, Wii, Microsoft Windows
- Release: Wii: EU: October 9, 2009; NA: October 19, 2009; AU: November 6, 2009; iOS; May 10, 2012; Windows; March 24, 2016
- Genres: Platforming, metroidvania
- Modes: Single-player, multiplayer

LostWinds 2: Winter of the Melodias is a 2009 platform video game developed by Frontier Developments as a sequel to the 2008 game LostWinds.

The game sees the protagonist Toku searching for his missing mother while also trying to uncover the fate of the Melodia people who disappeared from Mistralis years before. The story of the game is self-contained, and as such, having played the first LostWinds game is not necessary to enjoy it.

Square Enix published the Wii version in Japan on December 22, 2009.

== Gameplay ==
The game features the ability to switch between seasons.

Unlike the original title, players are able to switch between seasons, from winter to summer and vice versa, assisting players throughout various puzzles. In addition to this, the game features an in-game map and hint system to prevent players from getting lost. Players are able to swim, break rocks, and use cyclones, amongst other abilities and items obtained throughout the progress of the game, such as a coat. According to Frontier Developments, the non-player characters in LostWinds: Winter of the Melodias were developed to feel more personal than the original title.

== Plot ==
The game begins with a prologue where the player controls Riveren, a Melodia boy tasked with singing at the King's ceremony. While exploring the city of the Melodias, a bridge breaks under Riveren, plummeting him into a cavern, where he finds a stone that is leaking dark magic. The prologue ends with a text box stating "At last, I have found you".

The game then moves its attention to LostWinds protagonist, Toku. During the game's tutorial section, Magmok, the final boss from the original title, assists Toku and Enril up to the Summerfalls mountain. Upon their arrival to the village, it is apparent that the village is locked in eternal winter. Many of the locals have been turned to stone, while others are fearful of the 'monsters' that lurk in the winter. The initial challenge is for the ill-dressed Toku to stay close to any forms of heat in the village to protect himself from the lethal cold. Eventually, high up in the mountains, Toku encounters Riveren, who has become malformed and aggressive from the dark magic that consumes him, and is knocked down into the depths of Summerfall. Toku is rescued by an Eskimo tribe, who provide him with a winter coat, and reunite him with his mother, Magdi.

With new directions, Toku and Enril seek out Sonté, the Spirit of Seasons, in order to end the relentless winter. After completing a quest for him, Sonté imbues Toku with the power to alter the season in Summerfall. The hero subsequently traverses the land, unlocking new wind-based powers for Enril, as well as pages from Magdi's journal with further story exposition. Toku reaches the city of the Melodias to find its inhabitants frozen in time.

Finally, Toku discovers the King of the Melodias, who had been hiding in the snow. Toku escorts the King to the uppermost area of the city, where Riveren appears and attacks him. With the help of the King's special abilities, Toku defeats Riveren and expels the dark magic from his body, which is presumed to be the spirit of Balasar, the primary antagonist of the LostWinds series.

== Development ==
Despite the sequel unofficially being announced after the credits in LostWinds, development was held off due to other company commitments. According to David Braben of Frontier Developments, development for LostWinds: Winter of the Melodias began in April 2009, and took roughly six months to complete. Frontier Developments set aside little over 20 people to work on the project. The goal when developing LostWinds: Winter of the Melodias was to retain the same level of innovation that was evident in the original title, while increasing the play time as a whole, taking length criticism of the original title into consideration. Much like the Metroid series, the game was designed to slowly introduce new powers and abilities to ease the player into the experience.

== Reception ==
Reception

Aggregate score
Aggregator	Score	
Aggregator	iOS	Wii
Metacritic	86/100	86/100

Review scores
Publication	Score	
Publication	iOS	Wii
Destructoid	N/A	9/10
Edge	N/A	8/10
Eurogamer	N/A	9/10
GamePro	N/A	4/5
GameRevolution	N/A	B+
GameSpot	N/A	8/10
Gamezebo	3.5/5	N/A
IGN	N/A	(UK) 9.1/10 (US) 8.9/10
Official Nintendo Magazine	N/A	90%
Pocket Gamer	4.5/5	N/A
TouchArcade	4.5/5	N/A
The A.V. Club	N/A	B+
Teletext GameCentral	N/A	8/10

The Wii and iOS versions received "generally favorable reviews" according to the review aggregation website Metacritic. IGN UK praised the Wii version's challenging puzzles and engaging platforming, saying that "LostWinds: Winter of the Melodias represents an "essential" purchase. Eurogamer was equally impressed, calling it a "tightly designed adventure", comparing the experience to The Legend of Zelda: A Link to the Past.

Although still impressed, Teletext GameCentral said that while the same console version remains a "perfectly crafted experience" the wind controls can become "slightly imprecise" at times.
