= Dog's Life =

2003 video game

- PAL cover art
- Developer: Frontier Developments
- Publishers: EU: Sony Computer Entertainment; NA: Hip Games
- Director: David Braben
- Producer: Jonny Watts
- Designers: David Braben; Jonathan Roach; Jonny Watts
- Writers: Kerry Shale; David Braben; Andrew Gillett
- Composer: Alistair Lindsay
- Platform: PlayStation 2
- Release: EU: 31 October 2003; NA: 24 August 2004
- Genre: Action-adventure
- Mode: Single-player

Dog's Life is an action-adventure video game developed by Frontier Developments and published by Sony Computer Entertainment for the PlayStation 2. It was released in 2003 in Europe and 2004 in North America by Hip Games.

== Gameplay ==
Smellovision mode

The game allows the player to control and interact with over 15 dog breeds, each with distinct traits and abilities. They handle things in different ways that can also be used in various challenges or puzzles.

The game is divided into three areas: Clarksville, a rural town; Lake Minniwahwah, a ski resort; and Boom City. These are then divided into smaller areas such as districts or farms. Humans willing to give missions in exchange for bones populate every area. Bones can also be found buried underground or hiding elsewhere. Bones are used to increase your stats, which will make it easier to complete missions.

Certain smells picked up through the game's "Smellovision" will activate challenges against a local dog. In each small section of the game there are four challenges, two of which are to find eight smells of the same colour and compete against a local dog. These missions include races, obedience trials, tug-of-war games and a territorial game where the player must run around urinating in marked areas to obtain territory.

There are also salons in some levels where Jake can get his coat cleaned and brushed. He also gains a shiny new collar with a silver 'J' at the front.

Once these dogs are beaten, the player is able to take control of that dog and use their special abilities to find other bones. Other challenges include scent-collecting challenges, and a minigame called "Doggy Do", where the player must copy the moves of the local dog. There are also dangers in certain areas, such as the dog catcher and his Doberman. The player must also keep Jake healthy by feeding him, allowing him to defecate and coaxing people into giving him snacks by growling, barking, or performing tricks unlocked by doing the obedience trials. Jake is able to do a range of tricks including begging, sitting, lying down and marking his territory.

Jake can interact with the game’s many characters in various ways, such as: chasing, shaking and throwing chickens, stealing sausages, and shaking kittens.

== Plot ==
Jake at the Farmhouse area in Clarksville.

The game opens in Clarksville, a small town located in the American countryside. Jake, a flatulent American Foxhound, witnesses Daisy, a Labrador Retriever whom he has a crush on, being taken away by dog catchers and resolves to rescue her. Using information gained from overhearing conversations between humans, he tracks the dog catchers from Clarksville to the Lake Minniwahwah mountain resort, and finally to Boom City. Throughout his adventure, he is continually harassed by Killer, a Dobermann belonging to one of the dog catchers.

Eventually it is revealed that Miss Peaches, head of a cat food company, is arranging for dogs to be caught and smuggled to a factory where they will be made into her cat food. Jake ultimately makes it to the dog pound, and after rescuing a number of dogs and bribing Killer with bones, gains entry to the factory. There, he manages to prevent Daisy from being killed by the machinery as she is taken through it on a conveyor belt, only for Miss Peaches to appear with a shotgun. Jake farts, sending her falling onto the conveyor belt, killing her and turning her into cat food.

The epilogue reveals that all the stolen dogs were saved and that Jake and Daisy are together.

== Reception ==
Reception

Aggregate scores
Aggregator	Score
GameRankings	71%
Metacritic	64/100

Review scores
Publication	Score
Edge	5/10
Eurogamer	6/10
Famitsu	28/40
Game Informer	7/10
GameSpot	7/10
GameSpy	3/5
GameZone	9/10
IGN	7/10
Official U.S. PlayStation Magazine	2/5
PlayStation: The Official Magazine	7/10
The New York Times	(average)

Dog's Life received "mixed or average" reviews according to video game review aggregator Metacritic.

Eurogamer found the game amusing, but felt that it offered little for experienced gamers, being aimed at a younger audience. They praised the game's "warm sense of humour" and "cute visuals" and found the idea of controlling a dog to be "actually quite cool". Although GameSpot called the game charming and entertaining, they said that there is not much to do in the game, other than playing and controlling the dogs. GameSpy called it "a nice change of pace" but found the game bland and considered it to be aimed more at younger children than teenagers. IGN called the gameplay "simple and well-executed", but noted that the visuals "look like the game was ripped from a PSone title" and that the audio seemed "all over the place". Charles Herold of The New York Times called the game fun but forgettable. In Japan, Famitsu gave it a score of one eight, one six, and two sevens, for a total of 28 out of 40.

According to the Guinness World Records Gamer's Edition 2009, Dog's Life holds the world record for the most video game voice-overs recorded by one person in a game. Kerry Shale voiced 39 characters from the game.
