= Kai Ebel =

German sports journalist

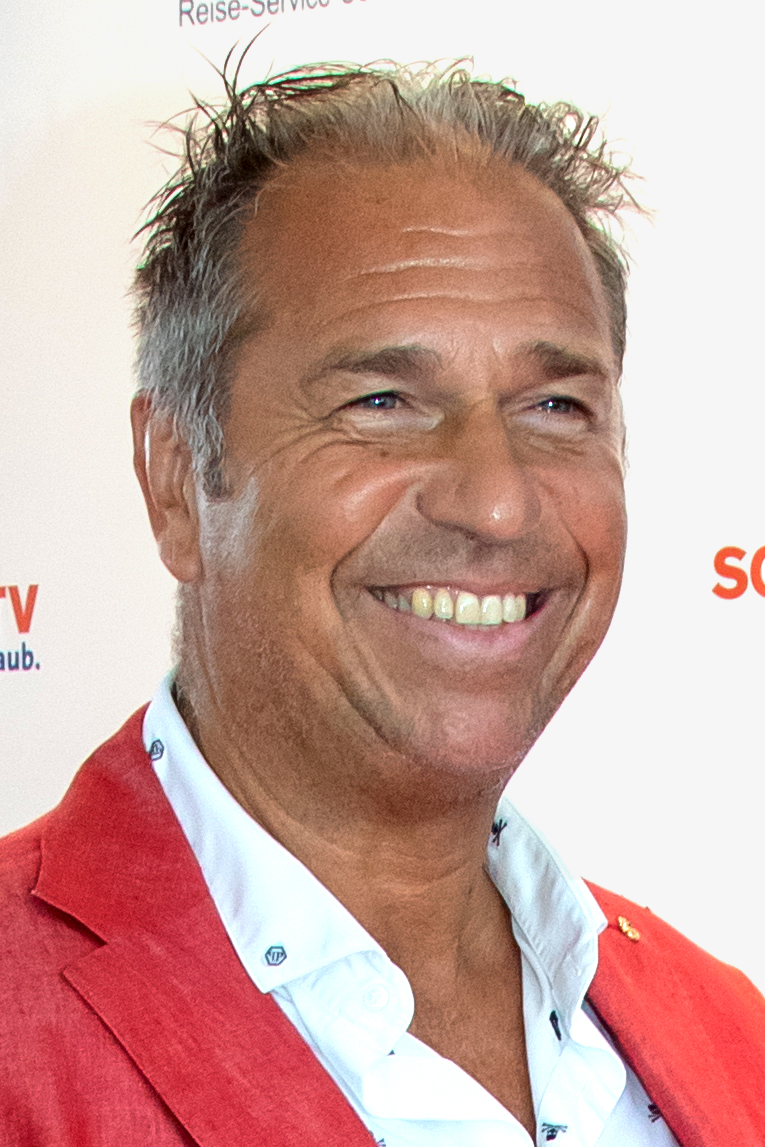
- Ebel in 2021
- Born: 30 August 1964 (age 62)
- Education: German Sport University Cologne
- Occupation: Sports commentator
- Years active: 1992–present
- Employer: RTL
- Spouse: Mila Wiegand (m. 2009)

Kai Ebel (born 30 August 1964) is a German sports journalist. He has worked RTL television channel Formula One broadcast commentator and editor since 1992. He made his debut in 1992 Spanish Grand Prix.

After graduating from high school in Mönchengladbach, Ebel completed his military service and then studied at the German Sport University in Cologne, where he graduated as a sports teacher.

At the end of July 2009, after seven years of partnership, Ebel married the native Romanian painter Mila Wiegand, born as Monica Dragomirescu (born 18 January 1972).
