= Thrillville =

2006 video game

- European cover art
- Developer: Frontier Developments
- Publishers: NA: LucasArts; EU: Atari
- Composers: Alistair Lindsay; David Collins; Jesse Harlin
- Platforms: PlayStation 2, PlayStation Portable, Xbox
- Release: NA: November 21, 2006; PAL: December 1, 2006 (PS2); AU: February 2, 2007 (PSP); EU: February 9, 2007 (PSP)
- Genre: Management simulator
- Modes: Single-player, Multiplayer

Thrillville is a simulation and strategy video game developed by Frontier Developments that depicts theme park management, similar to RollerCoaster Tycoon. Thrillville is available for PlayStation 2, PlayStation Portable and, in North America, Xbox.

The original Xbox version of Thrillville was made backwards compatible on Xbox One and Xbox Series X/S on November 15, 2021.

The PlayStation Portable version of the game was made available on PlayStation Store for the PlayStation 4 and the PlayStation 5 on December 19, 2023.

== Plot ==
The player receives a voice message from their Uncle Mortimer (Brian Greene), an eccentric inventor and theme park owner with a voice and personality similar to Doc Emmett Brown, who has reviewed the player's roller coaster designs. Enamored with the designs, he tasks the player with managing his theme park, Thrillville. Later, billionaire Vernon Garrison enters the theme park market with his Globo-Joy brand, serving as the player's rival for the rest of the game. The player is then assigned to manage Thrillville Timewarp, a park with many rides and attractions that are old or broken down. Additionally, it is revealed that Garrison has sabotaged the park. Once the park is restored, the player is sent to manage Thrillville Paradise, where Globo-Joy is using bugs for the purpose of corporate espionage, so as to steal Mortimer's ideas. With the bugs discovered, Mortimer decides to design a fake flea-themed park in order to trick Garrison into thinking it's for real and stealing it. Meanwhile, the player has to manage Thrillville Adventures to counter the increasing popularity of Globo-Joy parks. Finally, Garrison falls for Mortimer's trick and opens Lice Land, whose catastrophic failure leads Garrison to file for bankruptcy. To add insult to injury, Mortimer files a four billion dollar lawsuit against him for intellectual property theft. The player is then given access to Treasures of Thrillville, the fifth and final park while Mortimer accepts a post as a professor at a prestigious university in England.

== Gameplay ==
The concept of the game is to design and build a theme park that will satisfy tourists looking for a thrill. Park guests must be kept happy by use of roller coasters and race tracks, carnival rides, and games like bumper cars and arcade games. In party play mode, players can play all the minigames available against the computer or friends. The player can build facilities that would be available in amusement parks, such as bathrooms, food stalls, drink stalls, and even hat and balloon stalls. The player may also talk and interact with their guests to become friends. If using a teen character, the player may also flirt with the opposite sex. The player can play minigames to gain money, make loans, and hire staff to clean, entertain, and fix rides. Keeping park guests happy will increase publicity and money.

The game provides missions to the players, divided into five categories: upkeep, which involves taking control of staff to keep the park in working order; build, which involves building and upgrading attractions; games, which involves playing and winning games throughout the park; business, which involves managing the park's finances, advertisement campaigns, etc.; and guests, which involves interacting with the park's guests. After completing enough missions, the player is allowed to move onto another theme park.

There are five parks in total: Thrillville, Thrillville Timewarp, Thrillville Paradise, Thrillville Adventures, and Treasures of Thrillville; each park is divided into three sections with their own unique theme.

== Development ==
The game was announced by Frontier on June 5, 2006, where they confirmed they would self-publish the game in Europe and Asia, while LucasArts would publish in North America. On June 8, Atari announced they would distribute the game in the former two territories. (Note: Although announcements say that Atari would only distribute, Atari are listed as the publisher on the packaging for both versions.) Despite this, a German advertisment for the game listed on the back cover of the manual for the Xbox version of Lego Star Wars II: The Original Trilogy lists LucasArts as publisher.

== Reception ==
Reception

Aggregate score
Aggregator	Score		
Aggregator	PS2	PSP	Xbox
Metacritic	69/100	72/100	71/100

Review scores
Publication	Score		
Publication	PS2	PSP	Xbox
Edge	7/10	N/A	N/A
Electronic Gaming Monthly	4.5/10	N/A	4.5/10
Eurogamer	6/10	N/A	N/A
Game Informer	7.75/10	N/A	7.75/10
GamePro	2.5/5	N/A	2.5/5
GameRevolution	B	N/A	B
GameSpot	7.6/10	7.7/10	7.7/10
GameSpy	3.5/5	3.5/5	3.5/5
GameZone	7.9/10	7.9/10	8.1/10
IGN	7.5/10	7.5/10	7.5/10
Official U.S. PlayStation Magazine	7/10	7/10	N/A
Official Xbox Magazine (US)	N/A	N/A	8/10
The A.V. Club	B	N/A	B
The Times	3/5	3/5	N/A

The game received "average" reviews on all platforms according to the review aggregation website Metacritic.

The A.V. Club gave the PlayStation 2 and Xbox versions a B, saying: "You'll be extremely busy when you get started. Luckily, the game is forgiving, so you don't have to worry about going out of business if you'd rather go off and train cheerleaders. It's your park; have fun with it." However, The Times gave the PS2 and PSP versions three stars out of five, saying: "There is plenty to do in the management of the park and great rewards for success. However, all this is undermined because it is much more fun to play one of the driving, mini-golf, shooting or football games than do all the menial things." The Sydney Morning Herald gave the PS2 version two stars out of five, saying that "A trip to Thrillville takes you on a long, unnecessary detour through Dullsville."

== Sequel ==
A sequel, Thrillville: Off the Rails, was released on October 16, 2007, for PSP, Wii, Microsoft Windows, PlayStation 2, Xbox 360, and Nintendo DS.

Frontier Developments returned to create Off the Rails for all mentioned platforms, except for the DS version, which was developed by DC Studios instead. The game features over 20 rides and over 30 minigames, as well as new types of coasters called Whoa! Coasters.

Frontier Developments continued their development of theme park management games with the release of Planet Coaster in 2016.
