= Frontier Developments =

British video game studio (founded 1994)

Frontier Developments plc
- Formerly: Frontier Developments Limited (1994–2013)
- Type: Public limited company
- Traded as: AIM: FDEV
- ISIN: GB00BBT32N39
- Industry: Video games
- Founded: 28 January 1994; 32 years ago
- Founder: David Braben
- Headquarters: Cambridge Science Park, Cambridge, England
- Key people: Jo Cooke (CEO); David Braben (President & Founder); Ilse Howling (Non-Executive Director and Chairman)
- Products: Elite Dangerous; RollerCoaster Tycoon; LostWinds; Planet Coaster; Jurassic World Evolution; Planet Zoo; F1 Manager
- Revenue: ▲£90.6 million (2025)
- Operating income: ▲£12.7 million (2025)
- Net income: ▲£16.4 million (2025)
- Number of employees: 696 (2025)
- Subsidiaries: Complex Games
- Website: www.frontier.co.uk

Frontier Developments plc is a British video game developer founded by David Braben in January 1994 and based at the Cambridge Science Park in Cambridge, England. Frontier develops the construction management simulators Planet Coaster and Planet Zoo, and has produced several games in David Braben's Elite series, including Elite Dangerous. The company takes its name from the earliest titles in the Elite series with which it was involved, a port of Frontier: Elite II and development of Frontier: First Encounters. In 2013, the company was listed on the AIM segment of the London Stock Exchange. It published third-party games under the Frontier Foundry label between 2019 and 2022. In December 2025, Jo Cooke became the company's current CEO. Cooke returned to Frontier as Chief Marketing Officer in August 2025, having previously worked at Frontier as Marketing and Publishing Director as the studio began self-publishing games, overseeing the launches of Elite Dangerous and Planet Coaster.

== History ==
Frontier Developments' first game was the 1993 Amiga CD32 port of Frontier: Elite II, followed by Frontier: First Encounters in 1995, these being the first and second sequels to the 1984 game Elite by Acornsoft. David Braben owned all rights to Elite assigned to the company in 2008.

Between 2005 and 2011, Frontier developed The Outsider, an action-adventure game set in Washington DC that Braben said would advance video game storytelling. The Outsider was cancelled in January 2011 after it was dropped by the publisher, Codemasters, leading to nearly 30 staff layoffs.

Frontier had been planning a new Elite sequel, under the working title Elite 4, since 1998. The company completed a successful Kickstarter campaign at the end of 2012, where the new sequel's name Elite: Dangerous was revealed. Early-access versions of the game have been playable by backers since December 2013. The full game was released to PC on 16 December 2014.

Frontier Developments has made many other games, including Dog's Life, Thrillville, and RollerCoaster Tycoon 3. The company also made games for the Wallace and Gromit franchise, and has released Wallace & Gromit in Project Zoo, and a tie-in game for Wallace & Gromit: The Curse of the Were-Rabbit. In 2008, Frontier released LostWinds, a launch title for Nintendo's WiiWare platform. It was followed up with a sequel in 2009, entitled LostWinds: Winter of the Melodias. In 2010, Frontier developed Kinectimals for Microsoft's Kinect controller on the Xbox 360. In 2011 Kinect Disneyland Adventures and Kinectimals: Now With Bears were developed, along with ports of LostWinds for iOS and Kinectimals for iOS and Windows Phone. In 2012, Frontier released Coaster Crazy, and started to work on Elite: Dangerous Kickstarter, which successfully closed at the start of 2013. In 2013, Frontier released Xbox One and Xbox 360 exclusive Zoo Tycoon, published by Microsoft Studios, and launched backers alpha for Elite: Dangerous in December. In 2015 the company released Screamride, a theme park construction and management simulation game for the Xbox 360 and Xbox One. The company has recently released Planet Coaster, a construction and management simulation video game similar to the RollerCoaster Tycoon franchise. The game is the second major self-published franchises from Frontier along with the Elite series. Frontier announced that it will begin self-publishing all its future games, starting with Planet Coaster.

Frontier opened a North American studio in August 2012 in Halifax, Nova Scotia, Canada under the name Frontier Developments Inc. and headed by David Walsh. It closed in January 2015.

On 3 January 2017 TMZ reported that the company sued Atari for not paying the company enough for royalties for its game RollerCoaster Tycoon 3; Frontier reported that it only received $1.17 million when they needed $3.37 million. David Walsh confirmed the report in a GameSpot interview, stating that it had previously attempted to resolve the issue without legal action since April 2016. On 6 February 2017 Frontier announced that it had acquired licensing rights from Universal Pictures to be used in its third self-published title, an "enduring movie franchise of global renown". This was later announced to be Jurassic World Evolution, which released on 12 June 2018. On 26 July 2017 the company announced Frontier Expo 2017, a press and community event focusing on Elite: Dangerous, Planet Coaster, and Jurassic World Evolution. The event took place on 7 October 2017 at the Queen Elizabeth Olympic Park, London, UK. In July 2017, Tencent, a Chinese investment company, bought a 9% share in the company.

On 10 March 2020, Frontier announced that it had signed an agreement with Formula One to develop and release several management simulation games based on the F1 license. In this agreement, Frontier will release four games, starting from F1 Manager 2022 in 2022. On 10 June 2021, Frontier announced Jurassic World Evolution 2 a sequel to its 2018 park builder game would be releasing in late 2021. On 10 Mar 2022, Frontier announced they were cancelling all development of their latest version of Elite Dangerous, Odyssey, on consoles.

On 10 August 2022, Frontier announced David Braben was to step down from the position of CEO and take on a newly established executive role of President and Founder. Jonny Watts who has been with the company for 24 years, the last decade of which in the position of Chief Creative Officer was to become the new CEO. The changes were effective immediately. It was also announced that David Gammon would be retiring from his role as Chairman in December 2022 and David Wilton would take on this role at that time. On 2 November 2022, Frontier announced that it had completed an acquisition of Complex Games following on from the success of Warhammer 40,000: Chaos Gate – Daemonhunters which was published under the Frontier Foundry label six months prior.

On 17 October 2023, Frontier announced it would lay off an ‘unknown number of staff’ in an organisational review.

On 12 May 2026, Frontier increased their revenue and profit expectations for FY26, citing that cumulative revenue for "Jurassic World Evolution 3 is ahead of Jurassic World Evolution 2 over an equivalent post-launch period"

In September 2026, Frontier announced a partnership with Disney to create a new game based on Disney's intellectual properties. CEO Jo Cooke added that the partnership will "further reinforce" Frontier's strategy of creating "creative management simulation game franchises". The company will fully fund and publish the title.

== Publishing ==
In June 2019, Frontier announced that it would begin publishing games from third-party developers under a new label named Frontier Publishing. At Gamescom 2020, Frontier announced that its publishing label would be renamed to "Frontier Foundry", and that it would publish Struggling from Chasing Rats in 2020, and Lemnis Gate from Ratloop Games in 2021. They would also publish an upcoming project from Haemimont Games. This game was revealed to be named Stranded: Alien Dawn which initially released as an Early Access title on Steam in October 2022, with a full release anticipated during 2023.

On 13 June 2021, Frontier announced Lemnis Gate would be released on 3 August 2021 with an open beta being scheduled for July 2021. On 3 June 2021 during the Games Workshop Warhammer Skulls event, Frontier announced it would be publishing a reboot to the 1998 turn based game Warhammer 40,000: Chaos Gate named Warhammer 40,000: Chaos Gate – Daemonhunters. The reboot is to be developed by Canadian developer Complex Games and published under the Frontier Foundry label. It is set to release in 2022.

Additionally Frontier announced a sequel to FAR: Lone Sails named FAR: Changing Tides, developed by Okomotive and published under the Frontier Foundry label. The game was released in March 2022. Deliver Us Mars, set ten years after the events of Deliver Us The Moon, was announced as part of the Future Games Show Spring Showcase on March 24, 2022. It features a new protagonist who reactivates her companion robot after an apparent ship crash on the planet of Mars. Deliver Us Mars is set to launch on both Epic Games Store and Steam PC storefronts, as well as Xbox Series X|S, Xbox One, PS5, and PS4 consoles. The Great War: Western Front, a Real Time Strategy game developed by Petroglyph Games was announced as part of the Future Games Show during Gamescom on August 24, 2022. It launched on the Epic Games Store and Steam PC storefronts in March 2023.

On 14 June 2023 it was announced that a review into the performance of Frontier Foundry concluded to cease all future third party publishing efforts due to disappointing financial performance, with most games releasing under the label failing to become profitable within one year of release. It was stated that games already released would continue to be supported but no further games would release under the label. Instead future funding that was to be allocated for this purpose would be diverted to producing games internally.

Frontier released Warhammer Age of Sigmar: Realms of Ruin on November 17, 2023. Realms of Ruin flopped with a drop in concurrent players and lackluster sales. Frontier shares plunged 20%. Attempts to widen their game portfolio didn't achieve the anticipated success in the past 5 years. Frontier stated it will refocus on creative management simulation (CMS) games.

On 15 March 2024, Frontier announced that the publishing rights to RollerCoaster Tycoon 3 would be sold back to Atari, Inc. This was confirmed by its parent Atari SA on 2 April.

== Technology ==
=== Cobra engine ===
Frontier began development of an in house game engine in 1988.

Cobra uses C++ as the programming language. The development tools are created with C# / WPF / Forms and C++. Lua is used for gameplay features. It supports many platforms such as Microsoft Windows, Xbox One, PlayStation 4, iOS and Android devices. It supports cross-platform by allowing code and resources on PC to be compiled and run on other platforms. The game code and resources are isolated from the hardware by a common platform-neutral core API. It enables optimal use of a multi-processor, multi-threaded environment. There is a framework for rapid development of tools to view, tweak and review changes to resources on platforms in live sessions. The 4th generation of Cobra has cloud-based analytics for data-driven games. The proprietary tools, tech and pluggable modules enable the development a wide variety of games on tablets, smartphones, PC and consoles without making employees unable to contribute.

== Games ==
=== Games developed ===
Year	Title	Publisher(s)	Platform(s)
1995	Frontier: First Encounters	GameTek	MS-DOS, Windows, Classic Mac OS, Linux
1996	Darxide	Sega	32X
1998	V2000	Grolier Interactive	Windows, PlayStation
2000	Infestation	Ubisoft	Windows, PlayStation
2003	Darxide EMP	Frontier Developments	Pocket PC
2003	RollerCoaster Tycoon (Xbox port)	Infogrames	Xbox
2003	Wallace & Gromit in Project Zoo	BAM! Entertainment	Windows, Xbox, PlayStation 2, GameCube
2003	Dog's Life	Sony Computer Entertainment	PlayStation 2
2003	RollerCoaster Tycoon 2: Wacky Worlds	Infogrames	Windows
2003	RollerCoaster Tycoon 2: Time Twister	Atari Interactive	Windows
2004	RollerCoaster Tycoon 3	Atari Interactive (PC), Frontier Developments (iOS)	Windows, OS X, iOS
2005	RollerCoaster Tycoon 3: Soaked!	Atari Interactive	Windows, OS X
2005	RollerCoaster Tycoon 3: Wild!	Atari Interactive	Windows, OS X
2005	Wallace & Gromit: The Curse of the Were-Rabbit	Konami	PlayStation 2, Xbox
2006	Thrillville	LucasArts; Atari Europe	PlayStation 2, Xbox, PlayStation Portable
2007	Thrillville: Off the Rails	LucasArts	PlayStation 2, Xbox 360, PlayStation Portable, Nintendo DS, Wii, Windows
2008	LostWinds	Frontier Developments	iOS, Wii, Windows
2009	LostWinds 2: Winter of the Melodias	Frontier Developments	iOS, Wii, Windows
2010	Kinectimals	Microsoft Game Studios	Xbox 360, Windows Phone, iOS, Android
2011	Kinectimals: Now with Bears!	Microsoft Studios	Xbox 360, Windows Phone, iOS, Android
2011	Kinect: Disneyland Adventures	Microsoft Studios	Xbox 360
2012	Coaster Crazy	Frontier Developments	iOS
2013	Zoo Tycoon	Microsoft Studios	Xbox 360, Xbox One
2013	Coaster Crazy Deluxe	Frontier Developments	Wii U, iOS
2014	Tales from Deep Space	Amazon Game Studios	Fire OS, iOS
2014	Elite: Dangerous	Frontier Developments	Windows, OS X, PlayStation 4, Xbox One
2015	Screamride	Microsoft Studios	Xbox 360, Xbox One
2015	Elite Dangerous: Horizons	Frontier Developments	Windows, Xbox One, PlayStation 4
2016	Elite Dangerous: Arena	Frontier Developments	Windows, Xbox One
2016	Planet Coaster	Frontier Developments	Windows, macOS, PlayStation 4, Xbox One, PlayStation 5, Xbox Series X/S
2018	Jurassic World Evolution	Frontier Developments	Windows, PlayStation 4, Xbox One, Nintendo Switch
2019	Planet Zoo	Frontier Developments	Windows, PlayStation 5, Xbox Series X/S
2021	Elite Dangerous: Odyssey	Frontier Developments	Windows, PlayStation 5, Xbox Series X/S
2021	Jurassic World Evolution 2	Frontier Developments	Windows, PlayStation 4, Xbox One, PlayStation 5, Xbox Series X/S
2022	F1 Manager 2022	Frontier Developments	Windows, PlayStation 4, Xbox One, PlayStation 5, Xbox Series X/S
2023	F1 Manager 2023	Frontier Developments	Windows, PlayStation 4, Xbox One, PlayStation 5, Xbox Series X/S
2023	Warhammer Age of Sigmar: Realms of Ruin	Frontier Developments	Windows, PlayStation 5, Xbox Series X/S
2024	F1 Manager 2024	Frontier Developments	Windows, Nintendo Switch, PlayStation 4, Xbox One, PlayStation 5, Xbox Series X/S
2024	Planet Coaster 2	Frontier Developments	Windows, PlayStation 5, Xbox Series X/S
2025	Jurassic World Evolution 3	Frontier Developments	Windows, PlayStation 5, Xbox Series X/S
2026	Planet Zoo 2	Frontier Developments	Windows, PlayStation 5, Xbox Series X/S

=== Games published ===
Year	Title	Developer(s)	Platform(s)
2020	Struggling	Chasing Rats Games	Windows, Nintendo Switch, PlayStation 4, Xbox One
2020	RollerCoaster Tycoon 3: Complete Edition	Frontier Developments	Windows, Nintendo Switch
2021	Lemnis Gate	Ratloop Games Canada	Windows, PlayStation 4, Xbox One, PlayStation 5, Xbox Series X/S
2022	FAR: Changing Tides	Okomotive	Windows, PlayStation 4, Xbox One, PlayStation 5, Xbox Series X/S, Nintendo Switch
2022	Warhammer 40,000: Chaos Gate – Daemonhunters	Complex Games	Windows, PlayStation 4, Xbox One, PlayStation 5, Xbox Series X/S
2023	Stranded: Alien Dawn	Haemimont Games	Windows, PlayStation 4, Xbox One, PlayStation 5, Xbox Series X/S
2023	Deliver Us Mars	KeokeN Interactive	Windows, PlayStation 4, Xbox One, PlayStation 5, Xbox Series X/S
2023	The Great War: Western Front	Petroglyph Games	Windows
2026	Warhammer 40,000: Chaos Gate – Deathwatch	Complex Games	Windows, PlayStation 5, Xbox Series X/S
