= Holo =

Holo may refer to:

- Holo, the theme formerly recommended by Google for the design of Android apps, introduced with Android version 4.0
- holo, the codename of SteamOS 3.0
- Hölö, a village in Södertälje Municipality, Sweden
- Hoklo people (also spelled Hō-ló or Holo), a Han ethnic group whose traditional homeland is in South China
  - Holo or Hoklo the varieties in the Min Nan family of Chinese spoken by the Hoklo people
- Théodore Holo (b. 1948), Beninese politician and foreign minister of Benin from 1991 to 1992
- Holo-Man, fictional American superhero who starred in a 1978 single-issue comic book about holography, The Amazing Adventures of Holo-Man
- Holo (Spice and Wolf), the main female heroine of the Spice and Wolf light novel series
- Holo-Me, the name of the character customisation process in the video game Elite: Dangerous
- HOLO card, a public transit smart card used in Honolulu, Hawaiʻi
- Hololive Production, VTuber agency

== See also ==
- Holos (disambiguation)
- Holocaust
- Holocene
- Holodomor
- Holography (disambiguation)
- Holon (disambiguation)
- Holotype, biological type
- Holism
- Rolo
- Solo (disambiguation)
