= Holonomic =

Holonomic (introduced by Heinrich Hertz in 1894 from the Greek ὅλος meaning "whole", "entire" and νόμος meaning "law") may refer to:

== Mathematics ==
- Holonomic basis, a set of basis vector fields {e_{k}} such that some coordinate system {x^{k}} exists for which $e_k = {\partial \over \partial x^k}$
- Holonomic constraints, which are expressible as a function of the coordinates $x_j\,\!$ and time $t\,\!$
- Holonomic module in the theory of D-modules
- Holonomic function, a smooth function that is a solution of a linear homogeneous differential equation with polynomial coefficients

== Other uses ==
- Holonomic brain theory, model of cognitive function as being guided by a matrix of neurological wave interference patterns

== See also ==
- Holonomy in differential geometry
- Holon (disambiguation)
- Nonholonomic system, in physics, a system whose state depends on the path taken in order to achieve it
