= Elite Plus =

1991 video game

- Developer: Microplay Software
- Publisher: Microplay Software
- Programmer: Chris Sawyer
- Series: Elite
- Platforms: MS-DOS, PC-98
- Release: April 17, 1991: MS-DOS; 1992: PC-98

Elite Plus is a remake of the 1987 MS-DOS conversion of Elite, programmed by Chris Sawyer and published in 1991 by Microplay Software. Whereas the original Elite (1987) for the PC used CGA graphics, Elite Plus was upgraded to take advantage of EGA, VGA and MCGA.

A port to the PC-98 was released in 1992.

== Gameplay ==
The player starts out with the Cobra Mark III craft, and must advance to the reach the Elite craft and status level.

== Development ==
Elite Plus was coded in assembly language by Chris Sawyer, who later wrote RollerCoaster Tycoon.

== Reception ==
Stanley Trevena reviewed the game for Computer Gaming World, and stated that "Players of the original game may find it enjoyable to take a trip down memory lane with this new version of their old favorite, but most gamers probably won't have the time or space for this program in their software collection. Like the heated debate that surrounds the colorization of classic films, some classics are best left in their original form and not artificially modernized."

Computer Gaming World gave Elite Plus two-plus stars, describing it as "More detailed and complex, it is also more tedious than the original". A 1994 survey of strategic space games set in the year 2000 and later gave Elite Plus two-plus stars.

In 1991, PC Format placed Elite Plus on its list of the 50 best computer games of all time. The editors called it "a classic game that mixes solid 3D space combat with trading to create a universe in which you can spend many a happy half-hour bushwhacking the dastardly Thargoids."

== Reviews ==
- PC Format - Dec, 1995
- ASM (Aktueller Software Markt) - Jun, 1991
