= David Lowe (video game composer) =

British musician, engineer and composer

David Lowe, also known as "Uncle Art", is a British composer known for his work on computer games from 1985 to 1998.

Lowe gained attention by making music with professional synthesizers (CX5, DX7, RX11 drum machine) for an additional cassette tape distributed with the games Starglider 2 and Carrier Command.

His Starglider soundtrack for 16-bit computers (Atari ST and Amiga) was notable for having a 15-second song (a single sound file) with vocals and synthesizers on both versions. The Amiga version's title music used high-quality instrument sounds before tracker music.

Lowe composed and recorded the music for Frontier: Elite II.

Lowe was also co-author and assembler programmer for 'Buggy Blast' and also programmer for the Spectrum Z80 version of 'Thrust': both published by Rainbird 1985 & 1986 respectively. In 2017, Lowe and his daughter finished their latest album; A Temporal Shift. It features remastered versions of some of Lowe's best-known gaming tunes.

== Games ==
- Buggy Blast (1985, ZX Spectrum)
- Rasputin (1986, ZX Spectrum)
- Rad-Zone (1986, Amstrad CPC)
- Thrust (1986, ZX Spectrum)
- Starglider (1987, Atari ST, Amiga, ZX Spectrum)
- Carrier Command (1988, ZX Spectrum, Amstrad CPC, audio tape music)
- Exceleron (1988, Commodore 64)
- Games, The: Summer Edition (Go For Gold) (1988, Amiga, Atari ST)
- Galaxy Force (1988, Amiga, Atari ST)
- Starglider 2 (1988, Amiga, audio tape music)
- International Karate + (1988, Amiga, Atari ST) (Based on Rob Hubbard's original for the Commodore 64)
- After Burner II (1988, Amiga, Atari ST arranged from the arcade game)
- P47 Thunderbolt (1988, Commodore 64)
- Xain'd Sleena a.k.a. Soldier of Light (1988, Amiga)
- Altered Beast (1989, Amiga, Atari ST)
- Bangkok Knights (1989, Amiga, Atari ST)
- Darius+ (1989, Amiga, Atari ST)
- Double Dragon II (1989, Commodore 64)
- F-15 Strike Eagle II (1989, Amiga, Atari ST)
- Garfield: A Winter's Tail (1989, Commodore 64, Amiga, Atari ST)
- Hard Drivin' (1989, Commodore 64)
- Power Drift (1989, ZX Spectrum, Amstrad CPC, MSX, Commodore 64, Amiga, Atari ST)
- Raffles (Devon Aire in the Hidden Diamond Caper) / (Inside Outing) (1989, Amiga, Atari ST)
- Time Scanner (1989, Amiga, Atari ST)
- ISS: Incredible Shrinking Sphere (1989, Amiga)
- Betrayal (1990, Commodore 64, Amiga, Atari ST)
- Ghostbusters II (1990, Amiga, Atari ST)
- Line of Fire (1990, Commodore 64, Amiga, Amstrad CPC, Atari ST, ZX Spectrum)
- Night Shift (1990, Commodore 64, Amiga, Amstrad CPC, Atari ST, ZX Spectrum)
- Railroad Tycoon (1990, Amiga, Atari ST)
- Turbo Outrun (1990, home ports, credited as "Uncle Art")
- Black Hornet (1991, Amiga, Atari ST)
- Cyber Police ESWAT (1991, ZX Spectrum, Commodore 64, Amiga, Atari ST)
- Elite Plus (1991, MS-DOS)
- Final Fight (1991, Amstrad CPC, Atari ST, Commodore 64, ZX Spectrum) (based on original by Yoko Shimomura)
- Midwinter II: Flames of Freedom (1991, Amiga, Atari ST)
- Formula One Grand Prix (1992, Amiga, Atari ST)
- Pinball Dreams (1992, MS-DOS, based on original by Olof Gustafsson)
- Street Fighter II (1992, Commodore 64, Amiga, Atari ST, ZX Spectrum) (based on original by Yoko Shimomura)
- Frontier: Elite II (1993, Amiga, Atari ST)
- Cybermorph (1993, Jaguar)
- PGA Tour Golf & PGA Tour Golf II (1993, Game Gear)
- Beneath a Steel Sky (1994, Amiga, CD32)
- The Misadventures of Flink (1994, Mega Drive) (based on original by Matthias Steinwachs)
- Frontier: First Encounters (1995, MS-DOS)
