= Elite (video game series) =

- Genres: Space trading and combat simulator, online space flight simulator
- Developers: David Braben, Ian Bell, Chris Sawyer, Frontier Developments, Microplay Software
- Publishers: Acornsoft (Acorn/BBC), Firebird (ports), Imagineer, GameTek, Konami, Frontier Developments
- First release: Elite; 1984
- Latest release: Elite Dangerous; 2014

Elite is a space trading and combat simulation video game series created by David Braben and Ian Bell in 1984. The Elite series has been innovative, genre-defining, and the longest running space sim series in history. It was met with commercial success, favorable reviews, and near-universal acclaim.

== Releases ==
Release timeline
1984	Elite
1985–1990
1991	Elite Plus
1992
1993	Frontier: Elite II
1994
1995	Frontier: First Encounters
1996–2013
2014	Elite Dangerous
2015	Elite Dangerous: Horizons
2016	Elite Dangerous: Arena
2017–2020
2021	Elite Dangerous: Odyssey

Year	Title	Platform(s)		
Year	Title	Console	Computer	Handheld
Main series
1984	Elite	NES (PAL regions only)	BBC Micro; Acorn Electron; Apple II; Amstrad CPC; Commodore 64; ZX Spectrum; MSX; Tatung Einstein; IBM PC compatible; Acorn Archimedes	-
1991	Elite Plus	-	MS-DOS	-
1993	Frontier: Elite II	-	Amiga; CD32; Atari ST; MS-DOS	-
1995	Frontier: First Encounters	-	Windows; Mac; MS-DOS; Linux	-
2014	Elite Dangerous	PlayStation 4; Xbox One	Windows	-
Expansion packs
2015	Elite Dangerous: Horizons	PlayStation 4; Xbox One	Windows	-
2021	Elite Dangerous: Odyssey	-	Windows	-
Spin-offs
2016	Elite Dangerous: Arena	Xbox One	Windows	-

== Main series ==
=== Elite ===
The first game in the series is Elite, made by Braben and Bell. It was published by Acornsoft (Acorn/BBC), Firebird (ports) and Imagineer in 1984. Elite was one of the first home computer games to use wire-frame 3D graphics with hidden line removal and twitch gameplay. Elite: The Dark Wheel by Robert Holdstock was the first ever novella to be included for distribution with a video game. Elite is considered a classic and genre maker in gaming history for its then revolutionary game engine with 3D graphics and open-ended game model. Due to its popularity, Elite was subsequently ported to nearly every computer and gaming system at the time. Elite has been called the "godfather of space games" since countless other space games wouldn't have existed if it weren't for Elite.

=== Elite Plus ===
Elite Plus was developed and published by Microplay Software in 1991. It was coded in assembly language by Chris Sawyer. It's considered an upgraded light version of the original Elite and only available for MS-DOS and compatible operating systems.

=== Frontier: Elite II ===
The sequel Frontier: Elite II (1993) was developed by David Braben and published by GameTek and Konami. Bell had limited involvement in Elite II, and was not involved in the production of other sequels. Chris Sawyer was an additional programmer and made the PC conversion. Sawyer added texture mapping to the 3D systems with an algorithm for pixel-by-pixel texture plotting and used self-modifying code to increase the game speed. Braben founded the video game studio Frontier Developments in 1994.

Frontier featured many technical advancements and new features on the original Elite, including filled 3D graphics, missions and a complex economy. This time, the player was not confined to orbit but could land on and explore or mine planets. The number of flyable ships was greatly increased, and a new political backstory was introduced enabling the player to gain ranks in competing interstellar empires. Frontier: Elite II appeared on the Amiga, Atari ST, and IBM PC compatibles. Frontier received near universal acclaim by video game critics.

=== Frontier: First Encounters ===
The third title Frontier: First Encounters was developed by Frontier and published only for IBM PC in 1995. First Encounters was considered flawed in a number of respects with many bugs, due apparently to being published in an incomplete state. First Encounters was extensively patched, then reissued and finally withdrawn from sale. This was followed by a lawsuit brought by Gametek against David Braben. The two games employed a realistic flight model based on Newtonian mechanics rather than the original arcade-style engine. While this was more realistic, many players also found it frustratingly difficult, particularly in combat. Most space trading games since Elite have stuck to an arcade-style flight model, in which the ships behave as though they are flying in an atmosphere. Braben was the project leader and involved in shapes and story. Braben also programmed the game with Chris Sawyer and 6 other programmers.

=== Elite Dangerous ===
Elite Dangerous was conceived in 1998 and provisionally titled Elite 4. It was successfully crowdfunded initially through a Kickstarter campaign in late 2012, and released in December 2014. Elite Dangerous added multiplayer and extended the use of procedural generation, allowing players to fly to and survey every non-atmospheric planet of a certain size range and temperature range in a galaxy containing billions of stars. Elite Dangerous also offers both a Newtonian flight model as well as an arcade one, with the player being able to choose between them using 'flight assist.' Critics gave Elite Dangerous "generally favorable reviews" (84% positive).

== Spin-offs ==
=== Elite Dangerous: Arena ===
Elite Dangerous: Arena (2016) is an arena PVP game with fast paced spaceship combat. It's a standalone spin-off of the CQC (Close Quarters Combat) mode in Elite Dangerous. It includes 4 arenas and 3 game modes (Deathmatch, Team Deathmatch and Capture the flag). There are 4 flyable ships: F63 Condor, Eagle MkII, Sidewinder MkI and the Imperial Fighter with customizable loadouts. The game released for PC and Steam on 16 February 2016. However, by 10 February 2017 the Steam version was pulled from sale due to insufficient players. It's still available via the Elite Dangerous launcher.

== Awards ==
Guinness World Records awarded the Elite series: Elite (1984) was the first game to feature a procedurally generated world. Frontier: Elite II was the first game to feature procedurally generated star systems. Frontier: First Encounters was the first game to contain procedurally generated terrain and textures. It also holds the record for longest running space simulation series in history.
