= Oolite (video game) =

Space trading and combat video game

- Developers: Giles Williams, Jens Ayton
- Publishers: Giles Williams, Jens Ayton
- Platforms: Microsoft Windows; Linux macOS (Note: Support ended in February 2026); SGI Irix (Note: Support ended in July 2011); FreeBSD (Note: Not officially supported); Pandora
- Release: WW: July 2004
- Genre: Space trading and combat simulator
- Mode: Single player

Oolite
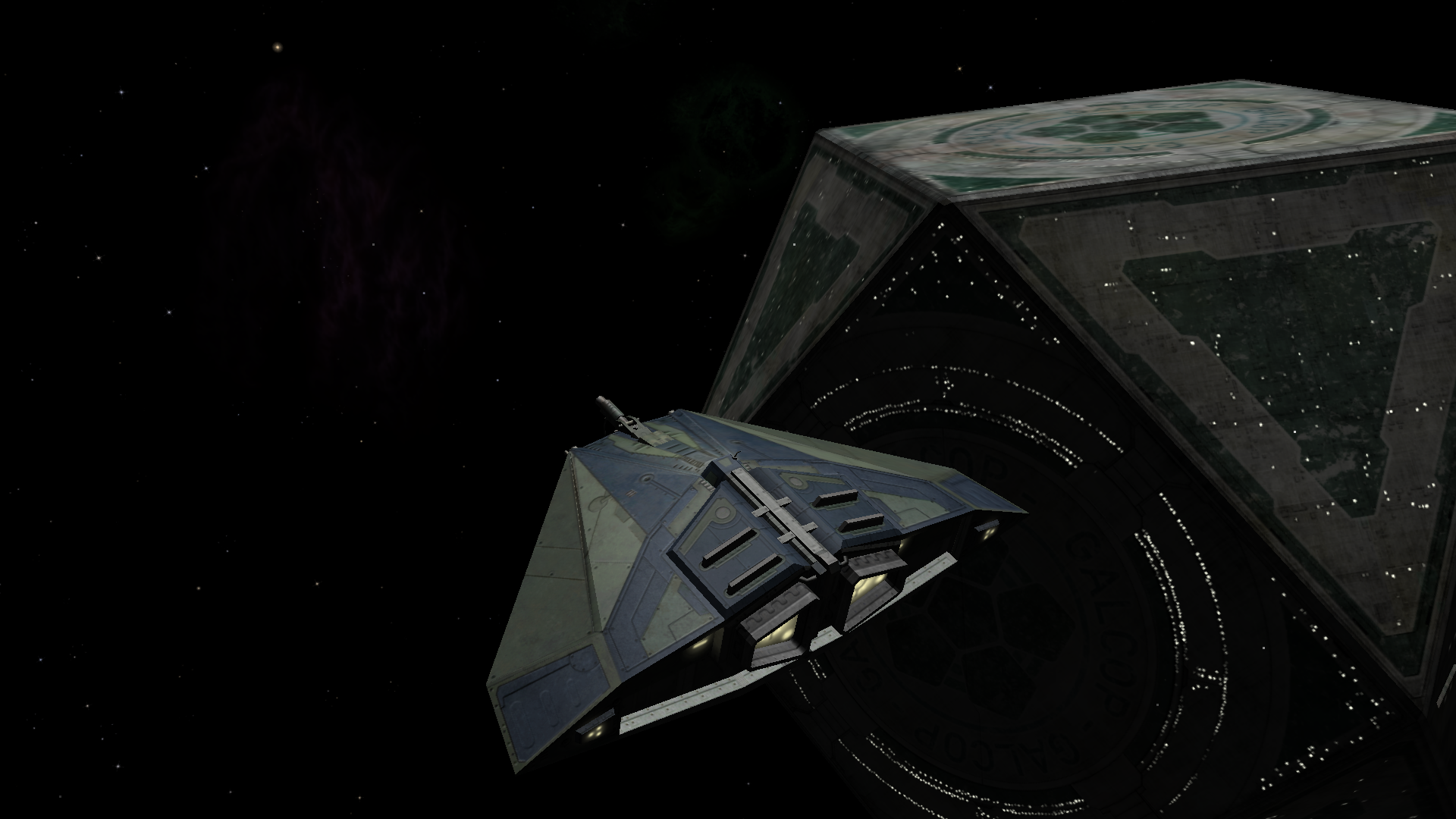
- A Cobra Mk. III near a Coriolis station in Oolite
- Release: July 2004; 22 years ago
- Stable release: v1.92 / 4 February 2026; 6 months ago
- Operating system: Microsoft Windows; Linux macOS
- Platform: cross platform
- License: GPL-2.0-or-later; Resources dual-licensed under GPL-2.0-or-later and CC BY-NC-SA-3.0
- Website: oolite.space
- Repository: https://github.com/OoliteProject/oolite

Oolite is a free and open source 3D space trading and combat simulator "in the spirit of" Elite, a similar game published in the 1980s. The name is a contraction of object oriented Elite, because it was written in Objective-C, an object-oriented programming language. Among Oolite's several similarities to its source, the gaming experience is enhanced by the context set in Elite's original manual, and the accompanying novella, The Dark Wheel. Oolite is licensed under GPL-2.0-or-later for the source code, while resources (pictures, music, textures, models) are dual-licensed under GPL-2.0-or-later and CC BY-NC-SA-3.0.

== History ==
Giles Williams began work on Oolite for Mac OS X in 2003. In July 2004, Oolite v1.0 was released but remained in active development for a long time afterwards.

By September 2005, Mac Oolite had reached v1.52, and a Linux port was released, closely following the Mac OS X developments since.

In March 2006, the Windows GNUstep port was released. Ports are also available for SGI IRIX and FreeBSD on Intel architectures. Most ports include the same functionality except for the Mac OS X version which includes additional support of native Mac OS X features (such as integration with iTunes, Spotlight and Growl support).

In October 2006, after releasing the stable 1.65 version, Williams announced he would stop developing Oolite after implementing updated OpenGL shader functionality. However, the project stalled.

On 27 February 2007, the project was relicensed under the GPL-2.0-or-later. Jens Ayton was nominated as maintainer, and after a lag, active development continued by the community. Subsequently, there were a number of test releases, with most notably the addition of JavaScripting capabilities to write missions and shader support.

On 16 December 2011, a new stable version, v1.76, to replace 2006's v1.65, was released.

On 27 May 2012, a new stable version, v1.76.1, was released. This is a bug-fix update to Oolite 1.76. It does not add new features.

On 16 August 2012, a trial deployment version of v1.76.1 was released. The purpose of the release is to evaluate Oolite's Deployment configuration, which is the way upcoming stable releases are expected to be made.

On 8 January 2013, a new test deployment version, v1.77, was released. This version comes with new features and improvements over previous releases.

On 1 October 2013 a new test deployment version, v1.77.1 was released. This is a bug-fix update to Oolite 1.77. It does not add new features.

On 30 June 2014 a new stable version, v1.80 was released, to replace 2012's v1.76.1. It adds many new features, including greatly improved AI, an updated core shipset and an Expansion Pack management system.

On 27 May 2015 a new stable version, v1.82 was released. AI and the Expansion Pack Management System were further improved, and combat reworked to make the early game a bit easier for beginners, while still allowing plenty of challenges in the later game. Graphics and interfaces were upgraded, with the main improvement being the fully zoomable and scrollable galaxy map, which replaces the separate short-range and long-range charts. Improvements were made to multi-monitor support, explosion graphics, and planet textures, and a "field of view" setting introduced to Game Options. A Scenario Support System was introduced, essentially allowing people to rewrite the galaxies, ships, equipment and rules to make their own new space game using the Oolite engine.

On 21 July 2016, version 1.84 was released. The main additions are listed as : Mobile external view camera, multiple lasers now available to all ships, improvements to the Galactic Chart interface, improvements to overall presentation and UI.

On 25 October 2017, version 1.86 was released. It features a new terrain generation algorithm for more realistic looking land sections, adds cloud layers and adjusts ambient lighting for an overall more aesthetically pleasing result. The maximum resolution the game can support has been increased to 8K UHD levels. Other additions are high-DPI support on Windows, the ability to load expansion packs over HTTPS, the ability to use the mouse wheel for speed control when piloting ships using a mouse (Windows / Linux), and an Easy Start scenario for commanders who struggle to get their Lave-based MkIII combat-ready.

On 28 October 2018, version 1.88 was released. It features a significantly revamped graphics and lighting system. Modern lighting techniques have been deployed, applying physically accurate and energy conserving models for specular reflections on both ships and planets. Visual effect entities can now utilize transparency while the planet atmospheres have received an eye-catching makeover as well. This fusion of physically based rendering techniques and effects produces spectacular Oolite visuals that have never looked better. The new lighting system also works in favor of Oolite's materials system, enabling the creation and usage of materials not possible before.

On 30 August 2020, version 1.90 was released. It features a much improved graphics environment, with special attention paid to planets. Atmosphere appearance on planets is now configurable and custom planets now support normal, gloss and illumination maps. Further graphics improvements include filmic tone mapping, Oren-Nayar diffuse light model, increased light source radiance for better visibility of objects in space and more. Additionally, weapons now have individual sounds assigned to them, while scripts have even more properties available for access.

On 4 February 2026, version 1.92 was released for PC and Linux; this version officially drops support for macOS. The Windows port now has the ability to render in HDR (High Dynamic Range) to support wide color range, substantial improvements to the rendering engine, with a new framebuffer pipeline with full-scene ACES tonemapping, Bloom effects, and Specular Anti-Aliasing to eliminate shimmering. There's support for new Color Blind Support modes, and Expansion Manager "Update All" and category filtering features for easier mod management. Further improvements to stability were also made. Making the game's debut on the Microsoft Store and Flathub, this version is the one currently recommended by the Oolite dev team.

== Gameplay ==
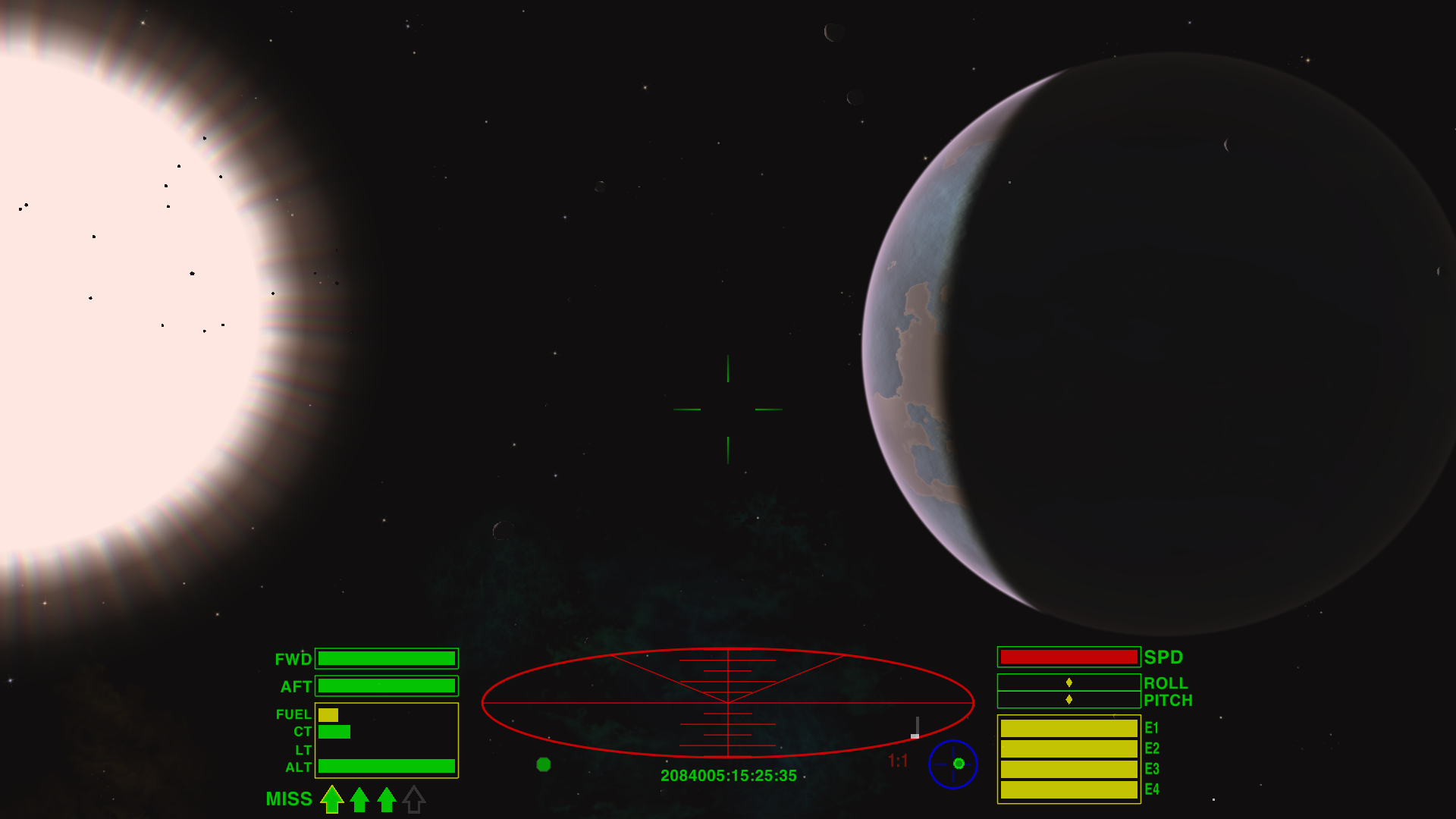
Oolite's default HUD

=== Basics ===
Like Elite, Oolite is a first-person, open-ended, single-player space trading and combat simulator. The player is the pilot of a spacecraft, capable of interstellar travel to other nearby planetary systems using wormholes generated by the ship's engines. Each system contains only one inhabited planet, with an orbiting space station; players choose the destination system by the name of its planet. Although players can create outgoing wormholes almost anywhere within a system, assuming their engines have sufficient fuel to do so, ships always enter a new system at a considerable distance from the target planet. The player must then pilot their ship from the entry point, through "normal" space, to the station. During this stage of the journey the player can encounter other ships, and combat can occur. Oolite spaceships' principal armaments are lasers and missiles. Most combats are dogfights and the ships exhibit non-Newtonian flight characteristics, being immune from the effects of inertia and gravity.

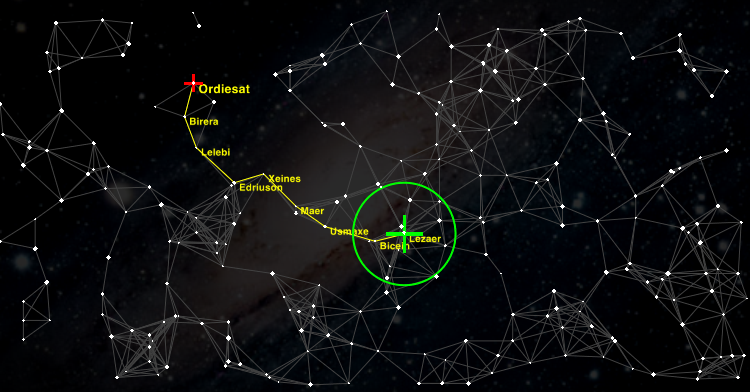
Galactic trade map of Oolite

=== Goals and objectives ===
There is no set goal or objective in the game. Money and "Elite rating" are the only built-in forms of "score" in Oolite.

Players can earn money by buying goods in one star system and transporting them to another to sell at a profit. Money can also be earned by destroying pirate ships and collecting bounty. Players can become pirates themselves, attacking merchantmen and other ships. Although no bounty is awarded for destroying non-pirate ships, when a ship is destroyed, some of its cargo can survive the explosion. If the player's ship is equipped with a scoop, this cargo can be salvaged for later resale. It is also possible, with the right equipment, to mine asteroids for ores and other materials. Players can also select to carry paying passengers or special cargos to specified destinations. Money earned or otherwise acquired can be spent on fuel for the wormhole engines (known as "Witchdrives"), ship maintenance and new equipment. The player can also seek to trade in his or her ship for other models with different characteristics and capabilities.

Each ship the player destroys, of any type or class, adds to the player's "Elite rating", a ranking based on the number of kills made. This rating begins at "harmless" (no kills), then "mostly harmless", and culminates with the "deadly" then "elite" rankings.

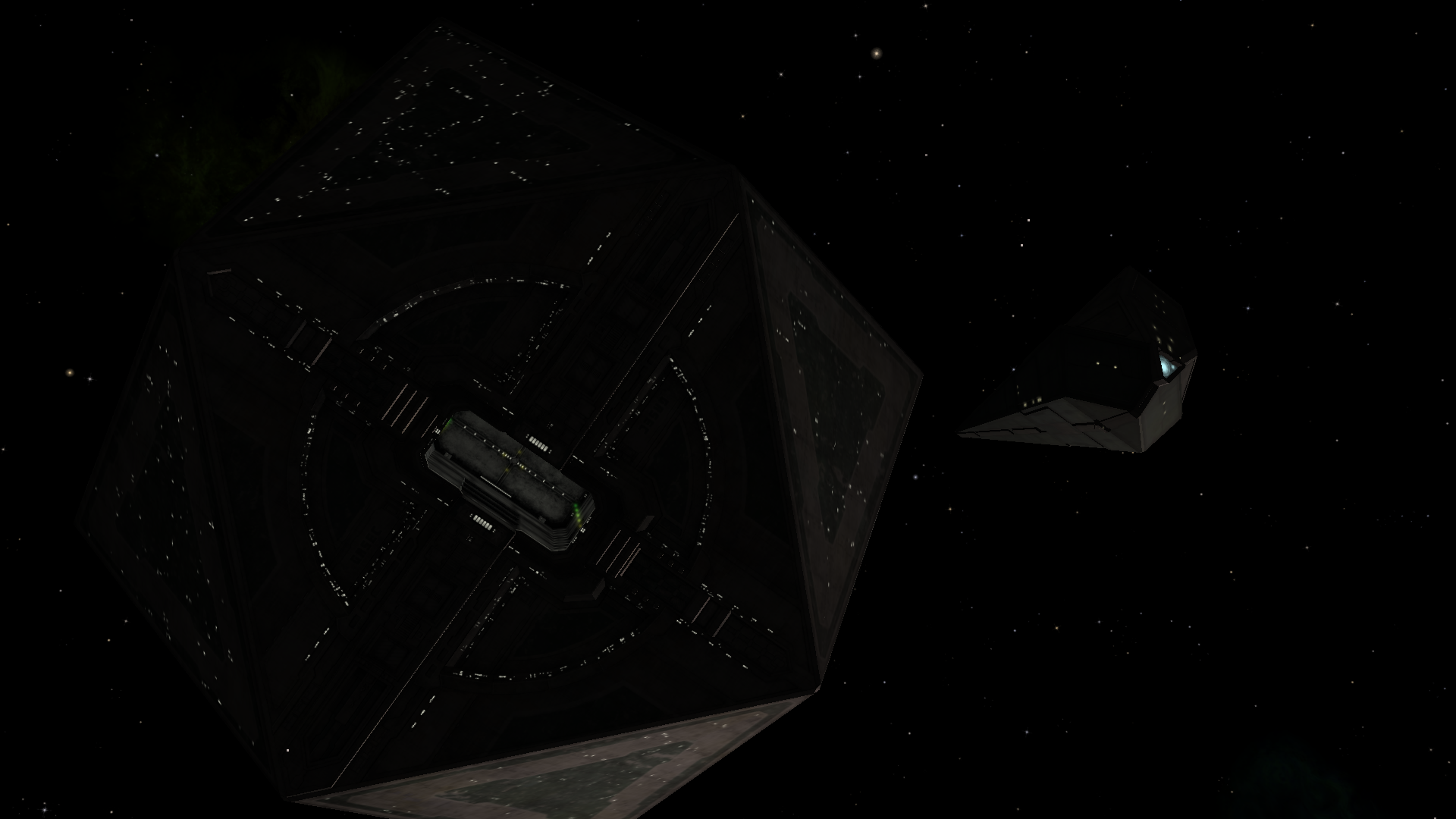
A large ship preparing to dock at a Coriolis station

=== Missions and modifications ===
There are a small number of built-in missions in the game, inherited from Elite, where the player is given specific tasks to perform, such as destroying a stolen military prototype fighter. It is not necessary to complete or even begin any of these missions to play the game, however.

Numerous modifications for Oolite have expanded the gameplay by adding in new missions, equipment, ships, space stations, trading locations and open-ended career opportunities such as courier or hitman. Others offer improved graphics, visual and audio effects, or otherwise improve ambience. These modifications are usually called OXPs (Oolite eXpansion Pack). Currently, there are more than 1000 OXPs available for Oolite.

== Modding ==
Since the game structure is intended to be ‘open–hooded’, objects and events that take place in Oolite are easily modified without need of programming skills. Only a few simple tools are needed to create an OXP. These game additions, either self-made or downloaded, are freely placed in the game's AddOns folder, allowing the player to shape the plot and population of the game universe. In recent versions, the game comes with a built-in extension manager allowing the player to browse, install, update or remove extensions by simply going through the available extensions list. This greatly simplifies the process of installing extensions and keeping them updated. There are currently over 750 extensions on the manager - and another 400 which are not.

Over Oolite's first two years, many from the Oolite community were inspired by the game's coherent modding opportunities, resulting in a fairly large pool of OXPs. Often The Dark Wheel and 80's Elite fandom are of obvious influence, although elements from alternate space operas have also been shared. A pack may simply offer more ships or stations, or contain scripted interactive missions. As adding planetary bodies, minigames, HUDs, weapons and sounds are among several possibilities, testing the potential limitations of the OXP is still at an early stage.

Below are some examples of OXPs:

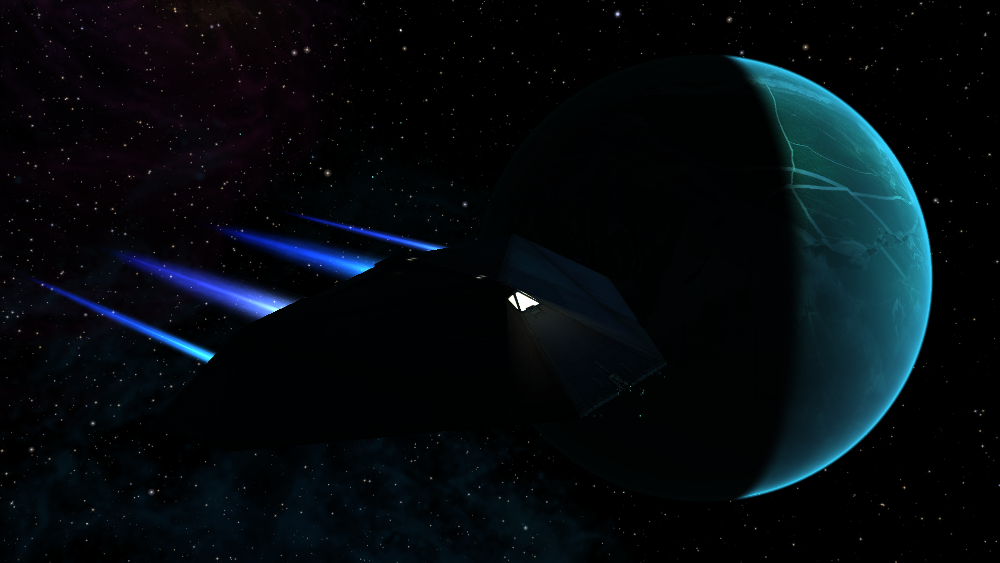
Cobra Mk. IV OXP and Additional Planets SR OXP

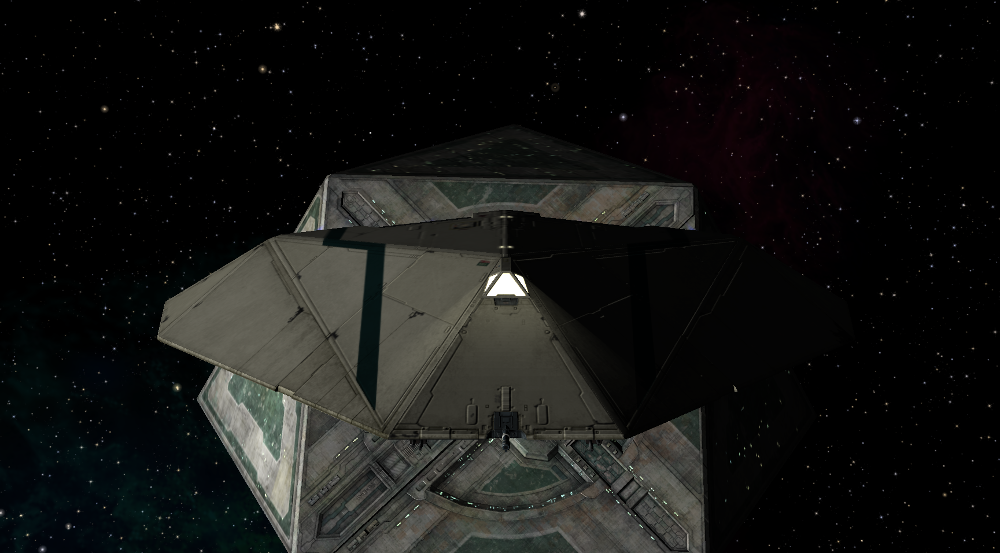
Cobra Mk. IV OXP

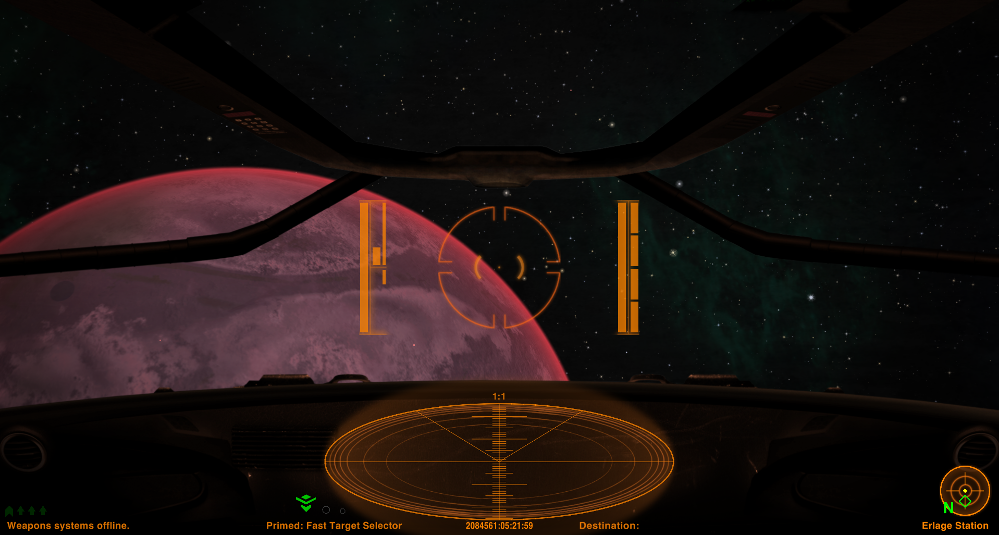
Dangerous HUD (Orange Variant) OXP and Povray Planets OXP

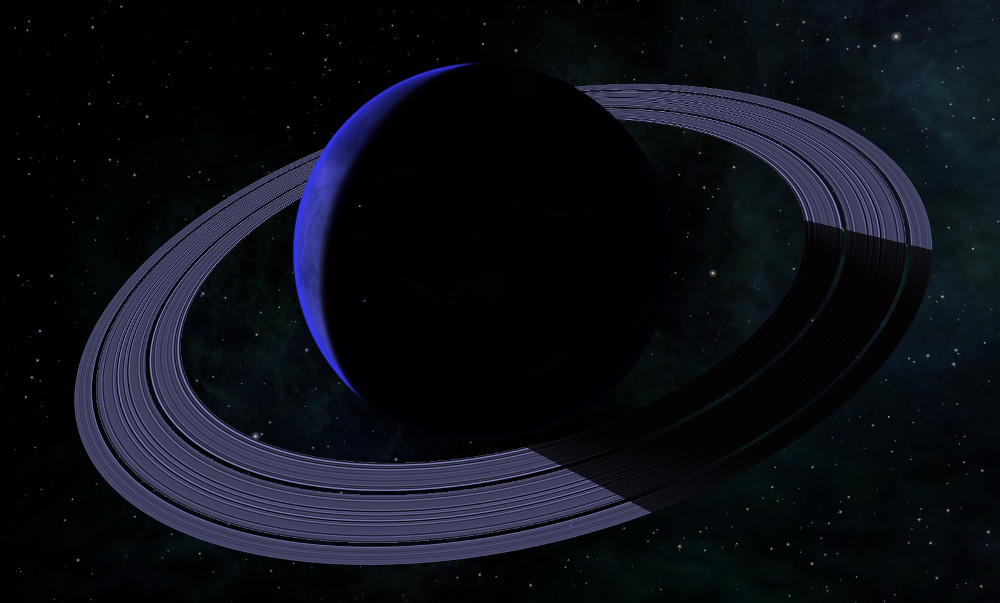
System Features: Rings OXP

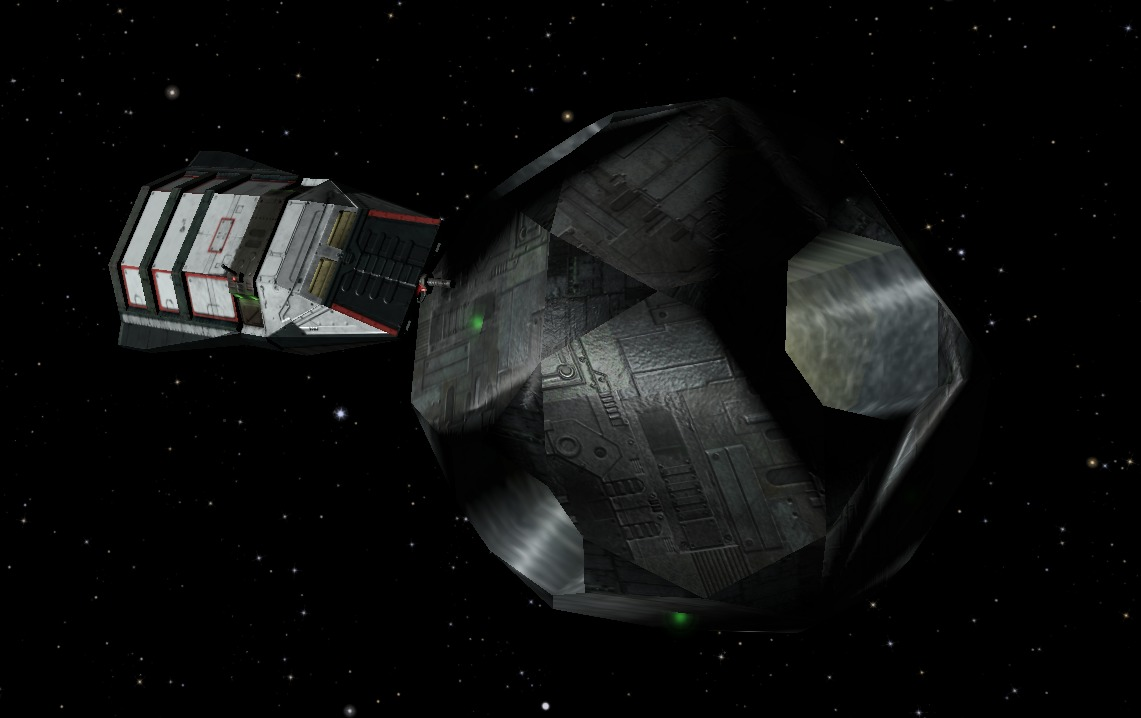
gsagostinho's Texture Pack: Adder OXP and Fuel Satellites OXP

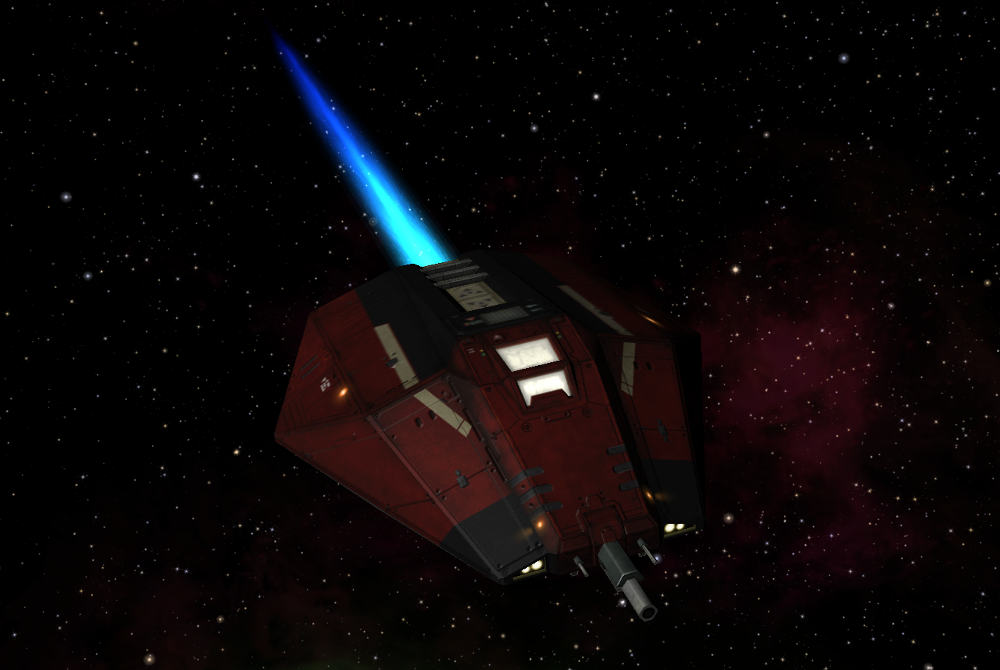
gsagostinho's Texture Pack: Asp OXP

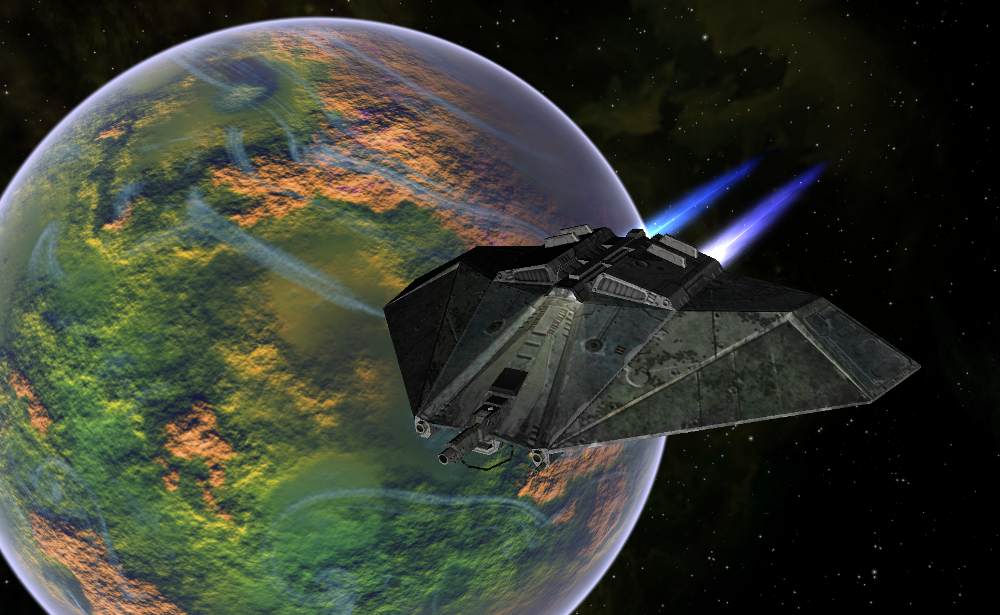
Povray Planets OXP and gsagostinho's Texture Pack: Cobra Mk. III OXP

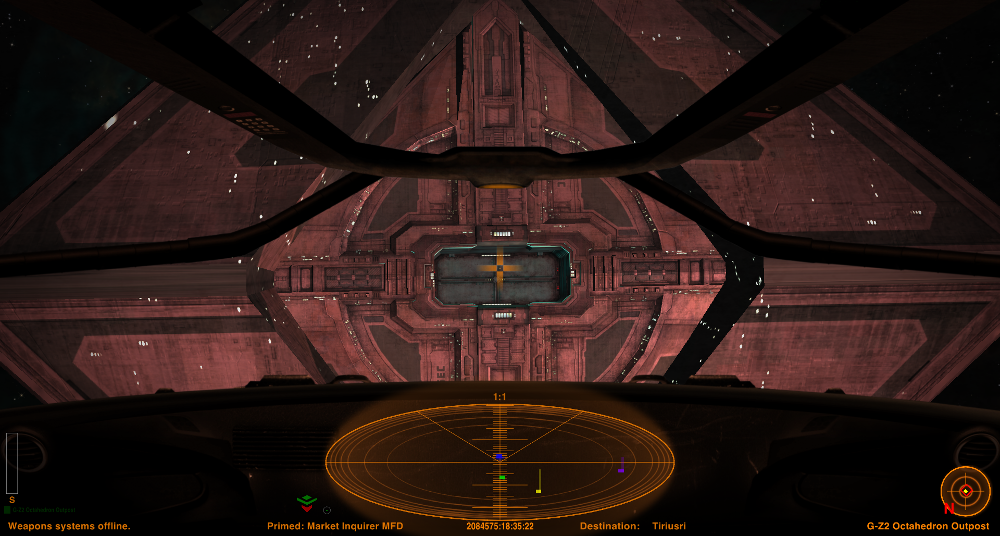
Dangerous HUD (Orange Variant) OXP and Stations for Extra Planets OXP

== Reception ==
Oolite was given four stars and the Macworld Editors' Choice Award in 2007: "Oolite (Object Oriented Elite) is as addictive and compelling today as Elite was in 1984 ... The core program is fully extensible with new ships, missions and planets – and the universe you explore in Oolite is completely open ended. This game’s a blast from the past that’s been rebuilt to last. Grab it now."

On July 24, 2009, TechRadar.com listed Oolite as one of the 10 best free PC games you should play today: "Oolite takes the exact same, brilliantly compulsive gameplay [as Elite] and makes it slicker, faster and better looking – for free. If the core package isn't thrilling enough, there are expansion packs available, too."

Freewaregenius.com reviewed Oolite in October 2009, calling it "a brilliant remake of Elite ... If you’re starving for a good space simulator, Oolite will satisfy. With a more rewarding trade system than its contemporaries, fast paced combat, and a healthy dose of retro appeal, this is worth checking out."

NAG Online reviewed Oolite in September 2010, giving it a score of 85%: "A true classic reincarnated and reimagined: a must-play for space-sim fans."

== See also ==
- List of open source games
