= Garfield: Winter's Tail =

1989 video game

- Developers: The Edge; Softek
- Publisher: The Edge
- Programmers: Steve Cargill (Amiga & Atari); David Kirby (C64)
- Artists: Jack Wilkes (Amiga & Atari); Andy Howlet (C64)
- Composer: David Lowe
- Platforms: Amiga, Atari ST, Commodore 64, ZX Spectrum, Amstrad CPC
- Release: EU: 1989
- Genre: Action
- Mode: Single player

Garfield: Winter's Tail is a game based on the Jim Davis comic strip, Garfield. It was released in 1989 for Amiga, Amstrad CPC, Atari ST (will not work on Atari STe computers), Commodore 64 and ZX Spectrum. It is the fourth video game to be based on Jim Davis' Garfield Comics.

== Plot ==
Garfield has fallen asleep in his bed in front of an open refrigerator, dreaming about having an adventure in northern Italy and Switzerland, in which his quest is to find a lasagna factory and the chocolate-egg-laying chicken.

== Gameplay ==
Garfield start screen

Chocolate Factory

The game is divided into an Action sports game where fast reaction is needed (Skiing & Skating level) and some sort of puzzle game (Chocolate Factory). The player will encounter some familiar faces from the Garfield comics (like Odie and Jon Arbuckle), but the player can control only Garfield. Garfield’s energy meter is pictured with his face from happy to sad, getting sadder by every accident. If he loses too much energy he wakes up (sometimes in fright).

Skiing & Lasagna Factory
Garfield hits the slopes on a pair of skis, while the player guides him past obstacles like trees, bushes, rocks, and stumps. The player is then joined by Odie who uses, unlike Garfield, a dustbin lid to slide down the hill. There are also spectators on the side of the route, holding food that Garfield and Odie could grab to gain back energy. As he jumps on the big ramp at the end of the hill, Garfield reaches the top of the Lasagna Factory. Once in the Lasagna Factory, Garfield eats as much lasagna as he can until Odie ends the fun by blowing out the fire from the lasagna oven.

Chocolate Factory
To find the chocolate-egg-laying chicken, Garfield has to manipulate the indicators on the feeding pipes in the factory. As Garfield is losing energy, he has to eat all kinds of food lying on the floor. He is once again joined by Odie who tries to steal the food.

Skating on the frozen lake
Garfield has to reach the other side of the lake to get to the Swiss village in pursuit of the escaped chocolate-egg-laying chicken, avoiding all obstacles and holes in the ice. Odie is also with him, sporadically sawing a hole into the ice. Garfield can gain energy by eating the chocolate chicken footprints.

== Reception ==
The reviews were mixed; despite its good presentation, it was heavy criticized for the bad design and controls. Some example reviews are listed below

"The graphics are cute and cuddly and Garfield is his usual canine-punting, lasagna-gobbling self." - 80% - The Games Machine

"The gameplay that is present is also very simple, but Garfield fans will no doubt enjoy this light-hearted, lightweight licence." - 63% - Zzap

"Once again though, good presentation is let down by a poor game design." - 43% - Amiga Format

"Garfield can only sit and wait, and hope that some talented individual with the patience of job can finish the game and rescue him from this nightmare that "The Edge" created." - 39% - Amiga Computing
