= International Karate + =

1987 video game

- Developer: System 3
- Publishers: System 3 (Europe); Activision (U.S.); Ignition Entertainment (PS1/GBA)
- Designer: Archer Maclean
- Composers: Rob Hubbard (C64, ZX, CPC); David Lowe (ST, Amiga)
- Platforms: Commodore 64, Amstrad CPC, ZX Spectrum, Atari ST, Amiga, Game Boy Advance
- Release: October 1987
- Genre: Fighting
- Modes: Single-player, multiplayer

International Karate +, stylized as IK+, is a fighting game written by Archer Maclean and published in 1987 by System 3 for the Commodore 64, Amstrad CPC, and ZX Spectrum. It is a successor to International Karate (1985). Activision published the Commodore 64 version in the US as Chop N' Drop.

== Gameplay ==
C64 screenshot

Three karateka fight against each other on a beach, trying to be the first to score six points. After every two rounds, there is a bonus game which is either deflecting bouncing balls or kicking away bombs. The C64 version of the game only has the ball bouncing bonus game, and not the bomb bonus game. The game can be played by one or two human players; at least one fighter is always controlled by the computer. Unlike its predecessor, International Karate, there is only one backdrop, but different parts of the backdrop can be recoloured to several different themes by the players using specific keystrokes. The Amiga, Atari and C64 versions of the game (and possibly other versions, unconfirmed) had a number of "background antics", a Pac-Man would appear, a spider would descend, and a U-boat's periscope would occasionally be seen in the harbour. In addition, pressing a certain key or keys would cause the trousers of all three protagonists to fall down, after which they would do a double-take. Additionally, it was possible (on the Amiga version, at least) to type in four-letter curse words; the game would respond first by rebuking the player for their use of such language, and upon the second offence would reset the game.

== Ports ==
16-bit versions of the game were released in 1988 for the Atari ST and Amiga home computers. Apart from the music, which was arranged by Dave Lowe, the Atari ST version was created entirely by Archer Maclean. The bitmap editor NeoChrome was used to draw background graphics and sprites and the code was written in assembly language on an IBM PC-based development system that cross-compiled the 800 KB of source code in seven seconds and transferred the program to the RAM of the Atari ST via a parallel cable. Development took six months. The subsequent Amiga port took just seven days.

The Game Boy Advance port was released in Europe on 14 February 2003. Later that month, publisher Ignition Entertainment announced distribution agreements across the UK, Europe, and North America for a budget range of Game Boy Advance titles, including International Karate Plus, retailing at a price point of £14.99 and sold through UK retailers such as GAME and Sainsbury's. This version retains the original gameplay format, featuring 30-second rounds where players compete against opponents or friends to earn points and advance through belt ranks up to the black belt, alongside bonus rounds occurring every third round.

== Reception ==
Reception

Review scores
Publication	Score	
Publication	C64	GBA
Nintendo Power		1/5
Your Sinclair	7/10	
Zzap!64	97%	
Advance		54%
GamesMaster		43%
576 Konzol		7/10

Awards
Publication	Award
Zzap!64	Gold Medal
Golden Joystick Award	Best Soundtrack
Crash	Smash

The original release of the game was well received by critics. It was voted Best 16-Bit Soundtrack of the Year at the 1988 Golden Joystick Awards.

The later Game Boy Advance port, however, received negative reviews. Advance, criticized the "thinness of the gameplay" and stating that "there are simply too few moves available". The reviewer noted that while nostalgic memories of the original Commodore 64 version might be positive, the port failed to compete with contemporary fighting games. Jim McCauley of GamesMaster gave the port a lower score of 43%. Nintendo Power criticized awkward controls and choppy animation. Later in 2005, Nintendo Power included the Game Boy Advance version in its "5 Worst Games Ever" list, placing it in second place with the comment, "If this game is in fact based on a real group of ninjas, I hope one day they get their revenge".

Seanbaby of Electronic Gaming Monthly also panned the gba port in his "The Rest of the Crap" column, ridiculing its clumsy controls and a lack of effort from the developers.

In contrast to the predominantly negative reception of other publications, Hungarian magazine 576 Konzol praised the release as a perfect port down to the smallest details, noted its strict fidelity to the originals made it ideal for nostalgia and highlighted its good audio but criticized its uncomfortable controls and limited color palette.

== Legacy ==
Another International Karate Deluxe game (AKA IK++) was ready but unreleased for the Atari ST and Amiga in 1987/1988.
