= Hologram (disambiguation) =

A hologram is a recording of a three-dimensional image created by holography.

Hologram may also refer to:

== Music ==
=== EPs ===
- Hologram (EP), a 2018 EP by Key
- Hologram, a 2001 EP by Eiko Shimamiya

=== Songs ===
- "Hologram" (Minmi song), 2015
- "Hologram" (Nico Touches the Walls song), 2009
- "Hologram", a song by 3OH!3 from Night Sports, 2016
- "Hologram", a song by Backstreet Boys from This Is Us, 2009
- "Hologram", a song by Chris Spedding from Enemy Within, 1986
- "Hologram", a song by the Horrors from V, 2017

== Other uses ==
- Holograms, the fictional band in the 1980s animated series Jem and the Holograms
- Hologram (wrestler), Mexican professional wrestler

== See also ==
- Holography (disambiguation)
