= Holos =

Holos may refer to:

- Holos (political party), a Ukrainian political party
- Holos (software), data management software

== People with the surname ==
- Jonas Holøs, a Norwegian hockey player
- Odd Steinar Holøs, a Norwegian politician

== See also ==
- Holo (disambiguation)
