= Cosmonautica =

2015 space trading video game

- Developer: Chasing Carrots
- Platforms: Microsoft Windows, iOS, Android
- Release: July 31, 2015
- Genres: Life simulation game, space trading
- Mode: Single-player

Cosmonautica is a video game that blends aspects of life simulation and space trading. Players take control of a spaceship and crew it with characters, each of which has their own needs and skills. By acquiring credits through missions, players can expand and customize their ship. It was released via early access on PC in 2014, and the retail version was released in July 2015 for Microsoft Windows, iOS, and Android.

== Gameplay ==
Players crew a spaceship with a mix of humans and aliens, each of whom has their own needs and skills. Crew members who have different diets do not get along with each other, resulting in conflict. Research unlocks various ship expansions that can add abilities and satisfy crew members' needs. Missions and trading at space stations net the players credits, which can be used to purchase the ship expansions. Docking at space stations also satisfies needs. During the early access, a preview from Rock, Paper, Shotgun compared its various gameplay elements to Elite, The Sims, and FTL: Faster Than Light. The developers themselves cited Elite and The Sims as inspirations.

== Release ==
Cosmonautica was greenlit on Steam in May 2014. It left early access in July 2015 and was released on Steam, iOS, and Android.

== Reception ==
Metacritic indexed three reviews for the PC version, one of which is mixed and two negative. Tom Chick, on his blog Quarter to Three, wrote that the game "makes a great first impression" but has "no meaningful challenge" or interaction. He rated it 1/5 stars and instead recommended Space Colony. At GameZone, Tyler Treese rated it 8.5/10 stars and wrote, "Cosmonautica takes hardcore simulation gameplay, but puts it in an accessible, humor-filled wrapper." In a roundup of recently released games, Christopher Livingston of PC Gamer said he did not complete the game's tutorial, which he criticized for not succinctly explaining the gameplay. The iOS version has a rating of 50/100 on Metacritic based on four reviews. 148apps reviewer Jennifer Allen rated it 3.5/5 stars, calling the iOS version a poor port of the PC game despite being "hugely ambitious". Reviewing an early access version of the game, Tom Christiansen of GameZebo also criticized the mobile port, rating it 2/5 stars, but wrote that the game had potential to improve.
