= Frontier: Elite II =

1993 video game

- Developer: David Braben
- Publishers: GameTek; Konami
- Designer: David Braben
- Programmers: David Braben; Chris Sawyer
- Composer: David Lowe
- Series: Elite
- Platforms: Amiga, Amiga CD32, Atari ST, MS-DOS
- Release: WW: October 1993
- Genre: Space trading and combat simulator
- Mode: Single player

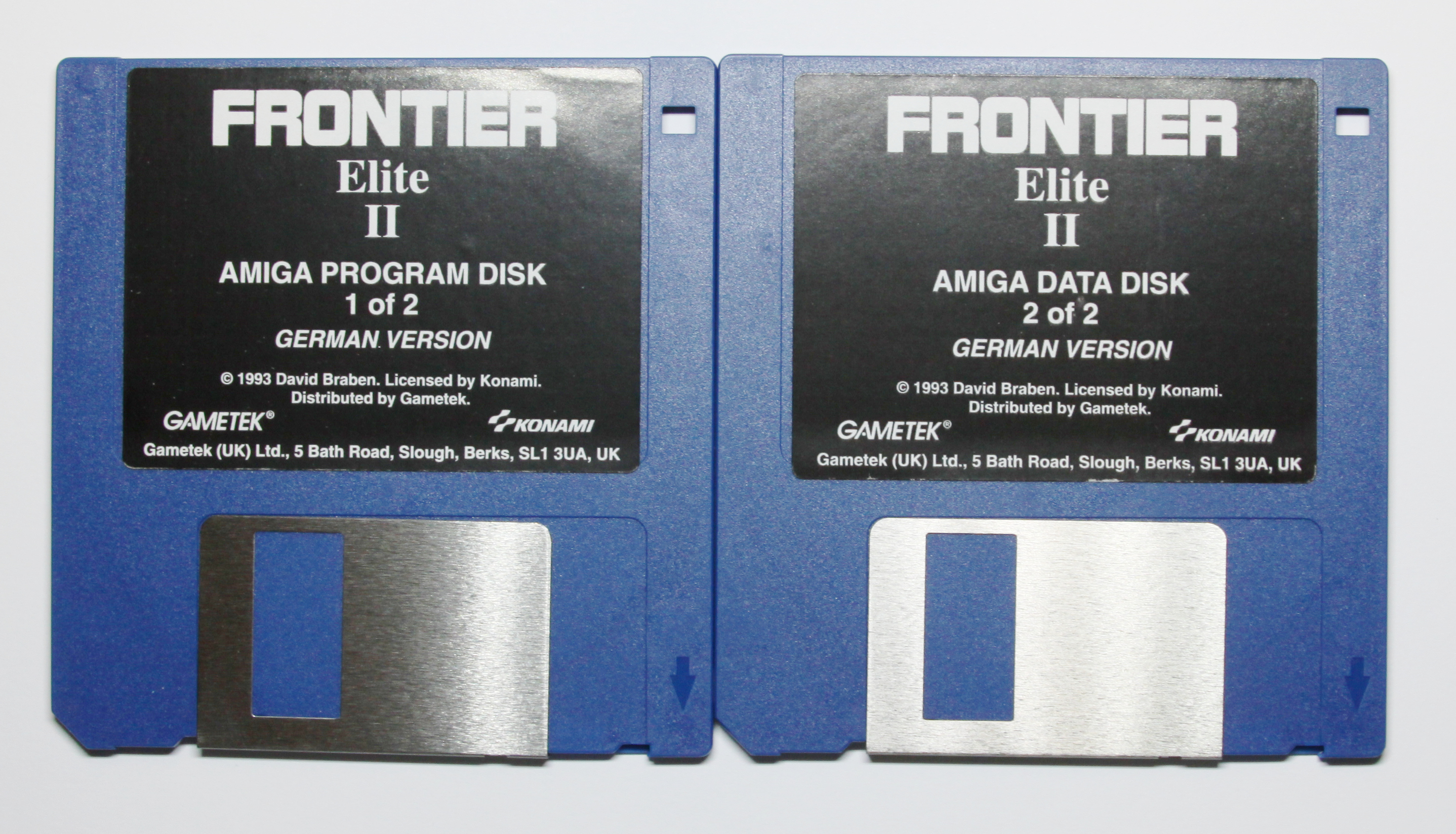
Amiga floppy disks (German version)

Frontier: Elite II is a space trading and combat simulator video game written by David Braben and published by GameTek and Konami in October 1993 for the Amiga, Atari ST, and MS-DOS. It is the first sequel to the seminal game Elite from 1984. The game retains the open-ended gameplay of Elite, and adds realistic physics and an accurately modelled galaxy.

Frontier: Elite II had a number of firsts to its name. It was the first game to feature procedurally generated star systems. These were generated by the game aggregating the mass of material within an early solar system into planets and moons that obey the laws of physics, but which have slightly randomised material distribution in order to ensure each system's uniqueness.

It was followed by Frontier: First Encounters in 1995 and Elite Dangerous in 2014.

== Gameplay ==
There is no plot within Frontier, nor are there pre-scripted missions (as there are in the sequel First Encounters). Instead, players explore space while trading legally or illegally, carrying out missions for the military, ferrying passengers from system to system, engaging in piracy or any combination of the above. As a consequence, Frontier cannot be completed or "won", and players instead decide what to aspire to and set out to achieve it.

In Frontier, the player begins in the year 3200 and assumes the role of one of Commander Jameson's grandchildren, having inherited one hundred credits and an Eagle Long Range Fighter from him. By the game's standards, these are very modest resources, and are intended as a spur to encourage players to earn money by whatever means they feel is appropriate.

Though the plot is minimal, some background information about the universe of Frontier is provided. There are two major factions in the galaxy: The "Federation", based in the Sol system, and the "Empire", based in the Achenar system. These two factions are bitter enemies, but at the time of the game they have established a tense cease-fire, akin to the Cold War. Players are free to side themselves with the Federation, the Empire, both, or neither; the game does not restrict one's political career. Both sides have military forces that a player can run freelance missions for, with successes leading to a military promotion. The ranks of the Federation and Empire are independent of each other. Playing for both sides adds to the difficulty to acquire a rank promotion for either.

Amiga screenshot

As with Elite, much of Frontier is concerned with trading: players can buy and sell a variety of goods—from food and computer parts to guns and slaves—with the aim of making the most profit possible from each trading run. Thus, learning to compare prices in various systems is essential for profitability, and calculating overheads for each trip (such as fuel, missiles, and hull repair) are essential skills. It often becomes apparent that a particular trading route is profitable, such as the Barnard's Star–Sol route. It is worth noting that some trade goods (particularly narcotics, nerve gas, weaponry and slaves) are illegal in many systems and attempting to trade in these can result in a fine from the police, which can escalate into the police attacking you if not paid. Smuggling may be worth the risk, as illegal goods generally carry a very high price on the black market.

Frontier substitutes Elite's arcade flying style for one based rigidly on Newtonian physics: momentum must first be neutralised to bring the player's craft to a stop, and turning 180° has no effect on the direction of travel until previous momentum has been counteracted. The craft's control is largely left to the player, but day-to-day tasks such as navigating from a hyperspace exit-point to a desired planet or space-station and docking can be handed over to a ship's autopilot. Travel within a star system occurs across realistic distances at realistic speeds, and therefore even with the fastest ships capable of more than 10G of acceleration, intrasystem travel can take many hours. Therefore the game provides an "accelerate time" function that makes game time pass at 10, 100, 1000, or 10,000 times the normal rate.

The issue of interstellar navigation is solved by the use of a hyperdrive to travel between stars. The player can select a system from the star map and "jump" to it, provided they are reasonably far from a settlement. They then arrive at the outskirts of that star system and must make their way to their destination. A ship's maximum range is calculated according to its mass, so small, light ships can have impressively large ranges. The time taken to travel the maximum range is always exactly one week, with shorter jumps taking less time. Unlike the rest of the game's travel, these jumps are not experienced in some multiple of real time and appear almost instantaneous (theories range from suspended animation to extreme time dilation). A hyperspace jump leaves a visible remnant, a "hyperspace cloud", at the entry and exit points. These are visible for some hours afterwards, ostensibly making it possible for pirates and assassins to track a ship through hyperspace, arrive at its destination first and attack without police intervention.

Sooner or later the player will run into enemies, most likely in the form of space pirates. The different star systems have differing government and social structures, meaning that some systems are safer than others. The Core worlds are usually the safest, with anarchic systems being the most hazardous ("Riedquat" and "Phekda" are amongst the most notorious anarchies in the game). Combat is handled completely realistically. In practice, this means both ships taking slingshot thrusts at each other, lasers being fired constantly at each other, until one of the ships is destroyed. All enemy ships destroyed count towards the player's combat rating, starting at "Harmless" and progressing towards "Elite".

The game's copy protection was worked into the game in the form of police spot-checks, making sure the player is the legitimate owner of his ship. At certain intervals in the game, the police would ask the player to "please enter the first letter of word X, row Y on page Z" of their ship's manual (which the game manual ostensibly was). If the player entered a wrong letter on three occasions, he would be arrested and his ship impounded, at which point the game ends.

=== Comparisons with Elite ===
Frontier has more advanced graphics than Elite, but this is mostly due to the differences in the underlying computer platforms, as the Amiga, Atari ST, and IBM PC offered much more power than the BBC Micro and Commodore 64. The graphics engine was advanced for its time, featuring curved Bézier surfaces, and texture mapping in the PC version.

Frontier operates on a very large scale compared to previous games, and most games since. It is, for example, possible to do realistic gravitational slingshots around supermassive stars and large planets, and in the same engine fly close enough to the ground to read the (accurate) time from the face of a clock.

Players can seamlessly land on planets, something not possible in the first Elite. Most stars also have a system of planets around them, while in the previous game there would only be a single planet and space station in every system. In addition to this some real stars had been placed in the Frontier universe, mostly near Sol, such as Alpha Centauri and Sirius. Other brighter stars such as Altair, Antares, Betelgeuse and Polaris, which are much further out, are also included. All planets and most major moons in the Sol system can also be visited. On zooming out, other galaxies are visible, although these other galaxies are simply duplicates of the first, and not accessible in any version of the game.

Similarly to the original Elite, Frontier offers dozens of ships, including small but fast fighters like the Eagle, multi-role traders like the Cobra, and huge cruisers such as the Anaconda or the Panther. Players may own only one ship at a time, so when a new ship is purchased, the old ship is part exchanged (i.e. traded in with most of its trade value deducted from the new ship's price).

== Development and release ==
Braben originally programmed the game in 68000 assembly language. It had roughly 250,000 lines of code, which were ported from 68000 assembly to 80286 assembly by Chris Sawyer. Frontier was the only game at the time to do a palette-fit every frame to get best use of colours. It also has 1:1 scale planets and star systems.

Elite II was originally slated to be released in November 1992 for the Atari ST.

Frontier: Elite II was published on a single floppy disk. For the Amiga version, this is a single 880 KB disk (disk 2 is a selection of interesting saved games), and for MS-DOS a 720 KB double density floppy. The executable file is around 400 KB (uncompressed). The universe is mostly procedurally generated.

With a 9-year sequel gap since the original Elite in 1984, Frontier was described by CU Amiga in 1993 as "the longest-awaited sequel of the decade".

The game includes a "wormhole" bug: Normally a ship's hyperdrive has a range of about 15 light years at most, so planetary systems dozens of light years away are too far to reach in one hyperspace jump. However, if the player happened to find a system 655.36 to 670.36 light years away, it would be counted by the game as within the "15 light year" range. This would also happen for systems slightly beyond 1310.72 light years, 1966.08 light years, and other multiples of 655.36. With a bit of careful triangulation it was usually possible to get near or directly to a destination system any distance away by means of just two such "wormhole" jumps.

There is a selection of MIDI interpretations of classical music by composers such as Wagner, Mussorgsky and Grieg. Strauss's The Blue Danube is played during any space station docking sequence, a homage to the film 2001: A Space Odyssey. "The Great Gate of Kiev" and "In the Hall of the Mountain King" in the game are very close to electric organ interpretation by Emerson, Lake & Palmer. In addition to this, David Lowe provided two original classical-style pieces, one of which was for the intro sequence.

The game has since been released as shareware and is available as a free download, although users of post-Windows 98 operating systems may have difficulty getting it to run. Primarily this was because of the game using EMS type memory rather than XMS. The expanded memory manager EMM386 had to be configured to use it. Using emulation such as DOSBox will get the official shareware version of the game to run on modern operating systems such as Windows 7, Windows XP, Mac OS X, and Linux.

== Reception ==
Reception

Review scores
Publication	Score
CU Amiga	97%
Amiga Action	93%
PC Zone	95%
PC Review	9/10
The One	96%
CVG	96%
Amiga Format	90%
Amiga Joker	91%
Amiga Computing	94%
Electronic Entertainment	8/10
Amiga Power	75%

The official Frontier website puts sales at about 500,000 copies sold. Braben received royalties for 350,000 copies.

Frontier received near-universal critical acclaim by the media. Most magazines were awestruck by its sheer scale and accurate depiction of real-world physics, and gave it high ratings. Computer Gaming World in April 1994 favorably discussed the game's "ENORMOUS universe" with "many, many hours of exploratory game play ... less of a game, and more a way of life". A longer review the next month reported that the game compensated for the Amiga version's 16-color palette with "a surprising amount of graphic detail". The magazine concluded that "Frontier should offer months, or even years, of galaxy-trekking fun" as players explored the "incredibly immense" universe. Amiga Computing rated the game 94% and said "Undeniably another all-time classic in the making from Mr Braben. Great graphics and absorbing play make Frontier the ultimate space experience - ever."

A notable exception was Amiga Power, who viewed the game not as a successor to Elite's throne, but as a space flying game on its own right, and were disappointed by its lack of action; this made them dismiss the game as boring, rating it 65% (75% on the faster Amiga 1200).. Amiga Power later ranked Frontier #100 in the magazine's top 100 games list.

In 2004, readers of Retro Gamer voted it as the 20th top retro game, with the editors commenting: "More so than its predecessor, Frontier was a game you either loved or hated. Some found it far too dull and were unable to get to grips with it, while fans just couldn't get enough. This was lucky really as Frontier was staggeringly huge on a mind-bending scale. The game universe contained millions of planets, and coupled with the 'do what you like' gameplay, this was a game that could take over your entire existence." It was named #77 on PC Zone's "101 Best PC Games Ever" list in 2007. In 1994, PC Gamer UK named Frontier the 16th best computer game of all time. The editors called it "a worthy successor to Elite, and another classic in its own right."

== Legacy ==
Frontier was succeeded in April 1995 by the MS-DOS-only First Encounters. Amiga 1200 and CD32 versions were planned and previewed in magazines, but cancelled. A third sequel, Elite Dangerous was semi-crowdfunded through a Kickstarter campaign and released on 16 December 2014.

Circa 2005, Tom Morton reverse engineered a platform-neutral C version of Frontier, called glFrontier making the game natively and fast playable on modern OSes.
