= Frontier: First Encounters =

1995 video game

- Developer: Frontier Developments
- Publisher: GameTek
- Director: David Braben
- Programmers: David Braben; Chris Sawyer
- Writers: David Braben; Manda Scott
- Composer: David Lowe
- Series: Elite
- Platforms: DOS, Windows, Linux, Mac OS X
- Release: April 1995
- Genre: Space trading and combat simulator
- Mode: Single-player

Frontier: First Encounters is a 1995 space trading and combat simulator video game developed by Frontier Developments and published by GameTek for DOS. The player pilots a spaceship through a universe pursuing trading, combat and other missions.

First Encounters was the first game to use procedural texturing to generate the vegetation, snow and other features on the planet surfaces. Mountain ranges, cliffs and alien landscapes and visual effects all contributed to the atmosphere of the game.

The third game in the Elite series, it is the direct sequel to Frontier: Elite II, and was followed by Elite Dangerous in 2014.

== Gameplay ==
Ship flying over the terra-formed planet Mars

First Encounters carried over the gameplay features from its immediate predecessor Frontier: Elite II, in that the game is a combination of trading, fighting, espionage, bombing and a variety of other military activities; the combat ratings were also carried over from the previous games. Like Elite II, First Encounters features realistic Newtonian physics, the ability to seamlessly land on 1:1 scale planets in authentic 1:1 scale star systems, and rival factions for which the player can perform missions, gaining or losing standing accordingly. The game's graphics were an improvement on the previous game, introducing Gouraud shading and more extensive use of texture mapping. As well as employing the same open-ended gameplay of its predecessors, First Encounters also features a storyline which takes the player through a series of events starting with the "Wiccan Ware Race" and missions concerning an alien race called the Thargoids. Some of these missions can only be completed under specific circumstances, or with specific combat ratings. The missions take place between 3250 (the start-date of the game) and approximately 3255.

Comparing First Encounters to earlier games in the series, creator David Braben said that where the original Elite was "basically just trading" and Elite II positioned the trading as "something to do while doing missions", the developers had done "almost no work" expanding the trading for First Encounters, as it was not seen as the focus of the game. The player's objective is instead to explore, have fun and "find out what's happening with the aliens", although how they achieve this would depend on how they played the game.

In addition to these now-established tenets of the Elite series, First Encounters added full motion video BBS character faces in the CD-ROM version and journals which report on happenings within the game's known universe, occasionally mentioning the player's exploits. The game also allows the player to earn special ships that are not available to buy. These ships are given as rewards for completing missions; the ships are the Turner-class Argent's Quest, the Stowmaster-class fighter (which comes with the Argent's Quest, equipped as the escape pod) and the Thargoid Warship, given to the player by the Thargoids at the completion of the Thargoid missions.

== Development ==
Braben was the project leader and worked on shapes. The story was made by Braben and Manda Scott. There were 8 programmers among which were Braben and Chris Sawyer.

== History ==
First Encounters was the sequel to Frontier: Elite II. It was released by the financially struggling publisher, GameTek in Easter 1995. Due apparently to being published in an incomplete state, the game was significantly flawed in a number of respects on release. As FFE was originally riddled with many bugs, the game was extensively patched, later reissued as shareware (like Elite II) but finally withdrawn from sale. This was followed by a lawsuit brought by David Braben against GameTek, accusing the publisher of forcing the studio to release the game too early. The lawsuit was settled out-of-court in 1999.

In 2000 Frontier Developments announced that FFE would be open-sourced under a GPL-similar license allowing ports, but this never happened. In response the community took up the support of the game, which was successfully reverse engineered by John Jordan and ported for modern operating systems in October 2005. JJFFE was updated until December 2009 and was later, due to the source code availability, taken up by other community developers with improved ports like FFED3D-AJ or GLFFE.

== Reception ==
Reception

Review score
Publication	Score
Computer Game Review	60/57/58

First Encounters was well reviewed, despite being released before the development team thought it was ready. While the game employed an advanced and realistic Newtonian mechanics flight model, rather than the original arcade-style engine, many players found it frustratingly difficult, particularly in combat. In a negative review, Computer Game Review's Tasos Kaiafas wrote, "If another Elite is planned for the future, this baby should be thrown out the window with the bath water." According to Frontier Developments the game shipped around 100,000 units.
