= Holography (disambiguation) =

Holography is a technique for recording and reconstruction of wavefronts.

Holography and holographic may also refer to:

- Holograph, a document written entirely in the handwriting of the person who signed it
- Holographic principle, a conjecture of quantum gravity
- Holographic weapon sight, non-magnifying gun sight
- Windows Holographic, augmented reality computing platform
- Holographic kinetics, a spiritual therapy in alternative medicine based on Aboriginal lore

== See also ==
- Hologram (disambiguation)
