= Holon (disambiguation) =

Holon is a city on the central coastal strip south of Tel Aviv, Israel.

Holon may also refer to:

- Holon (Nik Bärtsch album), 2008
- Holon (Equinox album), 1998
- Holon (philosophy), something that is simultaneously a whole and a part
- Holon (physics), a quasiparticle that electrons can split into during the process of spin–charge separation
- Holon (sculpture), a sculpture by Donald Wilson in Portland, Oregon

== See also ==
- Holo (disambiguation)
