= Elite Dangerous =

2014 space trading and exploration simulator

- Developer: Frontier Developments
- Publisher: Frontier Developments
- Directors: David Braben (former); Piers Jackson (current)
- Producers: Adam Woods (former); Gauthier Verquerre; Michael Brookes (former)
- Designers: Curtis Griffiths; Dan Davies; Derin Halil (former); Gareth Hughes; Laurence Oldham; Louise McLennan; Luke Betterton; Sandro Sammarco (former); Steve Kirby; Tom Kewell
- Programmers: Dominic Corner; Igor Terentjev; Kay Ross (former); Mark Allen
- Artists: Alik Sarkisyan; Chris Gregory; Dean Searle; Emilie Rinna; John Laws; John Roberts; Josh Atack; Paul Worster; Sam Piper; Simon Brewer; Xavier Henry
- Composers: Dan Millidge; Erasmus Talbot; Jim Croft
- Series: Elite
- Engine: Cobra
- Platforms: Windows; macOS (Note: Until December 2018); Xbox One (Note: Until March 2022); PlayStation 4
- Release: Windows 16 December 2014; macOS 12 May 2015; Xbox One 6 October 2015; PlayStation 4 27 June 2017
- Genres: Space trading and combat; First-person shooter; Immersive sim; MMO
- Modes: Single-player, multiplayer

Elite Dangerous (Note: Originally released as Elite: Dangerous, the name was changed to remove the colon when Horizons was released.) is an online space, trading, exploration and combat simulation game developed and published by Frontier Developments. The player commands a spaceship in a realistic 1:1 scale open-world representation of the Milky Way, with open-ended gameplay. Players can explore and engage with a procedurally generated galaxy, which includes around 400 billion star systems. The procedural system allows landing on planets with no or tenuous atmospheres. Many planets have special flora and fauna including alien and human settlements.

Elite Dangerous is the fourth game in the Elite series and the sequel to Frontier: First Encounters (1995). It is the first Elite game to feature massively multiplayer and first-person on foot gameplay, space colonization of star systems, and player actions affect the overarching story of the persistent universe, while retaining a single-player mode.

In November 2012, Frontier began a Kickstarter campaign for Elite Dangerous to test-market the concept, verify broader interest and raise funds. It was released for Windows in December 2014, macOS in May 2015, Xbox One in October 2015 and PlayStation 4 in June 2017. Elite Dangerous supports most virtual reality headsets on Windows. Development was led by David Braben until August 2022.

The game has received a plethora of seasons of updates with free major downloadable content. There are two paid expansions Horizons (15 December 2015) and Odyssey (18 May 2021). Horizons added features such as landing on planets without atmospheres, surface recon vehicle, engineering, ship-launched fighters, multicrew, avatars, guardian ruins, and tourist beacons. Horizons is included for free in the base-game since 27 October 2020. Odyssey added landing and disembarking on planets with tenuous atmospheres, settlements, geological features, on-foot equipment and customization, ships, fleet carriers, concourse in star ports, various activities in first-person like mercenary and exobiology. By September 2022, sales of Elite Dangerous had passed 4.8 million units.

== Gameplay ==
An Orbis station near an Earth-like planet. Players can dock at stations to trade, obtain ship upgrades or acquire missions.

Elite Dangerous combines features from space simulator, first person shooter and massively multiplayer genres with a persistent-galaxy based on the Milky Way. There are 3 game modes: Solo (single player), Private Group (friends and invites), and Open Play (play with everyone).

Upon its release in 2014, Elite Dangerous (ED) began in the year 3300 and has been in sync with UTC albeit 1,286 years in the future. The game is set around 45 years after Frontier: First Encounters. Elite Dangerous retains the basic premise of its predecessors: players start with a spaceship and a small amount of money in a 1:1 scale, open galaxy and roleplay in various activities to acquire more money (credits) and merit. A key difference is the addition of on-foot, first-person gameplay which was added with the Odyssey expansion on 19 May 2021. This enables first person gameplay such as collecting genetic samples of alien flora for exobiology and first-person shooter combat. Other activities for example are trading, mining, exploration, exobiology, passenger carrier, smuggling, bounty hunting, piracy and assassination. Players can also socialize in first person with other players and NPCs in the concourse of a space station or planetary settlement. System Colonisation is a major new feature in the Elite series which requires the Odyssey expansion. Players can claim uninhabited star systems, build colonies with facilities and shape the economies as the system architect. Colonization was added as a free update in beta on 26 Feb 2025 with the full release on 11 Nov 2025.

ED is the first in the series to feature online multiplayer with access to a massively multiplayer persistent galaxy via Open Play, as well as an online-only single player mode. Open Play allows actions that would be considered griefing in other multiplayer games as long as it does not violate the terms of service. However, some actions, such as mob mentality persecution of players, exploiting game mechanics, and obscene language to attack others could result in a ban from the servers.

Money (credits) earned throughout the in-game galaxy can be spent on buying or upgrading ships, or on foot equipment for the player character like suits and weaponry. Players can customize their ships by changing modules, e.g. engines, weapons, power plants, scanners, etc. The second in-game currency called ARX (buyable with real money) lets players purchase cosmetics for their ships, vehicles, on foot suits, and handheld weapons. Since mid-2024, new ships and some structures (Dodec station) have a three months early access for ARX and subsequently available for in-game credits.

Frontier publishes community goals, lore, and large-scale, star system, regional or galaxy-affecting stories via the in-game Galnet News and mail feature. GalNet provides the official galactic news. Tourist Beacons and Listening Posts also have background lore. Player-driven actions in community goals result in persistent changes that shape the star systems and the overarching narrative.

=== Ships and vehicles ===
There are over 45 flyable ships with highly configurable builds to suit roles and careers. Every ship is powered by a Frame Shift Drive to supercruise up to (or even exceeding) 2,000 times the speed of light in a star system. Supercruise Overdrive (SCO) temporarily boosts a ship's speed in supercruise significantly, at the cost of significantly increased fuel consumption. Interstellar travel occurs via a higher dimensional region called hyperspace. Many ships are based on the classic, polygonal shapes of the original Elite (1984) like the Cobra Mk III which continues the rich heritage. The flight model has Newtonian physics with a fly-by-wire layer applied on top. Flight assist is enabled by default. This makes combat feel visceral and seat-of-the-pants, rather than Frontier: Elite II's jousting at huge distances. Players can also acquire capital ships: Drake-Class Carrier and the Javelin-Class Carrier. The Drake is like a mobile base for players with billions of credits. The Javelin has additional features to support the operations of a squadron (guild). There are two SRVs (Surface Recon Vehicles): the Scarab and the Scorpion. An SRV Rhino has been announced. These ground vehicles make it easier to traverse a planet surface for exploration, combat or exobiology to find alien flora.

=== Galaxy ===
The virtual galaxy is a 1:1 simulation of the Milky Way where players can explore and colonise around 400 billion star systems. It is based on scientific principles, scientific data, star catalogues and theories. It is created using a mix of procedural generation with the Stellar Forge and artistic direction. Planets, moons and gas giants rotate and orbit in real time, reflecting dynamic day-night cycles. Around 150,000 of the game's star systems are taken from real astronomical data. Such as Sol and Alpha Centauri. Constellations can be seen from Sol. A few partially fictional star systems are included of Frontier and First Encounters before new exoplanets were discovered by astronomers. For example, none of the gas giants of the Fomalhaut system correspond with the detected properties of Fomalhaut b. A handful of entirely fictional systems are included. These are named after the original systems in Elite such as Lave. The remainder are procedurally generated according to scientific models. There is also cosmic phenomena like different star types, star clusters, mountains, canyons, craters, ring systems, and black holes like Sagittarius A*. There are 141 nebulae based on the Milky Way. 32 other galaxies are visible from the Milky Way. The classic Coriolis starport was also updated to the modern visuals of ED. The Odyssey expansion added planets with tenuous atmospheres. The atmospheric visuals are based on their composition, Rayleigh and Mie scattering. Minerals and metals can be extracted from asteroids in planetary rings and on a planetary surface. Some planets have alien organisms, mineral formations, plants. There are notable stellar phenomena like seed pods, mollusks and anomalies in space. Players can dock their ships at space stations, outposts and facilities on planet surfaces in star systems to trade goods, purchase spacecrafts or on foot equipment, re-arm their ship, perform repairs and accept tasks from the Mission Board. Players may salvage lost cargo, encounter other ships and megaships, interact with the Thargoid aliens, or explore the ruins of the extinct Guardians. The galaxy map consists of 42 galactic regions, nine major galactic arms and the galactic plane. It's an evolving galaxy with dynamic star systems, economies, governments that can be shaped by players via system colonisation, and territory control via Powerplay. These changes in the galaxy are processed via the background simulation.

=== Factions ===
There are three superpowers, the Empire of Achenar, the Federation of Star Systems, and the Alliance of Independent Systems. Update 1.3 (June 2015) added Powerplay: a grand strategy layer with galactic politics and territorial control. Notable NPC leaders scheme to gain influence in the galaxy via Powerplay. For example the imperial Emperor Arissa Lavigny-Duval, Princess Aisling Duval, Denton Patreus (Admiral of the Fleet of the Empire and Senator of Eotienses) and senator Zemina Torval (CEO of Torval Mining). The Alliance has prime minister Edmund Mahon, and councilor Nakato Kaine. The Federal leaders are President Felicia Winters and Shadow President Jerome Archer. There are also influential independent powers: Li Yong-Rui (CEO of Sirius Corporation), Yuri Grom (self-proclaimed Dictator of EG Pilots), Pranav Antal (leader of the Utopia Movement), and Archon Delaine (Pirate King of the crime syndicate Kumo Crew). Players can pledge their support to one of 12 charismatic powers. Players can contribute by completing tasks while earning various rewards. The collective outcome of each faction's achievements determines a faction's standing, territorial control, and proceeding objectives. There are also competitive, galactic faction challenges. The faction-specific ship manufacturers are Core Dynamics (Federation), Gutamaya (Empire), and Lakon Spaceways (Alliance). The Empire and Federation each have a ship line that are obtained by acquiring ranks within the respective faction. Alliance ships are not locked behind a ranking system. The independent ship manufacturers are Brewer Corporation, Faulcon DeLacy, Saud Kruger, and Zorgon Peterson.

=== Roles and ranks ===
Every player is a member of the Pilots Federation and holds the honorific title of "commander" (CMDR) which is separate from their actual rank and experience. They receive a rank based on their in-game achievements and experience. The main rank categories are: Combat, Trade, Explorer, CQC, Mercenary and Exobiologist. The latter two ranks were introduced with the Odyssey expansion. The rank for CQC (Close Quarters Combat) requires competing in PVP ship combat matches. Players gain experience points by doing activities that are related to the rank categories. For example, a bounty hunter destroying pirates gains Combat experience and rank progression. On 15 March 2015, the first player who reached Triple Elite status (Elite rank in Combat, Exploration, and Trading), won £10,000, while the first player who reached 1 Elite rank won £1,000. Players who reach triple elite in Combat, Trade and Explorer are awarded with a special Triple Elite crest by the Pilots Federation. The maximum rank per category was increased to Elite V. Certain ranks in major factions grant permits (access) to special star systems. Benefits also include discounts to ship prices.

== Synopsis ==
=== Setting ===
Elite Dangerous is set in the 34th century, 50 years after the events of Frontier: First Encounters, starting in the year 3300 (equals 2014). Humanity is expanding from the Core Systems (aka Bubble) into the unpopulated regions of the Milky Way. The Frameshift Drive was introduced by Sirius Corporation in 3297. FSD equipped ships go up to (or exceeding) 2,000 times FTL in a star system (the maximum supercruise speed is negatively impacted by nearby planetary or stellar gravitational wells). Hyperspace is used for interstellar travel in a few seconds. Ships are as affordable to the middle-class as cars in the 20th century. Owning a ship expands career possibilities like mining, trading, and bounty hunting. However, little has changed for the underclass. The megacorporations employ entire nations and rule unchecked over sections of the galaxy. Politics is rarely an obstacle in deep space. Most star systems are lawless which necessitates a laissez faire ownership of weapons. Outside the Core Systems are dangerous hazards, factions, pirates and alien creatures. The only known living sapient species are Humans and the insectoid Thargoids. The Guardians are believed to have been driven to extinction 1-2 million years ago. There are also numerous alien flora and fauna on planetary bodies and in space. There are countless facilities on planets and starports in colonized space. As of 17 June 2026, 195,463,043 star systems (about 0.0489% of the galaxy) have been cataloged, of which 97,728,089 have been explored directly, and 97,734,054 we only know the coordinates of because players plotted routes that passed through those stars.

On-demand, anti-gravity tech does not exist in ED. Ships, outposts, and installations are traversed by floating, using suit micro thrusters, or walking with magnetic boots. Starports, megaships, and other very large ships have rotating rings that rely on centripetal force to generate gravity.

The First Thargoid War occurred in 3125-3151 before ED. The humans were represented by the superpower GalCop (Galactic Cooperative of Worlds), founded in August 2696. The war began in 3125 when colonists in the Veliaze system contacted a Thargoid and assaulted it. The territorial Thargoids responded with military force. The humans were severely disadvantaged by the technological superior Thargoids. Scientists of the clandestine paramilitary organization INRA (Intergalactic Naval Reserve Arm) developed the mycoid bioweapon. This was very effective against the ammonia-based Thargoids so they retreated. GalCop's focus on military involvement caused economic exhaustion. Corruption scandals at the highest levels lead to the dissolution on 19 August 3174.

There are 3 interstellar superpowers: the Alliance (Alliance of Independent Systems), Empire (Empire of Achenar) and the Federation who compete for influence in the galaxy. The Federation rose from the ashes of World War III which occurred between 2044-2055. Most countries were devastated by ICBMs with over 1 billion casualties. After the war in 2055; the United States of the Americas was the dominant power and left mostly unscathed due to its anti-missile defensive laser grid and armed satellites. The rebuilding phase made corporations dominant on Earth. The USA renamed itself to the Federation of the United States. It was renamed again to the Federation, because a reference to a pre-war power impeded the remaining countries from joining. The Federal Accord was ratified in 2242 by five member systems (Sol, Tau Ceti, Delta Pavonis, Altair, and Beta Hydri). This constitution was derived from the earlier powers, in particular the constitution of the USA, but much simplified. A key tenet is the protection of xeno-culture and lifeforms. It has a representative democracy with an elected president. The capital city is Olympus Village on Mars which replaced Washington, D.C. in the 3rd millennium. There are two main parties: Liberal Party and Republican Party. Federal Congress is in Olympus Village and has 500 Congressmen (unisex term). The Federation is socially and economically a corporatocracy that extensively uses technology like robotics and AI. By January 3308, it has the biggest population of 1.9+ trillion people and 3,730 systems.

The Empire began as the Republic of Achenar which was founded by the anti-Federation activist Marlin Duval in the Achenar system in 2292. Marlin was a wealthy woman and Federal citizen who became disillusioned of the corruption and increasingly rigid government. She led an expedition into unknown space and colonized the habitable moon Achenar 6d which orbits a gas giant. The republic was prosperous and had a democracy with elected senators. However, Marlin Duval died in a speeder crash in 2296. Her brother Henson Duval took control of the Republic and restructured it into the Empire. Colonization efforts and terraforming on Achenar 6d (now Capitol) led to the extinction of the Mudlarks (native species). The Federation accused the Empire of genocide, while the Empire claimed it was caused by introduced bacteria of the colonists. The Federation used this as a pretext to invade the Achenar system in the Battle of Achenar in 2324. However, Emperor Henson Duval secretly commissioned a battle fleet to stop the invasion. Henson used all civilian and military ships for a counterattack in 2325. The Federal Fleet retreated to Beta Hydri. This established the Empire as a superpower and cemented its independence. The Empire and Federation signed a peace treaty in 2382, but the animosity and a lingering cold war continues. The Empire has a hereditary monarchy, and a rigid hierarchy with legalized slavery. The Imperial Palace is the seat of the Emperor. It's located in the city of Capitol on the planet Capitol in the Achenar system. Imperial society is strictly stratified and based on a cliens system. People can move between strata based on money, patronage and influence. The Empire uses slave labour and clones more than the Federation to be less dependent on technology. The Empire has a population of around 1.65+ trillion people and 4,239 systems in January 3308.

The Alliance was founded by Mick Turner and Meredith Argent in the 33rd century. The resource-rich systems were tired of supporting the conflicts between the Federation and Empire. The 3230 uprising in Alioth lead to the establishment of the Alliance of Independent Systems. This democratic bloc grew as systems revolted from the other superpowers. During the next two decades, 20 systems joined the Alliance for self-determination or protection. They have mutual ideals to promote and safeguard the independent systems from the authoritarian superpowers. It consists of a loose confederation of independent systems. They collaborate via the Alliance Assembly. It has a parliamentary democracy seated in the Alioth system: Garden City on Turner's World, near the old industrial and shipbuilding city of New Rossyth. The Alliance has an elected Prime Minister, but the real power rests with the civil servants and the Council of Admirals. The alliance has around 557 billion people and 1,199 systems in January 3308.

=== Plot ===
The plot of Elite Dangerous begins in the year 3300. It covers events that happened over a decade since the game launched on 16 Dec 2014. The player is a newly licensed pilot of the Pilots Federation with the title of commander. In ED: Odyssey, the player starts at a small settlement called Briscoe's Legacy. The base is powered down and on fire. Power must be restored. After defeating the hostile troops, a pilot in a Cobra Mk IV takes the player to a spaceport. The player receives a loaned Sidewinder Mk I and a few credits, after which they are free to decide their own path, whether as an independent operator, explorer, trader, system architect, etc.

On 19 December 3300, Emperor Hengist Duval decreed in the Senate that his son Prince Harold Duval was not of sound mind and unsuitable to succeed him to the Imperial throne. 5 August 3301 was the wedding day of Emperor Hengist Duval with Florence Lavigny. They were assassinated by Brendan Paul Darius, an aide to Senator Denton Patreus. The heir apparent Prince Harold Duval was assassinated aboard his ship while traveling from Capitol to Cemiess by a member of the Neo-Marlinist Liberation Army on 14 September 3306. Senator Arissa Lavigny-Duval was the illegitimate daughter of Hengist and Florence and crowned Emperor on 18 October 3301.

Federal President Jasmina Halsey and Vice President Ethan Naylor disappeared while aboard Starship One on 26 May 3301. Zachary Hudson was the Federal President between 2 June 3301 - 31 October 3310. Hudson was a longtime friend of Lucas Vincent (former Admiral of the Fleet of the Federal Navy). Vincent was convicted in 3307 of conspiring with Core Dynamics CEO Jupiter Rochester to sabotage Starship One and assassinate former President Jasmina Halsey in 3301. The Federal High Court found Zachary Hudson not guilty since he lacked any involvement, but the scandal hurt his credibility. Hudson lost the presidential election in 3309 and was succeeded by Felicia Winters of the Liberal Party. Hudson retired from Powerplay on 31 October 3310. The Republican Party gained a new leader Jerome Archer from the Nanomam system.

Kahina Tijani Loren (aka Salomé) was an Imperial noble who briefly served as senator of the Prism system. She left her senatorial position to expose a far-reaching conspiracy and shadowy cabal called The Club. She carried vital information from the Formidine Rift back to civilized space during the Salomé event on 29 April 3303. This was a massive player driven event where players attempted to escort the key NPC, Salomé. However, the event was sabotaged by CDMR Besieger (aka Harry Potter) of the Smiling Dog Crew (SDC). He infiltrated the security force and assassinated her. She became a martyr and inspiration for her followers to break The Club's control.

The Ancient Ruins were discovered by CMDR XDeath in the Synuefe XR-H d11-102 system on 27 October 3302. The Guardian Structures with Sentinels and Data Terminals were found since 27 February 3304, thanks to the researcher Ram Tah. These ruins are remnants of a species-wide, interstellar, FTL communications network. They were built by the extinct Guardians.

The Second Thargoid War was between 3308-3310. The cause was a territorial dispute. They constructed 8 huge capital ships called Titans which were hidden inside Maelstroms in 3309. The Thargoids attacked the Core Systems and caused high human casualties and a refugee crisis. The humans won by destroying the Titans. The final Titan Cocijo was destroyed in Sol on 26 May 3310. The outcome of the Thargoid Wars were influenced by the players in the shared narrative. Supercruise Overdrive (SCO) became available after researching Thargoid Titan tech in 3310.

Player driven colonization of star systems began on 26 February 3311 (2025). 75,984 systems were colonized and 277,638 facilities built by 4 October 3311.

In November 3311, Exobiology student Terri Tora accused the system controlling faction October Consortium from hiding something important, but she disappeared a few weeks later. Commanders (players) collected exobiological data from alien trees on the planet for the Exogene Sciences asteroid base. They found a complex bio-chemical compound that may have pharmaceutical applications. The threw superpowers rapidly mobilized their military forces for exclusive control. Community Goals were established for players to fight for their chosen power in the Radicoida War.

== Development ==
At the 2011 Game Developers Conference, following a presentation on the development of the original Elite, Braben was asked in a Q&A session at the 2011 Game Developers Conference if Elite 4 was still on the drawing board. He replied "yes, it would be a tragedy for it not to be". The project had difficulty in attracting sufficient funding, which Braben had attributed to the traditional publishing model, which he saw as being biased against games with no recent comparable predecessors. Space sims were unpopular at the time which made it difficult to secure a publisher. When Frontier Developments greenlit the project there were no other major space games since Freelancer (2003). Braben also found it unacceptable to have a publisher steer development in a particular direction.

Starting in 2012, Elite Dangerous was developed with Frontier Development's own, in-house, Cobra engine. Frontier had been working on the game as a skunk-works background activity for some time prior to its Kickstarter launch, with other projects being prioritised.

Braben had previously discussed crowdfunding as a possible solution in April 2012. Public fundraising commenced on 5 November 2012 using the Kickstarter website, the campaign lasting 60 days, with the aim to raise £1.25m and deliver a finished version of the game by March 2014. Braben described the campaign as a way of "test-marketing the concept to verify there is still interest in such a game that extends beyond the individuals who regularly contact me about the game, and raising the funds to do so." The Kickstarter reached its goal 48 hours before the deadline and exceeded it with 25,681 backers who pledged £1,578,316.

Post-Kickstarter, further public funding was sought through the developer's UK website, via PayPal. By April 2014, £1.7m had been raised, and Braben had reacquired the legal rights to the Elite franchise. Although the game's original total development budget had been £8 million, by September 2014 this had, in Braben's words, "grown by quite a lot".

On 14 November 2014, Braben announced the removal of the game's offline single player mode, because they could not deliver an acceptable offline-only experience based on the original design. In December 2013 a playable alpha version of ED was released to Kickstarter backers who pledged £200. In May 2014, the game entered the first beta test phase, focusing primarily on testing the systems and servers with a greater number of players. A pre-release "gamma" build was released to backers three weeks before launch, to give them a head start on other players.

The full 1.0 version for Windows was released on 16 December 2014. The Elite Dangerous premiere was held in the Imperial War Museum in Cambridgeshire on 22 November 2014. There were interviews, speeches, prizes and a detailed 1:10 scale model of the Cobra Mk III. On 4 March 2015, Microsoft announced at the Game Developers Conference that Elite Dangerous would be released on Xbox One. On 2 April 2015, the beta Mac version went live, accessible to all backers. The Xbox One version early access launched in June 2015 as part of Microsoft's Game Preview program briefing at E3 2015. It was fully released in October 2015. On 2 April 2015, the game was made available on Steam with support for cross-buy between the Windows version and the Mac version, the latter being released in May 2015. Although there are no plans for a Linux version of the game, Braben stated in 2014 that "There is no reason why COBRA cannot run on Linux, running through OpenGL." A version for PlayStation 4 was released on 27 June 2017. Support for the Mac version ended with Update 3.3 on 12 December 2018. ED supports most virtual reality headsets since launch except for the Odyssey on foot activities. In 2017, Frontier announced Tencent had acquired a 9% stake of Frontier Development.

The Elite Dangerous OST was made by composer Erasmus Talbot and Frontier Head of Audio, Jim Croft. The soundtrack is two hours long with 45 songs and 5 themes: Neutral, Federal Space, Imperial Space, Allied Space, Anarchic Space. The album includes an eight-page full colour PDF booklet with sleeve notes of Talbot and Croft. The ED: Odyssey OST was composed by Dan Millidge and released on 29 May 2021. It has a 67-minute runtime and 39 songs with action-packed and calming soundscapes. The albums are available on the Frontier Store.

=== Post-release updates ===
==== Horizons ====
The first "season" of expansions for Elite Dangerous, named Horizons, was announced on 5 August 2015 at Gamescom, entered beta on 30 November 2015 and was released on 15 December 2015 for PC, followed by a 3 June 2016 release for Xbox One. Frontier Developments currently has no plans to release the expansion for Mac OS X unless Apple provides support for compute shaders, which Frontier believes are required to render planet surfaces and other objects. Elite Dangerous: Horizons is a separately priced product. Original customers who also purchased Horizons received exclusive access to the Cobra Mk. IV ship.

Horizons adds planetary landings, ground vehicles and bases, synthesis of consumables and temporary ship upgrades, ship-launched fighters, passenger missions, a character creator, and co-op multicrew support for larger ships. Planetary landings feature procedurally generated planets, initially supporting only worlds without an atmosphere. Players can choose to set down at planetary bases or at any point of their choosing and can deploy a new eight-wheeled ground vehicle called the SRV ("Surface Reconnaissance Vehicle"). This vehicle is equipped with weapons, a "wave scanner" for finding resources, shipwrecks etc., a datalink system for hacking into bases, and thrusters that can lift it off of the ground for short periods of time, depending on the gravity of a world. Thrusters in the wheels can be used to affix it to the ground on worlds with low gravity. Materials found on planets can be combined to boost ship jump range, synthesize repair materials, or upgrade weapons.

Horizons was billed as a season of five expansions, starting with planetary landings and then followed with a more comprehensive looting and crafting system released in May 2016, ship-launched fighters and passenger missions released in October 2016, and support for multiple players working cooperatively on the same ship planned for a future expansion within the first half of 2017 ahead of PlayStation 4 release and with a 5th expansion to follow after that. The 2nd, 3rd and 4th expansions were announced originally for spring, summer and autumn 2016 respectively. But the 5th expansion had no reference to "winter", was not time-scheduled and had no content description, only stating a cryptic "soon" reference.

On 25 October 2016, an extinct alien race, the Guardians, was added, with players allowed to explore the ruins they left behind in order to gather data and materials to unlock special Guardian modules and specialized Human–Guardian hybrid weapons with increased effectiveness against Thargoid ships. Thematically, the Guardians were discovered in the year 3302.

Braben said that Thargoids, the warlike, insectoid aliens from the original games, would make an appearance in some capacity. Mission objectives introduced in May 2015 about ancient specimens fueled speculation of the coming introduction of the Thargoid species. Although wrecks of the Thargoids had already been found in 2016, On 5 January 2017, the first documented sighting of functional Thargoid vessels occurred. While initial Thargoid encounters were non-violent, a number of space stations were since attacked, leading to missions based on investigating, researching, and gathering materials to develop weapons which were designed specifically to combat the Thargoids.

An example of a character on the Holo-Me page in Elite Dangerous.

On 24 February 2017, due to the new discovery in the Trappist-1 system, Update 2.3 would be delayed to put it in the game. Update 2.3 called The Commanders was released on 11 April 2017, five days earlier than originally said. It consists of a 'Commander Creator' (also known as the Holo-Me), Multicrew and various other features. Update 2.4 called "The Return", with an expanded storyline for the alien Thargoids, was released on 26 September 2017.

On 27 October 2020, Horizons was added to the base game as a major update for PC, PlayStation, and Xbox users. People who purchased the expansion before it was free received an exclusive Azure paint job which is compatible with all ships that were available at the time of the update.

==== Elite Dangerous: Arena ====
Simultaneously announced and launched on 16 February 2016, Elite Dangerous: Arena was a low-priced, standalone version of the CQC (Close Quarters Combat) arena mode in Elite Dangerous. It allowed newcomers and existing owners of Elite Dangerous to do arena combat simulation with 4 small ships (F63 Condor, Sidewinder Mk I, Eagle, Imperial Fighter). Ship loadouts can be unlocked and customized. There are 4 arenas which are separate from the regular game modes. The corresponding game mode in Elite Dangerous was renamed from "CQC" to "Arena" on the same day. From 7 to 11 July 2016, the game was offered for free on Steam. On 10 February 2017 it was removed for sale on Steam, but it remains available as a free game mode in ED. The CQC ranks are officially tracked by the Pilots Federation. Thus competing in arena matches is required to earn the Elite rank. The CQC Championship is organized by the fictional Utopixx Entertainment.

==== Beyond ====
Beyond is the official title for the series of updates (3.0 onwards) that followed Horizons. It focused on improvements to the core gameplay along with improvements to the game's crime and punishment system, better trading data, new wing missions, new ships (including the Alliance Chieftain, Krait, and Thargoid scouts), more interaction with megaships and installations, a "tech broker" offering more advanced weapons, in-game Galnet audio, an overhaul of mining, new astronomical anomalies to discover, and improvements to planetary visuals and more detailed surface environments. An open beta for 3.0 was released on 25 January 2018, with official launch of "Chapter One" on 27 February 2018. Subsequent "Chapters" were released across each quarter of 2018 culminating in the release of "Chapter Four" on 11 December 2018 that brought night vision capabilities along with a completely redesigned exploration system, planetary probes, and a Full Spectrum Scanner (FSS) tool for scanning star systems.

On 9 April 2020, Fleet Carriers were added to the game, allowing players to own what are essentially mobile space stations for private use, though they are limited to one per player. They are exorbitantly (though not entirely prohibitively) expensive in terms of in-game currency, owing partially to the fact that they also require periodic refueling stops.

==== Odyssey ====
The Odyssey expansion was announced by Frontier Developments on 3 June 2020 via a video trailer and summary post on their official forums, with launch scheduled for 19 May 2021. The first in-game footage of Odyssey would be shown at The Game Awards 2020 in the form of a minute long gameplay trailer. Referred to as "New Era" in prior communications, full production on Odyssey began in Summer 2018 with a large majority of the Elite development team allocated to it. While this was a paid update for Elite Dangerous base-game owners, Lifetime Expansion owners received it as part of their Pass. It was originally planned for the Elite Dangerous major update to release in December 2020, but in the context of the then current COVID-19 environment, Frontier announced a PC release date of 19 May 2021 on 22 April 2021.

On 13 January 2021, Frontier Developments announced that their release roadmap for Odyssey had shifted as a result of the on-going COVID pandemic: the PC version of Odyssey was now slated to release in late spring 2021, while the PS4 and Xbox One versions had been delayed to autumn 2021.

From 29 March – 5 May 2021, a public alpha build of Odyssey was available. It was split into four phases, with each phase opening more of the game up. In phase 1, players were unable to access their ships, which meant that they were only able to get around using the newly added "Apex Interstellar" taxi service, and they were limited to a single star system. From phase 2 onward, players were able to access ships and could access other star systems. Phase 3 was focused around new exploration features, meaning that players could purchase exploration tools and a Genetic Sampler to study any Flora that they happened upon. Phase 4 imported players' accounts from the main game to test compatibility. The alpha was limited, and a lot of features from the final release of the DLC were cut off. Before the alpha ended, text appeared on screen that said (paraphrased) "See you all on May 19th, So Long, and Thanks for All the Fish!"

On 19 May 2021, Frontier Developments released the DLC on PC. The launch was followed by major issues of client/server stability, several gameplay bugs, and inadequate performance for PC clients stated within the hardware requirements. It resulted in a "Mostly Negative" global review on Steam store. Players also complained widely on both Steam and the official forum about a steep increase in time to collect instrumental resources, broken mechanics, and missing end game activities. Frontier Developments have subsequently released 7 major updates with the first 5 released on a weekly schedule. These focused on stability and bug fixes, with critical performance issues left to be addressed in later updates in the run up to the planned console release.

Odyssey adds first-person features on planetary surfaces and inside bases to the game. The player can traverse these environments on-foot while wearing a space suit. On-foot gameplay has survival mechanics such as health, oxygen, energy and coordinates which are indicated in the head-up display. Odyssey's first person mode does not support virtual reality headsets.

On 4 June 2021, Frontier Developments announced the focus of Updates 3, 4 and 5, postponing the performance optimization to following console related development.

On 12 July 2021, Frontier Developments announced that console release had been delayed indefinitely. Later, on 10 March 2022, Frontier CEO David Braben announced on the company's forums that all further content development for console versions of Elite Dangerous was being cancelled, citing the need to move the game's story forward by focusing on one post-Odyssey codebase.

On 29 July 2021, Frontier Developments released Update 6 with declared corrections to missions, POIs, interface problems, and the addition of AMD's FSR technology to address in minor measure performance issues for affected hardware configurations by downgrading and then scaling the effective resolution. This update introduced new severe issues (e.g. certain mission types weren't available in stations, and certain engineering unlocks were inaccessible for some users, and players would occasionally be charged for weapon modifications that weren't actually applied to the ship) and did little to address long-standing critical performance issues.

On 7 September 2021, Frontier Developments released an Issue Report announcing at the same time the focus of the Updates 7 and 8 while postponing to 2022 the addressing of some major issues, including problems with anti-aliasing and a limited framerate.

On 22 September 2021, Frontier Developments released Update 7 after being postponed for several weeks, which fixed many outstanding issues, added quality of life changes, and optimized some game features. Previous performance issues remained unresolved, but Frontier Development's official update notes would mention "tweaks made to hopefully positively contribute toward current player performance issues".

The game's main alien race, the Thargoids, invaded the bubble of colonized space in the galaxy in 2023. The Thargoids would deploy eight of their motherships, officially known as Thargoid Titans (though popularly referred to as the shorter Titans), which added several new types of Thargoid vessel (which some have not reappeared after the destruction of all Titans), and made anti-xeno activities much more accessible for the time the invasion was still ongoing. New modules were added to the game, such as the Guardian Nanite Torpedo Pylon which was designed to prevent the Titans from venting the heat they would generate. This forced the vulnerable core to be exposed in an effort to vent the heat, which would allow the destruction of the Titans.

An alternative variant of the Frame-Shift Drive, the game's method of faster-than-light travel, was developed by integrating Thargoid Titan technology into human components. The Supercruise Overcharge (SCO), as it's called, vastly increased the speed of travel at the cost of lessened stability, excessive heat buildup, and immense fuel usage, all of which are significantly larger issues in ships not designed for the technology. Eight new ships have been released since, all of which were designed for the technology, though with varying degrees of efficiency: Python Mk II (combat), Type-8 (cargo), Mandalay (exploration), Caspian Explorer (exploration), Cobra Mk V and Corsair (multipurpose), Panther Clipper MK II (cargo) and Type-11 Prospector (early access, mining).

In the Frontier Unlocked livestream on 20 October, 2024, a new feature, system colonisation, was first announced. Players can claim star systems and develop a colony by building ground facilities and space stations. The beta version was released on 28 February 2025. It exited beta for full release on 11 Nov 2025.

== Reception ==
Reception

Aggregate score
Aggregator	Score
Metacritic	(PC) 80/100 (XONE) 80/100 (PS4) 77/100

Review scores
Publication	Score
Destructoid	(PS4) 9/10
Eurogamer	8/10
GamesRadar+	4/5
IGN	7.4/10
PC Gamer (UK)	86/100
PlayStation LifeStyle	(PS4) 9/10
Eurogamer Germany	9/10
Hooked Gamers	90/100
Pelit	90/100
GamesMaster UK	88/100
Gamer.nl	85
Multiplayer.it	85/100
CD-Action	85/100
VentureBeat	83/100
HobbyConsolas	83/100
MeriStation	82/100
Metro	7/10

=== Critical response ===
Elite Dangerous received an aggregated score of 80/100 on Metacritic based on 55 critics, indicating that the game received "generally favorable reviews" (84% positive) from critics.

Chris Thursten of PC Gamer rated the game 86/100, considering it to be "potentially a classic", depending on Frontier's ability to build on the "broad but somewhat shallow foundations" of the released version. Thursten described the gameplay experience as "exhilarating excitement, matched by nothing else this year, contrasted with moments of emptiness, frustration, and boredom". Dan Whitehead of Eurogamer gave the game 8/10 and considered it to be "probably the most immersive and compelling recreation of deep space ever seen in gaming", while finding some of the gameplay repetitive. Andy Kelly of GamesRadar gave the game 4/5, calling it a "compelling space sandbox" and a "welcome return" of the Elite franchise, but felt that the game at launch was "missing a lot of important features, especially when it comes to multiplayer". Roger Hargreaves of the Metro gave it 7/10, describing the game as a "solid start" that had yet to fulfil its potential. Reviewing the game for IGN, Rob Zacny called it "one of the most enthralling and evocative space combat and trade sim games I've ever played" and "also one of the most boring", seeing the balance of "brief, intense emotional peaks and long, shallow valleys of boredom" as "fundamental to Elite's identity". Reviewing a later version of the game in April 2015, after playing the game since launch, Lee Hutchinson from Ars Technica described Elite Dangerous as "so damn good that it transcends its problems". Joel Peterson of Destructoid gave the PlayStation 4 version of the game 9/10, calling it "A hallmark of excellence. There may be flaws, but they are negligible and won't cause massive damage."

The announcement of the removal of the offline mode on 14 November 2014 was met by a number of complaints from customers, with some saying they had backed the game on the understanding that it would feature offline play and others that there had been no prior warning of removal during the whole of the preceding development period. Frontier offered refunds to customers who had pre-ordered the game without playing it, and said that those who had already played the game, in alpha or beta form, would not be eligible for refunds. Later, Braben, speaking for the company, announced that refunds would be judged on a "case-by-case" basis.

Elite Dangerous won "Best of E3" from The Escapist and games.cz in 2014. Elite Dangerous won the Game Developers Choice Award 2015 for best audience. During the 18th Annual D.I.C.E. Awards, the Academy of Interactive Arts & Sciences nominated Elite Dangerous for "Outstanding Achievement in Online Gameplay". It was ranked as the Best VR Game of 2016 from Game Revolution. It was nominated for Evolving Game by the British Academy Games Awards (BAFTA) in 2017. The game was also nominated for the "Still Playing" award at the 2019 Golden Joystick Awards. Elite Dangerous: Beyond was nominated for "Evolving Game" at the 2019 British Academy Games Awards. The astronomy news website Space.com ranked Elite Dangerous as the best space flight simulation game of 2025.

=== Sales ===
By the end of April 2015, Elite Dangerous had sold more than 500,000 copies, with Frontier Developments expected to generate £22 million from sales. The game had sold around 1.7 million units by the end of May 2016. By the end of December 2016 over 2.1 million paid franchise units were sold of Elite Dangerous. On 15 January 2019, cumulative sales of Elite Dangerous exceeded 4.3 million franchise units, composed of 3 million base game units and 1.3 million Horizons expansion units. In April 2020 the sales of Elite Dangerous base game units had passed 3.5 million. During an interview published on 23 October 2020, Frontier CFO Alex Bevis announced that Elite Dangerous had generated more than £100 million of revenue. By September 2022, over 4.8 million base game units were sold.

== See also ==
- List of space flight simulation games
- Elite (video game series)
- Star Citizen
