= Ian Bell (programmer) =

British computer programmer (born 1962)

- Born: Ian Colin Graham Bell; 31 October 1962 (age 63); Hatfield, Hertfordshire, England
- Education: Jesus College, Cambridge (BA, Dipl.)
- Occupations: Software engineer, game developer
- Known for: Developer of Elite

Ian Colin Graham Bell (born 31 October 1962 in Hatfield, Hertfordshire) programmed and designed the video game Elite (1984) with David Braben, which met with much acclaim.

== Education ==
Bell attended the independent St Albans School. He studied at Jesus College, Cambridge, graduating with a degree (1st) in Mathematics in 1985, and a Cambridge Diploma in Computer Science in 1986.

== Career ==
=== Game development ===
His work on Elite (1984) included programming in assembly language. The game is based on an open-ended non-linear game model, and the 3D graphics were revolutionary at the time. Prior to Elite, he developed Free Fall, a game set inside a coriolis space station with the player controlling an alien punching astronaut, described by Bell as "the first ever Beat 'em up". Free Fall, also a game for the BBC Micro, was published by Acornsoft in 1983. Bell put later Free Fall and Elite with the associated source code for free download on his website.

Bell was a speaker at the 2009 GameCity game festival. Bell mentioned in his speech about the impact of games:

You're reaching into the minds and the imaginary spaces of children, and you're to an extent shaping their characters and their life stories. I'm glad [Elite] isn't Doom because I'm glad that even though we didn't really think in these terms, I think its effect on players and on people's lives is good, both in the sense of giving them good memories but also in making people think in different ways and awakening interest.

=== Subsequent career ===
After the initial success of Elite and having completed ports of it to the Commodore 64 (1985), Apple II (1986), and NES (1991), Bell spent a number of years undertaking personal research. In 2008 he joined Autodesk as a Senior Software Engineer. As of 2024 he was still working in Computer Aided Design.
