= Elite (video game) =

1984 video game

- Cover art for Firebird releases
- Developers: David Braben; Ian Bell
- Publishers: Acornsoft (Acorn/BBC); Firebird (ports); Imagineer
- Composers: Aidan Bell; David Whittaker (NES); Wally Beben (ports); Julie Dunn (C64)
- Series: Elite
- Platforms: BBC Micro; Acorn Electron; Apple II; Amstrad CPC; Commodore 64; ZX Spectrum; MSX; Tatung Einstein; MS-DOS; Archimedes; Amiga; Atari ST; NES (PAL)
- Release: 20 September 1984
- Genre: Space trading and combat simulator
- Mode: Single-player

Elite is a space trading video game. It was written and developed by David Braben and Ian Bell and was originally published by Acornsoft for the BBC Micro computer in September 1984. Elite's open-ended game model, and revolutionary 3D graphics led to it being ported to virtually every contemporary home computer system and earned it a place as a classic and a genre maker in gaming history. The game's title derives from one of the player's goals of raising their combat rating to the exalted heights of "Elite".

Elite was one of the first home computer games to use wire-frame 3D graphics with hidden-line removal. It added graphics and twitch gameplay aspects to the genre established by the 1974 game Star Trader. Another novelty was the inclusion of The Dark Wheel, a novella by Robert Holdstock which gave players insight into the moral and legal codes to which they might aspire.

The first game was followed by the sequels Frontier: Elite II in 1993, and Frontier: First Encounters in 1995, which introduced Newtonian physics, realistic star systems, and seamless freeform planetary landings. The third sequel Elite Dangerous launched on 16 December 2014. It introduced massively multiplayer with an ongoing narrative, first-person on-foot gameplay and space colonisation. ED received several seasons of free content updates and two paid expansions: Horizons in 2015 and Odyssey in 2021. The Elite series holds the Guinness World Record as the longest running space simulation series in history.

Elite proved hugely influential, serving as a model for other games including Wing Commander: Privateer, Grand Theft Auto, EVE Online, Freelancer, the X series and No Man's Sky.

Non-Acorn versions were each first published by Firebird and Imagineer. Subsequently, Frontier Developments has claimed the game to be a "Game by Frontier" to be part of its own back catalogue and all the rights to the game have been owned by David Braben.

== Gameplay ==
The BBC Micro version of Elite, showing the player approaching a Coriolis space station

The player initially controls the character "Commander Jameson", though the name can be changed each time the game is saved. The player starts at Lave Station with 100 credits and a lightly armed trading ship, a Cobra Mark III. Most of the ships that the player encounters are similarly named after snakes or other reptiles. Credits can be accumulated through a number of means. These include piracy, trade, military missions, bounty hunting and asteroid mining. The money generated by these enterprises allows the player to upgrade their ship with enhancements such as better weapons, increased cargo capacity, an automated docking system, an extra energy bank and more.

In the game universe, stars have single planets, each with a space station in its orbit. Stars are always separated by interstellar distances which cannot be crossed using the ship's sublight engines. Travel between stars is accomplished by hyperspace jumps, and is constrained to those within range of the limited fuel capacity (a maximum of 7 light years) of the ship's hyperdrive. Sublight travel uses no fuel.

Fuel can be replenished after docking with a space station, which requires matching the ship's rotation to that of the station before entering the docking bay—a task that can be avoided by purchasing a docking computer. Equipment upgrades include a fuel scoop, which allows "sun skimming"—collecting energy from the stars' corona—described by the manual as "a dangerous and difficult activity", but in practice a fairly simple process far easier than manually docking at a space station—and collecting free-floating cargo canisters and escape capsules liberated after the destruction of other ships.

While making a hyperspace jump between star systems, the antagonistic Thargoid race may intercept the player half way, forcing the player's ship to remain in "witch-space" and do battle with the smaller invasion ships of the Thargoid. As the interrupted jump uses the full journey's fuel, the player may have insufficient fuel to subsequently jump to a nearby planet, trapping them in witch-space. They must either use an escape capsule, if owned, or abort the game and reload.

An extremely expensive one-time galactic hyperspace upgrade permits travel between the eight galaxies of the game universe. There is little practical difference between the different galaxies. However, in some versions it is necessary to travel to at least the second galaxy to access the game's missions. The planetary layout of the galaxies is different, and many players have discovered trade routes between closely positioned planets with fortuitous economic combinations.

Most versions of Elite included several optional jobs for the Galactic Navy. One requires tracking down and destroying a stolen experimental ship; another involves transporting classified information on the Thargoids' home planet, with Thargoid invasion ships doing their best to see that the player does not succeed throughout the duration of the mission involving multiple interplanetary jumps. Rewards differed depending on the mission - from cash and gems to esoteric hardware such as a cloaking device.

== Development ==
According to Braben and Bell, Elite was inspired by a number of sources. The developers refer to 2001: A Space Odyssey, Star Wars, The Hitchhiker's Guide to the Galaxy and the original Battlestar Galactica as influences. Braben also cites the works of Larry Niven, Jerry Pournelle, Arthur C. Clarke, Robert L. Forward, Isaac Asimov and Orson Scott Card. While both have confirmed that the default commander name Jameson was inspired by the Traveller tabletop role-playing game which Bell played, Braben has denied that substantial parts were derived from it.

When the developers met at Jesus College, Cambridge, Bell was already working on a game for Acornsoft called Freefall. Braben had started writing a game called Fighter, but had not yet completed it. The two projects were sufficiently similar that after comparing notes and seeing Star Raiders on the Atari 800 they decided to collaborate to produce what eventually became Elite. They first approached Thorn EMI; the company's rejection letter stated that the game was too complicated and needed to be finishable in 10 minutes with three lives. Braben and Bell then met with Acornsoft; their demo of Elite's combat and docking sequences impressed managing director David Johnson-Davies and other Acornsoft executives. The company agreed to publish the finished game, although they feared that it was too ambitious for Braben and Bell, and was uncertain about the merits of two developers instead of one on a single game. The programmers were given a £1,000 advance from the company and a royalty rate of 7.5% was agreed.

The game took two years to write and started out as a 3D arcade game without the trading element. It was written in machine code using assembly language, giving much care to maximum compactness of the code. The last part added was the 3D radar display fitted into the last few unused bytes in their computer.

The original BBC version used a novel split screen approach to show four colours (five, including the black background) onscreen simultaneously; the upper two thirds of the screen were displayed in Mode 4 while the lower part was in Mode 5. The subsequent Electron version ran entirely in Mode 4, because the video chips were not 100% compatible and therefore were in black and white only.

The Elite universe contains eight galaxies, each with 256 planets to explore. Due to the limited capabilities of 8-bit computers, these worlds are procedurally generated. A single seed number is run through a fixed algorithm the appropriate number of times and creates a sequence of numbers determining each planet's complete composition (position in the galaxy, prices of commodities, and name and local details; text strings are chosen numerically from a lookup table and assembled to produce unique descriptions, such as a planet with "carnivorous arts graduates"). This means that no extra memory is needed to store the characteristics of each planet, yet each is unique and has fixed properties. Each galaxy is also procedurally generated from the first. Braben and Bell at first intended to have 2^{48} galaxies, but Acornsoft insisted on a smaller universe to hide the galaxies' mathematical origins.

However, the use of procedural generation created a few problems. There are a number of poorly located systems that can be reached only by galactic hyperspace— these are more than 7 light years from their nearest neighbour, and, being low-tech, are unable to replace the galactic hyperdrive, thus trapping the traveller. Braben and Bell also checked that none of the system names were profane - removing an entire galaxy after finding a planet named "Arse".

The developers did not spend much time playing their creation, and the quality testing was mostly performed by Acornsoft's managing director David Johnson-Davies, who also planned the packaging and marketing campaign at the time.

The original "Elite" logo was created by Philip Castle. Braben said, "The Elite logo took a while to get right. The inspiration was a mix of pilot's wings and logo. The Griffin thing was Philip Castle's idea."

The original BBC Micro disk version uses a non-standard disk-format for copy protection. This relied on specific OSWORD &7F DFS opcodes in the Intel 8271 floppy-disk controller to directly access the disk, and produce a non-standard sector/track-layout. This causes issues for legitimate customers that use the Western Digital 1770 disk-controller (DFS) ROMs from third-party manufacturers such as Watford Electronics. Acorn subsequently released alternative versions of the BBC disks that are compatible with the WD1770. In addition to this, self-modifying code was used as part of the protection system, created by Rob Northen. This BBC disk-copy-protection was also used by Superior Software in its Exile game.

== Marketing and release ==
The Dark Wheel
- Original Acornsoft cover
- Author: Robert Holdstock
- Language: English
- Genre: Science fiction
- Publisher: Acornsoft, Firebird Software
- Publication date: 1984
- Publication place: United Kingdom
- Media type: Paperback

Acornsoft set in motion a large-scale publicity campaign and commissioned a presentational package for the game that was far more elaborate than normal. Acornsoft packaged Elite in a box larger than its usual releases, complete with a novella by Robert Holdstock called The Dark Wheel, a 64-page Space Trader's Flight Training Manual, reference card and a ship identification poster. The flight training manual was written in a style that took the rookie trader through the controls and various aspects of play.

The original Acornsoft version of The Dark Wheel promised on its back cover that "[a] sequel to the novella is planned for publication in 1985", but no direct sequel was ever written. A second novella, Imprint by Andy Redman, was included with the IBM PC release of Elite Plus, but apart from being set in the same universe it is in no way connected to the original story.

Marketing activities included a £50,000 promotional budget from Acornsoft, including television advertising and a launch party at the Thorpe Park theme park (holding such an event for a video game was almost unheard of at the time) and a competition to be among the first to achieve the status of "Elite".

=== The Dark Wheel ===
The story tells of a young starship pilot named Alex Ryder, whose father Jason is killed when their merchant ship is attacked by a notorious pirate. In trying to understand and avenge his father's death and achieve an "iron ass" (a space-trader's term for a well-armed- and armoured spaceship), Alex encounters the basics of the Elite universe—including combat, hyperdrive and hyperspace and the deadly aliens called Thargoids. Finally Alex discovers the truth about his father and his combat rank. He also acts as an acceptable face of trading as his female co-pilot, Elyssia Fields, is an alien and wanted in several systems. Alex wants to avenge his father's death, but must exercise caution in tracking down the assassin. By trading commodities, he slowly improves the arms and armour of his ship. When he is competent at using the spaceship for combat, but before he feels ready, he makes a trade that is sure to bring his father's killer to him.

Alex also learns what the "Dark Wheel" is and what it takes to join its ranks.

== Versions ==
Enhanced graphics in the Archimedes version of Elite, showing several Viper-class police ships flying in formation and a planet in lower-right corner

The first version of the game was released for the BBC Micro, model B on tape and disk and "about a month or two later" the Acorn Electron tape version was released. The Electron's limitations meant the game was in black and white only, and several game features were cut including Thargoids and suns. Neither the BBC nor the Electron tape versions featured missions. Additionally, the original tape version for the Electron contained a bug that stopped Galactic Hyperspace from working. Acorn provided a mail-in tape-replacement service to upgrade to v1.1 (marked as such on the tape label) that fixed this bug.

A version for the BBC Micro with the 6502 Second Processor was announced by Acornsoft on 25 July 1985, this new version added several extras over the standard BBC version, including 18 ships in the player environment (up from 10), no loading from disc when leaving/arriving at a space station, the ability to save screenshots and print screens to an Epson compatible printer. It also boasted over double the frame rate and a MODE1/MODE2 split screen vs. MODE4/MODE5 giving a full colour game for the first time.

The great commercial success of the BBC Micro version prompted a bidding war for the rights to publish Elite in other formats, which British Telecom's software arm, Telecomsoft, eventually won.

Contemporary versions for home computers based on the 6502 microprocessor were ported by either Bell or Bell and Braben. The Commodore 64 conversion introduced Trumbles (creatures based on the tribbles in Star Trek: The Original Series). When the docking computer is activated in the Commodore 64 version and some other versions, a musical rendition of "The Blue Danube" Waltz is played, as a nod to a space docking sequence in Stanley Kubrick's 1968 film 2001: A Space Odyssey.

1985 ZX Spectrum port, by Firebird Software

The ZX Spectrum version, programmed by "Torus" included a supernova mission not found in the original.

The Amstrad CPC conversion has fewer ships than other platforms, lacking the Anaconda and Transport, along with some minor differences in missions and titles. Ricardo Pinto, the programmer for the Amstrad version, explained that his team was given a 6502 hex dump by Braben and Bell, which did not help development: "In the end we wrote our version by playing Elite on a [BBC Micro] and making ours look the same." This version included the "supernova rescue" and "cloaking device" missions, and refinements to the launch tube and jump drive animations.

According to the lead programmer of the 16 bit Amiga/Atari ST and the MSX conversions Rob Nicholson, he did not have access to the source code because of contractual issues and had to write them "blind". All he had were the ship shapes and the procedural generation code for the galaxies.

Elite Plus was released for MS-DOS in 1991. Whereas the original Elite (1987) for the PC used CGA graphics, Elite Plus was upgraded to take advantage of EGA, VGA and MCGA. It was coded entirely in assembly language by Chris Sawyer, who later wrote RollerCoaster Tycoon.

The Acorn Archimedes version, ArcElite (1991), written by Warren Burch & Clive Gringras and regarded by Stuff magazine as the best conversion of the original game, added intelligent opponents who engage in their own private battles and police who take an active interest in protecting the law. As well as such gameplay enhancements, the version also exploited the more modern hardware by using polygon mesh graphics in place of the wire-frames. The game world no longer seems to be centred around the player; freighter fleets with escorts go about their own business, pirate formations patrol lawless systems looking for cargo to loot and mining ships can often be found breaking up asteroids for their mineral content. Unlike the mythical Generation Ships of the original, rare occurrences of other non-pirate entities mentioned in the manual really can be found in the Archimedes version: geometric formations of space beacons; hermits living among the asteroids; abandoned ships towed by police (although Dredgers and Generation Ships are confirmed not to exist in Archimedes Elite). The Archimedes version of Elite was originally written to be a space trading game called Trojan - however the obvious similarities eventually meant that to avoid a potential lawsuit Trojan had to become an official Elite conversion. ArcElite was one of a number of games released for free by The Icon Bar website in 2006.

Some versions feature a new title, "Archangel", for the player to earn that substitutes the rank of Commander. Archangel is reached by undertaking a special mission to destroy a space station in a system invaded by the Thargoids. The player's reward for completing the mission is to receive the title Archangel and obtain a device that is capable of emulating anti-ECM broadcast.

Versions for 32X and Sega Mega Drive were in development but cancelled due to Sony backing out of the project and lack of publisher. However, a ROM image of the Mega Drive demo was released online by co-designer Ian Bell.

== Reception ==
Reception

Review scores
Publication	Score
Amtix	CPC: 94%
Crash	ZX:92%
Computer and Video Games	C64: 36/40 ZX: 37/40 Atari ST: 82%
M! Games	85/100 (Amiga)
Sinclair User	ZX: 5/5
Your Sinclair	ZX:9/10
Amstrad Action	CPC: 94%
BEEBUG	BBC: 5/5
Personal Computer Games	BBC: 9/10
Super Gamer	NES: 80%
Zzap!64	C64: 97% Amiga: 98%

Awards
Publication	Award
Golden Joystick Award	"Best Original Game" (1984)
Crash	Readers' Awards "Best Game Overall" (1985)
Computer Gamer	"Game of the Year", "Best Arcade Game" (1985)
Next Generation Magazine	#1 "best game of the 1980s" (2008)
IGN	#12 "Top 25 PC Games of All Time" (2000)
Retro Gamer	#1 "Top 100 Retro Game" (2004)
Times Online	#3 most influential video game ever. (2007)
Stuff	#6 "100 Greatest Games" (2008)
Telespiele trade show	One of the 16 most influential games in history. (2007)

Elite received very positive reviews on its launch and the BBC Micro version eventually sold 107,898 copies. The game's popularity became a national phenomenon in the UK, with reports airing on Channel 4 and elsewhere. Elite was Firebird's best-selling Commodore game as of late 1987. Bell estimates that approximately 600,000 copies were eventually sold for all platforms combined, while Frontier Developments' Elite page states that the numbers are around a million units.

Elite's technical breakthroughs reportedly amazed the BBC Micro's developers, with Sophie Wilson calling it "the game that couldn't have been written". However, many players found gameplay difficult and unfamiliar; the game was so controversial that The Micro User devoted its April 1985 letter column to readers debating it.

In his review of the game for Beebug Magazine in 1984, David Fell called Elite "the best game ever" for the BBC Micro. In Personal Computer Games Shingo Sugiura said "Elite is vast, complex and very, very absorbing. I've got bulging, red eyeballs from staying up into the early hours but I don't care. I'm going to continue playing until I am ranked Elite ... or at least Competent ... or even Average ... Buy it!". John Cook wrote in the December 1984 issue of Micro Adventurer "A masterpiece such as this is difficult to describe within existing parameters" and "By any standards, Elite is an excellent game, certainly in the Top Three this year. By BBC standards, it is simply the best game that has ever been written for the machine". Crash magazine said about the Spectrum version "Elite is one of the most imaginative ever to be designed to run on a home computer" and gave it a score of 92%, while at the same time it was a best-seller in the Gallup charts. The game was number 16 in the Your Sinclair "Top 100 Speccy Games" in 1992, was voted number 7 in the Your Sinclair "Readers' Top 100 Games of All Time" in 1993 and was voted the 9th best game of all time by the readers of Retro Gamer Magazine for an article that was scheduled to be in a special Your Sinclair tribute issue. Similarly Zzap!64 gave the Commodore 64 version 97%, stating that it was "a brilliant game of blasting and trading and is certainly the best game I've seen this year" in 1985 and the Amiga version 98% in 1989.

In 1984, Elite received the Golden Joystick Award for "Best Original Game". In 1985 the game was awarded the "Best Game Overall" for that year by readers of Crash magazine, and "Game of the Year" by Computer Gamer. In a 1992 survey of science fiction games, Computer Gaming World gave the title two of five stars, stating that its "popularity was largely a result of being one of the first space games with a 'large' universe to explore". The magazine gave Elite Plus two-plus stars, describing it as "More detailed and complex, it is also more tedious than the original". A 1994 survey of strategic space games set in the year 2000 and later gave Elite and Elite Plus three stars and two-plus stars, respectively.

In 1993, Commodore Force ranked the game at number four on its list of the top 100 Commodore 64 games. It was ranked #14 top game of all time by Next Generation in 1996, #12 on IGN's 2000 "Top 25 PC Games of All Time" list, the #3 most influential video game ever by the Times Online in 2007, #6 "Greatest Game" by Stuff magazine in 2008, #1 "Top Retro Game" by Retro Gamer in 2004, and #1 "best game of the 1980s" by Next Generation in 2008. In 1996, GamesMaster ranked Elite 11th on their "Top 100 Games of All Time." The game was retrospectively awarded 10/10 by the multi-format magazine Edge—together with only 2 other games— and is being exhibited at such places as the London Science Museum in the "Game On" exhibition organised and toured by the Barbican Art Gallery. Elite is also featured in Game On! From Pong to Oblivion: The 50 Greatest Video Games of All Time by authors Simon Byron, Ste Curran and David McCarthy.

In 1991, PC Format placed Elite Plus on its list of the 50 best computer games of all time. The editors called it "a classic game that mixes solid 3D space combat with trading to create a universe in which you can spend many a happy half-hour bushwhacking the dastardly Thargoids."

== Impact ==
Elite has often been regarded as defining the genre for space trading games. Since its release Elite has been credited as being the title that defined the modern space flight simulation genre, a significant source of inspiration for later games in the genre as well as being influential upon gaming as a whole. In interviews, senior producers of CCP Games have cited Elite as one of the inspirations for their acclaimed MMORPG, EVE Online. The developers of Jumpgate Evolution, Battlecruiser 3000AD, Infinity: The Quest for Earth, Space Rangers, Hard Truck: Apocalyptic Wars and Flatspace have likewise all credited Elite as a source of inspiration. Similar praise has been bestowed elsewhere in the media over the years.

Elite has been described as one of the most influential games in history, and has been credited with pioneering open-ended game design. Computer and Video Games also identified it as an early example of the open world game format. It has also been cited as helping to pave the way for later online persistent worlds such as Second Life and World of Warcraft.

Elite has frequently been suggested as a candidate for a remake. Several retrospective sources have continued to rank it highly within the space-trading genre, including in comparisons with later games and its immediate sequel.

== Legacy ==
In the late 1980s, a variant of the commercial BBC Micro Elite release was created by Angus Duggan by disassembling and modifying the 6502 code from the existing with many extra features, originally titled Elite III but now known as Elite A to minimise confusion. It includes many more ship types, more ship types flyable by the player (who begins in the less capable Adder), cargo delivery missions, some extra equipment items and numerous gameplay improvements. Elite A was released publicly in 1997. Like the original game, it can be downloaded free from Ian Bell's web site and played under emulation.

In November 1999, on the game's 15th birthday, Ian Bell released many binaries and source code of several versions of the original game on his website. A dispute arose between Bell and David Braben regarding Bell's decision to make available all versions of the original Elite. The dispute has since ended and the various versions became available again on Bell's site.

Around 1999 Christian Pinder developed Elite: The New Kind as a modern PC port of the original BBC Micro version. He achieved a faithful port by reverse-engineering the original assembly written BBC Micro version and recreating a platform neutral C code variant from it, but at David Braben's request this version was withdrawn from distribution in 2003.

The open source Oolite (initially for Mac OSX but with stable Linux and Windows ports by 2006) started its development in 2004 by Giles Williams. Applying a mod facilitated framework, the game sustains a user community and has remained in development growth through a succession of developers over the 20 years since.

Another adaptation is 1337 (meaning "Elite" in Leetspeak) developed by Jose Maria Enguita for the Oric machines, that won the 2010 Oldschool Gaming Game Of The Year Award.

On 20 October 2013, the Internet Archive started to offer Elite in the ZX Spectrum version for online playing in the browser via MESS emulation.

In September 2014, on Elite's 30th birthday, Ian Bell blessed Elite: The New Kind and re-released it for free on his website. Since then, Elite: The New Kind is also distributed again in version 1.1 by Christian Pinder; a source code mirror is hosted on GitHub.

In 2015, Guinness World Records awarded Elite (1984) as the first game to feature a procedurally generated world.

In 2020, Christian Pinder also released an upscaled Windows port of the Acorn Archimedes' Elite.

== See also ==
- History of video games
- Cosmonautica
- Escape Velocity Nova
- Starflight

== Literature ==
- Masters of their universe - an excerpt on Guardian.co.uk from Backroom Boys: The Secret Return Of The British Boffin, by Francis Spufford, ISBN 9780571214969 (18 October 2003).
- Gamasutra's The History of Elite: Space, The Endless Frontier by Bill Loguidice and Matt Barton (7 April 2009).
- GDC 2011 presentation Postmortem of Elite by David Braben (2011)
