= List of theme park management video games =

The following are video games dedicated to the management or simulation of theme parks.

== Construction simulators ==
Many titles are construction and management simulation games. Players must construct roller coasters and sometimes other fairground attractions in order to attract visitors to their fairgrounds or otherwise achieve their goals.

| Year | Game | Platform | Developer | Publisher | Notes |
|---|---|---|---|---|---|
| 1993 | Coaster | MS-DOS | Code To Go | Walt Disney Computer Software, Inc. | |
| 1994 | Theme Park | MS-DOS, Amiga, 3DO, Sega Genesis, Sega CD, Amiga CD32, Mac OS, Atari Jaguar, FM Towns, Sega Saturn, PlayStation, SNES, Nintendo DS, iOS | Bullfrog Productions | Electronic Arts | |
| 1999 | RollerCoaster Tycoon | Windows, Xbox | Chris Sawyer Productions | Hasbro Interactive, MicroProse, Infogrames | Includes two expansion packs: Added Attractions (Corkscrew Follies in the United States) and Loopy Landscapes. |
| 1999 | Coaster Works | Dreamcast | Bottom Up, Bimboosoft | Xicat Interactive, Inc. | |
| 1999 | Theme Park World | PlayStation, Windows, Mac OS, PlayStation 2 | Bullfrog Productions | Electronic Arts | |
| 2000 | Legoland | Windows | Krisalis | Electronic Arts | |
| 2001 | NoLimits | Windows, macOS | Ole Lange | Mad Data GmbH & Co. KG | |
| 2001 | Theme Park Inc | Windows | Bullfrog Productions | Electronic Arts | |
| 2001 | Ultimate Ride | Windows | Gigawatt Studios, Disney Imagineering | Disney Interactive Studios | |
| 2002 | RollerCoaster Tycoon 2 | Windows | Chris Sawyer Productions | Infogrames | Includes two expansion packs: Wacky Worlds and Time Twister. Both of these are developed by Frontier Developments. |
| 2004 | RollerCoaster Tycoon 3 | Windows, macOS, iOS, Nintendo Switch | Frontier Developments | Atari, Inc., Aspyr Media, Frontier Developments | Includes two expansion packs: Soaked and Wild. |
| 2006 | Thrillville | PlayStation 2, PlayStation Portable | Frontier Developments | LucasArts | |
| 2007 | Thrillville: Off the Rails | Nintendo DS, Wii, Xbox 360, PlayStation Portable, PlayStation 2, Microsoft Windows | Frontier Developments | LucasArts | |
| 2008 | Efteling Tycoon | Windows | Dartmoor Softworks, HexArts Entertainment | Atari Benelux | |
| 2011 | Rollercoaster Mania | Facebook | Noisy Duck | Noisy Duck | Based on Theme Park |
| 2012 | RollerCoaster Tycoon 3D | 3DS | n-Space | Atari, Inc. | |
| 2014 | NoLimits 2 | Windows | Ole Lange | Mad Data GmbH & Co. KG | |
| 2014 | RollerCoaster Tycoon 4 Mobile | iOS, Android | On 5 Games | Atari, Inc. | |
| 2016 | RollerCoaster Tycoon World | Windows | Nvizzio Creations | Atari, Inc. | |
| 2016 | Planet Coaster | Windows, macOS, PlayStation 4, PlayStation 5, Xbox One, Xbox Series X/S | Frontier Developments | Frontier Developments | |
| 2016 | Theme Park Studio | Windows | Pantera Entertainment | Pantera Entertainment | |
| 2016 | RollerCoaster Tycoon Classic | iOS, Android | Origin8 Technologies | Atari, Inc. | |
| 2017 | RollerCoaster Tycoon Touch | iOS, Android | | Atari, Inc. | |
| 2018 | Parkitect | Windows, macOS, Linux | Texel Raptor | Texel Raptor | |
| 2018 | RollerCoaster Tycoon Adventures | Nintendo Switch | Nvizzio Creations | Atari, Inc. | |
| 2023 | Park Beyond | Windows, PlayStation 5, Xbox Series X/S | Limbic Entertainment | Bandai Namco Entertainment | |
| 2024 | Planet Coaster 2 | Microsoft Windows, PlayStation 5, Xbox Series X/S | Frontier Developments | Frontier Developments | |
| 2025 | Waterpark Simulator | Microsoft Windows, Steam | Cayplay | Cayplay | |

== Roller coaster games in other genres ==
Some video games concerned with roller coasters belong to other video game genres, these are listed below.

| Year | Game | Platform | Genre | Developer | Publisher | Notes |
|---|---|---|---|---|---|---|
| 1983 | 3D Crazy Coaster | Vectrex | Action, puzzle | General Consumer Electronics | Milton Bradley | |
| 1985 | Roller Coaster | Amstrad CPC, Commodore 64, ZX Spectrum | Action, platform, puzzle | S. Brocklehurst | Elite Systems | |
| 1989 | Roller Coaster Rumbler | Amiga, Atari ST, Commodore 64, MS-DOS | Rail shooter | Subway Software | Tynesoft | |
| 2009 | 3D Rollercoaster Rush | iOS, Android | Strategy | Digital Chocolate | RockYou | 3D Rollercoaster Rush has seven sequels, most notably Haunted 3D Rollercoaster Rush and Jurassic 3D Rollercoaster Rush. |
| 2015 | Screamride | Xbox One, Xbox 360 | Puzzle | Frontier Developments | Microsoft Studios | |

== See also ==
- List of city-building video games
- List of business simulation video games
- List of simulation video games
