= Planet Zoo =

2019 video game

- Developer: Frontier Developments
- Publisher: Frontier Developments
- Director: Piers Jackson
- Producer: Steve Wilkins
- Designer: James Taylor
- Artist: Marc Cox
- Composers: J. J. Ipsen; Jim Guthrie
- Series: Planet
- Platforms: Windows; PlayStation 5; Xbox Series X/S
- Release: Windows; 5 November 2019; PS5, Series X/S; 26 March 2024
- Genre: Construction and management simulation
- Mode: Single-player

Planet Zoo is a 2019 construction and management simulation game by Frontier Developments. The game is a spiritual successor to Zoo Tycoon and Zoo Tycoon 2, with gameplay similar to the studio's theme park game, Planet Coaster. Originally released for Windows, ports for PlayStation 5 and Xbox Series X/S were released in 2024.

As with Planet Coaster, critics praised Planet Zoo's creation tools along with its realistic animal portrayals and emphasis on wildlife conservation. However, the game was also criticised for the complexity of its management and building mechanics, which were deemed to be overly challenging for some players. Planet Zoo has received several downloadable content packs adding more animals. The game sold over a million copies in six months. On 28 May 2026, a sequel titled Planet Zoo 2 was announced which released on 13 October 2026.

== Gameplay ==
A Mandrill exhibit in Planet Zoo

Planet Zoo tasks players with building a zoo, with 76 animal species in the base game and 134 new species available through 20 separate downloadable content packs, the Deluxe Edition and Anniversary updates. Animals, controlled by artificial intelligence, behave similarly to their real-life counterparts. For instance, wolves adopt a pack mentality and animals of the African plains (such as giraffes, zebras, wildebeest, and buffalo) can live together in a single mixed-species habitat. Each species has its own requirements and needs that players must satisfy through creation of a suitable exhibit environment and adequate behavioral enrichment. Predators can attack and kill other animals, but unlike in Zoo Tycoon, cannot attack guests. Each animal has their own genome within the game's breeding system, which reflect its life expectancy, size, health, and fertility and can be passed down through offspring. As such, elements such as inbreeding may have negative consequences on progeny.

In addition to ensuring animal welfare, the player must deal with managing the park as an institution. This includes hiring staff, constructing guest amenities and staff facilities, performing research, and working towards the conservation of threatened and endangered species. Like Planet Coaster, Planet Zoo provides over a thousand building pieces such as seats, lighting, bushes, trees, and items such as individual planks of wood, glass, rocks, and roof tiles. By allowing these items to phase-into and/or lock with each other, the creative player can create elaborate buildings, landscaping, and natural structures such as waterfalls and cave systems from scratch. Custom structures can be uploaded as "blueprints" for other players to download for free and place in their own zoos via the Steam Workshop. Safari, boat, train, monorail, and gondola lift rides can also be constructed throughout the zoo for transportation and to offer guests additional ways of viewing animals. The game features a dynamic day/night cycle, weather patterns, and animal feces physics.

The game features four modes: sandbox, career, challenge, and the online franchise mode. In career mode, the player character works at a zoo company until his boss goes missing and the company is bought out by Dominic Myers. Myers fires the player character, who begins working for his boss's daughter establishing zoos and exposing Myers' criminal behavior. The franchise mode allows the player to build multiple franchise zoos with a shared economy and animals. Animals can be purchased and traded with other players' zoos through an online marketplace. Regular cooperative online community challenges focused on conservation (such as breeding and releasing as many giant pandas to the wild within a certain timeframe) allow players to receive "conservation credits," which can be redeemed for new animals instead of regular in-game currency. The base game features eleven critically endangered animal species and subspecies. Through paid DLC, the game added 8 more critically endangered species. Increasing the zoo's conservation rating through the display and release of endangered animals, informational signs, and educational talks is an important gameplay goal.

== Development and release ==
The game was announced on 24 April 2019 and released on 5 November 2019. Its release was highly anticipated by many fans of the original Zoo Tycoon series who were disappointed by the significant changes to the 2013 reboot. Planet Zoo was made using Frontier's Cobra game engine.

Frontier has continued to support the game through free updates to the base game. In addition to patching and bug fixes, these free updates have included new content such as scenery items including foliage and building pieces, new menus for food quality and park rides, and new in-game mechanics like hereditable colour variation, vending machines, educator animal talks, first person camera mode and animal underwater diving. Frontier commemorates the game's yearly anniversary through "Anniversary Updates", commonly adding more animals to the game. So far, the anniversary animals added have been the black-and-white ruffed lemur, red deer, collared peccary, African leopard, and Malabar rose. A version for the PlayStation 5 and Xbox Series X/S, Planet Zoo: Console Edition, was released on 26 March 2024. Several downloadable content packs have been released for the game, adding new animals, items, and scenarios.

=== Downloadable content ===
Planet Zoo has 21 total downloadable content packs.

List of downloadable content for Planet Zoo
Pack	Released	Ref.
Deluxe Upgrade Pack	5 November 2019	
Arctic Pack	17 December 2019	
South America Pack	7 April 2020	
Australia Pack	25 August 2020	
Aquatic Pack	8 December 2020	
Southeast Asia Animal Pack	30 March 2021	
Africa Pack	22 June 2021	
North America Animal Pack	4 October 2021	
Europe Pack	14 December 2021	
Wetlands Animal Pack	12 April 2022	
Conservation Pack	21 June 2022	
Twilight Pack	18 October 2022	
Grasslands Animal Pack	13 December 2022	
Tropical Pack	4 April 2023	
Arid Animal Pack	20 June 2023	
Oceania Pack	19 September 2023	
Eurasia Animal Pack	13 December 2023	
Barnyard Animal Pack	30 April 2024	
Zookeepers Animal Pack	15 October 2024	
Americas Animal Pack	15 April 2025	
Asia Animal Pack	25 June 2025	

== Reception ==
Reception

Aggregate scores
Aggregator	Score
Metacritic	81/100
OpenCritic	81% recommend (Note: Based on 67 reviews.)

Review scores
Publication	Score
Destructoid	8.5/10
Game Informer	7/10
GameSpot	7/10
IGN	8.5/10
PC Gamer (US)	75/100

Planet Zoo received "generally positive reviews" according to review aggregator website Metacritic. It was praised for its attention to detail, graphics, heavily-researched animal behavior, robust build tools, in-depth management and economy system, and educational value regarding wildlife conservation. Drawing from Planet Coaster, the game was construed as offering players unparalleled flexibility and scope to design a zoological park unbound by creativity relative to previous zoo-based simulation games. IGN described the game as "widely satisfying" and "wowed with a huge amount of customization." Destructoid praised it as successfully capturing the spirit of Zoo Tycoon and many reviews have characterized it as the finest zoo management game of its time, with Kotaku calling it "one of gaming's great sandboxes".

However, these features also drew criticism for a steep learning curve and requiring a heavy attention to management; many reviewers considered this potentially off-putting to casual players who may be primarily interested in the animals over broader elements of park management. Although highly complex and detailed structures may be designed from scratch, the building mechanics and pathing system in particular have been described as being very difficult for new players to execute properly, especially for those who had not previously played Planet Coaster. Various guest, staff, and animal welfare mechanics have also been described as requiring an at times overwhelming degree of micromanagement. GameSpot described the game as a "spreadsheet safari" which "sometimes stumbles under the weight of its own systems", while GameInformer concluded that "an unreasonable level of patience [...] creates a barrier around its best qualities."

Reception to post-launch support and updates have been positive, with several attempts to address ongoing criticisms of the management and building systems. The introduction of new animals and set pieces has been highly positive, although some players have advocated for increasing the number of additional animals per DLC pack. Planet Zoo has adopted an approach of releasing smaller, more frequent content packs in contrast to the larger expansion packs of the original Zoo Tycoon series. In response to this feedback, the fifth expansion pack, the Southeast Asia Animal Pack, was released with 8 animals; the developers also made rapid modifications to the incoming binturong model after fans identified inaccurate anatomy in pre-release screenshots.

The game had sold more than a million copies by May 2020. It won the awards for "Best Simulation Game" at Gamescom 2019 and "Best Strategy/Simulation Game" at the 2020 Webby Awards. It was also nominated for "Best British Game" at the 16th British Academy Games Awards.
