= Theme Park Studio =

2016 video game

- Logo of Theme Park Studio
- Developer: Pantera Entertainment
- Publisher: Pantera Entertainment
- Designer: Steve Fielding
- Platform: Microsoft Windows
- Release: 25 November 2016 (Retail); 2 December 2016 (Steam)
- Mode: Single-player

Theme Park Studio is an amusement park simulator game developed by Pantera Entertainment. The project began seeking funding on Kickstarter in 2013 and has been released in phases since February 2014. It allows users to design and build their own theme parks featuring roller coasters and flat rides; similar to RollerCoaster Tycoon 3. The game utilizes Oculus Rift, HTC Vive, and OSVR to allow users to experience roller coasters in a virtual reality format.

== Gameplay ==
Theme Park Studio allows users to design and build their own custom theme parks with the use of an extensive toolset. Users are able to place pathways, scenery, foliage and a combination of flat rides and roller coasters to produce a virtual theme park of their imagination.

The game also features other modules such as terrain editing and the ability to easily manipulate the environment through weather and lighting. Users will have the ability to script their own mini games and work with a wide variety of particle effects.

== Development ==
Theme Park Studio was announced on 20 November 2012. In April 2013, Pantera began a Kickstarter campaign that successfully raised 101,433 US dollars by its end date in May. On 27 February 2014, Pantera released Phase 1 of the Early Access campaign on Steam Since then, the game has gradually been rolled out in further stages including the ability to design and animate flat rides, as well as being able to design and test roller coasters.

The game is being released in phases via Steam. The first three phases released include access to building paths, foliage, structures, flat rides, and a present library of roller coasters.

On 25 November 2016, the game was released via retail. Later, on 2 December 2016, the game was brought out of Steam Early Access.

== See also ==
- NoLimits 2
- RollerCoaster Tycoon 3
- Planet Coaster
