= Planet Zoo: South America Pack =

DLC for Planet Zoo

- Developer: Frontier Developments
- Publisher: Frontier Developments
- Series: Planet
- Platforms: Windows; PlayStation 5; Xbox Series X/S
- Release: 7 April 2020 (PC); 29 January 2025 (Console)
- Genre: Construction and management simulation
- Mode: Single-player

Planet Zoo: South America Pack is the second major downloadable content (DLC) expansion pack for the construction and management simulation video game Planet Zoo developed and released by Frontier Developments. It was released on 7 April 2020 and is themed around the wildlife of South America.

== Gameplay ==
The DLC contains five new animals - the jaguar, llama, giant anteater, colombian white-faced capuchin, and red-eyed tree frog - as well as over 250 new scenery pieces, including jungle foliage and building pieces based after Mesoamerican architecture.

== Release ==
The expansion pack was released on 7 April 2020, alongside update 1.2 of the game. It was later made available for the Console Edition on 29 January 2025, alongside the Australia Pack.

== Reception ==
Screen Rant called the pack "good but not esstential," feeling that it did not has as much content as the prior Arctic Pack, but nonetheless praised the content it did have. Multiplayer.it rated the DLC 8/10, feeling that it would "certainly appeal to those who play Planet Zoo regularly and are looking for something new to use in building their virtual zoos," but wasn't perfect. Similarly, French website Gameblog rated the pack 6/10, calling it "less interesting in terms of content," feeling that the content was limited despite the diverse continent it was themed after. The Gamer noted it was "similar in content to the Arctic Pack but with more focus on the decorative side." Gaming website But Why Tho? noted that "the content was a little light" but still gave it a mostly positive review, rating it 9/10.

Game Rant placed it seventh in their ranking of Planet Zoo DLCs, noting that many downloadable creations from the regular game are made using the pack.
