= Zombie Lane =

2011 video game

- Developer: Digital Chocolate
- Publisher: RockYou
- Platforms: Facebook, Google Plus, Android, iOS
- Release: April 2011
- Genres: Simulation, RPG

Zombie Lane is a social network game developed by Digital Chocolate's Helsinki-based studio and released on Facebook and Google+ in 2011. In late 2011, it was released on the iOS App Store. Players must rebuild their shattered neighbourhoods after their destruction by a zombie apocalypse. The game was praised by reviewers for its graphics and gameplay. By July 2014, the Facebook version had over 2.2 million likes, and as of April 2014 it has been licensed to RockYou while the developers from Digital Chocolate were hired to continue to work on the game.

== Gameplay ==
Gameplay centers on farming and rebuilding the destroyed neighborhood, with the game beginning at the end of the world. The player's character has lost their spouse and dog, who need to be located, and the dilapidated shack which used to be their home is the only building left standing. The player is given advice by a character called Rob the Rent-a-Cop, and must deal with the encroaching zombies as well as restore the neighborhood. The player begins with a shovel as their only weapon, but in time can create makeshift weapons from collected objects and obtain firearms.

Rubble and debris litters the game area, and must be cleared before the player can plant crops, which in turn can be converted into food which restores energy. Combat involves clicking on zombies in order to attack them. Should the player be attacked by a zombie their character will be momentarily stunned, no other penalties are incurred. Enemies become more difficult to defeat as the game progresses. When enemies are defeated they disappear, despite the game's setting combat is slapstick in nature rather than overtly violent. Zombies drop items when defeated, with different types of zombies dropping different items. The door-to-door salesman zombies drop sporting goods, whereas zombies that were formerly shop employees drop household goods.

The game's plot is minimal, instead tasks are given in order to achieve overarching goals such as locating the player's spouse. These tasks can involve defeating a set number of opponents within a time limit, or producing crops, and will either be single challenges or connected to the larger goals.

As the player progresses, they access additional play areas some of which have a more linear plot progression.

== Reception ==
Zombie Lane was praised by reviewers in terms of its graphics and gameplay. Gamezebo's Andrew Webster stated "Zombie Lane sports smooth and charming 3D visuals, with distinct characters and solid animation. The soundtrack, too, has a very fitting horror crossed with comedy vibe." He compared the game to FrontierVille, stating "The core game may not be all that original, but Zombie Lane still feels like a fresh experience." Seattle Post-Intelligencer writer Josh Sprague Stated "..it's actually a lot of fun to pump lead into some zombies while you're waiting for your strawberries to ripen. The visuals are fresh and carry a joe six-pack charm..".
