= Jia Shen =

American technology entrepreneur

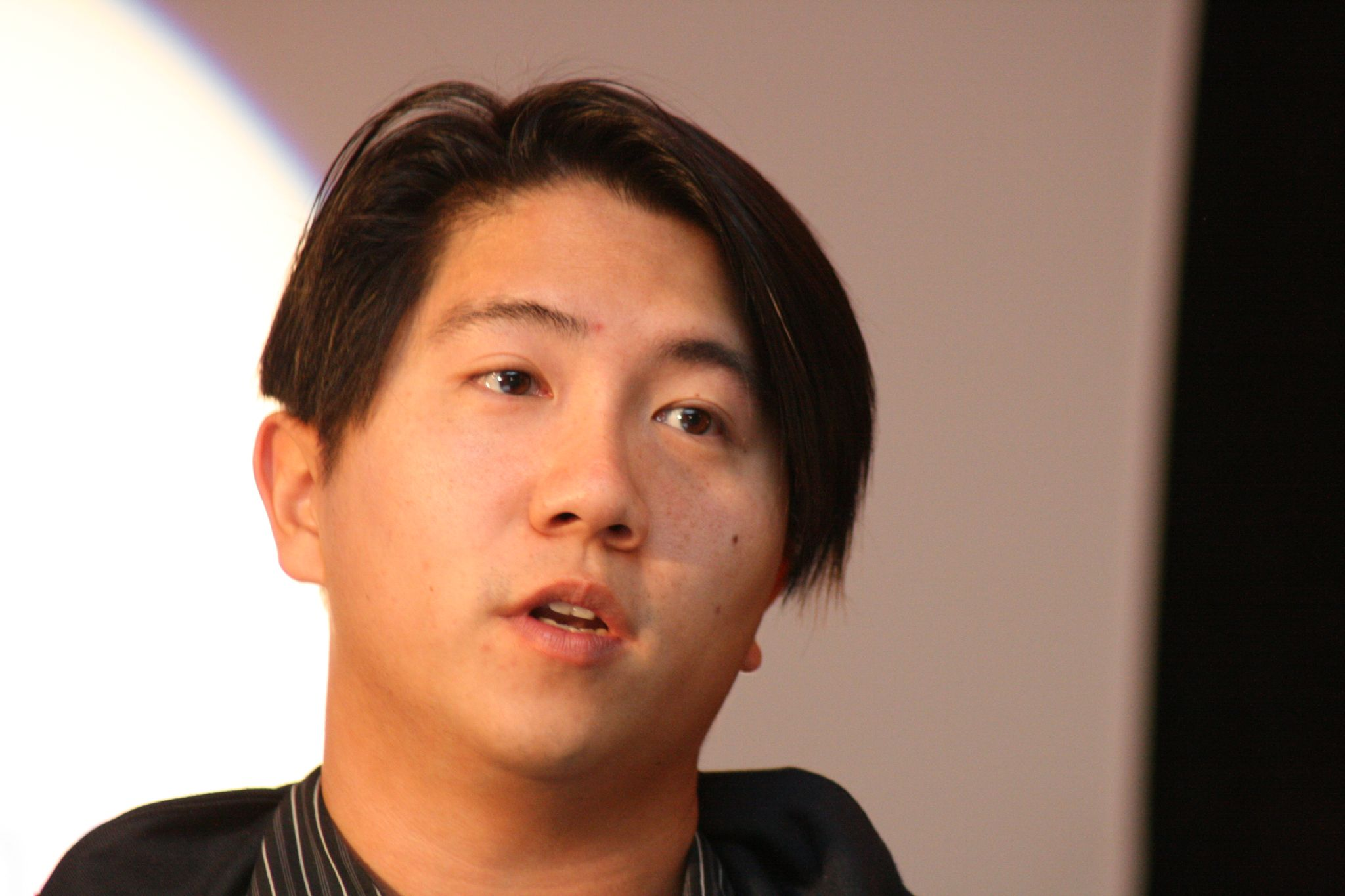
Jia Shen, 2007

Jia Shen is an American technology entrepreneur best known as the co-founder of RockYou, a company that developed games and widgets for social networks, such as Myspace and Facebook. At RockYou, Jia led the company to acquire over 400 million users and raise over $140 million in investment.

In 2014, Shen founded the company PowerCore, which creates smart toys and branded merchandise for brands, such as Battle Tails, Mino Monsters, and Business Fish.

Most recently Shen leads the Asian efforts of Game Closure, the creator of EverWing on the Instant Games platform in Facebook Messenger and a launch partner on the LINE Quick Games platform.

Shen is currently managing and operating GC Turbo (gaming), AKA Virtual (mocap and animation production), and SHISA.AI (AI machine-learning).

== Public appearances ==
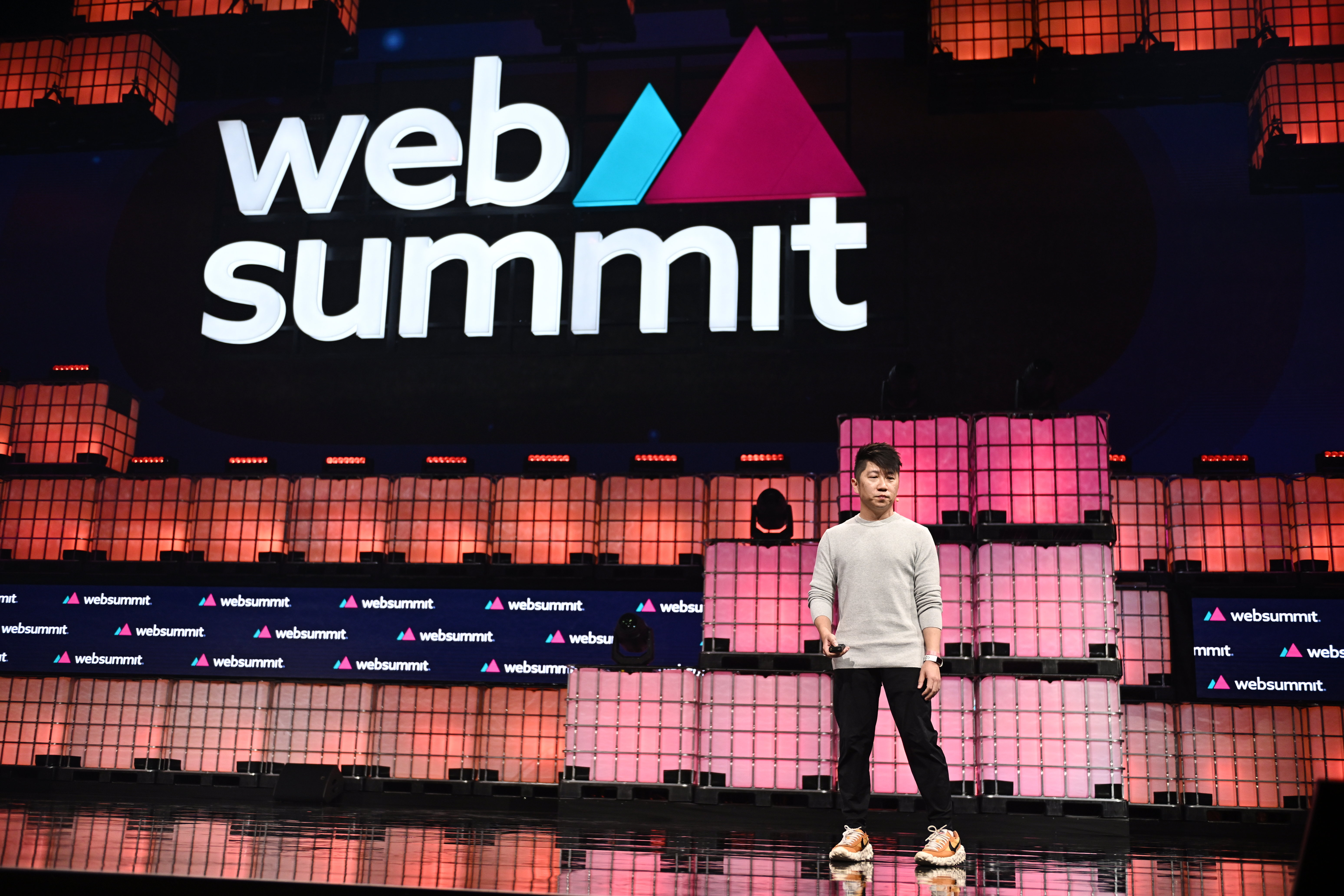
AKA Virtual CEO & Co-Founder, Jia Shen, delivers a speech at Web Summit 2023.

Shen was invited to deliver the keynote speech "Virtual Characters and Real-Time Content Creation" at Google EMEA's Think Global APAC Summit 2023 held in Tokyo, Japan on May 10, 2023. Shen also appeared on the stage of Web Summit 2023 in Lisbon, Portugal, delivering a speech alongside SEGA on virtual content production.

In 2024, Shen will appear at East Meets West 2024 in Honolulu, Hawai`i.
