= 3D Brick Breaker Revolution =

2009 video game

- App Store icon
- Developer: Digital Chocolate
- Publisher: Digital Chocolate
- Series: Brick Breaker
- Platforms: iOS, Windows Phone 7
- Release: March 16, 2009
- Genre: Breakout
- Mode: Single-player

3D Brick Breaker Revolution is a 2009 video game developed and published by Digital Chocolate. Upon release, the game received mixed reviews.

== Gameplay ==
A boss battle in revolution mode.

Brick Breaker Revolution 3D is an Arkanoid style game where players destroy bricks and boss battles using weapons and a ball. There are three game modes: classic mode, revolution mode, and time attack. The game features power-ups that are collected as they drop down the screen during levels. The game features a difficulty level, this level increases after every boss battle depending on the player's skill.

== Release ==
The game was released on March 16, 2009.

== Reception ==
Reception

Review scores
Publication	Score
IGN	7.4/10
Pocket Gamer	3/5

3D Brick Breaker Revolution received mixed reviews. Praising the game as, IGN found its visual design stylish and its Revolution mode added a "new angle" to gameplay, but felt that tilt controls could have made the game's controls and use of power-ups simpler. Windows Central wrote that the game was fun, but better titles in the genre existed and the gameplay and visual additions were awkwardly implemented. Pocket Gamer critiqued the game's attempt to innnovate on the Breakout formula as "needless and distracting", considering its 3D perspective impaired the player's view of the ball.
