= Tower Bloxx =

2005 puzzle video game

- Developer: Digital Chocolate Helsinki
- Publisher: Digital Chocolate
- Designer: Mikko Kodisoja
- Platforms: J2ME, BREW, Adobe Flash (web browser), DoJa, Windows Mobile, BlackBerry, Android
- Release: 2005
- Genres: Puzzle, casual
- Mode: Single-player

Tower Bloxx is a 2005 puzzle video game developed by Digital Chocolate Helsinki and published by American company Digital Chocolate first for mobile phones and later on other platforms. The game is based around stacking floors of skyscrapers by timing their release from a swinging crane. It is also known by the alternate title City Bloxx.

== Gameplay ==
Tower Bloxx is built around a one-button tower-building mechanic. Each floor is carried by a crane and swings from side to side before the player drops it onto the tower below. Better alignment allows the tower to grow higher and remain more stable, while poorly placed floors make the tower sway more and become harder to build.

The game has two main modes: a quick game mode and a city-building mode. In quick game mode, the player builds the tallest tower possible, and the game ends after three missed drops. In city-building mode, completed towers are placed into a city grid. The mode combines the tower-building action with a spatial puzzle in which different tower types have placement requirements.

In city-building mode, the player starts with basic residential towers and unlocks larger building types as the city grows. Higher-value buildings have stricter placement rules; for example, some tower types must be placed next to lower-level buildings. The goal is to increase the city's population by building taller and better-aligned towers.

== Development and release ==
The game was developed by Digital Chocolate's Helsinki studio and its executive producer being Trip Hawkins. The studio had been founded as Sumea in 2000 and was acquired by Digital Chocolate in 2004, after which it became Digital Chocolate Helsinki. In a postmortem published by Game Developer, Mikko Kodisoja described Tower Bloxx as an iterative mobile game project built around short play sessions and a simple one-button mechanic.

Tower Bloxx was released to mobile phone carriers in December 2005. It came out on many other platforms later as well, including one as an application on Facebook in 2007. Some mobile phone manufacturers such as LG also preloaded the game on some of their products.

== Reception ==
Tower Bloxx received positive reviews from mobile game critics. GameSpot gave the game a score of 7.2 out of 10, writing that its city-building mode added lasting value to the otherwise simple tower-building mechanic. Pocket Gamer praised the game as accessible and replayable, describing it as a mobile game that took only seconds to understand but could take weeks or months to master.

Game Developer described the game's concept as "Tetris meets Sim City" and noted its focus on combining timing-based action with city-building progression. The game won the 2005 Mobile Award for Best Puzzle Game. It won the Mobile Game Award at MEM 06 (Mobile Entertainment Market conference).

An IGN editor described the game as one that: "smartly combines puzzle gaming with a clever strategy element." The site rated it 9 out of 10 along with an Editor's Choice award.

== Sequels ==
Tower Bloxx became the first entry in a series of related games. Tower Bloxx Deluxe was the second game, released in 2008. It also came out on PC including as a physical CD-ROM and as a Xbox 360 Xbox Live Arcade game in October 2009. Under the title City Bloxx it was also preloaded on some Nokia phones. Later new games in the series and follow-ups included Tower Bloxx: New York and Tower Bloxx 6-D.
