= Crazy Penguin Catapult =

2007 mobile video game

- Developers: Sumea (J2ME, Windows); Digital Chocolate (iOS)
- Publisher: Digital Chocolate
- Series: Crazy Penguin
- Platforms: J2ME; Microsoft Windows iOS, BlackBerry
- Release: 2007 (J2ME, Windows); December 12, 2008 (iOS)
- Genres: Action, Artillery, Strategy
- Mode: Single-player

Crazy Penguin Catapult is an action-adventure mobile game developed by Sumea and published by Digital Chocolate for Java ME mobile devices in 2007, and later ported to Microsoft Windows and iOS. The game revolves around courageous penguins fending off their territories from invading polar bears using a catapult. It is reminiscent of Yetisports.

A direct sequel titled Crazy Penguin Catapult 2 was released on June 20, 2009, also on J2ME and iOS. Four smaller spin-offs followed, including a Facebook game Crazy Penguin Wars.

== Gameplay ==
=== Crazy Penguin Catapult / Crazy Penguin Catapult 2 ===
Each level has two stages: the first sees the player try to use a catapult to fling penguins through a gap in the wall. Those that make it through are then brought into stage two, which has the player drop the penguins into an area filled with polar bears, the aim being to knock each of them out using the diving penguins. Polar bears are usually found hiding behind ice block structures, which penguins may have to break through with their bouncy bodies. Each penguin has a limited number of bounces.

The intro cutscene, much like the later Angry Birds', shows polar bears who have kidnapped and caged several penguins. Given player's performance, the number of beaten bears attain up to 3 stars in each mission, which can eventually unlock permanent upgrades, like fire rings which put penguins on flames to melt through ice, rubber penguins upgrade which gives two more bounces, or twins, triplets and quadruplets, which add up to the total number of catapultable penguins. At the end of each of three sections of the world is a boss fight against a bear with more health points than a usual one.

=== Crazy Penguin Party ===
A collection of party minigames released in 2009. It consists of six minigames, played against a computer or up to four other players with fast completion in mind:

- Free Fall - a skydive race through boost rings into a pool
- Rocket Science - a jet pack race across dangerous water gaps while having to take breaks to recharge it
- Cliff Hanger - a Doodle Jump-esque platformer where the penguin bounces off napping polar bears and springs
- Diving - an underwater diving race while escaping a giant octopus
- Crazy Spin - an ice skating race with a spinning penguin involving timed inputs
- Blowfish Rodeo - a blowfish-riding race where timed puffing up of the fish accelerates the duo

The tournament mode is played on a tile-claiming board, where each player has to play a random mini-game to claim a tile. Collecting 75 stars along the path gains the player a bonus turn. Players can beat each other's records to overwrite a tile as their own, and the first to claim four differently-colored tiles wins the game.

=== Crazy Penguin Assault ===
Penguins in this 2011 game infiltrate the Arctic territories threatened by polar and panda bears. The campaign mode is much like Angry Birds where a flock of penguins with different characteristics get to knock out all bears in each level, launched from a spruce tree by a rope. There is also a "frenzy" mode where the player instead strategically plants dynamite into structures to make them collapse into bears.

=== Crazy Penguin Freezeway ===
A 2011 Frogger-style game where the penguin has to cross a river and enter an igloo, while avoiding a polar bear which throws snowballs and sometimes blocks the way. The penguin can pick up fishes from some floating platforms, throw them at the bear, and sneak into the igloo while the bear is busy eating.

=== Crazy Penguin Wars ===
The last entry to the series, introduced to Facebook and iOS in 2012, was an online multiplayer game heavily inspired by the Worms series. Penguins could use a variety of weapons to deal direct damage, collapse structures, sink other players into water, off the cliffs, and cause fall damage. New weapons required their recipes be researched with various combinable ingredients in order to be crafted.

== Reception ==
Reception

Review scores
Publication	Score
IGN	8/10 stars
Pocket Gamer	3.5/5 stars
AppSafari	3.5/5 stars
Airgamer	8.8/10 stars

Crazy Penguin Catapult was received with generally positive reviews. An IGN review compliments the music and effects as "very well done" but notes that "music does loop quite a bit and may feel too repetitive to some players." Pocket Gamer considers the catapulting part "a bit weak", but the addition of the strategy mode to have bulked the game out as "attractive and pleasantly playable package". TheAPPera calls it "a quirky and addictive game involving throwing penguins off catapults and targeting angry polar bears. Top off with the cute soundtrack and effects, and you get one insanely fun game!" Airgamer stated that "All animations are lovingly designed and look very funny."

Crazy Penguin Catapult 2 saw similar success but was criticized for lack of innovation. Gamezebo rated the iOS version of Crazy Penguin Wars 4 stars out of 5.
