= Planet Zoo 2 =

2026 video game

- Developer: Frontier Developments
- Publisher: Frontier Developments
- Composer: JJ Ipsen (Note: Others composers who worked in the soundtrack are Erasmus Talbot, Dan Millidge, Marcus Hedges, Alastair McNamara and Joanna Pena.)
- Series: Planet
- Platforms: PlayStation 5; Windows; Xbox Series X/S
- Release: 13 October 2026
- Genre: Construction and management simulation
- Mode: Single-player

Planet Zoo 2 is a construction and management simulation video game developed and published by Frontier Developments. It is the sequel to Planet Zoo. The game was released for PlayStation 5, Windows and Xbox Series X/S on 13 October 2026.

== Gameplay ==
Planet Zoo 2 introduces fully aquatic and flying species, and allows players to build and manage both commercial zoos and wildlife reserves.

== Development and release ==
The game was announced in a video for the sixth anniversary of the original game's release on 5 November 2025. It was lead composed by JJ Ipsen. The game was officially released on PlayStation 5, Windows and Xbox Series X/S on 13 October 2026.

== Reception ==
Reception

Aggregate scores
Aggregator	Score
Metacritic	PC: 84/100; PS5: 81/100; XSX: 79/100
OpenCritic	87% recommend (Note: Based on 15 reviews.)

Review scores
Publication	Score
Destructoid	9.5/10
GameStar	84/100
IGN	9/10
Jeuxvideo.com	18/20
PC Gamer (US)	60/100
Push Square	9/10

Planet Zoo 2 received "generally favorable" reviews, according to review aggregator platform Metacritic. Fellow review aggregator OpenCritic assessed that the game received strong approval, being recommended by 87% of critics.

The game was nominated for "Best Sim/Strategy Game" at The Game Awards 2026.
