= Tornado Mania! =

2006 video game

Tornado Mania
- Developer: Digital Chocolate
- Platforms: Mobile Phone, Microsoft Windows
- Release: Mobile Phone: WW: February 28, 2006; Microsoft Windows: WW: February 28, 2009
- Mode: Single-player

Tornado Mania! is a mobile game developed by Digital Chocolate. Players assume the role of a scientist who has decided to create his own Utopia by collecting buildings with the tornadoes he creates.

== Gameplay ==
Players assume the role of a scientist who has grown weary of the world and therefore decides to create his own isolated Utopia. The game's 'Utopia Mode' combines elements of Katamari Damacy and Sim City; after buildings have been claimed by the player's tornado they are placed in the target location, optimal placement increases the Utopia's inhabitants' happiness. Players do not have direct control over the tornado's path; it sweeps across the landscape in a clockwise arc, players can alter the direction of movement by reversing to counter-clockwise movement.

== Reception ==
Tornado Mania! received a positive response from game critics, including being awarded a perfect 10/10 and IGN's game of the month award for December 2006.
