= Trip Hawkins =

American businessman (born 1953)

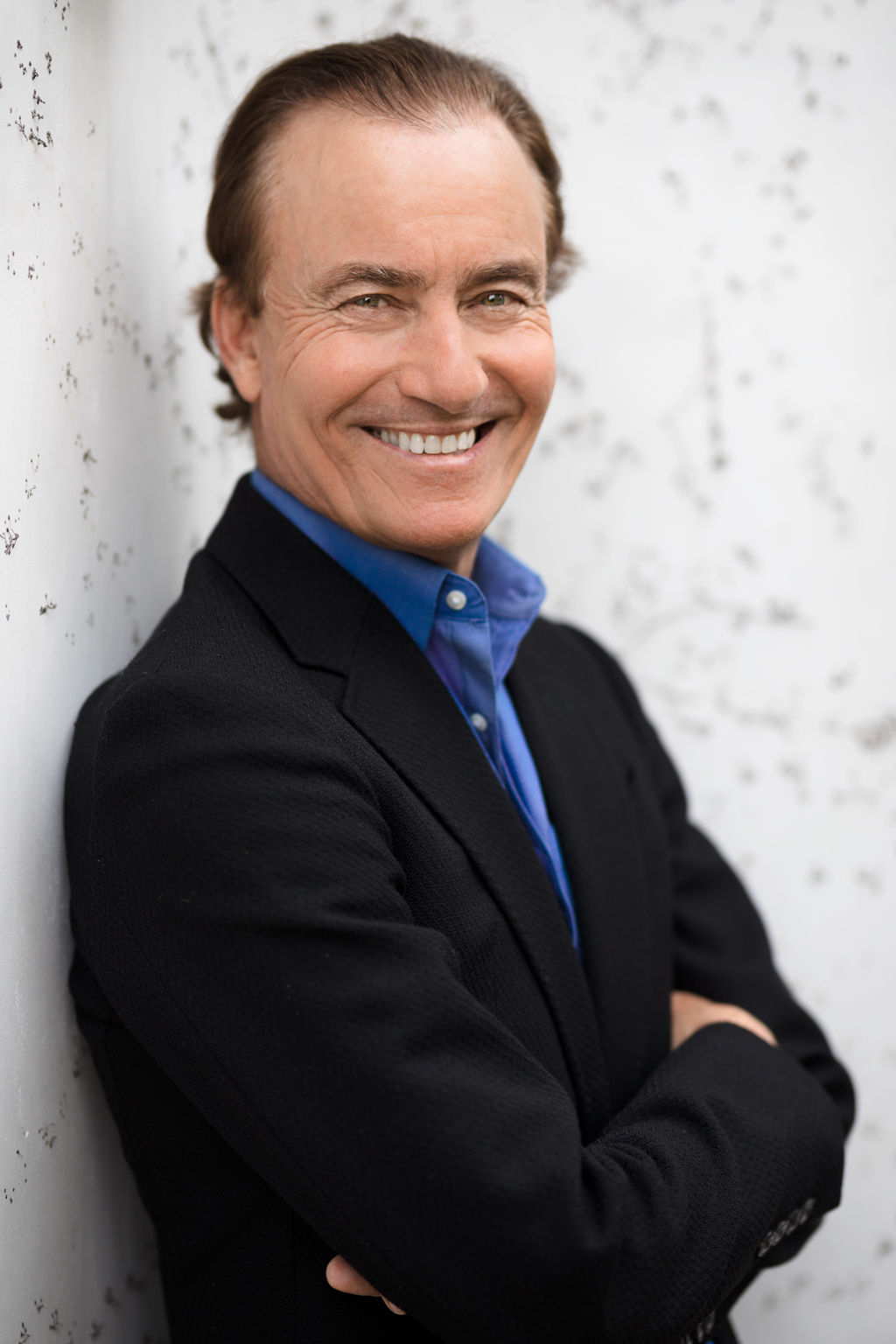
- Hawkins outside his Santa Barbara office in 2019
- Born: William Murray Hawkins III; December 28, 1953 (age 72); Pasadena, California, U.S.
- Education: Harvard University (BA); Stanford University (MBA)
- Occupation: Entrepreneur
- Known for: Founding Electronic Arts; Founding 3DO
- Board member of: Global Worldwide; DMarket; Break Away Data; Big Wolf Games; Sandsoft Games
- Spouse: Lisa Proctor Hawkins
- Children: 4
- Awards: AIAS Hall of Fame Award (2005)
- Website: triphawkins.com

William Murray "Trip" Hawkins III (born December 28, 1953) is an American entrepreneur and founder of Electronic Arts, The 3DO Company, and Digital Chocolate.

== Early life ==
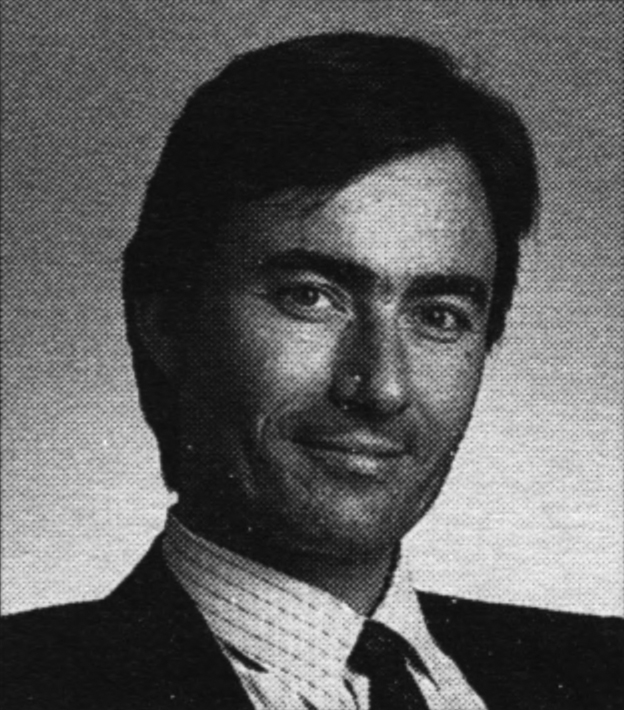
Hawkins in 1987

A fan of the Strat-O-Matic Football pen and paper games, Hawkins started his first business as a teenager trying to create a knockoff version. He borrowed $5,000 from his father to start up the venture and advertised his game in NFL Game Programs, but the business failed. Eventually, he received his first computer and became interested in creating a digital football game, because it would allow players to avoid the challenging math of the game, which was all handled internally.

He designed his own undergraduate major at Harvard University in Strategy and Applied Game Theory.

Around this time, in 1975, Hawkins estimated that it would take home computer saturation seven years to make a viable career out of game design.

In April 1977, Hawkins attended the first West Coast Computer Faire, where he saw the debut of the Apple II. The experience influenced his decision to join Apple Computer in 1978.

== Electronic Arts ==
He was the director of strategy and marketing at Apple Computer in 1982 when he left to found Electronic Arts (EA), a video game publisher. EA was successful for many years under his leadership. He has been credited with spearheading the games industry's evolution from simple one-person creations to complex team projects during this time. One of his first big wins was to sign John Madden on as a spokesperson and a consultant to his company's football game which would eventually lead to the popular Madden NFL series of video games.

At this point, Electronic Arts was a computer software company which did not want to deal with Nintendo's strict licensing policies. He saw his opportunity when Sega released the Genesis. Not wanting to pay licensing fees, he hired a team to reverse engineer the system for his company to make unlicensed games on it. Hawkins eventually revealed his intentions to Sega, while offering a partnership to combat Nintendo telling them, "You can sue, but we did the tech fair and square and have great lawyers. So make us an official licensee. And give us a reduced rate." Sega, anticipating that Hawkins would sell his research to other third-party companies, agreed and made them a partner.

== 3DO ==
Though he remained chair of the board until resigning in 1994, he transitioned from EA in 1991 to form 3DO, a video game console company. 3DO was formed in partnership with several other companies including EA. With its custom graphics hardware, the 3DO console was the most powerful video game console at the time of its introduction in 1993. It launched at an expensive US$599 (equivalent to about $1,400 in 2025), compared to other major systems under $200. Sales were poor due to its price and weak games that relied excessively on full-motion video sequences at the expense of gameplay. Hopes for the system were further damaged in 1994 with the arrival of the PlayStation and Saturn, both of which were less expensive than the 3DO but had more modern hardware and stronger first party support. While acknowledging the 3DO's failure in the marketplace, Next Generation listed Hawkins in their "75 Most Important People in the Games Industry of 1995", calling him "one of the game market's visionaries".

In 1996, 3DO stopped developing the system and transitioned into a video game developer, making games for the PlayStation, PC, and other consoles. While remaining chairman and CEO of the company, Hawkins took on the additional role of creative director. Hawkins focused on branding and 6-to-9-month production timetables for games. As a result, quality and sales suffered. Hawkins had used cash reserves to bail out the failing company before, but declined to do so a final time. Due to poor sales of its titles, it went bankrupt in May 2003. The defunct company sold most of its intellectual property, including the Might and Magic franchise, to publisher Ubisoft, while Trip Hawkins retained ownership of the 3DO console hardware and software.

== Later career ==
In late 2003, Hawkins launched a new video game development company called Digital Chocolate. The company focused on developing games for handheld devices. They received high success with the mobile puzzle game Tower Bloxx. He stepped down from the CEO position at Digital Chocolate in May 2012.

In 2012, Hawkins joined the board of directors of Israeli technology company Extreme Reality, which is working on developing motion control software that can read a person's movement in 3D, but which only requires a 2D camera.

On March 20, 2013, Nativex, a mobile ad technology platform for games, announced Trip Hawkins as a senior advisor to their board of directors. Hawkins also joined the advisory board at Skillz, a mobile eSports platform, as a strategic advisor in December 2014.

His newest startup, If You Can Company, aims to foster social and emotional development in children, teaching compassion and anti-bullying lessons. Their first game, "IF...", uses a free-to-play model and is meant for teachers and students in an educational environment.

Hawkins lives in Santa Barbara, California, where he served from 2016 to 2019 as a professor of entrepreneurship and leadership at the University of California, Santa Barbara.

== Honors ==
In 2005, Hawkins became the eighth person to be inducted into the Academy of Interactive Arts & Sciences Hall of Fame.

== In popular culture ==
Hawkins is portrayed by John Mulaney in director David O. Russell's 2026 John Madden biopic Madden.
