= Planet (series) =

Video game franchise by Frontier Developments

- Logo of the latest entry Planet Zoo 2
- Genre: Construction and management simulation
- Developer: Frontier Developments
- Publisher: Frontier Developments
- Platforms: macOS; PlayStation 4; PlayStation 5; Windows; Xbox One; Xbox Series X/S
- First release: Planet Coaster; 17 November 2016
- Latest release: Planet Zoo 2; 13 October 2026

Planet is a construction and management simulation video game franchise by created by Frontier Developments. It consists of two IPs, Planet Coaster and Planet Zoo, with a third IP currently under development. A total of four titles have been released to date, with Planet Zoo 2 released in October 2026 as the latest entry.

== History ==
Release timeline
2016	Planet Coaster
2017
2018
2019	Planet Zoo
2020
2021
2022
2023
2024	Planet Coaster 2
2025
2026	Planet Zoo 2
2027
2028	TBA

The Planet IP is created by Frontier Developments, a British video game developer known for titles such as RollerCoaster Tycoon 3, Thrillville, Thrillville: Off the Rails and Zoo Tycoon. The inaugural entry, Planet Coaster, was released in November 2016, followed by Planet Zoo in November 2019.

Following 2020, Frontier Developments pursued a diversification strategy, releasing titles in other genres, including the sports management video game series, F1 Manager, and the real-time strategy game, Warhammer Age of Sigmar: Realms of Ruin. However, this approach proved unsuccessful, prompting the company to refocus on its core management simulation expertise. Consequently, Planet Coaster 2 was released in November 2024, and Planet Zoo 2 in October 2026.

In June 2026, it was announced that a third brand new Planet IP is currently in development, with a projected release date in 2028 as the fifth installment in the franchise.

== Games ==
Series	Title	Year	Platform(s)
Planet Coaster	Planet Coaster	2016	macOS, PlayStation 4, PlayStation 5, Windows, Xbox One, Xbox Series X/S
Planet Coaster	Planet Coaster 2	2024	PlayStation 5, Windows, Xbox Series X/S
Planet Zoo	Planet Zoo	2019	PlayStation 5, Windows, Xbox Series X/S
Planet Zoo	Planet Zoo 2	2026	PlayStation 5, Windows, Xbox Series X/S
TBA	TBA	2028	TBA

== Downloadable content ==
Since the release of Planet Coaster in 2016, Frontier Developments has expanded the Planet franchise through numerous downloadable content (DLC) packs:

- Planet Coaster features 12 DLC packs.
- Planet Zoo features 20 DLC packs.
- Planet Coaster 2 features 8 DLC packs.
- Planet Zoo 2 Features 2 DLC packs.

DLC release timeline
2017	Back to the Future Time Machine Construction Kit (plc); Knight Rider K.I.T.T. Construction Kit (plc); The Munsters Munster Koach Construction Kit (plc); Spooky Pack (plc); Adventure Pack (plc)
2018	Studios Pack (plc); Vintage Pack (plc); World's Fair Pack (plc); Magnificent Rides Collection (plc)
2019	Classic Rides Collection (plc); Ghostbusters (plc); Quick Draw Interactive Shooting Ride (plc); Deluxe Upgrade Pack (plz); Arctic Pack (plz)
2020	South America Pack (plz); Australia Pack (plz); Aquatic Pack (plz)
2021	Southeast Asia Animal Pack (plz); Africa Pack (plz); North America Animal Pack (plz); Europe Pack (plz)
2022	Wetlands Animal Pack (plz); Conservation Pack (plz); Twilight Pack (plz); Grasslands Animal Pack (plz)
2023	Tropical Pack (plz); Arid Animal Pack (plz); Oceania Pack (plz); Eurasia Animal Pack (plz)
2024	Barnyard Animal Pack (plz); Zookeepers Animal Pack (plz); Vintage Funfair Ride Pack (plc2); Thrill-Seekers Ride Pack (plc2); Bonus Ride Collection (plc2)
2025	Americas Animal Pack (plz); Asia Animal Pack (plz); Sorcery Pack (plc2); Toybox Pack (plc2)
2026	Parades Pack (plc2); Silver Screen Pack (plc2); Deluxe Upgrade Pack (plz2); Bonus Content Pack (plz2); Spooktacular Pack (plc2)

DLC / Expansion pack	Game	Release date
Back to the Future™ Time Machine Construction Kit	Planet Coaster	July 21, 2017
Knight Rider™ K.I.T.T. Construction Kit	Planet Coaster	July 21, 2017
The Munsters® Munster Koach Construction Kit	Planet Coaster	July 21, 2017
Spooky Pack	Planet Coaster	September 25, 2017
Adventure Pack	Planet Coaster	December 18, 2017
Studios Pack	Planet Coaster	March 27, 2018
Vintage Pack	Planet Coaster	July 10, 2018
World's Fair Pack	Planet Coaster	October 16, 2018
Magnificent Rides Collection	Planet Coaster	December 20, 2018
Classic Rides Collection	Planet Coaster	April 16, 2019
Ghostbusters™	Planet Coaster	June 4, 2019
Quick Draw Interactive Shooting Ride	Planet Coaster	June 4, 2019
Deluxe Upgrade Pack	Planet Zoo	November 5, 2019
Arctic Pack	Planet Zoo	December 17, 2019
South America Pack	Planet Zoo	April 7, 2020
Australia Pack	Planet Zoo	August 25, 2020
Aquatic Pack	Planet Zoo	December 8, 2020
Southeast Asia Animal Pack	Planet Zoo	March 30, 2021
Africa Pack	Planet Zoo	June 22, 2021
North America Animal Pack	Planet Zoo	October 4, 2021
Europe Pack	Planet Zoo	December 14, 2021
Wetlands Animal Pack	Planet Zoo	April 12, 2022
Conservation Pack	Planet Zoo	June 21, 2022
Twilight Pack	Planet Zoo	October 18, 2022
Grasslands Animal Pack	Planet Zoo	December 13, 2022
Tropical Pack	Planet Zoo	April 4, 2023
Arid Animal Pack	Planet Zoo	June 20, 2023
Oceania Pack	Planet Zoo	September 19, 2023
Eurasia Animal Pack	Planet Zoo	December 13, 2023
Barnyard Animal Pack	Planet Zoo	April 30, 2024
Zookeepers Animal Pack	Planet Zoo	October 15, 2024
Vintage Funfair Ride Pack	Planet Coaster 2	November 6, 2024
Thrill-Seekers Ride Pack	Planet Coaster 2	November 6, 2024
Bonus Ride Collection	Planet Coaster 2	November 6, 2024
Americas Animal Pack	Planet Zoo	April 15, 2025
Asia Animal Pack	Planet Zoo	June 25, 2025
Sorcery Pack	Planet Coaster 2	September 16, 2025
Toybox Pack	Planet Coaster 2	December 4, 2025
Parades Pack	Planet Coaster 2	June 25, 2026
Silver Screen Pack	Planet Coaster 2	August 19, 2026
Deluxe Upgrade Pack	Planet Zoo 2	October 13, 2026
Bonus Content Pack	Planet Zoo 2	October 13, 2026
Spooktacular Pack	Planet Coaster 2	October 29, 2026

== Reception ==
Aggregate review scores
Game	Metacritic
Planet Coaster	PC: 84/100; PS4: 79/100; PS5: 81/100; XONE: 85/100; XSX: 83/100
Planet Zoo	PC: 81/100; PS5: 79/100; XSX: 83/100
Planet Coaster 2	PC: 76/100; PS5: 76/100; XSX: 82/100

=== Sales ===
Planet Coaster has sold over 400,000 copies in the first month of its release. As of August 2017, one million copies had been sold, with that figure rising to two million by January 2019.

By January 2020, Planet Coaster had sold over 2.5 million copies, while Planet Zoo surpassed 1 million units sold within its first six months of release.
