= Digital Chocolate =

American video game company (2003–2014)

Digital Chocolate, Inc.
- Type: Private
- Industry: Video games
- Predecessor: The 3DO Company
- Founded: October 18, 2003
- Founder: Trip Hawkins
- Headquarters: San Mateo, California, U.S.
- Area served: Worldwide
- Key people: Işık Şekercigil (CEO)
- Number of employees: 129
- Website: https://digitalchocolate.net

Digital Chocolate, Inc. was an American video game developer and publisher headquartered in San Mateo, California. It was founded in 2003 by Trip Hawkins, the founder of video game companies Electronic Arts and The 3DO Company. The company focused on developing games for Java ME-based mobile phones, iOS, and Microsoft Windows, and made some non-entertainment titles. Its marketing motto was seize the minute.

== History ==
Digital Chocolate was founded in 2003 by Hawkins after the closure of the 3DO Company. It had operations in San Mateo, Seattle, St. Petersburg, Bangalore, Helsinki, and Mexicali.

In 2004, Digital Chocolate acquired European developer Sumea, which then became its Helsinki studio.

On August 15, 2011, Digital Chocolate agreed to acquire Sandlot Games, a leading casual game developer and publisher.

In May 2012, Trip Hawkins stepped down as CEO to move to a "consulting and advisory relationship" with the company. The company also announced plans to lay off 180 employees.

Galaxy Life is its most successful title on Facebook to date, ranking at 284th bucket of MAU (monthly active users) as of September 13, 2013. In 2013, Digital Chocolate's Barcelona studio was sold to Ubisoft with the Galaxy Life IP and the Helsinki studio was closed.

In April 2014, Digital Chocolate's four remaining Facebook games — Army Attack, Crazy Penguin Wars, Millionaire City, and Zombie Lane — were licensed to RockYou, along with the hiring of its developers to continue work on the games.

In 2026, the company re-entered the mobile gaming industry after a group of entrepreneurs acquired its brand rights and the intellectual property rights to its legacy games. The company is currently owned and led by CEO Işık Şekercigil and operates as a mobile game studio under the name Digital Chocolate LLC within British video game publisher Empire Interactive. The company's headquarters remain in San Mateo, California.

== Games ==
- 20Q: Celebrity Quiz
- 20Q: Mind Reader
- 20Q: Sports Quiz
- 2D Brick Breaker Revolution
- 3D Brick Breaker Revolution
- 3D Rollercoaster Rush
- 3D Mini Golf Challenge
- Army Attack
- Bubble Popper Deluxe
- Bumper Car City
- California Gold Rush (2009)
- California Gold Rush: Bonanza (2009-2010)
- Chocolate Shop Frenzy
- Crazy Monkey Spin
- Crazy Penguin Catapult (2007)
- Crazy Penguin Catapult 2 (2007-2009)
- Crazy Penguin Wars
- Crazy Penguin Assault (2011)
- Crazy Penguin Party (2009)
- Crazy Penguin Freezeway (2011)
- DChoc Cafe Hangman
- DChoc Cafe Solitaire
- DChoc Cafe Sudoku
- Extreme Air Snowboarding
- Foto Quest Fishing
- Galaxy Life
- Island God Beta
- Johnny Crash
- Johnny Crash Stuntman Does Texas
- Kamikaze Robots
- Kings & Warlords
- Mafia Wars
- Mafia Wars 2: Scarlottis
- Mafia Wars 3: Yakuza
- Millionaire City
- Minigolf Castles
- Mini Golf 99 Holes Theme Park
- MMA Pro Fighter
- New in Town
- Nightclub Empire
- Party Island Bowling
- Party Island Pool
- Party Island: Sexy Trivia
- Petanque: World Tour
- Pyramid Bloxx (2007)
- Redbull X Fighters
- Rollercoaster Rush (2006)
- Rollercoaster Rush 3D (2007)
- Rollercoaster Rush New York (2008-2010)
- Rollercoaster Rush 99 Tracks (2008)
- Rollercoaster Rush Underground 3D (2010-2011)
- Racing Fever GT
- Super Water Bomber
- Strip Club Manager
- Tornado Mania! (2007)
- Tower Bloxx (2005)
- Tower Bloxx Deluxe (2008)
- Tower Bloxx: New York (2009)
- Tower Bloxx: My City (2010)
- Tower Bloxx: Revolution (2011-2012)
- Santa's Tower Bloxx (2006)
- Super Water Bomber
- Zombie Lane

== Awards ==
In 2009, the company's game Brick Breaker Revolution won an IGN award for Best Artistic Design.

Mobile Entertainment named the company "best mobile games developer" in 2006 and 2007.

In 2006, Digital Chocolate received nine IGN Game of the Year awards. Its game Tornado Mania! was awarded Wireless Game of the Year with a "perfect 10" score, and the company was named Best Developer.

In 2012, the company's game Army Attack was nominated for the "Social Networking Game of the Year" in the Academy of Interactive Arts & Science's 15th Annual Interactive Achievement Awards.
