= 3D Rollercoaster Rush =

2009 video game

- App store icon
- Developer: Sumea
- Publisher: Digital Chocolate
- Platforms: iOS, Android
- Release: May 28, 2009
- Mode: Single-player

3D Rollercoaster Rush is a video game developed by Sumea and published by Digital Chocolate for the iOS and Android. 3D Rollercoaster Rush is the successor to Rollercoaster Rush.

== Gameplay ==
3D Rollercoaster Rush is a strategy game in which players have to navigate a rollercoaster train on various rollercoaster tracks. Players must try to get to the end of the track without crashing the entire train.

With each completed track, players earn a certain number of points. The number of points received depends on how well the track was completed, such as how fast the track was completed and how many and how high jumps were. Players can also earn points by getting special rewards that can be earned by doing things such as speeding up the train, or not braking. To advance to the next track, a player must earn a certain number of stars. Players can earn them by getting a certain number of points on a track. The faster the player goes, the happier passengers are after jumps, but if the cart does not land correctly, people will fly off the track.

There are three locations in the game (Australia, France, and The United States), and each location has its own set or tracks. With each location unlocked, the tracks start to get more difficult and feature new obstacles (such as loops and jumps).

== Reception ==
Levi Buchanan of IGN gave the game an 8/10, calling the game a "charming action-puzzle game with a dose of thrills." He also wrote that the game was better than its predecessor, Rollercoaster Rush 3D.
