= Army Attack =

2011 video game

- Developer: Digital Chocolate
- Platforms: Facebook, Google Plus
- Release: May 2011
- Genres: Strategy, Multiplayer
- Mode: Single player

Army Attack is a discontinued social networking strategy video game developed by Digital Chocolate's Helsinki-based studio. In Army Attack, the world has been attacked by the evil Crimson Empire, and the player's mission is to build military alliances for their army with other players to reclaim it. In 2012, for the Academy of Interactive Arts & Science's 15th Annual Interactive Achievement Awards, Army Attack was nominated for "Social Networking Game of the Year." According to App Data, in 2011, Army Attack was one of the top 5 Facebook Player vs. Player Games.

Army Attack features two gaming modes: 1) Player vs. Non-Player (PvNP): 'Liberating City & Villages' and 2) Player vs. Player (PvP): 'Versus Mode'.

During the 15th Annual Interactive Achievement Awards, the Academy of Interactive Arts & Sciences nominated Army Attack for "Social Networking Game of the Year".

This game was officially closed down on 4 November 2016.

== PvNP: "Liberating City & Villages" ==
In the PvNP: "Liberating City & Villages" mode, the main objective for players is to reconquer lands captured by the evil Crimson Empire, and, in doing so, to build up their own military and resources by building structures. The player must also launch attacks against non-player characters and accomplish other objectives to complete the single-player campaign.

== PvP: "Versus Mode" ==
In PvP mode, called "Versus," Army Attack players battle each other to increase strategic and tactical skills. On an Army Attack strategy map that is stylized for this type of play, players select their military units beforehand; the player clicks a unit, then dispatches it on the map. If the player's unit is in range of another player's unit, then an attack may be ordered.

In "Versus" mode, a weekly tournament is held amongst players where they can compete for some exclusive in-game rewards.
