= Rollercoaster Mania =

- Rollercoaster Mania Logo
- Developer(s): Noisy Duck
- Publisher(s): 6waves
- Platform(s): Facebook
- Genre(s): Theme park game
- Mode(s): Single-player

Rollercoaster Mania is a theme park game for Facebook. The game is developed by Noisy Duck and published by the 6waves. The game is based on the 1994 PC game Theme Park on iOS developed by EA, rearranged to focus on social play.

== Gameplay ==
The game is available for mobile and is played on Facebook. It can be played in full screen and with different camera angles. Players start with a small plot of land on which they build rides, food stalls and decorations, and hire entertainers. Rides and stalls are unlocked as the player proceeds in the game levels. The player has to buy rides; some rides start working as soon as they are placed, and some need materials like wood, steel and screw. Some take time to build while the others require friends to help.

A screenshot of Rollercoaster Mania

The park is open to the public for varying lengths of time. Rides will operate continuously after they are placed, but food stalls require players to periodically restock their goods according to the stock they chose. This adds a "click and wait" element to the game, as players can choose from different time limits and different rewards. Excellent food remains for 10 minutes to 1 hour, while cheaper food will remain for longer periods of time, such as 6 to 12 hours, but will cause customers to vomit, affecting the park's cleanliness ratings and requiring the player to clean it.

The player can hire entertainers and entertaining stalls to keep their guests happy and increase their entertainment ratings, as well as cleaning staff and dustbins to keep the park clean.

Player may also complete quests in the game, including placing the Flying Fish ride, placing the Hunted House, making a road, and adding decorations, rides, a burger shop, and entertainers. Friend also serve as neighbors, and players can collect goods from the trucks by visiting them, or help them by clicking on protesters in their park to earn coins and experience. The game also has an achievement system in which the player is rewarded for completing certain tasks, as well as a meter rating the park's progression.
