= Planet Zoo: Arctic Pack =

DLC for Planet Zoo

- Developer: Frontier Developments
- Publisher: Frontier Developments
- Series: Planet
- Platforms: Windows; PlayStation 5; Xbox Series X/S
- Release: 17 December 2019 (PC); 3 December 2024 (Console)
- Genre: Construction and management simulation
- Mode: Single-player

Planet Zoo: Arctic Pack is the first major downloadable content (DLC) expansion pack for the construction and management simulation video game Planet Zoo developed and released by Frontier Developments. It was released on 17 December 2019.

The expansion, containing content themed around the Arctic, adds four new animals and two new playable scenarios to the main game.

== Gameplay ==
The expansion adds four different animals to the game: the polar bear, arctic wolf, reindeer and Dall sheep. Of the two scenarios added in the expansion, the first takes place in Norway, where players build an animal sanctuary near a village on a remote island. The second, which takes place in a zoo in Mexico, tasks players with building suitable habitats for arctic animals in a desert climate.

Alongside this, the DLC also introduces over 200 new scenery pieces to the game, including festive decorations and building pieces based after Nordic architecture.

== Release ==
The expansion pack was released on 17 December 2019, alongside a regular free update for the game. It was later made available for the Console Edition on 3 December 2024, alongside the Conservation Pack.

== Reception ==
In their review of the expansion, Destructoid stated that the DLC felt a "a bit on the short side" and was "over before you know it," but called the animals "terrific, expressive, and a joy to watch." Gaming website But Why Tho? stated the Arctic Pack was "light on overall content" but still "[added] plenty to an already existing great game." French website Gameblog gave the DLC a mostly positive review, rating it 8/10. Impulse Gamer gave the DLC a 3.5/5 rating, concluding "Frontier Developments have set the bar for their DLC offerings excitingly high, and if the rest of their additional content is as impressive as the Arctic Pack then the future for Planet Zoo is looking bright." Invision Game Community gave it a 4.5/5 star rating, calling it "good value for money" but felt the new content was "over too soon".

Game Rant placed it fifth in their ranking of Planet Zoo DLCs, stating "[p]olar bears by themselves are enough to make the Arctic Pack a great DLC, and, for lovers of these iconic bears, it's a must-have."
