= NoLimits =

Roller Coaster Simulation Software

NoLimits Roller Coaster Simulation
- Stable release: 1.8 / 3 July 2011
- Operating system: Microsoft Windows and Mac OS X
- Type: Roller coaster designer and simulator
- Website: www.nolimitscoaster.com

NoLimits Roller Coaster Simulation is a software package available for Microsoft Windows and Mac OS X designed and built by a team of programmers and artists led by German programmer Ole Lange. It was first released in November 2001. The package includes two separate pieces of software, the NoLimits Editor and NoLimits Simulator, with a third application of the game, the NoLimits Terraformer supported as well.

== Software ==
The "NoLimits Editor" allows the design of a roller coaster with surrounding scenery. Track editing is based on adjacent bézier curves and allows nearly infinite design possibilities all packed in a CAD-based graphical user interface. Scenery objects can be placed in the editor, provided they are of the .3ds format. The software allows a number of popular roller coaster types to be designed, based on industrially engineered designs.

The "Simulator" allows the designed roller coaster to be viewed in full 3D, either riding the roller coaster like a rider, or watching it in a third person perspective, from a fixed position or behind the roller coaster train. 3D acceleration is provided by OpenGL. It is also possible to view technical information, such as "speed" and "G-forces". These measurements are nearly exact to real-life situations.

The "Terraformer" allows the creation of a detailed landscape around the ride area, to simulate an actual environment. It has the ability to change the textures, water levels and placement of trees and other scenery to create a realistic environment. Some designers, who wish for a more flexible terrain design, create large 3D models of terrain, which allow for more complicated elements such as tunnels, buildings, and pathways. The Terraformer was created by Gravimetric Studios for use in the package, and is considered a third-party application for use with the official suite.

== Industrial use ==
According to the NoLimits official website, the software has been used by amusement park related companies showcasing new rides for prospective parks and guests. Such companies include Vekoma, Intamin, Gerstlauer, MACK Rides, and Zamperla.

Companies have been licensing roller coaster styles to NoLimits including:

- Vekoma Motorbike Coaster
- Gerstlauer Euro-Fighter
- MackRides

It has also been modified as a proof of concept for certain prototype rides, including the UniCoaster prototype. A demo can be downloaded from the website, which is a customized version of the NoLimits Simulator.

== Available types of roller coasters ==
Due to the free form style of the Editor and the CAD based interface the creation of different types of roller coasters is not limited by the style of track chosen for the simulation, and as such Wooden roller coasters can have the same elements as a Steel roller coaster, whilst not being "true to life". Below is a list of the track types (with train combinations) that are included in the Simulator.

Track Style in Simulator	Real Life Track Style	Train Configurations
4d Coaster	4th Dimension roller coaster	Arrow Dynamics/S&S style
Classic/Modern Looping Coaster	Steel roller coaster	Schwarzkopf style, Classic and Modern
Corkscrew Coaster	Corkscrew roller coaster	Corkscrew (Arrow Dynamics, Vekoma)
Inverted (2 seat and 4 seat) Coaster	Inverted roller coaster	Bolliger & Mabillard (4 across) and Vekoma (2 across, SLC style)
Twister/Floorless/Stand-up Coaster Style	Floorless/Stand-up	Bolliger & Mabillard, Sit down, floorless and stand up style.
Hyper Coaster	Hypercoaster/Giga coaster	Bolliger & Mabillard (4 across, single row), Intamin (2 across, 2 rows)
Hybrid Coaster	Steel track with wooden supports in the style of an I-Box roller coaster	Rocky Mountain Construction style (2 across, 2 rows)
Wooden Coaster Style	Wooden roller coaster	Great Coasters International style (Trailered 2 across, single row), International Amusement Devices/D. H. Morgan Manufacturing style (Trailered 2 across, 2 rows), Philadelphia Toboggan Coasters style (Classic 4 seater and 6 seater cars), and Gravity Group style (2 across, single row)
LIM Launched Coaster	Launched roller coaster	Premier Rides style
Mack Launch Coaster	Launched roller coaster	Mack Rides style
Inverted Shuttle Coaster (Face to Face and Impulse)	Shuttle roller coaster	Vekoma Invertigo style (face to face), Intamin Impulse style
Vekoma Flying Dutchman Coaster	Flying roller coaster	Flying style trains
Gerstlauer/Maurer Söhne Spinning Coaster	Spinning roller coaster	Gerstlauer/Maurer Söhne style cars
Gerstlauer Euro Fighter Coaster/Gerstlauer Euro Fighter 2	Steel roller coaster	Gerstlauer Euro Fighter (1 and 2) cars
Vekoma Motorbike Coaster	Steel roller coaster	Vekoma Motorbike style trains
Gerstlauer Bobsled Coaster	Steel roller coaster	Gerstlauer Bobsled style cars
Vekoma Mine Train Coaster	Mine train roller coaster	Vekoma Mine Train style cars with and without locomotive
Maurer Söhne X-Car Coaster	Steel roller coaster	Maurer Söhne X-Car style cars with lap restraints, suitable for inversions
Zamperla Twister Coaster	Zamperla Twister Coaster	Zamperla Twister Coaster style cars, they have the shape of a mouse.

Notes

- Launched track styles are available to any one of the above, so strata coasters can be designed using any one of the styles.
- Hyper/Giga coasters are possible with any style above.
- Inversions are possible with any style above.
- Boomerang roller coasters are possible using any coaster style.
- Many styles can be manipulated to assume different designs, and as such designers regularly use train styles and track designs as a "best fit" for a type of roller coaster, or type of train. For example, a B&M hyper train might run on invisible track above a Maurer X-Car model with an identical layout emulating the look of an S&S 4-across launch coaster.

== Third-party software ==
"NoLimits Track Packager" allows the user to create a package file containing car-textures, environments and scenery files using a track file.

Newton 2 was released on 20 September 2009. Newton 2 is a NoLimits 1 add-on created by Entropy that allows you to create roller coaster track based on forces rather than shaping; This method of track building is commonly referred to as "Force Vector Design". This is where you specify the g-forces you want to achieve and then Newton 2 will shape the track to achieve those forces.

Several other programs are also designed for NoLimits, such as "NoLimits Construction Kit" and "NoLimits Elementary".

== Sequel ==
Creator Ole Lange mentioned on his personal website that Nolimits Coaster 2 would offer to fix some of the outstanding bugs in the original NoLimits Coaster simulator. No longer would it have 2 separate applications, but rather have a more WYSIWYG approach. Another included feature is package management. Lange said that he planned to maintain the NL1.x project while NL2 is still too far away.

NoLimits 2 was released on 10 January 2014. As well as features from the original simulator, NoLimits 2 also includes transfer tracks, storage blocks, greatly improved graphics and more.
