= Planet Coaster =

2016 video game by Frontier Developments

- Developer: Frontier Developments
- Publisher: Frontier Developments
- Directors: James Dixon; Gary Richards
- Producers: Richard Newbold; Steve Wilkins; Lloyd Morgan Moore; Luke Hale; Joseph Phillips
- Designer: Andrew Fletcher
- Programmer: Oscar Cooper
- Artists: John Laws; Matthew Preece; Marc Cox; Sam Denney
- Composers: Jim Guthrie; J. J. Ipsen
- Series: Planet
- Engine: Cobra Engine v4
- Platforms: Windows; PlayStation 4; Xbox One; Xbox Series X/S; PlayStation 5; macOS
- Release: 17 November 2016: Windows; WW: 17 November 2016; PlayStation 4, Xbox One, Xbox Series X/S; WW: 10 November 2020; PlayStation 5; NA: 12 November 2020; AU: 12 November 2020; EU: 19 November 2020; macOS; WW: 17 November 2020
- Genre: Construction and management simulation
- Mode: Single-player

Planet Coaster is a business simulation video game developed and published by Frontier Developments for Windows. It was released worldwide on 17 November 2016. Frontier had previously worked in the amusement park construction and management simulation genre with RollerCoaster Tycoon 3 (to which Planet Coaster is a spiritual successor), Thrillville, Thrillville: Off the Rails, and Zoo Tycoon. A version for PlayStation 4, Xbox One, and Xbox Series X/S, known as Planet Coaster: Console Edition, was released worldwide on 10 November 2020. The PlayStation 5 version was released in North America and Australia on 12 November 2020 and in Europe on 19 November 2020. A macOS version, developed by Aspyr, was later released on 17 November 2020 on both Steam and Mac App Store.

There are four different modes in the game, namely Sandbox, Challenge, Career, and Scenario Editor. In the career mode, players assume the role of a theme park manager and must complete tasks such as constructing unfinished roller coasters or hiring janitors. In Sandbox mode, players are tasked to construct their own theme park on an empty plot of land. The challenge mode is similar to the sandbox mode, but with added difficulty, as players need to take funds into account. The scenario editor mode, which was added in the 1.4.0 update on 22 November 2017, is similar to the career mode, but allows players to customise their own task in all saved parks.

Originally called Coaster Park Tycoon, the game was revealed on 29 January 2015 and was renamed during E3 2015. Planet Coaster is Frontier's second self-published franchise, following Elite Dangerous. Frontier organised multiple alpha and beta tests before launching the game in November 2016. The game was supported with free as well as paid post-release downloadable content upon launch. The title received positive reviews upon release, with critics praising the game's sandbox mode and creation tools. Criticism was mainly directed to the game's career mode. It was a commercial success, with more than 2.5 million copies sold as of January 2020.

A sequel, Planet Coaster 2, released for PC, PlayStation 5 and Xbox Series X and Series S on 6 November 2024.

== Gameplay ==
Promotional image of guests riding a pirate ship ride

Planet Coaster is a construction and management simulation video game. Similar to its spiritual predecessor, the game allows players to build different theme park rides and roller-coasters.

Before starting the game on the computer version, the player must create their own avatar. This game function though, is not used or even done in the Console versions. Afterward, the player is able to choose between four game modes: sandbox, challenge, career, and scenario editor.

Similar to Frontier's previous game, RollerCoaster Tycoon 3, the Sandbox Mode enables players to construct their own theme park on an empty plot of land. In Sandbox Mode, all features and rides of the game are unlocked and the player's funds are unlimited. This is the mode most players use to create items (parks, coasters, scenery, etc.) and then post them to Steam's Planet Coaster Workshop (not available for Mac App Store version), or the Frontier Workshop on the console versions.

In the Challenge Mode, the player must construct an amusement park on an empty lot (similar to Sandbox Mode) but with limited funds and research depending on chosen difficulty—Easy, Medium, or Hard. As the player develops their park, the game presents the player with challenges that the player must accept or decline. (Note: This function is not available on console, the challenges are just given to the player.) Upon completion of a challenge, the player is given a reward such as a park rating boost or a sum of money.

In the Career Mode, the player must complete objectives such as constructing roller coasters, achieving park ratings or hiring janitors. Similar to RollerCoaster Tycoon 3, Career Mode allows players to progress by completing scenarios with objectives in different difficulties.

On 26 April 2017, Frontier revealed the existence of several cheat codes that were previously undiscovered on their official forums. These included the ability to drive go-karts and the ability for security guards to plough through guests similar to a bulldozer.

On 22 November 2017, the Scenario Editor mode was added in 1.4.0 update, which same to Career Mode, but allow player customize their own objectives in all saved parks, then post them to Steam's Planet Coaster Workshop.

The console edition has various differences from the PC/Mac version, such as a tutorial, a revamped career mode with voice acting, and a counter that tells the player how much they can place in their park.

== Development ==
Concept art of an animatronic redcoat

Before the development of Planet Coaster, Frontier Developments had developed several other construction and management simulation video games, including 2004's commercial and critical success RollerCoaster Tycoon 3, which sold over 10 million copies. Planet Coaster serves only as a spiritual successor to RollerCoaster Tycoon 3 instead of a direct sequel, as the company considered the use of the brand Tycoon "didn't carry the cachet anymore" due to the releases of mainly poorly-received Tycoon games in recent years. In a December 2016 interview with Cambridge News, David Walsh (the Chief Operating Officer of Frontier Developments) said that the success of Elite Dangerous enabled the company "to bring Planet Coaster to the market, which is highly significant as it demonstrates we are not a single game company". Frontier Developments spent $6 million on the game's development and an additional $1.5 million on marketing.

The game was announced on 29 January 2015, by Frontier Developments. Originally called Coaster Park Tycoon, the game was renamed into Planet Coaster on 16 June 2015, during the PC Gaming Show at E3 2015. Frontier Developments aimed to turn the game into the company's second self-published franchise, along with the Elite series. The game uses an advanced version of the Cobra engine, which is an in-house proprietary engine developed by Frontier previously used by games like Elite Dangerous and RollerCoaster Tycoon 3. Features confirmed for the game include a hybrid spline/piece-by-piece coaster builder, modular structure building, a voxel terrain editor among others detailed through Q&A's and "Dev Diaries." On the second live stream, the release date of the alpha was announced. Released on 22 March 2016, the alpha emphasized on modular building and paths. The alpha contained two themes: "Planet Coaster" and "Pirate". Although disabled by default, Coaster Building was included in the first alpha through a cheat code.

On 24 May 2016, Frontier released the second alpha build. This build included finances, terrain tools, improved path building, and the official release of a coaster builder. Also, on 25 August, Frontier discontinued further alpha purchases. On 24 September, Frontier announced at EGX 2016 that players who had pre-ordered the "Thrillseeker Edition" would be able to test the game that October. At Gamescom 2016, Frontier announced that the game would be released on 17 November 2016. The game was released with Denuvo's anti-tamper technology.

To record the audio for the game, sound designer Watson Wu took over the Holiday World & Splashin' Safari theme park in Santa Claus, Indiana, to record the sounds of various attractions. Guests in the park and park staff speak their own fictional language, known as "Planco". According to James Stant, Frontier's senior audio designer, the language contains about 7,000 words. After the game's release, Frontier Developments released an official Planco dictionary.

=== Soundtrack ===
Planet Coaster features an adaptive soundtrack composed by Jim Guthrie and JJ Ipsen, released under the album titled You, Me & Gravity: The Music of Planet Coaster. Additionally, players may upload their own sound files to use in their parks.

=== Downloadable content ===
On 21 July 2017, Frontier launched paid downloadable content for the game featuring props inspired by Back to the Future, Knight Rider, and The Munsters.

In August 2017, Frontier partnered with Cedar Point to provide an in-game version of the park's upcoming Steel Vengeance roller coaster before the ride officially opened in 2018.

On 21 September 2018, Frontier announced the "Thememaker's Toolkit". This toolkit will enable players to import custom 3D models into Planet Coaster itself. This was released on 20 November.

The console version adds in an exclusive coaster for those who pre-ordered the game.

Name	Release date	Description
Winter Update	15 December 2016	The Winter Update added new rides, blueprints, stores, and staff features. One of the newly added rides, the "Collider", was determined by a community vote.
Spring Update	April 2017	The Spring Update added new rides and a crime system.
Summer Update	27 June 2017	The Summer Update added the ability to create firework shows, such as for the American Independence Day, New Year's Day, and Bonfire Night. Furthermore, the fireworks can be triggered by other events in the park and can be synced to custom music. This update also added the ability to add customizable images and video into the game.
Spooky Pack	25 September 2017	The Spooky Pack is a paid DLC pack that includes over 200 new building and scenery pieces as well as two new tracked ride types and a new entertainer, "King Ghoster".
Anniversary Update	22 November 2017	The free Anniversary update included several new rides and roller coasters in addition to picnic benches and a custom scenario editor - other smaller features allow for interchangeable coaster cars and relaxed track restrictions. More management features were also introduced including more control over vendors and staff rooms for tired employees.
Adventure Pack	18 December 2017	The Adventure Pack is a paid DLC pack that includes new water boat rides, a swinging mine train roller coaster and 320 new scenery and building pieces in addition to a new entertainer, "Renée Feu".
Studios Pack	27 March 2018	The Studios Pack is a paid DLC pack inspired by movie studio theme parks such as Disney's Hollywood Studios and Universal Studios. This pack includes new scenery, animatronics and three dark ride systems. This was released alongside a free update containing hotels, glass walls and path tunneling.
Vintage Pack	10 July 2018	The Vintage Pack is a paid DLC pack inspired by classic amusement parks. It includes new coasters, rides, scenery and audio. This was released alongside a free update containing a wild mouse coaster, vending machines, camera effects, scenery grouping, and custom staff uniform coloring.
World's Fair Pack	16 October 2018	The World's Fair Pack is a paid DLC pack introduction theming elements inspired by ten different countries. It includes new coasters, a transport ride and scenery.
Magnificent Rides Collection	18 December 2018	The Magnificent Rides Collection is a paid DLC pack that features 10 new rides including attractions based on Vekoma, Schwarzkopf and Mack Rides roller coasters. This pack features little theming elements compared to previous DLCs.
Classic Rides Collection	18 April 2019	Like the Magnificent Rides Collection, the Classic Rides collection adds in 10 rides. This was released along with a free update that contains a virtual recreation of Carowinds' Copperhead Strike coaster.
Ghostbusters	Released: 4 June 2019 Discontinued: 4 September 2024	Ghostbusters is a paid DLC pack featuring a story-driven scenario, new gameplay mechanics, new rides, characters and scenery from the classic 1984 film, Ghostbusters. The pack also features Dan Aykroyd reprising his original role as Raymond Stantz and William Atherton as Walter Peck. This was released along with free downloadable content containing a shooting dark ride.

== Reception ==
Reception

Aggregate scores
Aggregator	Score
Metacritic	PC: 84/100; PS4: 79/100; PS5: 81/100; XONE: 85/100; XSX: 83/100
OpenCritic	PC: 84% Console: 83%

Review scores
Publication	Score
Destructoid	7.5/10
Edge	8/10
Game Informer	8.25/10
GameRevolution	4.5/5
GameSpot	9/10
IGN	8.5/10
PC Gamer (US)	75/100

The game was met with praise upon release of the alpha. Andy Kelly of PC Gamer commented that Frontier was "off to a tremendous start", adding that creating buildings with the creation tools hinted at "immense possibilities". However, Mark Walton of Ars Technica noted several small flaws including the "hard to navigate" menus and the lack of custom built roller coasters. On 27 April 2016, about a month after the release of the alpha, Frontier announced that Planet Coaster had grossed nearly two million dollars.

Matt Wales of Eurogamer recommended the game, concluding that the game is "the finest simulator yet". Meanwhile, Ben Reeves of Game Informer praised the game for its creative mode but criticized the game's career mode, referring to it as "boring" and "tedious". TJ Hafer of IGN compared the game's integration of Steam Workshop to Minecraft and Second Life. Edmond Tran of GameSpot praised the game for its accessible creative tools and for its evocative tone. Jonathan Leack of Game Revolution claimed that the game "resurrected the [theme park simulation] genre". In a critical review of the game, Jody Macgregor of PC Gamer praised the game's challenge mode but criticized the game for not innovating enough from RollerCoaster Tycoon 3. The original score (70/100) was retracted due to miscommunication between Frontier Developments and PC Gamer with the game version they received; its reevaluated score is 75/100. Patrick Hancock of Destructoid noted that the game suffers frame rate issues in larger parks. Furthermore, Edge noted that the game's "fiddly" camera makes some actions harder.

In 2020, Rock, Paper, Shotgun rated Planet Coaster in their top 10 management games for the PC.

Many fans made favourable comparisons to RollerCoaster Tycoon World, which received largely negative reviews. The game has "very positive" reviews on Steam.

=== Sales ===
Upon release, the game topped the Steam "top sellers" charts. The game sold over 400,000 copies in the first month of its release. Despite being released in the later part of the year, Planet Coaster was featured on Steam's "Top 100 Best Sellers of 2016" chart as a "silver tier" game. In August 2017, the game sold its one millionth copy. In July 2018, a leak in Valve's API revealed that over 1.68 million Steam users owned Planet Coaster. Two million copies of the games were sold by January 2019. As of January 2020, 2.5 million copies of the game had been sold.

== Accolades ==
Year	Award	Category	Result	Ref.
2017	13th British Academy Games Awards	British Game	Nominated	
2017	Develop Industry Excellence Awards	Animation	Nominated	
2017	Develop Industry Excellence Awards	Music Design	Nominated	
2017	Develop Industry Excellence Awards	New Games IP	Nominated	
2017	Develop Industry Excellence Awards	Sound Design	Nominated	

== Sequel ==
A sequel, Planet Coaster 2, released on 6 November 2024. The sequel allows players to build water parks, with the ability to construct pools and waterslides. The sequel also gives players the ability to add tilt tracks, track switches, and turntables to their roller coasters.
