= List of role-playing video games: 2008 to 2009 =

This is a comprehensive index of commercial role-playing video games (RPGs), sorted chronologically by year. Information regarding release platform, release type, RPG subgenre, game setting, developers, publishers, and country of origin is provided where available. The table can be sorted by clicking on the small boxes next to the column headings.

This list includes all RPG subgenres, including MMORPGs, Action RPGs and Tactical RPGs. This list does not include MUDs and Roguelikes by default, unless they have an additional RPG subgenre. For standalone lists on these subgenres, see List of MUDs and List of roguelikes

== Legend ==
Video game platforms
DS	Nintendo DS, DSiWare, iQue DS	iPod	Term not found	LIN	Linux, SteamOS
MAC	Classic Mac OS, 2001 and before	MOBI	Mobile phone	OSX	macOS
PS2	PlayStation 2	PS3	PlayStation 3	PSN	PlayStation Network
PSP	PlayStation Portable	VC	Term not found	WEB	Browser game
Wii	Wii, WiiWare, Wii Virtual Console	WIN	Windows, all versions Windows 95 and up	X360	(replace with XB360)

Types of releases
Compilation	A compilation, anthology or collection of several titles, usually (but not always) belonging to the same series
Early access	A game launched in early access is unfinished and thus might contain bugs and glitches or have some of the content missing
Episodic	An episodic video game that is released in batches over a period of time
Expansion	A large-scale DLC to an already existing game that adds new story, areas and additions and/or changes to the game's mechanics
Full release	A full release of a game that launched in early access first
Limited	A special release (often called "Limited" or "Collector's Edition") with bonus collector's material. Often provided to people who pre-order a game
Port	The game first appeared on a different platform and a port was made. The game is like the original, with few or no differences
Remake	The game is an enhanced remake of an original, made using a new engine and/or assets and thus containing completely new sound, graphics and possibly changes to the story and/or gameplay
Remaster	The game is a remaster of an original, released on the same or different platform, with (usually minor) changes to graphics, sound and/or gameplay
Rerelease	The game was re-released on the same platform with no or only minor changes

Video game genres
Action RPG	Action role-playing game	Dungeon crawl	Dungeon crawl	JRPG	Japanese-style role-playing game
MMORPG	Massively multiplayer online RPG	Monster tamer	Monster-taming game	MUD	Multi-user dungeon
Real-time	Real-time game	Roguelike	Roguelike, Roguelite	Sandbox	Sandbox game
Soulslike	Soulslike	Tactical RPG	Tactical role-playing game	Turn-based	Turn-based game

== List ==
Year	Title	Developer	Publisher	Setting	Platform	Subgenre	Series/Notes	COO
2008 (??)	Arc the Lad III	ARC		Fantasy	PSN (Port)	Tactical RPG	Port of Arc the Lad III.	
2008 (JP)	Blue Dragon Plus	Feel Plus		Fantasy	DS (Port)	Tactical RPG		
2008 (JP)	Brave Fencer Musashi	Square	Square Enix	Fantasy	PSN (Port)	Action RPG	Port of Brave Fencer Musashi for PS1.	
2008 (JP/NA); 2009 (PAL)	Chrono Trigger	Square Enix	Square Enix	Fantasy	DS (Port)		Port of Chrono Trigger for SNES. Series debuts.	
2008 (JP)	Crystal Guardians			Fantasy	MOBI		Sequel to Final Fantasy Tactics A2. Released in chapters.	
2008 (NA/PAL/JP)	Dark Messiah of Might and Magic: Elements	Arkane; Ubisoft	Ubisoft	Fantasy	X360 (Remake)	Action RPG	Remake of Dark Messiah of Might and Magic for WIN.	
2008 (JP); 2009 (NA)	Devil Summoner: Kuzunoha Raidō Tai Abaddon Ō	Atlus		Fantasy	PS2	Action RPG	Sequel to Shin Megami Tensei: Devil Summoner: Raidou Kuzunoha vs. The Soulless Army.	
2008 (JP)	Devil Summoner: Kuzunoha Raidō Tai Abaddon Ō Plus	Atlus		Fantasy	PS2 (Comp)	Action RPG	Compilation of Devil Summoner: Kuzunoha Raidō Tai Abaddon Ō and Shin Megami Tensei: Nocturne.	
2008 (JP/NA)	Disgaea 3: Absence of Justice (EN) 魔界戦記ディスガイア3 (JA)	Nippon Ichi		Fantasy	PS3	Tactical RPG	Sequel to Disgaea 2: Cursed Memories.	
2008 (??)	Disgaea DS	Nippon Ichi	Atlus	Fantasy	DS (Port)	Tactical RPG	Port of Disgaea: Afternoon of Darkness for PSP.	
2008 (JP); 2009 (NA); TBA (EU)	Dragon Quest V: Hand of the Heavenly Bride	ArtePiazza	Square Enix	Fantasy	DS (Remake)	JRPG	Remake of Dragon Quest V: Tenku no Hanayome for SNES. Sequel to Dragon Quest IV.	
2008 (??)	Drone Tactics	Success	Atlus	Fantasy; Modern	DS	Tactical RPG		
2008 (JP/NA)	Eternal Poison	Flight-Plan	Banpresto; Atlus	Fantasy	PS2	Tactical RPG		
2008 (JP/NA); 2009 (EU)	Eternal Sonata	tri-Crescendo	Namco Bandai	Fantasy	PS3 (Port)		Port of Eternal Sonata for X360.	
2008 (JP/NA)	Etrian Odyssey II: Heroes of Lagaard	Atlus	Atlus	Fantasy	DS		Sequel to Etrian Odyssey for DS.	
2008 (NA/EU/AU)	Fable 2	Lionhead	Microsoft	Fantasy	X360	Action RPG		
2008 (NA/EU/AU)	Fallout 3	Bethesda	Bethesda; ZeniMax Media	Post-apocalyptic	PS3; X360	FPS/RPG		
2008 (JP); 2009 (NA/EU); 2011 (AU)	Final Fantasy IV: The After Years	Matrix Software	Square Enix	Fantasy	MOBI, WII, PSP	Turn-based	Sequel to Final Fantasy IV	JP
2008 (JP/NA/PAL)	Final Fantasy Crystal Chronicles: My Life as a King	Square Enix	Square Enix	Fantasy	Wii			
2008 (JP)	Fire Emblem: Thracia 776	Intelligent	Nintendo	Fantasy	VC (Port)	Tactical RPG	Port of Fire Emblem: Thracia 776 for SNES. Followup to Fire Emblem: Seisen no Keifu.	
2008 (JP); 2012 (WW)	Fortune Summoners: Secret of the Elemental Stone	Lizsoft	JP: Lizsoft; WW: Carpe Fulgur	Fantasy	WIN	Action RPG		JP
2008 (JP); 2009 (NA/AU)	Fossil Fighters (EN) ぼくらはカセキホリダー (JA)	Nintendo, Red Entertainment, M2, Artdink	Nintendo		DS	Turn-based		
2008 (JP); 2012 (WW)	From the Abyss	Sonic Powered	JP: Sonic Powered; NA: Aksys Games; EU: Nobilis Publishing	Fantasy	DS	Action RPG		JP
2008 (INT)	Geneforge 5: Overthrow	Spiderweb	Spiderweb	Fantasy	MAC		Sequel to Geneforge 4: Rebellion.	
2008 (JP)	Hercules no Eikō: Tamashii no Shōmei	Paon	Nintendo	Fantasy	DS		Sequel to Hercules no Eikō IV: Kamigami kara no Okurimono.	
2008 (JP)	Hercules no Eikō III: Kamigami no Chinmoku	Data East		Fantasy	MOBI (Port)		Port of Hercules no Eikō III: Kamigami no Chinmoku for SNES. Sequel to Hercules no Eikō II: Titan no Metsubō.	
2008 (NA/EU/JP)	Infinite Undiscovery (EN) インフィニット アンディスカバリー (JA)	tri-Ace	Square Enix	Fantasy	X360	Action RPG		
2008 (NA)	Kingdom of Paradise; Key of Heaven	Climax	SCE	Fantasy	PSN (Port)	Action RPG	Port of Kingdom of Paradise for PSP.	
2008 (JP)	Knights in the Nightmare	Sting		Fantasy	DS		Sequel to Yggdra Union: We'll Never Fight Alone for GBA.	
2008 (JP)	The Legend of Heroes: Trails in the Sky the 3rd (EN) 英雄伝説「空の軌跡 the 3rd」 (JA)	Nihon Falcom	Nihon Falcom	Fantasy	PSP (Port)		Sequel to The Legend of Heroes: Trails in the Sky SC.	
2008 (NA/EU); 2007 (JP)	Lost Odyssey (EN) ロストオデッセイ (JA)	Microsoft Game Studios	feelplus	Fantasy	X360			
2008 (JP/NA)	Luminous Arc 2 Will (EN) ルミナスアーク2 ウィル (JA)	Image Epoch	Marvelous	Fantasy	DS	Tactical RPG	Sequel to Luminous Arc.	
2008 (JP); 2009 (NA)	Mana-Khemia Gakuen no Renkinjutsushi-tachi Plus	Gust	Gust; Nippon Ichi	Fantasy	PSP (Port)		Port of Mana Khemia: Alchemists of Al-Revis for PS2.	
2008 (JP)	Mana Khemia 2	Gust	Gust; Nippon Ichi	Fantasy	PS2		Sequel to Mana Khemia: Alchemists of Al-Revis.	
2008 (JP); 2009 (NA/PAL)	Monster Hunter Freedom Unite (EN) モンスターハンターポータブル2nd G (JA)	Capcom	Capcom	Fantasy	PSP (Remake)	Action RPG	Remake of Monster Hunter Freedom 2 for PSP.	
2008 (JP); 2009 (NA)	Nostalgia	Matrix; Red Ent.	Tecmo	Fantasy	DS	JRPG		
2008 (FR)	OFF	Unproductive Fun Time			PC	RPG		
2008 (JP)	Phantasy Star Zero	Sonic Team	Sega	Sci-Fi	DS			
2008 (??)	Phantasy Star II	Sega-AM7	Sega	Sci-Fi	VC (Port)	JRPG	Port of Phantasy Star II for SMS.	
2008 (JP)	Phantasy Star Complete Collection			Sci-Fi	PS2 (Port)		Port of Phantasy Star Collection for SAT.	
2008 (JP)	Poison Pink	Flight-Plan		Fantasy	PS2	Tactical RPG		
2008 (JP)	Pokémon Platinum	Game Freak	Nintendo; The Pokémon Company	Modern; Fantasy	DS (Remake)		Remake to Pokémon Diamond and Pokémon Pearl.	
2008 (JP/NA)	Rhapsody: A Musical Adventure	Nippon Ichi	Atlus	Fantasy	DS (Remake)	JRPG	Remake of Rhapsody: A Musical Adventure for DC.	
2008 (JP)	RIZ-ZOAWD	Media.Vision	d3 Publisher	Fantasy	DS	JRPG	Based on The Wizard of Oz.	
2008 (JP); 2010 (NA)	Sands of Destruction	imageepoch	Sega	Sci-Fi	DS	JRPG		
2008 (JP)	Shin Megami Tensei III: Nocturne Maniax Chronicle Edition	Atlus		Fantasy		JRPG	Remake and compilation of Shin Megami Tensei III: Nocturne and Devil Summoner: Kuzunoha Raidō Tai Abaddon Ō.	
2008 (NA)	Silverfall			Fantasy	PSP (Port)	Action RPG	Port of Silverfall for Windows.	
2008 (NA/EU)	Song Summoner: The Unsung Heroes	Square Enix	Square Enix	Fantasy	iPod	Tactical RPG		
2008 (JP); 2009 (NA/PAL)	Suikoden Tierkreis; Genso Suikoden Tierkreis	Konami	Konami	Fantasy	DS	JRPG		
2008 (JP/EU/NA)	Super Mario RPG	Square	Nintendo	Fantasy	VC (Port)	JRPG	Port of Super Mario RPG for SNES.	
2008 (JP)	Super Robot Wars A Portable	Banpresto	Banpresto	Sci-Fi	PSP (Remake)	Tactical RPG	Remake of Super Robot Wars A for GBA.	
2008 (JP)	Tales of Destiny: Directors Cut	Wolf Team	Namco	Fantasy	PS2 (Remake)	Action RPG	Remake of Tales of Destiny for PS1.	
2008 (JP)	Tales of Hearts	Namco Tales	Namco Bandai	Fantasy	DS	JRPG		
2008 (JP)	Tales of Rebirth	Namco	Namco	Fantasy	PSP (Port)	Action RPG	Port of Tales of Rebirth for PS2.	
2008 (JP/NA)	Tales of Symphonia: Knight of Ratatosk	Namco Tales	Namco Bandai	Fantasy	Wii	Action RPG	Sequel to Tales of Symphonia.	
2008 (JP/NA); 2009 (EU)	Tales of Vesperia	Namco Tales	Namco Bandai	Fantasy	X360	Action RPG		
2008 (JP)	Tears to Tiara: Kakan no Daichi	Aquaplus	Aquaplus	Fantasy	PS3 (Port)	Tactical RPG	Port of Tears to Tiara for Windows.	
2008 (JP/NA/EU)	Valkyria Chronicles; Battlefield Valkyria: Gallian Chronicles 戦場のヴァルキュリア (JA)	Sega	Sega	Fantasy	PS3	Tactical RPG		
2008 (JP); 2009 (NA/PAL)	Valkyrie Profile: Toga wo Seou Mono (EN) ヴァルキリープロファイル 咎を背負う者 (JA)	tri-Ace	Square Enix	Fantasy	DS	JRPG		
2008 (??)	Vantage Master Portable; VM Portable ヴァンテージマスターポータブル (JA)	Nihon Falcom	Nihon Falcom	Fantasy	PSP (Port)	Tactical RPG	Port of Vantage Master.	
2008 (INT)	Vay	Somoga		Fantasy; Sci-Fi	MOBI (Remake)	JRPG	Remake of Vay for SCD.	
2008 (JP); 2010 (NA/EU)	White Knight Chronicles	Level-5	SCE	Fantasy	PS3	JRPG		
2008 (INT)	Witcher, The: Versus	one2tribe		Fantasy	WEB		Spin-off of The Witcher for Windows.	
2008 (JP)	Xenogears	Square	Square Enix	Sci-Fi	PSN (Port)	JRPG	Port of Xenogears for PS1.	
2008 (JP/NA)	Yggdra Union: We'll Never Fight Alone (EN) ユグドラ・ユニオン (JA)	Sting	Sting; Atlus	Fantasy	PSP (Port)	Tactical RPG	Port of Yggdra Union: We'll Never Fight Alone for GBA. Sequel to Riviera: The Promised Land for WSC.	
2008 (??)	Ys I: Ancient Ys Vanished	Nihon Falcom		Fantasy	DS (Port)	Action RPG	Port of Ys I: Ancient Ys Vanished for PC88.	
2008 (??)	Zoids Assault	Atlus		Sci-Fi	X360	Tactical RPG		
2009 (JP)	7th Dragon	Imageepoch	Sega	Fantasy	DS	Action RPG		
2009 (JP); 2010 (NA/EU)	Blue Dragon: Awakened Shadow	Mistwalker tri-Crescendo	JP/EU: Namco Bandai Games; NA: D3 Publisher	Fantasy	DS	Action RPG	Blue Dragon	JP
2009 (JP)	Dengeki Gakuen RPG: Cross of Venus	ASCII Media Works	ASCII Media Works	Fantasy	DS	Action RPG		
2009 (PAL); 2010 (NA)	Divinity II – Ego Draconis	Larian	dtp	Fantasy	X360	Action RPG	Sequel to Divine Divinity for Windows.	
2009 (JP); 2010 (NA/PAL)	Dragon Quest IX: Sentinels of the Starry Skies (EN) ドラゴンクエストIX 星空の守り人 (JA)	Level-5	Square Enix	Fantasy	DS	JRPG	Sequel to Dragon Quest VIII: Journey of the Cursed King for PS2.	
2009 (JP/NA)	Final Fantasy Crystal Chronicles: The Crystal Bearers	Square Enix	Square Enix	Fantasy	Wii	Action RPG		
2009 (JP); 2010 (NA/PAL)	Final Fantasy XIII	Square Enix	Square Enix	Fantasy	PS3, X360			
2009 (INT)	Geneforge 5: Overthrow	Spiderweb	Spiderweb	Fantasy	Win (Port)		Sequel to Geneforge 4: Rebellion. Port of Geneforge 5: Overthrow for MAC.	
2009 (NA/PAL)	Jagged Alliance DS	Strategy First; Cypron	Empire	Fantasy	DS (Port)	Tactical RPG	Port of Jagged Alliance for DOS.	
2009 (NA/PAL)	Marvel Ultimate Alliance 2: Fusion	Vicarious Visions; Savage n-Space	Activision	Sci-Fi; Fantasy	DS, PS2, PS3, PSP, Wii, X360	Action RPG	Sequel to Marvel: Ultimate Alliance for various platforms.	
2009 (JP); 2010 (NA/PAL)	Monster Hunter 3 (tri-)	Capcom	Capcom		Wii	Action RPG		
2009 (JP)	Sacred Blaze セイクリッドブレイズ (JA)	Flight-Plan	Banpresto	Fantasy	PS2	Tactical RPG		
2009 (JP)	Tales of Graces	Namco	Namco	Fantasy	Wii	Action RPG		
2009 (JP)	Tales of the World: Radiant Mythology 2	Alfa System	Namco	Fantasy	PSP	Action RPG		
2009 (JP/NA)	Witch's Tale, A	Hit Maker	Nippon Ichi	Fantasy	DS	Action RPG		
2008 (NA)	Avernum 5	Spiderweb	Spiderweb	Fantasy	MAC, WIN		Sequel to Avernum 4.	
2008 (NA)	Aveyond	Amaranth	Amaranth	Fantasy	WIN (Rerel)		Rerelease on GameTap.	
2008 (INT)	Depths of Peril	Soldak	Soldak	Fantasy	OSX (Port)	Action RPG	Port of Depths of Peril for WIN.	
2008 (DE); 2009 (NA/EU)	Drakensang: The Dark Eye; Das Schwarze Auge: Drakensang	Radon	dtp (DE); THQ (NA); Eidos (EU)	Fantasy	WIN		Sequel to Realms of Arkania: Shadows over Riva	
2008 (NA/EU)	Fable: The Lost Chapters	Lionhead	Microsoft	Fantasy	OSX (Port)		Port of Fable: The Lost Chapters for Xbox.	
2008 (NA)	Fallout	Interplay	Interplay	Post-apocalyptic	WIN (Rerel)		Rerelease on GameTap.	
2008 (NA)	Fallout 2	Interplay	Interplay	Post-apocalyptic	WIN (Rerel)		Rerelease on GameTap.	
2008 (NA)	Fate: Undiscovered Realms	WildTangent	WildTangent; Encore	Fantasy	WIN	Action RPG	Sequel to Fate.	
2008 (??)	King's Bounty: The Legend	Katauri	1C Company	Fantasy	WIN	Tactical RPG	Spiritual successor to King's Bounty.	
2008 (NA)	Jade Empire: Special Edition	BioWare	BioWare	Fantasy	OSX (Port)	Action RPG	Port of Jade Empire for Xbox.	
2008 (NA)	Jagged Alliance 2: Gold Pack	Sir-Tech	Strategy First	Modern	WIN (Rerel)	Tactical RPG	Rerelease on GamersGate.	
2008 (NA)	Mass Effect	BioWare; Demiurge	EA	Sci-Fi	WIN (Port)		Port of Mass Effect for X360.	
2008 (NA)	Neverwinter Nights 2	Obsidian	Aspyr	Fantasy	OSX (Port)		Port of Neverwinter Nights 2 for WIN. Sequel to Neverwinter Nights.	
2008 (NA)	Neverwinter Nights 2: Gold	Obsidian	Aspyr	Fantasy	WIN (Rerel)		Rerelease of Neverwinter Nights 2 for WIN. Sequel to Neverwinter Nights.	
2008 (NA/EU)	Sacred 2: Fallen Angel	Ascaron		Fantasy	WIN	Action RPG	Sequel to Sacred.	
2008 (??)	Silverfall: Earth Awakening	Kyiv's Games	Monte Cristo	Fantasy	WIN	Action RPG	Expansion to Silverfall.	
2008 (??)	Silverfall: Gold Edition	Kyiv's Games	Monte Cristo	Fantasy	WIN (Comp)	Action RPG	Compilation of Silverfall and its expansion.	
2008 (INT)	Space Rangers 2: Reboot	Elemental	Cinemaware	Sci-Fi	WIN		Expansion to Space Rangers 2: Dominators.	
2008 (NA/EU/AU/UK)	Fallout 3	Bethesda	Bethesda; ZeniMax Media	Post-apocalyptic	WIN	Action RPG	Sequel to Fallout 2.	
2009 (WW)	Dawn of Magic 2	SkyFallen Entertainment	RU: 1C Company; EU: Kalypso Media; NA: Take-Two Interactive	Fantasy	WIN	Action RPG	Sequel to Dawn of Magic	RU
2009 (JP/NA); 2010 (EU)	Demon's Souls	FromSoftware	JP: Sony Computer Entertainment; NA: Atlus USA; EU: Namco Bandai Partners	Fantasy	PS3	Action RPG	Spiritual successor to King's Field series	JP
2009 (INT)	Dragon Age: Origins	BioWare	EA	Fantasy	WIN	Action RPG		
2009 (INT)	Final Fantasy Crystal Chronicles: Echoes of Time	Square Enix	Square Enix	Fantasy	DS, WII	Action RPG	Sequel to Final Fantasy Crystal Chronicles: Ring of Fates	JP
2009 (INT)	Fragile Dreams: Farewell Ruins of the Moon	Namco; Tri-Crescendo	JP: Namco Bandai Games; NA: Xseed Games; PAL: Rising Star Games	Post-apocalyptic	WII	Action RPG		JP
2009 (RU)	Konung III: Ties of the Dynasty	1C		Fantasy	WIN			RU
2009 (INT)	Last Remnant, The	Square Enix PDD2	Square Enix	Fantasy	WIN	JRPG		
2009 (EU)	Risen	Piranha Bytes	Deep Silver	Fantasy	WIN	Action RPG		DE
2009 (INT)	Sacred	Ascaron	Linux Game Publishing	Fantasy	LIN (Port)	Action RPG	Port of Sacred.	DE
