= Index of Windows games (Q) =

This is an index of Microsoft Windows games.

This list has been split into multiple pages. Please use the Table of Contents to browse it.

Title	Released	Developer	Publisher
Qin: Tomb of the Middle Kingdom	1997	Learn Technologies Interactive	Time Warner Electronic Publishing, Attica
Quake	1996	id Software	GT Interactive
Quake II	1997	id Software	Activision
Quake III Arena	1999	id Software	Activision
Quake 4	2005	Raven Software	Activision
Quantum Break	2016	Remedy Entertainment	Microsoft Studios
Quantum Conundrum	2012	Airtight Games	Square Enix
The Quarry	2022	Supermassive Games	2K
Queen: The eYe	1998	Destination Design	Electronic Arts
Queen's Wish: The Conqueror	2019	Spiderweb Software	Spiderweb Software
Quest for Glory V: Dragon Fire	1998	Sierra Entertainment	Sierra Entertainment
Quest for the Code	2002	Starbright	Starbright
The Quest	2016	Redshift	Redshift
A Quiet Place: The Road Ahead	2024	Stormind Games	Saber Interactive
The Quivering	1998	Charybdis	Alternative Software
