= Index of DOS games (Q) =

This is an index of DOS games.

This list has been split into multiple pages. Please use the Table of Contents to browse it.

Title	Released	Developer(s)	Publisher(s)
Qin: Tomb of the Middle Kingdom	1995	Learn Technologies Interactive	Time Warner Electronic Publishing, SouthPeak Games
Qix	1989	Alien Technology Group	Taito
Quadrel	1991	Loriciels	Loriciels
Quake	1996	id Software	id Software
Quarantine	1994	Imagexcel	GameTek
Quarantine II: Road Warrior	1995	GameTek	Mindscape
Quarky & Quaysoo's Turbo Science	1992	Jeff Tunnell Productions	Sierra On-Line
Quarterback Attack with Mike Ditka	1995	Digital Pictures	Digital Pictures
Queen: The eYe	1998	Destination Design	Electronic Arts
Quest for Glory I: So You Want To Be A Hero	1989, 1992	Sierra On-Line	Sierra On-Line
Quest for Glory II: Trial by Fire	1990	Sierra On-Line	Sierra On-Line
Quest for Glory III: Wages of War	1992	Sierra On-Line	Sierra On-Line
Quest for Glory IV: Shadows of Darkness	1993	Sierra On-Line	Sierra On-Line
Questprobe featuring Spider-Man	1985	Adventure International	Load'N'Go Software
Questprobe featuring The Hulk	1984	Adventure International	Load'N'Go Software
Questprobe featuring The Human Torch and The Thing	1985	Adventure International	Load'N'Go Software
Questron II	1988	Westwood Studios	Strategic Simulations
Quiver	1997	ADvertainment Software	ESD Games
Quivering, The	1998	Charybdis	Alternative Software
