= SpeedTree =

Group of vegetation programming and modeling software products

- Developers: Unity Technologies; Interactive Data Visualization, Inc. (IDV)
- Stable release: SpeedTree for Games v9.0.1 (February 2, 2022) SpeedTree Cinema v9.1.3 (SpeedTree Studio v7 and SpeedTree Architect 7 were launched November 13, 2013, and discontinued upon the release of SpeedTree Cinema 8) SpeedTree 8.4.2 for Unreal Engine 4 (November 10, 2019) SpeedTree 8.4.2 for Unity (November 10, 2019) SpeedTree 8.4.2 for Amazon Lumberyard (November 10, 2019)
- Operating system: Windows, Xbox One, Xbox 360, PlayStation 4, PlayStation 3, PlayStation Vita, Mac OS X, Linux
- Type: Game Middleware and Animation
- Website: SpeedTree Official Website; SpeedTree YouTube

SpeedTree is a group of vegetation programming and modeling software products developed and sold by Unity Technologies, and originally by Interactive Data Visualization, Inc. (IDV), that generates virtual foliage for animations, architecture and in real time for video games and demanding real time simulations.

SpeedTree has been licensed to developers of a range of video games for Microsoft Windows, and the Xbox and PlayStation console series since 2002.

SpeedTree Cinema has been used in more than 40 major films since its release in 2009, including Iron Man 3, Star Trek Into Darkness, Life of Pi and Birdman, and was used to generate the lush vegetation of Pandora, in Avatar.

SpeedTree was awarded a Scientific and Technical Academy Award in 2015, presented to IDV founders Michael Sechrest and Chris King, and Senior Engineer Greg Croft.

== History ==
SpeedTree was conceptualized at IDV in circa 2000, and originated due to the firm's lack of satisfaction with 3rd-party tree-generation software on the market.

The initial version of SpeedTreeCAD (CAD standing for "computer-aided design") was developed by IDV for a real-time golf simulation. Although backers pulled out of the golf project, IDV refined the CAD software as a 3D Studio Max plug-in for am animated architectural rendering, dubbing it SpeedTreeMAX.

SpeedTreeMAX was released in February 2002, and toward the end of 2002, IDV released SpeedTreeRT, a real-time foliage/tree middleware SDK, which allowed automatic levels of foliage detail, real-time wind effects, and multiple lighting options. IDV eventually released plug-ins for Maya as well, appropriately named SpeedTreeMAYA. In early 2011, IDV discontinued the SpeedTreeMAX and SpeedTreeMAYA plugins, replacing them with SpeedTree Modeler and Compiler products.

IDV released SpeedTree 5 in July 2009, a version representing a "complete re-engineering" of the software and the first versions of SpeedTree enabling hand modeling and editing of vegetation models: SpeedTree Modeler (replacing SpeedTreeCAD), SpeedTreeSDK (replacing SpeedTreeRT) and SpeedTree Compiler, which prepares SpeedTree files for real-time rendering.

SpeedTree Cinema was first released by IDV in 2009, based on version 5 technology. SpeedTree for Games (version 6) was released on November 7, 2011, and was essentially a re-branded version of SpeedTree 6 (Modeler + Compiler). The product was identified as SpeedTree for Games to distinguish it from other products not meant for gaming/real-time use.

SpeedTree Architect was released on October 15, 2012, and is designed for architectural 3D CAD use and 3D fly-throughs. IDV released updated versions of SpeedTree Cinema, SpeedTree Studio and SpeedTree Architect in November 2013. IDV released SpeedTree v7 for Unreal Engine 4 in July 2014. IDV released SpeedTree v7 for Unity 5 on the new engine version's launch date, in March 2015. IDV released SpeedTree for Games v7 on April 16, 2015.

IDV and three of its engineers received a Scientific and Technical Academy Award in 2015, for their SpeedTree Cinema product suite.

IDV was acquired by Unity Technologies in July 2021.

SpeedTree 9 was released on January 10, 2022. This version added new features such as freehand editing for branch bending. New branch features, zig-zag, jink, texture map skew correction can be found on the branch generator. Mesh Converter to help turn 3d trunk and branch scans into full tree models. Atlas control, HDRI lighting, USD export, material for backside of the leaf geometry

== Products ==
=== Suites ===
- SpeedTree Cinema was released by IDV in 2009, and saw its first major use in Avatar by James Cameron. SpeedTree Cinema is designed for use in the film industry, and generates high-resolution meshes and high-quality textures for Autodesk 3ds Max, Autodesk Maya and Cinema4D. The Cinema edition includes SpeedTree Modeler, and the complete Tree Model Library designed by IDV, while with some other suites tree packs must be purchased separately. Several members of the SpeedTree line can simulate animated growth of trees and plants and seasonal changes, and can export data for animated wind effects.
- SpeedTree Studio was released by IDV in 2009 as a less expensive companion to SpeedTree Cinema. It does not include all Cinema features, nor the complete Tree Model Library.
- SpeedTree Architect was released in 2012, is designed for use in 3D architectural CAD. It generates meshes compatible with typical architectural applications such as Autodesk 3ds Max, Autodesk Maya and Rhino. The Architect edition also exports normal maps and UV maps, for physically-accurate rendering engines such as V-Ray and mental ray.
- SpeedTree for Games is the edition of SpeedTree for video game development, contrasting with the Subscription edition offered to users of the Unity game development engine and certain versions of the Unreal Engine 4 engine. The Games edition includes the Modeler, Compiler, and SDK. This edition permits game developers to integrate SpeedTree runtime technology into any game engine of their choice. Meshes generated with the system are low poly, with multiple levels of detail, use texture atlases, and are typically stored in an efficient binary format.
- SpeedTree Subscription Edition is a low-cost edition of SpeedTree Modeler and Runtime, targeted at independent game studios. The licensing fee is a US$19 monthly charge, as well as additional charges for tree packs. Subscribers get access to the SpeedTree editor, the ability to generate 3D models of trees and plants, such plants being exclusively usable with either Unreal Engine 4 or Unity, depending on the license. Subscribers can download additional tree model packs from the Model Library, and pricing varies between packs.

=== Components ===
- SpeedTree Modeler is a Windows-based specialized modeling tool for designing foliage. The modeler features a combination of procedural tree generation, and hand-editing tools, to draw trees or transform individual tree parts. Procedural tree generation uses configuration such as branch length, branching angles and bark texture to generate a tree in a variety of formats. Newer versions support a drag-and-drop interface that automatically blends branch intersections and handles branch collisions.
- SpeedTree Compiler is a software that enables creation of efficient tree models for use in real-time rendering or video games. It generates texture atlases and compiles and optimizes tree models for real-time use.
- SpeedTree SDK is a multi-platform C++ SDK that efficiently handles rendering of SpeedTree-generated trees and forests. The engine is designed to integrate and operate within a larger game engine, with ready-made support for Unreal Engine, Unity and OGRE. The engine contains optimized systems to cull off-screen trees, and to determine level of detail for on-screen trees. Full source code is available to licensees for use in video games and other real-time applications, and modification of the engine is supported. The engine is built to work with Microsoft Windows, Mac OS X, Xbox, PlayStation and PlayStation Vita.

== Partners ==
IDV is a licensed middleware partner with PlayStation 3, PlayStation 4, Xbox 360 and Xbox One.

IDV has partnered with Epic Games in order to integrate the software with Epic's Unreal Engine 4 and Unreal Engine 3 and the free UDK engine released in November 2009. Partnerships have also been formed between IDV and BigWorld Tech, the Vision Engine by Havok, Multiverse Network, the Gamebryo engine by Emergent Game Technologies and the OGRE open-source rendering engine by Torus Knot.

== Awards ==
- SpeedTree won a Scientific and Technical Academy Award in 2015.
- SpeedTree was accorded a Primetime Emmy Engineering Award in October 2015.

== Applications ==
=== Video game industry ===
SpeedTree for Games was licensed for its first video games, including The Elder Scrolls IV: Oblivion, in December 2002. SpeedTree has been licensed for PC and next-generation console titles in a wide variety of genres. Studios that have used SpeedTree, or published games featuring the technology, include:

- Bungie

Selected recent, upcoming and/or popular titles featuring SpeedTree for Games:

Title	Year	Developer
Battlefield 4	2013	EA Digital Illusions CE
Destiny	2014	Bungie
Digital Combat Simulator	2017	Eagle Dynamics
Hawken	2012	Adhesive Games
Space Engineers 2	2025	Keen Software House
Warriors Orochi 3	2011	Tecmo Koei

=== Real-time applications ===
SpeedTree is being used in the following real-time projects and offerings:

- An optional foliage module with the Vega Prime visualization product line. Vega Prime is a 3D visual simulation software package used by the global military industry and in other game and non-game markets.
- A combat simulation developed by Emergent Game Technologies for the US Department of Defense
- A project under development by the Germany-based division of European Aeronautic Defence and Space (EADS)

== See also ==
- Game engine
