= Realmz =

1994 video game

- Developer: Fantasoft
- Publisher: Fantasoft
- Designer: Tim Phillips
- Platforms: Macintosh, Windows
- Release: 1994-2002
- Genre: Role-playing video game
- Mode: Single player

Realmz is a fantasy adventure and role-playing video game first developed and published by Fantasoft in 1994 for the Apple Macintosh as shareware. Fantasoft released a Microsoft Windows-compatible version in 1999, and a science fiction role-playing game based on the Realmz engine, titled New Centurions, in 2001. Realmz was originally written by Tim Phillips on a Macintosh IIsi; he also wrote four game scenarios, including the introductory scenario "City of Bywater". Other original scenario contributors were Jim Foley (who wrote two scenarios, namely "Castle in the Clouds" and "White Dragon") and Sean Sayrs (who wrote three, including "Prelude to Pestilence" and "Griloch's Revenge").

Realmz is similar to the Exile series by Spiderweb Software which features similar gameplay and graphics, and both were originally published by Fantasoft.

Custom Realmz game scenarios can be created with a tool called Divinity - also produced by Fantasoft, LLC. A special version of Realmz - Divine Right - is useful in conjunction with Divinity. It is the debugger software for user-created scenarios.

== Setting ==
While Realmz is primarily an engine for playing a number of scenarios (roughly corresponding to the campaigns in a tabletop RPG) using the same characters and set of rules, the different scenarios tend to take place in a broadly similar high fantasy setting known as "The Realmz". In fact, Fantasoft was once contacted by TSR about similarities to the Forgotten Realms D&D module, forcing the alteration of a number of elements in Realmz and its scenarios.

== Gameplay ==
Realmz game-play screenshot.

Realmz game-play screenshot.

Realmz is a Role-playing video game where the player assumes the roles of a party of heroes in fictional adventures. The turn-based, tile-based game has rules for individual combat and the use of magic spells in fighting while focusing on the medieval-period high fantasy genre.

The user interface consists of a character status bar which includes the character's portrait, name, combat status, current stamina/maximum stamina, attacks/round or spell points/max spell points, and armor rating.

Players can select from a range of different actions including camping, inventory management, spellcasting, displaying current spells affecting the party, using spells from a scrollcase, trading items between characters, exchanging money between characters, resting, and inscribing spells to scrolls. The action panel also displays the current time and day in-game and the current source of light. Special actions include area search, entering a temple, shopping and attempting to perform a special action.

Combat gameplay involves the basic movement of characters around the combat screen which costs movement points. The number of movement points are affected by how much weight the character is carrying. Each character has a maximum movement allowance that is determined by their statistics. A character will always have at least 2 movement points per round, even if that character is carrying the maximum load. Rougher terrain takes longer to cross and can affect combat gameplay. Open areas cost 1 movement point to cross while obstacles and muddy or rocky areas cost more movement points.

Some objects, such as trees or giant fungi, are solid barriers to small creatures, while larger creatures are able to step over or move through these objects. Characters can also swap positions with other characters (since version 5), or they can attack a friend. Characters on auto mode or those that are reanimated will never attack an ally and will always try to swap positions.

Magic-using characters use spell points to cast spells, regenerating spell points slowly over time or more rapidly while resting. Spells are gained only at level-up by "purchasing" them using spell selection points, which the character receives a set number of based on their stats (although priestly classes instead gained entire levels of spells at a time with every three level-ups in earlier versions of Realmz). When encamped, the party's magic users can store away pre-cast spells for the future by using parchment, a scroll case, and an additional spell point penalty to create scrolls; these scrolls could then be used in the future (even by compatible proto-magical classes like thieves and paladins) without spending spell points.

One unusual feature of the Realmz magic system is that most spells could have their power (damage, area, targets, duration, etc.) scaled by two to seven times in return for increased cost.

== Scenarios ==
Divinity scenario development kit screenshot.

While new scenarios were released throughout the game's history, also typically packed along with the game in the next Realmz release, the game ultimately ended up with 13 official scenarios:

- City Of Bywater (developed alongside Realmz by Tim Phillips)
- Prelude To Pestilence (1995, Sean Sayrs)
- Assault On Giant Mountain (1995, Tim Phillips)
- Castle in The Clouds (1995, Jim Foley)
- Destroy The Necronomicon (1995, Tim Phillips)
- White Dragon (1996, Jim Foley)
- Grilochs Revenge (1997, Sean Sayrs)
- Twin Sands of Time (1999, Sean Sayrs)
- Trouble in the Sword Lands (1999, Pierre H. Vachon)
- Mithril Vault (1999, Tim Phillips)
- Half Truth (2000, Nicholas T. Tyacke)
- War in the Sword Lands (2000, Pierre H. Vachon)
- Wrath of the Mind Lords (2002, Pierre H. Vachon)

Many third party scenarios have been developed by fans and game developers by using Divinity, a scenario development kit (SDK) for Realmz that was released years into the lifespan of Realmz. This allowed players who have no knowledge of programming to create scenarios with their own monsters, items, graphics and storyline.

== Character editor ==
Realmz Character Editor screenshot.

A character editor program was created and could be purchased separately from Realmz. The editor enables players to change existing characters and generate new characters with their own skills, portraits and other settings such as strength. However, not every aspect of a character can be edited. The fact sheet for characters are displayed on the screen, and is similar to the fact sheet in the Realmz game. An edit bar at the top of the screen allow players to edit a character's spells, conditions, and abilities. Characters can be given any items, however they are still subject to the restrictions of that item; as an example a Priest is still only be able to use blunt weapons.

== Future of Realmz ==
Tim Phillips is no longer developing Realmz, and the game has not been updated in several years. It can only be run natively under the classic Mac OS from System 7 to Mac OS 9 or Windows 98, Windows XP and Windows 7. Bugs on the Windows version exist, and it is not up to version parity with the final Macintosh release. Users have been able to run Realmz through the Classic environment, or using emulation software such as Basilisk II or SheepShaver.

== Free Realmz ==
Realmz was originally released as shareware, with a $20 registration fee and additional fees for each scenario. As of November 2008, Fantasoft has released the full version of Realmz as a free download. The registration numbers for the scenarios have been made available to everyone on the Realmz Yahoo Group. Users were instructed to enter 410 on the registration screen and type in the serial number 13706024 then use the serial and registration code from Fantasoft.

== Reviews ==
Realmz received positive reviews from magazines and websites in the Macintosh community shortly after its initial release. Some of the more notable reviews are from MacUser, MacCentral and CNET. Many users were pleased with the game's good customer support, "intuitive user interface" and the continuous release of improved versions. Realmz was awarded the Golden Mouse for best shareware adventure game in the Swedish edition of MacWorld.

Inside Mac Games rated Realmz four out of five, calling it "one of the finest shareware games" and "easily in the same class as commercial games". Inside Mac Games praised the quality of the game's documentation and the point-and-click interface, which presents all information and actions accessibly. Although not a fan of role-playing games, a Macworld reviewer recommended Realmz to fans of role-playing games: "those who like this sort of thing swear that Realmz is The Goods." The 1995 MacUser Shareware Awards named Realmz the best shareware product of the year in the Fun and Games category. In a 1996 review, MacAddict recommended Realmz as "a wonderful shareware role playing game." MacAddict reviewed the game favorably again in 2000, saying that it made up for its graphical shortcomings with its depth of gameplay.

The Macintosh Bible said the game offered "a few years worth of adventuring"; in spite of its somewhat dated artwork and interface, the game had a "humble charm [...] complemented by many maps, weapons, spells and monsters." Black Art of Macintosh Game Programming selected Realmz as one of the best Macintosh shareware games, noting that it was "based on the concept of expandability; you can add additional scenarios to the game simply by dropping them into a folder."

== Notes ==
1. Flabio's Place - Realmz Scenario downloads and Flabio's Place - Divinity
2. Realmz Wiki
3. Realmz registration numbers
