= Nethergate =

1998 video game

- Opening screen
- Developer: Spiderweb Software
- Publisher: Spiderweb Software
- Designer: Jeff Vogel
- Platforms: Mac OS, Microsoft Windows
- Release: Original; Mac OS, Microsoft Windows; 1998; Remake; Mac OS: NA: May 21, 2007; Microsoft Windows: NA: August 9, 2007
- Genre: Role-playing
- Mode: Single-player

Nethergate is a computer-based historical fantasy role-playing game published by Spiderweb Software for the Macintosh and Microsoft Windows platforms. The game was released in 1998 by Jeff Vogel, and was Spiderweb Software's first game to feature a 45° isometric viewing angle. Nethergate offers players the choice to play on either side of the story, as Celts or Romans. The game's plot allows for several endings and many side quests, which accompany the main story. Spiderweb Software released a remake called Nethergate Resurrection in May 2007.

== Plot ==
The player begins with a party of four characters, who are either "A small band of Roman Soldiers sent to the Shadowvale to complete a mysterious mission", or a "Band of Celtic warriors told by your chief to go to the village of Nethergate for mysterious reasons". Shadowvale is an isolated valley controlled by the Brigantes, and the game's events take place during the time of Boudica's rebellion in AD 60/61. The linear missions of the Romans and the Celts complement each other to a certain extent. The Romans are first faced with retrieving a satchel with vital information for Shadow Valley Fort from a nearby mine infested with Goblins, while the Celts' first mission is to acquire a bronze token from a nearby pit in which Goblins have made their fortification. From there, both sides make their way to the house of the Three Crones, who are very similar to the Three Fates of Greek mythology. The Crones aid the player if they have a Roman party and give tasks to accomplish, but imprison them if the player has a Celtic party.

The next location is a ruined Faerie hall, in which the party acquires a contract between the Sidhe and the village of Nethergate, explaining that the party must retrieve three magical items: a Fomorian's Stone Skull, The Eye of Cathrac, and the Crown of Annwn. Once these items have been acquired, the party journeys to the Spire of Ages, where the Celts aid the Faerie leader in escaping this world, while the Romans attempt to interrupt him. In the "best" ending for both sides, Shadow Valley Fort is destroyed, the village of Nethergate is evacuated, and the enchanted weapons meant for the Celts are destroyed.

== Gameplay ==
Nethergate's gameplay uses an isometric view, and is somewhat intermediate between that of Blades of Exile and Avernum, as it combines the pseudo-3D of Avernum with a battle and conversation system resembling Blades of Exile. Romans and Celts have unique traits for their statistics. Romans have better armour and weapons than Celts, but Celts have better magic, potion-making, and general skills for the wilderness.

Nethergate is unique among Spiderweb Software games in being the only game to use a spell system consisting of Spell Circles, instead of the "Mage" and "Priest" spell system featured in the Blades of Exile and Avernum series. Certain Circles have skill restrictions on them based on the character's level of Druidism, skill in other circles, and Faction. These are:

- Health Circle – available to Celts and Romans; can only be as high as Druidism skill; contains spells used for healing and curing characters
- War Circle – available to Celts and Romans; can only be as high as Druidism skill; contains spells used for shielding and boosting the player's characters, as well as causing harm to enemies
- Beast Circle – available to Celts at the start of the game, but Romans must earn it by completing a quest; may only be as high as War Circle skill for Celts, with a fixed value for Romans; contains spells for summoning creatures
- Craft Circle – available to Celts at the start of the game, but Romans must earn it by completing a quest; may only be as high as the War Circle skill for Celts, with a fixed value for Romans; contains spells for aiding in travel around the game
- Spirit Circle – available to Celts at the start of the game, but Romans must find it; may only be as high as the lower of Craft or Beast Circle as Celts, with a fixed value for Romans; contains spells for damaging magical creatures and blocks
- Nether Circle – a grouping of five spells which may only be used by the Celts; also the most powerful and hard-to-find spells.

== Reception ==
Nethergate was reviewed in 2000 in Dragon #273 in the "Silicon Sorcery" column. The review said that while Nethergate lacks the "bells and whistles" of bigger releases, it offers both "a fascinating little romp through a mythic era of history" rarely explored in role-playing games, and "terrific price-to-performance ratio", with a single playthrough lasting over 50 hours. For Dragon, the game's biggest weakness is mission design that too often revolves around recovering MacGuffins, and its greatest strength is the Celtic influence apparent in the Seelie Court, the Wicker Man, and the Wild Hunt.

Nethergate

Review score
Publication	Score	
Publication	Macintosh	PC
AllGame	4.5/5	3/5

Nethergate: Resurrection

Review score
Publication	Score	
Publication	Macintosh	PC
AllGame	3/5	3/5

The editors of Computer Games Strategy Plus nominated Nethergate for their 1999 "Role-Playing Game of the Year" award, which ultimately went to Planescape: Torment. They wrote of Nethergate: "Take an old-fashioned role-playing game and add a full-blown editor and voila, instant gameplay. And it gives you more gameplay for your gaming dollar than most commercial games".

Inside Mac Games rated Nethergate 3 out of 5. The review praised the game's high quality plot and "rich sense of history" but criticized the crude graphics, combat and character advancement mechanics, and interface.

== Nethergate: Resurrection ==
A revamped version of Nethergate titled Nethergate: Resurrection was released for Macintosh on May 21, 2007, with the Windows version released on August 9. Changes to the game include:

- Use of the Blades of Avernum game engine, which also provides a quest log, a nicer automap, and improved graphical features.
- Two new dungeons, several new quests, and many new magic items.
- The game is universal on Intel Macintosh and compatible with Windows Vista.

Saved games from Nethergate are not compatible with Nethergate: Resurrection. Customers who had purchased the original game also received a thirteen-dollar discount.
