= LSCM =

LSCM may refer to:

- Laser scanning confocal microscopy
- Least squares conformal map, a technique used in 3D texture mapping
- Library Services and Content Management, a department of the Federal Depository Library Program
- Low Speed Collision Mitigation, a safety mechanism for cars.

LSCM may refer to:

- logistic and Supply chain management
