= Avernum: Escape from the Pit =

2011 video game

- Logo for Avernum: Escape from the Pit
- Developer: Spiderweb Software
- Platforms: Microsoft Windows; Mac OS X; iOS; Android
- Release: NA: December 14, 2011
- Genre: Role-playing video game
- Mode: Single-player

Avernum: Escape from the Pit is a role-playing video game developed by Spiderweb Software. It is the first game in the remade Avernum First Trilogy and the second ground-up rewrite of Exile: Escape from the Pit, released in 1995 (the first rewrite was Avernum, released in 2000). The game was re-released as a graphics and game engine update, and it addressed Avernum incompatibilities with newer versions of Mac OS X 10.7 Lion and newer.

The game was released for Mac OS X on December 14, 2011, and in April 2012 for Microsoft Windows and the iPad.

== Plot ==
The Avernum series is based in Avernum, a subterranean nation far under the surface of the world. The surface is ruled by the Empire, a single, monolithic power under the command of the cruel Emperor Hawthorne. Everyone on the surface who speaks out, rebels, or doesn't fit in is sentenced to life imprisonment in Avernum. Prisoners are expected to die, the victim of starvation, horrible monsters, or simple despair. The Avernum series tells the tale of the Avernites' struggle to survive, avenge themselves upon the Empire, and win both freedom and a return to the surface world.

== Gameplay ==
Screenshot

Avernum: Escape from the Pit is a single-player role-playing video game. The player controls a group of up to four adventurers, who can use melee weapons, missile weapons, magic, or a mix of these skills to defeat opponents. The game system in Avernum is skill based. Characters choose a character class at the beginning of the game, but this only determines the character's starting skills. The player is then free to train the character in different skills. Avernum features a large, open world. Game quests can be completed in almost any order. The combat is turn-based with an isometric perspective, where creatures in battle take turns acting, during which they can move, use abilities, and attack.

== Reception ==
Reception

Aggregate score
Aggregator	Score
Metacritic	iOS: 81/100; PC: 76/100

Review scores
Publication	Score
Gamezebo	4/5
RPGamer	3.5/5
RPGFan	70/100
TouchArcade	4.5/5
Digitally Downloaded	4.5/5

Rock Paper Shotgun criticized the user interface but said it was overcome by "great writing, a simple and effective turn-based combat system, and a great sense of freedom and exploration". They later listed it as one of the best role-playing games available for PCs. Gamezebo praised its gameplay, character customization, and exploration, but they said modern gamers may be put off by the quest design, user interface, and barebones graphics. RPGamer praised the exploration, fun battles, and character customization, but they criticized the graphics, sound, and game balance. Slide to Play wrote that the game "is old-school, and we mean that in a good way". TouchArcade wrote, "The storytelling, customization, and sheer amount of content make this RPG a true powerhouse on iOS." RPGFan recommend Avadon: The Black Fortress instead but said that players who enjoyed the previous Spiderweb games would enjoy this one, too. Digitally Downloaded called it "a superb iPad port of one of Spiderweb's very finest moments".
