= Geneforge 2 =

2003 video game

- Developer: Spiderweb Software
- Publisher: Spiderweb Software
- Designer: Jeff Vogel
- Programmer: Jeff Vogel
- Artist: Andrew Hunter
- Series: Geneforge
- Platforms: Mac OS X, Microsoft Windows
- Release: Mac OS X: NA: July 25, 2003; Microsoft Windows: NA: October 19, 2003 (Online); NA: November 3, 2011 (Steam)
- Genre: Role-playing
- Mode: Single-player

Geneforge 2 is the second video game in the Geneforge series of role-playing video games created by Spiderweb Software.

Players create a character from one of three character classes and explore the game's 84 locations, deciding whether to ally themselves with one of the four factions or remain neutral. The game's plot concerns an apprentice Shaper and an Agent (whose name is Shanti), both members of a secretive sect of wizards who can create life by using their own life energy. They are sent on a mission to investigate a failing Shaper colony called Drypeak. When they arrive not all is well, the player becomes drawn into a four-way war which has been hidden from the outside world.

The game's development was made more simple by the use of the same game engine to that of its predecessor, though extra dialogue was involved due to the presence of four factions rather than the three in Geneforge. Video game journalists awarded both positive and average review scores, they were impressed by Geneforge 2's plot and replayability but criticized the game's graphics and ambient sound effects.

== Gameplay ==
Geneforge 2 is a role-playing game where the player's choice of answers during conversations with non-player characters affects how the player is regarded amongst the game's four factions. The player character is an apprentice Shaper, a feared and secretive group who can create life. Players create a character from one of three character classes and explore the area surrounding Drypeak, a failing Shaper colony, solving quests and gaining experience. Each of the three character classes has a particular playing style and can approach tasks in different ways. Guardians are fighters who excel in standard combat skills, especially hand-to-hand fighting. They are capable of shaping creations, but have little affinity for magic. Agents are the game's version of rogues, and excel in spell casting and are capable of hand-to-hand combat. The Shaper is a summoner, capable of creating living creatures by using their own life essence. Shapers rely on their creations for protection. Players can also convince certain non-player characters to join them.

The game is played in 45° axonometric perspective, movement through the game's environs is real-time, combat is turn-based. The game world is divided into 84 areas accessible through a world map. Clearing areas by defeating leaders or successfully traversing the terrain allows players to bypass those areas via the world map, reducing travelling time. The game uses an auto-map, each area is completely darkened and is revealed as the player explores, similar to the fog of war used in real-time strategy games. As the player completes tasks and defeats enemies they receive experience, leading to increased levels and additional skill points. The player character's skill points can be used to increase their statistics. Canisters which increase skills or add new abilities are scattered throughout the game. Geneforge 2 offers a number of changes and additions over its predecessor. Three new creations are available to players: massive Drakons; telepathic Gazers; and acidic, decaying Rotghroths. Several new spells are available, such as Kill and Aura of Flames. The skill "Anatomy", which allowed the player to cause extra damage in melee combat, is replaced with "Parry", which has a chance of blocking incoming attacks. Also the spell "Dominate" which allows the player to take control of one of the enemies is replaced with "Wrack". The game engine itself, however, is essentially unchanged from the original Geneforge.

== Plot ==
An apprentice Shaper is sent on a training mission with a Shaper Agent named Shanti by the Shaper Council. The pair are tasked with assessing the failed Shaper colony Drypeak and making contact with the pair of Shapers, Barzahl and Zakary, who were dispatched years ago to revitalize the colony. The gates of Drypeak are found unmanned, much to Shanti's disgust, the Agent and her charge are also attacked by rogue Shaper creations. When the pair gain access to the colony, they find a dishevelled Zakary who informs them that both he and Barzahl were unsuccessful in revitalizing the colony, which remains a barren desert. He also states that Barzahl has died. Zakary and the population of Drypeak behave suspiciously. Shanti is shadowed by an armed guard against her will. She instructs the apprentice, who is not guarded, to explore Drypeak and beyond in order to discover the truth behind the colony and Barzahl's disappearance.

A Shaper explores a desert area with four creations, 2 "Battle Betas" and 2 "Vlish"

After exploring a number of the game's locations, the apprentice gains access to a guarded tunnel and is astonished to discover what lies on the other side. Whereas the valley where Drypeak is located is a dustbowl devoid of vegetation, the lands on the other side of the tunnel are lush and green, meaning highly illegal shaping is taking place in secret. Serviles, the Shapers' slaves created from life essence, show abnormal intelligence and self-awareness. While still reeling from the revelation of what lies beyond Drypeak, the Shaper apprentice discovers that Shanti has disappeared during one of her escapes from her armed escorts, her necklace lay broken on the grass outside the tunnel. At this point, approximately a quarter of the way through the game, the player's choices expand considerably.

When confronted with the apprentice's findings, Zakary confesses to being part of a plot to conceal illegal experiments from the Shaper Council. Both he and Barzahl were sent to Sucia Island, the location where the original Geneforge game is set, where Barred Shaper technology had allowed Shapers to manipulate life in countless ways. Instead of destroying the Geneforge, the pair agreed to spirit away the technology and experiment in private. Several of the intelligent serviles who lived on Sucia were brought along; a number of Shapers also followed Barzahl. Zakary remained in Drypeak to provide a front for the experimentation and rogue serviles which lay beyond the tunnel. Barzahl moved further into the valleys to build settlements and run experiments. Repeated use of the canisters can render the user cold, detached and possibly mad. When Zakary saw this happening to Barzahl the pair argued, Zakary regretted his part in the deceit. This occurred a year before the arrival of Shanti and the apprentice, Zakary had lost contact with Barzahl since the argument. Zakary pledges his loyalty to the Shaper Council once more and asks for help from the apprentice in dealing with what lies beyond the guarded cave.

Using the Geneforge to empower himself and his followers, the Barzites, Barzahl intends to bestow god-like abilities on himself and his followers within the city of Rising. Barzahl cut off contact with Drypeak, preparing to repel the inevitable assault of the Shaper Council, who they wish to remain independent from. The Takers, a faction of intelligent serviles who had originated on Sucia Island, were given powers by Barzahl because they worked for him. In turn the Takers created powerful dragon-like beasts called drakons, taught the drakons how to create life themselves, and betrayed Barzahl. The Takers stand for the total destruction of the Shaper Council. The Awakened, the other servile faction in Geneforge 2, believe that Shapers should treat them as equals. They had been working with the Barzites, but the Awakened's leader Learned Pinner rejected the Barzites' view that serviles need to be controlled. Trade and communications between Zakary's now Shaper Council loyalist Drypeak and the other three factions have ceased, replaced with spies and subterfuge. The player is free to decide which faction they wish to join, if any, and to explore the game world, reacting to the characters and situations they encounter.

== Development ==
Geneforge 2 was developed in tandem with another Spiderweb Software title, Blades of Avernum. Developer Jeff Vogel described the game's production as "very relaxing", since the game engine was already completed from the previous game he was familiar with it and therefore could devote his time to creating the game itself. Due to the different reactions the player receives from the factions, depending on their actions and conversation choices, it required days to complete a single town. This was further increased from the original game, due to there being four factions instead of three. In an interview held during the development of Geneforge 2 Vogel said "I'm really excited about the Geneforge series. And we're already thinking about Geneforge 3". A 20 area demo version was released, allowing players access to towns, mines and woodlands.

== Reception ==
Reception

Review scores
Publication	Score	
Publication	Macintosh	PC
AllGame	3.5/5	4/5
GameSpy	N/A	85%
PC Gamer	N/A	80%
Computer Games Magazine	N/A	80%
CNET	N/A	3 out of 5
Inside Mac Games	6.75 out of 10	N/A

Geneforge 2 received both positive and average review scores. Video game magazine PC Gamer's reviewer stated that "graphics aside, Geneforge 2 is a terrific game" for players new to the RPG genre. The reviewer of Computer Games Magazine praised the Spiderweb Software's titles and said that Geneforge 2 "is probably the best twenty-five bucks an RPG fiend can spend". CNET's staff member was more critical, describing the game as "complex enough to keep you interested, but not quite good enough to enjoy". Indie gaming website Game Tunnel's Gianfranco Berardi praised Geneforge 2 as "an RPG of amazing quality". Inside Mac Games' Ken Newquist stated the game is "a real find" for players who have been disappointed by lack of gameplay in expensive mainstream titles.

The game's graphics and sound effects received a largely negative response, Matt Peckham of GameSpy described them as "yesteryear" and "minimalist" respectively. Ken Newquist called the graphics "far from spectacular" and stated they were worse than older titles such as Baldur's Gate. He also highlighted that enchanted items look identical to their mundane counterparts and that highly evolved creatures are identical to their standard brethren. Newquist also disliked the ambient sounds, which make up the game's soundtrack, calling them "numerous, but repetitive". Gianfranco Berardi was more positive. He stated that "the graphics aren't exactly top-notch", but noted variation between different areas. He also said "the sound effects and ambience simply added to the involving storyline". CNET's editor described the sound effects as "merely adequate" and the graphics "less so".

Gianfranco Berardi praised the plot, saying that it "isn't just good background noise like in most games". He added that he found the plot involving, and that it can cause the player to stop and think about their actions. Matt Peckham described the plot as "fantastic and original", and praised the game's replayability. Ken Newquist compared the game's setting to the pen and paper role-playing game Gamma World, and stated "players get a huge world to explore and—thanks to the intricacies of the game's plot—re-explore".
