= Mesh parameterization =

Given two surfaces with the same topology, a bijective mapping between them exists. On triangular mesh surfaces, the problem of computing this mapping is called mesh parameterization. The parameter domain is the surface that the mesh is mapped onto.

Parameterization was mainly used for mapping textures to surfaces. Recently, it has become a powerful tool for many applications in mesh processing. Various techniques are developed for different types of parameter domains with different parameterization properties.

== Applications ==
- Texture mapping
- Normal mapping
- Detail transfer
- Morphing
- Mesh completion
- Mesh Editing
- Mesh Databases
- Remeshing
- Surface fitting

== Techniques ==
- Barycentric Mappings
- Differential Geometry Primer
- Non-Linear Methods

== Implementations ==
- A fast and simple stretch-minimizing mesh parameterization
- Graphite: ABF++, LSCM, Spectral LSCM
- Linear discrete conformal parameterization
- Discrete Exponential Map
- Boundary First Flattening
- Scalable Locally Injective Mappings
- Triangulated Surface Mesh Parameterization, a chapter of CGAL, the Computational Geometry Algorithms Library

== See also ==
- Parametrization
- Texture atlas
- UV Mapping
