= Fantasoft =

- Industry: Video games
- Founder: Sean Sayrs; Peter Hagen; Tim Phillips
- Website: fantasoft.com

Fantasoft was a computer game company which programmed and promoted a number of shareware games with a primary focus on the Apple Macintosh platform. Fantasoft has been dormant since about 2005. It was founded by Sean Sayrs, Peter Hagen, and Tim Phillips. Fantasoft was created to develop, market, and distribute the shareware game Realmz, which was MacUser Shareware Game of the Year in 1995–96. Following the success of Realmz, Fantasoft created or marketed other Macintosh and Microsoft Windows platform games, most notably Spiderweb Software's early Exile series.

== Development ==
- Realmz
- Final Star (canceled)
- New Centurions

Published:

- Enigma Software:
  - Squish
  - Peregrine (canceled)
- Spiderweb Software
  - Exile: Escape from the Pit
  - Exile II: Crystal Souls
  - Exile III: Ruined World
- Flying Mikros Interactive
  - Monkey Shines
  - Monkey Shines 2: Gorilla Warfare
  - Alien Attack
- Jelly Software:
  - DOWN
- Freemen Software:
  - King of Parking
  - Rain'Net
  - Bugs Bannis
- The Alchemist Guild
  - Lance (canceled)
- Coach Potato Software
  - CommishWare 99

== Notes ==
1. Realmz review, Brian Rumsey, (Low End Mac Gaming), July 11, 2000
2. Rlmz.org Download and Play Realmz by Fantasoft
