= Avadon 3: The Warborn =

2016 video game

- Developer: Spiderweb Software
- Platforms: Microsoft Windows; Mac OS X iOS
- Release: NA: September 14, 2016
- Genre: Role-playing video game
- Mode: Single-player

Avadon 3: The Warborn is a single-player role-playing video game developed by Spiderweb Software. It is the third and final game in the Avadon trilogy. The game was released for Mac OS X and Microsoft Windows in September 2016, A version for the iPad was released in late 2016.

== Setting ==
The Avadon series is set on the fictional continent of Lynaeus, which is divided between two warring factions. There is the Pact, an alliance of five nations, and the Farlands, a loose-knit group of faded empires and barbarian territories. The Pact has banded together for safety and to fend off invasion from the other lands of Lynaeus.

The fortress of Avadon is a force within the Pact, a small army of warriors, spies, and assassins tasked to protect the Pact and eliminate any threats to its safety before they have the chance to grow. The servants of Avadon have great power and are not bound by the laws of the Pact, though this can lead to corruption and abuse.

As Avadon 3 begins, Lynaeus has been invaded. The player must help to repel hordes of monsters and vicious raiders from their homeland. The mad commander has a plan for defeating the invaders and the players must choose whether to help or betray him.

== Gameplay ==
Screenshot of Avadon 3: The Warborn.

Avadon 3: The Warborn is a single-player role-playing video game. The player assumes the role of a Blademaster, a Shadowwalker, a Shaman, a Sorcerer, or a Tinkermage (a new class added in Avadon 2). Later, the player can recruit two other characters (from the same set of five classes) and embark on missions assigned by the leaders of Avadon.

Each character class in Avadon 3 has its own set of several dozen abilities. These can be spells to inflict damage or summon aid, blessings and curses, and rituals that heal wounded party members. Avadon features elaborate scripted encounters that are intended to encourage a variety of tactics.

Combat in Avadon 3 is turn-based. Creatures in battle take turns acting, during which they can move, use abilities, and attack.

== Reception ==
Early critical reception of Avadon 3: The Warborn has been generally positive. OPN wrote: "The game possesses depth, quality art, fantastic gameplay, and provides a profound experience beyond casual entertainment. RPGWatch complimented the game's "great writing and story, as well as an enjoyable party based tactical combat system".
