= Avadon: The Black Fortress =

2011 video game

- Logo for Avadon: The Black Fortress
- Developer: Spiderweb Software
- Publisher: Spiderweb Software
- Platforms: Mac OS X; Windows; iOS; Android; Linux
- Release: Mac OS X; February 28, 2011; Windows; May 2, 2011; iOS; June 18, 2011; Android, Linux; March 19, 2012
- Genre: Role-playing
- Mode: Single-player

Avadon: The Black Fortress is a single-player role-playing video game developed by Spiderweb Software. It is the first game in the Avadon trilogy. The game was released for Mac OS X in February 2011, and for Windows in May. Another version was released for the iPad on June 18. It was later released for Android and Linux, and included in the Humble Bundle for Android 2.

== Setting ==
The Avadon series is set on the fictional continent of Lynaeus, which is divided between two primary warring factions, with internal struggles within these factions. There is the Pact, an alliance of five nations, in the centre of Lynaeus, and the Farlands, a loose-knit group of faded empires and barbarian territories, on the outskirts of Lynaeus. The Pact has banded together to fend off invasion from the Farlands. The Farlands include among their nations such fantasy creatures as Wretches, Giants, and Titans, with other fantasy creatures, such as Dragons, also existing within Lynaeus.

The fortress of Avadon is a force within the Pact; a small army of warriors, spies, assassins, and diplomats (known in-game as Hands, Eyes, and Hearts) tasked to protect the Pact and eliminate any threats to its safety, both internal and external, before they have the chance to grow. The servants of Avadon have great power and are not bound by the laws of the Pact, or rather, they are the law of the pact, though this can lead to corruption and abuse.

Avadon is led by its 'Keeper' Redbeard, a powerful and mysterious figure who was elected by the council that decides matters relevant to all members of the Pact, but in so being elected Redbeard holds the position of keeper for (his unnaturally long) life. The player controls a group of Hands of Avadon, warriors under Redbeard's command who seek out and fight a conspiracy against the Pact.

== Gameplay ==
Avadon: The Black Fortress is a single-player role-playing video game. The player assumes the role of a Blademaster, a Shadowwalker, a Shaman, or a Sorceress and after that can variously recruit up to two other characters (from the same set of four classes) for missions assigned by the leaders of Avadon. This adds a more fleshed-out companion feature to Spiderweb software games than has existed previously, with these characters having their own opinions on the state of the pact and the player characters actions.

Each character class in Avadon has its own set of several dozen abilities. These can be spells to inflict damage or summon aid, blessings and curses, and rituals that heal wounded party members, or physical skills. Avadon features elaborate scripted encounters that are intended to encourage a variety of tactics, using differing party compositions.

== Reception ==
Reception

Aggregate scores
Aggregator	Score
GameRankings	77.44% (PC)
Metacritic	75/100 (PC)

Review scores
Publication	Score
GamePro	4/5
GameSpot	7/10

Avadon: The Black Fortress has generally received favorable reviews from gaming critics, scoring 77% at Metacritic from seven reviews and 77% from GameRankings from nine reviews. The game has been met with praise for its depth of storytelling and gameplay, while simultaneously receiving criticism for the use of crude graphics and lack of better sound effects.

Rock, Paper, Shotgun gave Avadon a positive review, claiming that "as simple as it looks, it's one of those games that's very easy to fire up for a few minutes, only to be magically transported without supper to 5AM the next day". GameSpot awarded the game 7/10, claiming that "just like the developer's earlier efforts in the Avernum and Geneforge franchises, the game compensates for its archaic visuals and sound with an engaging focus on storytelling and turn-based party combat that recalls the glory days of the Gold Box games from the late '80s and early '90s".
