= Avadon 2: The Corruption =

2013 video game

- Logo for Avadon 2: The Corruption
- Developer: Spiderweb Software
- Platforms: Microsoft Windows; Mac OS X iOS
- Release: NA: October 30, 2013
- Genre: Role-playing video game
- Mode: Single-player

Avadon 2: The Corruption is a single-player role-playing video game developed by Spiderweb Software. It is the second game in the Avadon trilogy. The game was released for Mac OS X and Microsoft Windows in October 2013, A version for the iPad was released in 2014.

== Setting ==
The Avadon series is set on the fictional continent of Lynaeus, which is divided between two warring factions. There is the Pact, an alliance of five nations, and the Farlands, a loose-knit group of faded empires and barbarian territories. The Pact has banded together for safety and to fend off invasion from the other lands of Lynaeus.

The fortress of Avadon is a force within the Pact, a small army of warriors, spies, and assassins tasked to protect the Pact and eliminate any threats to its safety before they have the chance to grow. The servants of Avadon have great power and are not bound by the laws of the Pact, though this can lead to corruption and abuse.

As Avadon 2 begins, Avadon has been sacked, and a host of invaders are preparing to invade the player's homeland. The player will be conscripted by Avadon and must hunt for a way to fend off the attackers.

== Gameplay ==
Avadon 2: The Corruption is a single-player role-playing video game. The player assumes the role of a Blademaster, a Shadowwalker, a Shaman, a Sorcerer, or a Tinkermage (a new class added in Avadon 2). Later, the player can recruit two other characters (from the same set of five classes) and embark on missions assigned by the leaders of Avadon.

Each character class in Avadon 2 has its own set of several dozen abilities. These can be spells to inflict damage or summon aid, blessings and curses, and rituals that heal wounded party members. Avadon features elaborate scripted encounters that are intended to encourage a variety of tactics.

Combat in Avadon 2 is turn-based. Creatures in battle take turns acting, during which they can move, use abilities, and attack.
