= Exile (1995 video game series) =

- Title screen of Escape from the Pit
- Genre: Role-playing video game
- Developer: Spiderweb Software
- Publisher: Fantasoft
- Creator: Jeff Vogel
- Platforms: Windows, Macintosh, Linux (Exile 3)
- First release: Exile: Escape from the Pit; January 1995
- Latest release: Blades of Exile; December 1997

Exile is a series of role-playing video games created by Jeff Vogel of Spiderweb Software. They were released as shareware titles for Macintosh and Windows systems. Exile III was also ported to Linux by a third party. There were four games released in the series. Each of the games were later revived in the Avernum series. Common to all games in the Exile series are 2D graphics and basic sound. The graphics in the first versions of Exile I and II had simple textures, colors and outlines, which were then replaced in later versions with Exile III's graphics. The games are designed to be non-linear and long in gameplay length.

== Gameplay ==
In each game, the player is required to create six characters to form a party of adventurers or may instead use a default party. The characters' general, combat, magic and miscellaneous skills can be customized along with the character names and graphics. From Exile II onward, characters can have their traits and race configured.

The games have three modes: Outdoor Mode, Town Mode and Combat Mode. In Outdoor Mode, the party can enter a town, engage a group of enemies in Combat Mode and rest (if the party has food). In Town Mode, the party can talk to people, purchase from shops (provided they have enough gold), train the characters (if they have sufficient gold and skill points), locate sub-quests, pick up items (from Exile 2 onward, items can be stolen) and enter Combat Mode. In Combat Mode, the party can attack enemies, defend themselves and pick up adjacent items. Combat Mode can be ended at any time in towns, but can only end outdoors when all enemies are killed.

Magic is divided into Mage and Priest spell types. Spells for attacking can only be cast in Combat Mode. Some spells, such as Light spells, can be cast at any time. Other spells can only be cast outdoors or in town when not in Combat Mode. The player can create a character equipped with spells up to level 3, but higher level spells must be purchased or found in special encounters.

== Games ==
A screenshot from the Mac edition of Exile I

=== Exile I: Escape from the Pit ===
The first game of the Exile trilogy released in January 1995 features a party of newly created characters thrown from the surface into the subterranean world known as Exile. Once here, the party discovers a civilization formed from the outcasts of the Empire above, a culture beset by constant warfare and monsters galore. The party meets with many of those who wish to get revenge on the Empire for the wrongs it has done to the people of Exile.

The characters become a rallying point around which the people of Exile who desire vengeance gather to focus their energies into finding a way to strike back against the Emperor of the surface. Together, the party manages to assassinate Emperor Hawthorne in his throne room, banish the demon king Grah-Hoth who was becoming a significant threat to the citizens of Exile, and secure an escape route to the surface.

=== Exile II: Crystal Souls ===
The second Exile game follows directly from the first, released in November 1996. The Empire has started recognizing the threat the Exiles pose and begin sending their army down into Exile in huge numbers. To make matters worse, unknown barriers of energy are sprouting up around the world. These barriers sometimes benefit the Exiles, but they also help the Empire who can afford the losses much more easily.

A new party of characters encounters one of the creatures causing the barriers to appear and go to meet with the unknown race to negotiate. In the end, the party is more successful and the Vahnatai joins with the Exiles to drive out the Empire. With the support of the Vahnatai, the Exiles turn the tables on the Empire and successfully repulse their invasion.

=== Exile III: Ruined World ===
The final Exile game in the trilogy takes place some time after Exile II, released in January 1997. The Linux version was ported by Boutell.com in Summer, 2000. Extensive preparation has taken place and now the Exiles are ready to send a select few back into the light of the surface. However, while the members of the expedition are at first stunned by the sheer beauty of the land around them, they begin to notice that the surface is not as perfect as it seems. The slimes the party encounters are only the first part of what becomes a series of monsters and terrible occurrences that are blighting the Empire and laying it to waste.

While scouting the land, as were the expedition members' orders from the nation of Exile, the members are asked by the Empire to help save the surface from its blight. They bring the Exiles and the Empire together as allies trying to find the cause of the destruction.

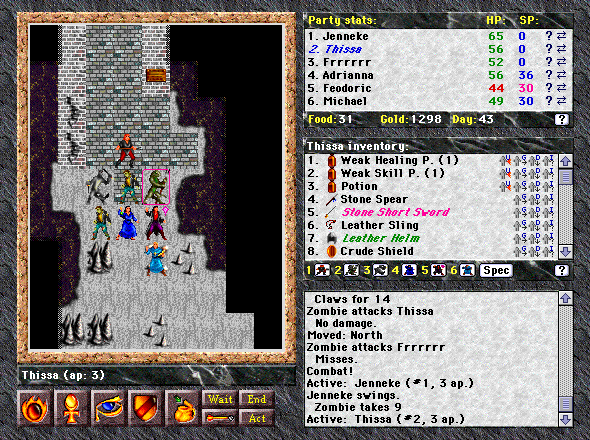
A screenshot of combat in the Mac edition of Blades of Exile

=== Blades of Exile ===
Blades of Exile was released in December 1997, consisting of three short scenarios set after the main trilogy as well as an editor that allows players to create their own scenarios, which need not be set in the Exile game world at all. Several hundred custom-made scenarios have been designed since the release of the game in 1997. The most prominent meeting places on the web of the Blades of Exile community are the official company-hosted internet forum. These forums offer support for beginning designers and players, reviews of new scenarios and general discussions about the use of the scenario editor. In June 2007, Jeff Vogel released the source code and game content for Blades of Exile, which is currently under version 2 of the GNU General Public License.

== Release ==
On December 1, 1998, the first three Exile games also came packaged on a CD called the "Exile Trilogy CD". As of July 8, 2013, these games are freeware on Spiderweb Software's website.

== Reception ==
Reviews described the Exile trilogy as a "throwback" to old fashioned role-playing games, with deep, complex gameplay and simplistic graphics. Computer Games Strategy Plus rated Exile: Escape from the Pit three and a half out of five stars, calling it "one of the year's best shareware games". The reviewer dropped a half star for its "primitive graphics", but found the game addictive and recommended it to veteran players that are "hungry for good, old fashioned fantasy role-playing games". Inside Mac Games rated Exile four out of five, calling it an Ultima-style role-playing game that required "patience and thoroughness" and had slightly "cheesy" graphics and sound. Inside Mac Games named Exile as runner up to Heroes of Might and Magic: A Strategic Quest for the best role-playing game of 1996.

Inside Mac Games awarded Exile II 4 out 5 and said that it carried on Exile's tradition as "truly a high quality Shareware game". A subsequent Inside Mac Games review said Exile II: Crystal Souls had "a size, scope and depth of plot unmatched in Macintosh role-playing games." Exile II: Crystal Souls was an honorable mention for MacUser's award for the best shareware game of 1996, behind winner Escape Velocity.

Computer Gaming World said that Exile III: Ruined World appears at first to be "a shareware game with primitive graphics", but reveals itself to be a "remarkably deep" traditional role-playing game with deceptive complexity. The reviewer praised the "well written and witty" NPC dialogue and elegant interface. Emil Pagliarulo reviewed Exile III positively for the Adrenaline Vault, rating it four out of five stars and calling it an "engrossing, thoroughly entertaining [...] epic computer role-playing game" with simplistic presentation and "enormous depth". Inside Mac Games rated Exile III 4 out of 5, saying that despite superficial similarities to previous games in the series, "enough new features, situations and challenges" would keep newcomers and veterans interested. The review concluded that Exile III was "more of the same old thing: inexpensive, challenging, interesting, exciting and entertaining." Inside Mac Games called Exile III "huge" and "highly detailed", with quality graphics, "an elegant interface", and "one of the largest and most detailed worlds and plots a fantasy role-playing game has offered". Exile III received the 1998 ZDNet Shareware Game of the Year award, selected by the editors of Ziff-Davis magazines FamilyPC, PC Magazine, and Computer Gaming World.

Inside Mac Games awarded Blades of Exile 3 out of 5, calling it "a nice, solid CRPG" that offered value for money and ran bug-free. The reviewer found the introductory scenario lacking in story, with too much repetitive combat and "plot-checks that have the potential to really aggravate".

== Avernum ==
Spiderweb Software has remade the Exile trilogy twice. The games were remade in 2000–2002 as the First Trilogy of the Avernum series, which replaced the two-dimensional tile-based graphics system of Exile with an isometric one and made numerous alterations to the RPG system and some changes to the content. The remakes were followed by a remake of Blades of Exile, Blades of Avernum, in 2004. The Exile trilogy was rebooted for a second time with the release of Avernum: Escape from the Pit (2011), Avernum 2: Crystal Souls (2015), and Avernum 3: Ruined World (2018). The remakes featured an enhanced game engine and expanded storylines.

== Engine and interface ==
While the game engine itself remained relatively similar between all games in the series, the interface went through many changes. Each iteration featured a new layout and color scheme. Individual elements, like the inventory and character roster boxes, were also changed to display information differently. Between Exile I and Exile II, the most notable difference is the background color and the border of the play window. Between Exile II and Exile III, the interface was changed significantly in that the colors and window styles were altered again, but the player roster was overhauled and an inventory window was added. The changes between Exile III and Blades of Exile were more subtle and were again of the color and style nature.

== See also ==
- List of open source games
