= The Quest (2006 video game) =

2006 video game

- Developer: Redshift
- Publishers: Chillingo (2006–2014), Redshift (2015–)
- Platforms: Pocket PC, Palm, iOS, Android, Microsoft Windows, macOS
- Release: NA: 2006
- Genre: Role-playing video game
- Mode: Single-player

The Quest is a role-playing video game developed by Hungarian studio Redshift for PDAs in 2006. The game was ported to modern mobile devices three years later, and a remastered version was released in 2016. The remastered version added support for Microsoft Windows and macOS.

== Gameplay ==
The Quest is a first-person role-playing video game set in an open world. Combat is turn-based, and movement takes place on a grid.

== History ==
Redshift initially developed The Quest for PDAs, such as the Pocket PC and Palm, and it was published in 2006. Twenty-Four expansions followed, most of which were developed by Zarista Games. In March 2009, the game was ported to iOS. Chillingo, who had previously published the game, stopped supporting it in May 2015. Publishing rights went to Redshift. A remastered version with new graphics was ported to Microsoft Windows in January 2016. In July, the remastered version, dubbed The Quest HD, was released for the iPad, and it was made available on the iPhone the following month. Redshift said they had been concerned that iPhone users might be confused because the HD version is incompatible with the expansions, which were never made available for the iPad. An Android version was released in October 2016. Eleven expansions been ported to the remastered version thus far. These function as standalone games if purchased separately; otherwise, existing characters may be imported.

== Reception ==
Reception

Review scores
| Publication | Score |
|---|---|
| TouchArcade | 5/5 (iOS, HD) |
| IGN | 8.5/10 (PC, HD) |
| Pocket Gamer | 3.5/5 (iOS) |

Reviewing the 2009 iOS release, Slide to Play described it as "a great, story-rich game that requires some patience for its blocky screens and difficult controls". In 2010, the classic version was selected as one of IGN's top five iPhone RPGs. The same year, PC World included it in their top 5 role-playing games for the iPhone, recommending it to fans of early 1990s PC games. In 2014, Shaun Musgrave of TouchArcade called this version "a true mobile classic" that "remains one of the best RPG experiences on a mobile device" despite its aging graphics. Damien McFerran of Pocket Gamer rated the classic version 3.5/5 stars and wrote, "If you consider yourself to be a fan of this genre, then this is one quest that is well worth undertaking."

Touch Arcade made The Quest HD its iOS game of the week. In their review, Musgrave rated it 5/5 stars and called it "an excellent remake". The Hungarian-language version of IGN rated the PC remaster 8.5/10.
