= Fortune Summoners: Secret of the Elemental Stone =

2008 video game

- Developer(s): Lizsoft
- Publisher(s): JP: Lizsoft; WW: Carpe Fulgur
- Engine: FOR-D System
- Platform(s): Microsoft Windows
- Release: JP: September 10, 2008; WW: January 30, 2012
- Genre(s): Dungeon crawler, action RPG, Metroidvania
- Mode(s): Single player

Fortune Summoners: Secret of the Elemental Stone (フォーチュンサモナーズ ～アルチェの精霊石～, Fōchun Samonāzu ~Aruche no Seirei Seki~) is a 2D side-scrolling action role-playing video game. The player takes the role of a sword-wielding girl named Arche who wants to learn magic.

== Gameplay ==
"Gameplay in Fortune Summoners consists of side-scrolling action, with you in control of one of three party members and the computer controlling the other two (with highly customizable AI dictating their actions). You will explore towns, delve dungeons, climb towers and, just maybe, find Arche a snack or two. Combat is different depending on who you control - Arche, being a swords-girl, controls in a fashion similar to a character from a brawler or fighting game, with many special moves tied to button combos. Sana and Stella, her companions, rely more on their varied selection of spells to see them through a fight - spells that rain ice down on enemies, make mirror images of friends, or set the ground ablaze!"

== Plot ==
Arche Plumfield, a young girl moves to the town of Tonkiness with her parents and enrolls in the local magic school. However, she soon finds out that in order to perform magic she needs the power of an elemental stone.

== Characters ==
- Arche Plumfield (アルチェ プラムフィールド): The player character. Cheerful and honest. Uses a short sword to fight.
- Sana Poanet (サナ ポアネット): A shy girl who uses water magic.
- Stella Mayberk (ステラ メイベルク): A haughty girl who uses fire magic.

== Release ==
Fortune Summoners was originally released by the Japanese dōjin soft group Lizsoft in 2008. A 2009 re-release offered graphical improvements, additional voice acting, and other added content. Carpe Fulgur localized the 2008 version for an English release in 2012.

== Reception ==
In the West, Fortune Summoners received mixed reviews from critics. Sam Marchello of RPGamer scored it 1.5 out of 5, calling the game "a repetitive nightmare" with "poorly designed dungeons and neverending cutscenes filled with trite dialogue." Francisco Acosta, writing for MeriStation, said that "For lovers of titles like Ghosts'n Goblins, Zelda II or Wonder Boy, Fortune Summoners is nothing short of essential, but we must bear in mind its limitations."

Metacritic: 60/100

== Censorship Controversy ==
For audiences outside Japan, the game developers censored a hot springs scene. This change caused some degree of controversy, though the change was self-made and was not done specifically to comply with any laws.
