= Vay (video game) =

1993 video game

- North American box cover art
- Developer: Hertz
- Publishers: SIMS (JP); Working Designs (US); SoMoGa, Inc. (iOS)
- Platforms: Sega CD; Apple iPhone; Android; Steam
- Release: Sega CD: JP: October 22, 1993; NA: July 1994; iOS; July 11, 2008; PC, Android; July 7, 2024
- Genre: Role-playing video game
- Mode: Single-player

Vay (pronounced "Vy"), released in Japan as Vay: Ryuusei no Yoroi (ヴァイ 流星の鎧; lit. "Vay: Meteor Armor"), is a 1993 role-playing video game for the Sega CD. It was developed by Hertz, published by SIMS in Japan, and localized by Working Designs for the United States. In 2008 it was re-released for the iPhone by SoMoGa, Inc. In 2024 it was re-released for Steam.

== Story ==
Over a millennium ago, in a far away part of the galaxy, a huge interstellar war had taken place. During the conflict, a large machine escapes the battlefield. Its guidance system damaged and pilot dead, it continued to hurtle outward into space. After a time, it crashed into the planet of Vay. This planet is inhabited by people, but they have little technology. The machine, programmed only for death, rampages across the planet killing and destroying anything it sees.

It takes the combined forces of the five mightiest wizards on the planet to stop the machine. Its power is sealed away in five magical orbs, which are taken to far away hidden places. The machine itself is also locked away.

In the kingdom of Lorath, Prince Sandor is about to wed his love, Lady Elin. The most important dignitaries of the four kingdoms have attended, ensuring that the kingdom of Lorath is secure for another generation.

While in the middle of their wedding ceremony, the castle is attacked by a large fleet of robots. During the siege, Lorath Castle is reduced to ruins, and Elin is kidnapped by one of the machines. Sandor vows to rescue his betrothed from her captors.

== Gameplay ==
Vay is an archetypal JRPG. Characters gain experience and gold by defeating monsters via random encounters. Players can purchase new equipment and items, and most of the characters can learn new spells as their levels advance. The game also features a rudimentary AI system, allowing the characters to fight with no input through the player.

== Characters ==
Protagonists

- Sandor or Heibelger is Vay's protagonist, and the Prince of Lorath. He takes it upon himself to rescue his bride Elin, and eventually becomes the pilot of the legendary Armor of Vay.
- Pottle is the apprentice of Otto, a well-known wizard. He wields considerable magical power.
- Rachel or Feilong is a mercenary that relies on brute strength to defeat her enemies.
- P.J., or Prudence Jurissa, or Nina, is young woman who wields powerful magic. She quickly develops a crush on Sandor after their initial meeting.
- Lynx or Lance is a free-spirited, hard-drinking bard. He is a well-rounded combatant but has a rude and questionable demeanor.
- Kinsey or Mintz is the Captain of the Pirates of Exeter Village. She allows the party use of her ship at a key point in the story.
- Otto is an elderly but wise wizard. He offers advice to Sandor frequently throughout the game.

Antagonists

- Jeal or Zeal is the ruler of the Danek Empire and Vay's secondary antagonist. He lusts after the power that the Vay Armor is rumored to bestow upon its pilot.
- Sadoul is Jeal's/Zeal's adviser and Vay's main antagonist. He seems to have Jeal's/Zeal's best interests in mind, but seems to have an unhealthy interest in the Vay Armor as well.

== iPhone edition ==
A version of Vay was released by SoMoGa, Inc. for the iPhone and iPod Touch platforms in July 2008. This version includes a new voice cast and content which was not released in the original Sega CD version as "extra" content once the player finishes the game. Some names in the iPhone and iPod touch vary between the other one. The software was updated in September 2012.

== Reception ==
Game Informer rated the game 8.25 out of 10. GamePro commented that the story, stylistics, and general progression of Vay are generic and forgettable, but that the game is overall worthwhile for the sole reason of its intelligent dialogue. Electronic Gaming Monthly also criticized the story as generic and unoriginal, but concluded that the large game world, numerous playable characters, and "excellent" cinemas would ensure that the game appeals to RPG fans. They gave it a 5.4 out of 10.

VideoGames selected it as the runner-up for 1994's Best Role-Playing Game (below Final Fantasy III) and Best Sega CD Game.
