= Queen's Wish: The Conqueror =

- Developer: Spiderweb Software
- Publisher: Spiderweb Software
- Platforms: Windows; macOS; iOS
- Release: Windows, macOS; September 11, 2019; iOS; December 4, 2019
- Genre: Role-playing
- Mode: Single-player

Queen's Wish: The Conqueror is a single-player role-playing video game developed by Spiderweb Software. It is the first game in the planned Queen's Wish series. The game was released for macOS and Windows in September 2019. A version for iOS was released in December 2019. Queen's Wish: The Conqueror was announced as a Kickstarter in May, 2018 and was fully funded on the first day. Queen's Wish was released simultaneously on Steam, GOG.com, itch.io, and the web site of Spiderweb Software.

== Gameplay ==
Screenshot of Queen's Wish: The Conqueror.

Queen's Wish: The Conqueror is a single-player role-playing video game. The player controls the youngest prince or princess of Queen Sharyn, the absolute leader of the Empire of Haven. The player will then assemble a group of adventurers, who can use melee weapons, missile weapons, magic, or a mix of these skills to defeat opponents. The game system in Queen's Wish is skill based. Characters have access to skills in battle, magic, support, and special abilities depending on what country the character comes from. You can build characters to confront a certain challenge, and then you can retrain your characters as circumstances change. Queen's Wish features elaborate scripted encounters that are intended to encourage a variety of character builds and tactics.

As royalty of Haven, the player can also conquer forts and rebuild them, choosing what shops and fortifications to build. Getting resources to rebuild the forts is a major activity, and these workshops will be a main source of the character's strength.

== Setting ==
Queen's Wish concerns itself with the lost colony of Sacramentum, a land that broke free of the rule of Haven. The player must choose whether to regain control of this colony and win the queen's favor, or break free and find his or her own path. The land of Sacramentum contains a network of old, ruined Haven fortresses. Capturing and rebuilding them is a major part of building the main character's power.
