= Avernum 3: Ruined World =

2018 video game

- Developer: Spiderweb Software
- Platforms: Windows; macOS; iOS
- Release: NA: January 31, 2018
- Genre: Role-playing
- Mode: Single-player

Avernum 3: Ruined World is a single-player role-playing video game developed by Spiderweb Software. It is the third game in the Avernum series. The game was released for macOS and Windows in January 2018. An iOS version was released on April 18, 2018.

== Gameplay ==
Screenshot of Avernum 3: Ruined World.

Avernum 3: Ruined World is a single-player role-playing video game. The player controls a group of up to four adventurers, who can use melee weapons, missile weapons, magic, or a mix of these skills to defeat opponents. The game system in Avernum 3 is skill based. Characters choose a character class at the beginning of the game, but this only determines the character's starting skills. The player is then free to train the character in 28 different skills, ranging from melee weapons to arcane lore to first aid. Characters in Avernum 3 have access to over 60 different spells and battle disciplines. These can be spells to inflict damage or summon aid, blessings and curses, and rituals that heal wounded party members. Avernum 3 features elaborate scripted encounters that are intended to encourage a variety of tactics.

Avernum 3 features a large world that evolves as time passes. Towns will fall to the monsters and refugees will move from town to town. An open-ended system allows a variety of different playstyles. The player can fight monsters or ignore the main quest and become a merchant or bounty hunter. Combat in Avernum 3 is turn-based. Creatures in battle take turns acting, during which they can move, use abilities, and attack.

== Setting ==
The Avernum series is the third chapter in the Avernum series. It is based in Avernum, a subterranean nation far under the surface of the world. Avernum is a prison, the destination of petty criminals and rebels from the surface. As Avernum 3 begins, the Avernites have found a way to leave the underworld. However, the surface is being ravaged by waves of monsters. If the player can't find a way to end this invasion, there will be no surface world to escape to.

== Development ==
Jeff Vogel, who does the programming and game design himself, said he did a remake of Avernum III because it was not functioning on modern systems. He also wanted to port it to newer systems and improve the game design. Vogel described it as the largest of his games, inspired by the epic scope of The Elder Scrolls.

== Reception ==
Digitally Downloaded called it the best of the Avernum series and praised its uncompromising faithfulness to its niche of retrogaming. In a roundup of the best iOS games of 2018, TouchArcade recommended it to players who want a role-playing game with "serious meat on its bones". Pocket Tactics wrote, "Fans will need no convincing, but get past the rudimentary presentation, and even determined novice players will find Avernum a world worth exploring." In a news post, PC World described it as a fan favorite and good entry point for newcomers.
