= Least squares conformal map =

A least squares conformal map (LSCM) is quasiconformal mesh parameterisation method which produces a 2D representation (conformal map) of a 3D surface based on the least squares approximation of the Cauchy-Riemann equations. By using the map as a guide when creating a new 2D image, the colors of the 2D image can be applied to the original 3D model.

LSCM is used in computer graphics as a method of producing a UV map from a polygonal mesh to a texture map such that the shape of the polygons as mapped to the texture is relatively undistorted.
