= Geneforge 4: Rebellion =

2006 video game

- Developer: Spiderweb Software
- Publisher: Spiderweb Software
- Designer: Jeff Vogel
- Series: Geneforge
- Platforms: Mac OS X, Microsoft Windows
- Release: Mac OS X: NA: November 20, 2006; Microsoft Windows: NA: February 4, 2007 (Online); NA: November 3, 2011 (Steam)
- Genre: Role-playing
- Mode: Single-player

Geneforge 4: Rebellion is the fourth video game in the Geneforge series of role-playing video games created by Spiderweb Software.

== Features ==
Unlike the previous three Geneforge games, the player character is no longer a Shaper, and is not restricted to the original three classes (Shaper, Guardian and Agent). The player can choose from five separate classes (all rebels), including playing a servile, which can alter the way other Rebels or Shapers speak to the player.

The screen in Geneforge 4 is considerably larger, with a bigger map and smaller icons, leaving much more room for viewing. The graphics were improved somewhat, with better animations and cut-scenes than the previous three games. The sounds and general flow of the game were still the same.

== Plot ==
The player as a prospective rebel and General Greta make a hasty journey to the Southforge citadel losing other members of their group on the way. The player is to be transformed via the Geneforge to become powerful enough to lead the rebels against the Shaper Army.

With Southforge about to fall to the Shapers, the Rebels prepare to evacuate to the last safehouse in the Ilya Province. It is at this point the player can make a serious choice that will alter the plotline: Either secretly join the Shapers, or continue to help the Rebels. Either way the player ends up at the safehouse. Occasionally the player runs into the Trakovite agents offered the choice to join them.

Once at the safehouse, it is learned the Shapers have cut off Rebel reinforcements by blockading the Barrier Zone underground with three extremely powerful Shapers and their armies of powerful creations. Moseh, one of the three, has become a bit unstable and is threatening both Shapers and Rebels alike. Depending on whether the player is pro-rebel or pro-shaper, the player will be commanded to kill him or restore him, respectively.

After crossing the barrier zone, the player enters the Fens of Aziraph, where the Shapers and Rebels have joined forces to fight the crazed Shaper Monarch, a madman who seeks to dominate the world. Once the Shaper Monarch is defeated, the player has the options to confirm whether to join the Shapers or the Rebels otherwise join the Trakovites.

In the Burwood Province, the heart of the Rebel lands, the Shapers have sent several "infiltrators" into this area to harass the Rebels, and have also landed a massive army in some ruins. The Shapers require the player aid their infiltration and help the army while, the Rebels require the player to kill the infiltrators and destroy the army. The player then meets the leader of the rebellion Ghaldring, who sends the player to the Grayghost mountains to complete the Unbound, the Rebels' secret weapon to turn the tide of the war.

Once in the mountains, it is time to awaken the drakon's ultimate creation, the Unbound: amazingly powerful, completely mindless and almost indestructible drakons of enormous size. “The goal of the Rebels is to release them to run amok in Shaper lands, to finally end the conflict once and for all.” At this point the player can help the rebels and reap the rewards of the Unbound, assist the Shapers to destroy the Rebel leadership and ruin the Unbound, or join the Trakovites and put an end to shaping here for good. The choice made, presents one of over a dozen possible endings, all depending on the actions taken throughout the game.
