= Avernum 2: Crystal Souls =

2015 video game

- Logo for Avernum 2: Crystal Souls
- Developer: Spiderweb Software
- Publisher: Spiderweb Software
- Platforms: Microsoft Windows; OS X; iOS
- Release: NA: January 14, 2015
- Genre: Role-playing
- Mode: Single-player

Avernum 2: Crystal Souls is a role-playing video game developed by Spiderweb Software. It is the second game in the Avernum series. The game was released for OS X and Microsoft Windows in January 2015, The iPad version was released on the App Store on April 15, 2015.

== Setting ==
The Avernum series is based in Avernum, a subterranean nation. The surface is ruled by the Empire, who exiles anyone to Avernum who speaks out, misbehaves, or does not fit in. When someone from Avernum assassinates the cruel Emperor, the Empire take revenge by invading Avernum. At the same time, magical barriers appear and block both sides from access to various cities. The story is a standalone but builds on the previous game's story.

== Gameplay ==
Screenshot

Avernum 2: Crystal Souls is a single-player role-playing video game. The player controls a group of up to four adventurers, each of whom can be customized via a skill tree. It features an open world that players can explore and many side quests. Combat is turn-based and tactical.

== Development ==
The game is a remake of Avernum 2, which was itself a remake of Exile 2. Jeff Vogel, who programmed and designed the game, updated the quests, dialogue, and dungeons. In some cases, he said he completely rewrote them or added new options.

== Reception ==
Reception

Aggregate score
Aggregator	Score
Metacritic	78/100

Review scores
Publication	Score
RPGamer	3.5/5
TouchArcade	(iOS) 4.5/5
Digitally Downloaded	4/5

Avernum 2 received "generally favorable" reviews, according to review aggregator Metacritic. RPGamer said the game would not appeal to a mainstream audience, but they praised the worldbuilding and amount of content. Though also acknowledging the game's niche appeal, Digitally Downloaded praised the game's story and exploration. TouchArcade called it "a classic experience that is rarely seen in today’s modern RPGs" and said that the iPad version has a better control scheme than the PC version.
