= Quiver (video game) =

1997 video game

- Title screen of Quiver
- Developer: ESD Games
- Publisher: ESD Games
- Platform: MS-DOS
- Release: March 1997
- Genre: First-person shooter
- Mode: Single-player

Quiver is a 1997 first-person shooter video game developed and published by ESD Games. The game revolves around the player infiltrating alien bases with an arsenal of weapons to recover time-traveling orbs. The game was intentionally designed as a clone of the first-person shooter Doom (1993) and was geared toward inexpensive computers. It was released as shareware for MS-DOS.

== Gameplay ==
Quiver is a first-person shooter video game. The premise of Quiver is that aliens have stolen orbs that can travel back in time, and the player's mission is to infiltrate their bases and recover the orbs. The game has 27 levels divided across three episodes, with the goal of each level being to traverse a base and retrieve three orbs. Along the way, the player must fight projectile-shooting enemies with an arsenal of weapons, which include the Spiker, which shoots spiked balls; the Fajita Maker, which shoots three fireballs; the Shredder, which lobs sticky grenades; the Alien Hell Hands, which shoots projectiles around the player; and the Medusa Sphere, which reflects incoming projectiles back to the player's enemies.

== Development ==
Quiver was developed by ESD Games, a company based in Tampa, Florida. The game was designed by Mike Taylor on an "archaic 486DX33 system with an ancient 512K VLB (VESA Local Bus) VGA card" as a clone of the first-person shooter Doom that could run smoothly on inexpensive computers while being fun. The graphics are less violent than most other first-person shooters. Quiver was released in March 1997 for the MS-DOS as shareware, with the first episode serving as a demo and the rest of the game being unlocked upon inputting a registration code.

== Reception ==
According to ESD Games, Quiver was downloaded 500,000 times. Reviews of Quiver have been mixed. In a March 1997 review, The Tampa Tribune found the game fun and fast-paced and the weapons to be creative. A month later, Games Domain wrote of the gameplay being decent and fun, but criticized the game's lack of key functions such as a multiplayer mode. In September 1997, PC Player found Quiver outdated, finding fault with its game engine and controls. In a May 2017 retrospective review by Hardcore Gaming 101, Quiver was assessed, across its gameplay and technicals, as unremarkable and dull.
