= Qin: Tomb of the Middle Kingdom =

- Cover art
- Developer: Learn Technologies Interactive
- Publisher: Time Warner Electronic Publishing
- Platforms: Windows, Macintosh
- Release: 1997 (Windows)
- Genre: Graphic Adventure
- Mode: Single-player

Qin: Tomb of the Middle Kingdom is a Myst-like graphic adventure computer game developed by Learn Technologies Interactive, published by Time Warner Interactive and released for Windows and Macintosh systems.

== Development ==
The game was revealed at the 1996 Electronic Entertainment Expo. Their booth was "filled with green foliage and running water stocked with free refreshments", described as an "attractive place to rest and relax in the midst of chaos".

== Plot ==
The game takes place in the year 2010, where the international conglomerate "Mega Media", headed by Hal Davis, funds a government-approved excavation of the Qin burial mound. The player assumes the role of a researcher assigned to this project (in reality, the chamber of the terracotta army is the furthest any archaeological team has progressed). One night, as the researcher is exploring alone, a sudden earthquake opens up the ground underneath, and the researcher tumbles into a deeper part of the tomb. While exploring the tomb, he is privy to the observations of the ghost of a Chinese scholar, who was aware of the brutal nature of the emperor and a witness to this brutality.

The game eventually leads to a goal the emperor sought in life—an elixir that can confer immortality. Possessing this, the player has a choice: give it to the almost dead Qin, who will be revived; deliver it to Hal Davis; or pour it into a scale model of the planet. Each has its own result—the renewed emperor will retake control of China, Hal Davis becomes immortal in a decaying world, or kick-start the restoration of the planet itself, respectively.

== Reviews ==
Reception

Review scores
Publication	Score
Computer Games Strategy Plus	2/5
Next Generation	1/5
PC Games	B
MacHome Journal	4/5

A reviewer for Next Generation gave the game one out of five stars, saying that though the puzzles are trickier than most Myst clones, requiring the player to read up on Chinese history and mythology, it is still an excessively dull experience.

The Computer Game Developers Conference nominated Qin for its 1996 "Best Prerendered Art" Spotlight Award, which ultimately went to Zork Nemesis.

Entertainment Weekly gave the game an A−.
