= The Quivering =

1997 video game

- Developer: Charybdis
- Publisher: Alternative Software
- Producer: Andy Smith
- Composers: Jim Croft; Zoe Dolphin
- Platforms: MS-DOS, Windows
- Release: 1997
- Genre: Point-and-click
- Mode: Single-player

The Quivering (also known as Spud II) is a single-player point-and-click video game, developed by Charybdis and released by Alternative Software on CD-ROM for MS-DOS and Microsoft Windows. The game was later re-released for Steam on January 28, 2015. It is a sequel to Charybdis' earlier 1996 game Spud!.

== Plot ==
Located in the fictional setting of Warty Hollow, Olivetti Franken-Stamp and his assistant Gore were creating the Ghoul Cube: a device which would ensnare and contain any source of evil it comes across, rendering it harmless. However, this experiment backfired and opened a portal to Dimension X, which unleashed a horde of monsters throughout the land led by the evil Big D, a demon who transformed Olivetti into a raven and Gore into a giant tentacled monster. Olivetti's nephew, Spud, steps forth to defeat Big D, restore his uncle and save the world from the incoming horror.

The first half of the game revolves around Spud retrieving various ingredients in the surrounding locations, in order to make an antidote that will cure the monstrous Gore, as he is obstructing the entrance to the laboratory containing the portal to Dimension X. Once Gore is cured, Spud is able to open the portal to Dimension X and summon Big D once more. The demon is defeated in a fight by Frank, an inanimate being who is brought to life in a similar fashion to Frankenstein's monster, when Spud awakens him by placing a brain in his head.

However, while the portal is sending all of the unleashed monsters back to Dimension X, Spud and Frank are swept away by its pull as well, landing them in a twisted carnival run by Big D. Spud uses another brain to reawaken Frank, who now resembles Elvis Presley in both voice and appearance. The two of them traverse the fairgrounds together in an effort to defeat Big D once and for all.

Once the duo reaches Big D's lair, Spud is struck and killed by the demon, leading Frank to take on Big D by himself. He wins the battle, knocking Big D out of the arena and into its surrounding pit, where he is never to be seen again. Frank then absorbs all of Big D's power, represented by a battery that was literally powering the electricity in the carnival. He gains the ability to open a portal back to Earth's surface, where he takes Spud's cadaver.

After Frank's return to Earth, the now human Olivetti is able to bring Spud back to life through an experiment in his laboratory.

== Gameplay ==
The player controls Spud from a first-person point of view, by moving from area to area and looking around in a 360 degree rotation. Moving is done by clicking the space in between two areas. A variety of unique items which are required to progress further are located in certain areas. Also found throughout the adventure are imps, which can be combined with other items or used to save the game. The Ghoul Cube is used as an inventory where the player can check their items or save their game using an imp. The game also makes use of a fast travel system for its first half, consisting of obelisks that are found at certain points of interest and can be warped to and from.

Most of the gameplay revolves around simple puzzles, where the player must find out which item to use in each situation. Sometimes deduction is required in discovering what to do next, which could mean either talking to other characters or observing Spud's surroundings for clues. Certain sections require attentive actions to be taken in order to clear them. Much like its predecessor, the game has many moments that can equate to an instant game over, where one wrong input will lead to Spud being killed, as shown in a cutscene. After this happens, the game returns to the main menu where the player can load a saved game.

== Reception ==
Reception

Review score
Publication	Score
PC Zone	73% (DOS)
