= Blades of Exile =

1997 video game

- Start menu
- Developer: Spiderweb Software
- Publisher: Diversions Entertainment
- Designer: Jeff Vogel
- Artist: Andrew Hunter
- Series: Exile
- Platforms: Macintosh, Windows
- Release: Mac December 1997 Windows 28 February 1998
- Genre: Role-playing
- Mode: Single-player

Blades of Exile is a 1997 shareware role-playing video game developed and published by Spiderweb Software. The game is the fourth and last title in the Exile series. It features an editor, allowing players to create, edit and share their own scenarios in addition to the three scenarios packaged with the game. Upon release, critics praised the addition of new gameplay features and the editor, but were critical of the simplicity and limited graphics.

== Gameplay ==
In-game screenshot

Blades of Exile introduces several improvements over past Exile titles, including the addition of an automap and new dialog system. It also features an editor to create, edit and play scenarios. The scenario creator supports the ability to create dialogue and quests, and a palette system to make terrain and scenery on scenario maps, as well as place and edit items, doors, structures, signs and monsters. It was released as shareware, with players only able to complete the first scenario unless the game was registered, upon which two more scenarios became available.

== Plot ==
Blades of Exile contains three developer-created scenarios. In The Valley of Dying Things, players must uncover the source of the valley's pollution. A Mild Rebellion sees players infiltrate a small band of outlaws, and The Za-Khazi Run sets players with twenty days to traverse a maze of caves to reach the titular fort to deliver supplies.

== Development ==
Blades of Exile was developed by Spiderweb Software, the independent studio of developer Jeff Vogel. In 2007, Vogel released the source code of Blades of Exile on his website under a Common Public License. Following release, Vogel re-created the game's engine and scenario editor for Blades of Avernum, featuring more powerful scripting capabilities.

== Reception ==
Reception

Review scores
| Publication | Score | |
| Publication | Macintosh | PC |
|---|---|---|
| AllGame | 4.5 | N/A |
| Computer Games Strategy Plus | N/A | 4/5 |

Lisa Karen Savignano of Allgame praised the "excellent" scenarios for their quality and replay value and improvements from previous Exile titles, but felt the combat was repetitive and the "biggest drawback of the series". Computer Games Magazine similarly commended the "powerful and fully-functional" editor and the "amazing variety of user-created scenarios" created online. However, the publication also remarked that the game had "mediocre graphics" and lacked the sophistication of mainstream commercial products. Describing the series as the best shareware role-playing title on the market, Andy Backer of Computer Games Strategy Plus enjoyed the new improvements in the series and the "sophisticated and elegant" editor, although he felt the three scenarios were too small and the graphics were limited. PC Zone considered the game would keep fans of the role-playing genre occupied, but they went on to say that "the graphics don't exactly look stunning".
