= Spiderweb Software =

American video game company

- Type: Private
- Industry: Video games
- Founded: September 1994
- Headquarters: Seattle, Washington
- Key people: Jeff Vogel
- Products: Geneforge; Avernum
- Website: spiderwebsoftware.com

Spiderweb Software is an independent video game developer founded in 1994 by Jeff Vogel in Seattle, Washington. Its primary focus is on creating demoware games for the Mac, Microsoft Windows, Android and the iPad. The games emphasize storytelling and turn-based gameplay and use a retro style of graphics.

== Games ==
=== Developed games ===
Release timeline
1995	Exile I: Escape from the Pit
1996	Exile II: Crystal Souls
1997	Exile III: Ruined World
1997	Blades of Exile
1998	Nethergate
1999
2000	Avernum
2000	Avernum 2
2001	Geneforge
2002	Avernum 3
2003	Geneforge 2
2004	Blades of Avernum
2005	Geneforge 3
2005	Avernum IV
2006	Geneforge 4: Rebellion
2007	Nethergate: Resurrection
2007	Avernum V
2008	Geneforge 5: Overthrow
2009	Avernum 6
2010
2011	Avadon: The Black Fortress
2011	Avernum: Escape From the Pit
2012
2013	Avadon 2: The Corruption
2014
2015	Avernum 2: Crystal Souls
2016	Avadon 3: The Warborn
2017
2018	Avernum 3: Ruined World
2019	Queen's Wish: The Conqueror
2020
2021	Geneforge 1 - Mutagen
2022	Queen's Wish 2: The Tormentor
2023
2024	Geneforge 2 - Infestation
2025	Avernum 4: Greed and Glory

Spiderweb Software is most notable for the following RPG video games:

- The Exile trilogy of underground adventures (1995-1997).
  - Blades of Exile, a non-canonical continuation featuring a scenario creation kit.
- Nethergate, a fantasy game based upon the Roman occupation of Britain (1998). The game was eventually revamped under the title Nethergate: Resurrection (2007).
- The first Avernum trilogy, which are expanded remakes of the Exile series, using the Nethergate game engine, with several enhancements to the visual design and gameplay (2000-2002).
  - Blades of Avernum, a non-canonical continuation featuring a scenario creation kit.
- The five-part Geneforge series, notable for its unique gameplay involving the creation of creatures to assist the player (2001-2008).
- The Second Avernum trilogy, continuing and ultimately finishing the story of Avernum, using a variation of the Geneforge game engine (2005-2009).
- Avadon: The Black Fortress, the first game in a new trilogy (2011). Avadon features a new game setting, interface, and combat system.
  - Avadon 2: The Corruption. The second game released in the Avadon trilogy (2013).
  - Avadon 3: The Warborn. The third game released in the Avadon trilogy (2016).
- Avernum: Escape From the Pit (2011), Avernum 2: Crystal Souls (2015), and Avernum 3: Ruined World (2018), remakes of the first Avernum trilogy, with reworked game mechanics, and new graphics and sound effects.
- Queen's Wish: The Conqueror, the first game in a new fantasy series (2019). This series focuses on capturing and building fortresses and explores the mechanics and morality of building empires.
  - Queen's Wish 2: The Tormentor. The second game released in the Queen's Wish trilogy. It was released on August 24, 2022.
- Geneforge 1 - Mutagen (2021) is a remake of the first Geneforge game. It was released on February 24, 2021.
  - Geneforge 2 - Infestation (2024) is a remake of the second Geneforge game. It was released on March 27, 2024.
- Avernum 4: Greed and Glory (2025) is a remake of the first game of the second Avernum trilogy.

=== Published games ===
The company previously provided distribution services and other support for other shareware developers, Chromite Software (Richard White), Crystal Shard, and Dragon Lore. The games included:

- Galactic Core (developed by Chromite Software).
- Lost Souls (developed by Chromite Software).
- Ocean Bound (developed by Chromite Software).
- SubTerra (developed by Crystal Shard).
- Homeland: The Stone of Night (developed by Dragon Lore).

In June 2007, Jeff Vogel announced that the company would no longer be supporting games by other developers, and they are no longer available for download through Spiderweb's main site.

== Awards ==
- Exile II: Crystal Souls – 1996 "Shareware Game of the Year" (Honorable Mention), Wasson, Gregory (October 1996). "1996 MacUser Shareware Awards". MacUser.
- Exile III: Ruined World – "Shareware Game of the Year", "1998 Shareware Award Winners". Computer Gaming World. October 1998.
- Nethergate – "RPG of the Year" (Honorable Mention), Computer Games Magazine
- Geneforge 4: Rebellion – "Indie RPG of the year" GameBanshee
