= Avernum =

- Genre: Role-playing
- Developer: Spiderweb Software
- Publisher: Spiderweb Software
- Platforms: Microsoft Windows, Macintosh, iOS
- First release: Avernum; January 2, 2000
- Latest release: Avernum 4: Greed and Glory; October 22, 2025

Avernum is a series of demoware role-playing video games by Jeff Vogel of Spiderweb Software available for Macintosh and Windows-based computers. Several are available for iPad, and were formerly available for Android.

There are six canonical games in the series. The first three games in the series are remakes of the Exile series, collectively entitled Avernum: First Trilogy. The next three games (Avernum: Second Trilogy) were released in 2005, 2007, and 2009, respectively, are built on a newer game engine, and are entirely original, not being remakes of any previous games. The Avernum games, like other Spiderweb Software games, are designed with a focus on gameplay and storytelling over graphical elements. In December 2011, a newer version of Avernum was released, Avernum: Escape from the Pit, followed by its sequels Avernum 2: Crystal Souls in 2015, Avernum 3: Ruined World in 2018, and Avernum 4: Greed and Glory in 2025.

== Improvements over Exile ==
The original Exile games used a top-down perspective tile-based graphical system, effectively displayed as an X-Y axis wherein each tile in the grid was filled by a base graphic and perhaps an item or character icon. Avernum features a 45-degree axonometric display that appears three-dimensional. The game also adds varying terrain height, allowing for more interesting map layouts.

As the first three games in the series are remakes of the Exile series, the primary plot devices remain relatively unchanged, while many new encounters and side quests are added. With the design overhaul came improvements to the graphical user interface (GUI) and the storyline. Also, Avernum has a maximum of four party members instead of six (with the minor exception of two NPCs in Blades of Avernum). In-game art by Phil Foglio lends a more humorous feel to the game.

== Games ==
Release timeline
1995	Exile I: Escape from the Pit
1996	Exile II: Crystal Souls
1997	Exile III: Ruined World
1997	Blades of Exile
1998
1999
2000	Avernum
2000	Avernum 2
2001
2002	Avernum 3
2003
2004	Blades of Avernum
2005	Avernum IV
2006
2007	Avernum V
2008
2009	Avernum VI
2010
2011	Avernum: Escape from the Pit
2012
2013
2014
2015	Avernum 2: Crystal Souls
2016
2017
2018	Avernum 3: Ruined World
2019
2020
2021
2022
2023
2024
2025	Avernum 4: Greed and Glory

The Avernum games take place largely in a subterranean world known as Avernum. The main conflict of the series is between the Avernites and the surface kingdom, known as the Empire.

The game features several races. Humans are the dominant race in the series, with the Nephilim and Slithzerikai being two other primary races. The Vahnatai, a race of highly magical and alien creatures, live in the deeper caves of Avernum.

The Avernum series, similar to the Exile series before it, is demoware. The user can download the program for free, and play a significant part of the game without restrictions. The demo ends at a certain point in the storyline, at which time the user must purchase a registration key to continue playing.

=== Avernum: First Trilogy ===
==== Avernum ====
Screenshot of the original Avernum, showing a party about to enter an inn.

Avernum, the first game of the Avernum series, features a party of characters thrown from the surface world into the subterranean Avernum. Once here, the player discovers a culture that has formed from the outcasts of the Empire above: a culture beset by constant warfare and monsters galore. In Avernum, adventurers meet with many who wish to get revenge on the Empire for the wrongs it has done to the Avernites.

Besides countless side quests along the way, the game offers three primary quests: killing the demon Grah-Hoth, discovering a route back to the surface, and assassinating Emperor Hawthorne of the surface world.

The game was remade as Avernum: Escape from the Pit in December 2011 for OS X and April 2012 for iOS and Windows. This remade version is the second remake of Escape from the Pit and uses a new game engine.

==== Avernum 2 ====
Avernum 2 takes place five years after the events in the original Avernum. Upon assassination of Emperor Hawthorne, the Empire of the surface recognizes the threat the Avernites pose and begins sending huge military forces down to Avernum. To make matters worse, unknown barriers of energy are sprouting up around the Avernum, which divides Avernum's forces, making them weaker.

The player controls a party of characters that meets one of the Vahnatai creatures responsible for the barriers in Avernum, and travels to meet with their leaders to negotiate. The party finds out that the reason of the hostility is the theft of the crystal souls by the Empire. The party retrieves the crystal souls, and in turn the Vahnatai join the Avernites in opposition against the Empire. With their support, the Avernites turn the tables on the Empire and successfully repel the invasion.

Starting in Avernum 2, the player may choose to have Nephilim and Slithzerikai characters in the party, in contrast to the original Avernum that allowed only human characters.

The game was remade as Avernum 2: Crystal Souls in 2015 for Windows, OS X, and iOS. This remade version is the second remake of Crystal Souls and uses a new game engine.

==== Avernum 3 ====
Screenshot of Avernum 3, showing a party about to leave for the surface.

Avernum 3 takes place ten years after the events of Avernum 2. Avernites have done a lot of preparation and are ready to send a selected few back into the light of the surface. After those selected few vanish, they send a selected few more. While those who emerge are at first stunned by the sheer beauty of the land around them, they also begin to notice that things are not as perfect as they seem. The slimes encountered are only the first part of what becomes a series of monsters and terrible occurrences that are blighting the Empire and laying it to waste. When scouting the land, as per orders from the Avernite government, the player is asked by the Empire to help save the surface from its blight. Adventurers must bring the Avernites and the Empire together to find the cause of the destruction.

The game was remade as Avernum 3: Ruined World in 2018 for Windows, macOS, and iOS. This remade version is the second remake of Ruined World and uses a new game engine.

=== Blades of Avernum ===
Blades of Avernum is a non-canon installment in the Avernum series, released in June 2004. It comes with four pre-installed scenarios, three of which are only available after game purchase. Its most notable feature is a free scenario creation kit that can be downloaded and used to make scenarios that can be distributed to other players. It has come under fire for being "too complex" in comparison to Blades of Exile, its predecessor, which used a very simple instruction list instead of a script system. On the other hand, it has also been praised for allowing many new possibilities using said script system, which couldn't be achieved with the Blades of Exile system.

Spiderweb Software has released the source code for the editor and allows others to make enhanced versions and add-ons, which a number of players have done. The most notable adaptation of the editor is a 3D editor, which allows the user to view and edit a project using axonometric in-game view.

=== Avernum: Second Trilogy ===
==== Avernum IV ====
Avernum IV (also known as Avernum 4) was released for Macintosh in late 2005 and released for Windows on March 2, 2006. It makes use of the Geneforge engine and merges it with the Avernum engine; essentially this means that the gameplay is entirely turn-based, but uses the Geneforge point-and-click navigation and user interfaces. In addition, there is a large amount of new art in order to bring the world of Avernum to life within the reworked Geneforge engine.

Avernum 4 takes place long after the other games – one of the dialogue options remarks that the events of the third game happened "before we were even born". Weird monsters have been appearing in the underworld, and three powerful shades have been attacking people in the cities. A group of assassins also appears and targets all travellers and especially player characters. The player takes charge of a group of heroes which will, in the end, determine the fate of all of Avernum.

The game was remade as Avernum 4: Greed and Glory in 2025. This remade version is the first remake of Avernum IV and uses a new game engine.

==== Avernum V ====
Gameplay from Avernum 5 showing a party preparing to leave a city.

On November 12, 2007 Spiderweb Software released Avernum V (also known as Avernum 5) for Macintosh, followed by the Windows version on February 16, 2008. The game utilizes the same game engine as its predecessor, but differs greatly in its plot element. Instead of being hired by Avernum (as with all other chapters in the series), the party of adventurers in the story fulfill the bidding of the Empire. The player controlling the party must hunt down the assassin Dorikas while dealing with numerous other obstacles such as spies and betrayal. Meanwhile, characters in the party are trained in over fifty spells and battle disciplines. Battle disciplines are applied on an axonometric game grid sharing an interface with Avernum 4.

==== Avernum VI ====
Avernum VI (also known as Avernum 6) was released late 2009 for the Macintosh and early March 2010 for Windows and was developed on a low budget. In the time since the last game, Avernum has been struck by several disasters. The mushrooms which provide most of Avernum's food have been infected with a disease causing them to become poisonous and die, and the Slithzerikai horde has attacked. The player controls a group of Avernite soldiers whose job is to save Avernum.

== Remade Series ==
Starting in 2011, the Avernum series was remade, with each remade game featuring an enhanced game engine and expanded content.

=== Avernum: Escape from the Pit ===
The first remade game, which follows the same plot as Avernum and Exile: Escape from the Pit, was released on December 14, 2011.

=== Avernum 2: Crystal Souls ===
The second remade game, based on Avernum 2 and Exile II: Crystal Souls, was released on January 14, 2015.

=== Avernum 3: Ruined World ===
The third remade game, based on Avernum 3 and Exile III: Ruined World, was released on January 31, 2018.

=== Avernum 4: Greed and Glory ===
The fourth remade game, based on Avernum IV, was released on October 22, 2025.

== Reception ==
Reception

Review scores
Publication	Score
GameZone	5.0/10 on Avernum 1 7.4/10 on Avernum IV 5.9/10 on Avernum V
PC Gamer (US)	17% on Avernum 1; 73% on Avernum VI
Just RPG	88% on Avernum 3
GameTunnel	7/10 on Avernum 4 9/10 on Blades of Avernum
RPGWatch	4/5 on Avernum V
ApertureGames	7/10 on Avernum 1
Applelinks	4/5 on Avernum V
Inside Mac Games	6/10 on Blades of Avernum; 8/10 on Avernum: Escape from the Pit
Macworld	4/5 on Avernum IV
Impulse Gamer	8/10 on Avernum: Escape from the Pit
Giochi per il mio computer	5/10 on Avernum IV

The original titles in the Avernum series have frequently been met with praise for the depth of their storytelling and gameplay, while simultaneously receiving criticism for the use of crude graphics and game engines and lack of better sound effects. A review of the original Avernum in July 2000 noted that it was "not even in the same league as current RPG/RTS products [in] the market".

Newer games in the series, however, were praised for having much higher production values. Several years later, in August 2002, the Just RPG review of sequel Avernum 3 reached a completely different conclusion. Scoring the game as an 88%, the review concluded, "Bottom line? Graphics don't make the game. Despite lack of animation and 32-bit graphics, this is a top-notch RPG that I would love to see more of in today's market.". A June 2006 review at Game Tunnel for Avernum 4 commented that "lots of thought [was] given to the environment and background story, and the game itself seems very solid."

Reaction to the final game of the original series, Avernum 6, was reasonably positive and praised the storyline. IndieRPGs.com said it was "a game that lives and dies by the strength of its writing, and the writing is pretty good", while noting that "it lacks a certain level of polish". IT Reviews commented, "As long as you can get past the aesthetics, Avernum 6 is a compelling slice of old school role-playing, which is well designed on the character development and combat fronts." It was also nominated and became the runner-up on "Independent RPG of the Year" by GameBanshee.

The games have received very varying scores throughout the series, often the tipping point being the "inadequate" graphics. However, most reviews admitted to good storytelling and well-presented RPG gameplay elements, noting that the game is recognisable for its gameplay value.

The Avernum series was remade starting in the early 2010s, and the ground-up rewrites Avernum: Escape from the Pit and Avernum 2: Crystal Souls have received a largely positive critical reception. For example, GameBanshee wrote, "Fans looking to get into the Avernum series will do very well with Escape from the Pit, and while the improvements beyond the game engine and visuals are relatively modest, there's still a lot to enjoy even if you've played through the game once before already."
