= Mohawk Games =

American video game developer

- Industry: Video games
- Founded: 2013; 13 years ago
- Founders: Soren Johnson; Dorian Newcomb
- Headquarters: Washington DC, United States
- Key people: Leyla Johnson (CEO)
- Products: Video games
- Website: mohawkgames.com

Mohawk Games is an American video game developer based in Baltimore, Maryland, known for releasing the strategy video games Offworld Trading Company and Old World.

== History ==
Mohawk games was co-founded in 2013 by Firaxis veterans Soren Johnson and Dorian Newcomb. The studio is based in Hunt Valley, Maryland, home to several video game studios that could trace their lineage back to Microprose from the 1980s, a studio that itself had veterans who formed Firaxis. The studio was founded as part of the Stardock strategic investment fund to promote strategy game development. According to later President Leyla Johnson, "the small studio once comprised solely white men" early in its foundation, as part of an industry trend in the early 2010s.

The studio's first effort was an economic real-time strategy game called Offworld Trading Company, for the PC. Johnson has said that he prefers developing for the PC because of the lack of gatekeepers. The game was published by Stardock Entertainment. Offworld Trading Company featured music from Grammy-award-winning composer Christopher Tin, an old roommate of Soren Johnson who also provided the soundtrack for Civilization IV. Offworld Trading Company entered Steam's Early Access program in 2015, and was eventually released in 2016. After its launch, Brad Wardell, who has served as President stepped down and promoted Dorian Newcomb as President.

In 2018, Mohawk announced a new strategy game published by Starbreeze called 10 Crowns, a title which they later changed to Old World. Mohawk used Old World as an opportunity to improve on Johnson's work on Civilization IV, focusing on AI and diplomacy that would feel more immersive and less like a game. In 2019, their Sweden-based publisher encountered financial issues, and sold the rights to Mohawk's upcoming game back to them. Soren Johnson stepped down as CEO and was succeeded by Leyla Johnson, who prioritized greater gender equity at the studio and in the broader game industry. By 2020, the studio had announced that it had successfully diversified their team and published a code of conduct.

== Games developed ==
Year	Title	Platform(s)
2016	Offworld Trading Company	Windows, macOS
2021	Old World	Windows, macOS, Linux
