= Christopher Tin =

American composer (born 1976)

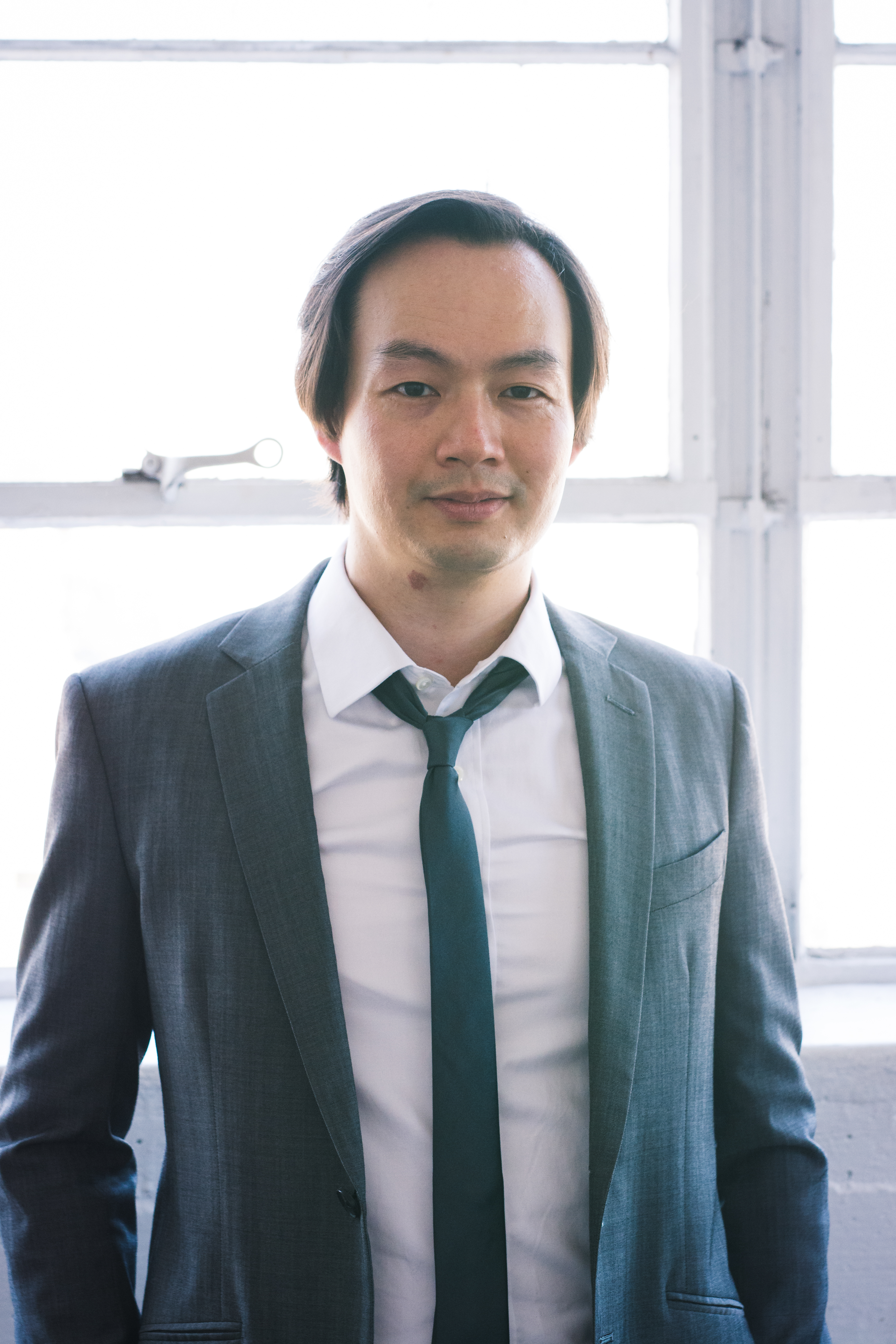
- Tin in 2016

Background information
- Born: Christopher Chiyan Tin; May 21, 1976 (age 50); Palo Alto, California, U.S.
- Genres: Classical; Choral; Crossover; Orchestral; Soundtrack
- Occupations: Composer; conductor; music arranger; record producer
- Years active: 2000–present
- Labels: Decca Gold; Decca Classics; Universal Music Group
- Spouse: Dyna Kau (m. 2013)
- Website: christophertin.com

Chinese name
- Chinese: 田志仁
Transcriptions
Standard Mandarin
- Hanyu Pinyin: Tián Zhìrén
- Wade–Giles: Tien Chih-jen
Yue: Cantonese
- Yale Romanization: Tin^{4} Ji^{3} Yan^{4}
- Jyutping: Tin^{4} Zi^{3} Jan^{4}

Christopher Chiyan Tin (born May 21, 1976) is an American composer and conductor. His work is primarily orchestral and choral, often with a world music influence. He is a two-time Grammy Award winner, and has won various awards for his work in video game soundtracks and studio albums.

Tin is best known for his work on title themes for the Civilization video game series, specifically the main theme "Baba Yetu" from the video game Civilization IV, which, at the 53rd Annual Grammy Awards in 2011, became the first piece of video game music to win a Grammy Award. This Grammy win has been considered a significant milestone for the critical acceptance of music from video games, and following this win the Recording Academy retitled their visual media categories to become more inclusive of video game soundtracks, before eventually creating a dedicated Grammy Award for Best Score Soundtrack for Video Games and Other Interactive Media in 2022.

== Early life and education ==
Tin was born May 21, 1976 in Palo Alto, California, to immigrant parents from Hong Kong. He attended Stanford University, and had a brief period as an exchange student at the University of Oxford. He double majored in music composition and English literature, and minored in art history. In his time at university, he supplemented his studies by participating in various jazz, musical theatre, and world music student groups. Tin graduated in 1998, receiving a Bachelor of Arts degree with honors, and continued to study at Stanford, receiving a Master of Arts in Interdisciplinary Studies in Humanities, with an emphasis in film studies, in 1999.

In 1999, Tin was admitted to the Royal College of Music's Master of Music in Composition for Screen program, and simultaneously received a Fulbright Scholarship, which was the first to be awarded for film scoring. There, he studied composition with Joseph Horovitz, orchestration with Julian Anderson, and conducting with Neil Thomson. He graduated with Distinction and won the Joseph Horovitz composition prize as the student with the highest overall marks in his course.

== Career ==
=== Early career (2000–2005) ===
While a student at the Royal College of Music, Tin completed his first commission, the string quartet Lacrymosa, for the U.S. Embassy in London. Tin found his first professional employment as a staff arranger for Silva Screen Records, where his job was to transcribe orchestral film scores (by John Williams, James Horner, John Barry, and others) by ear so they could be re-recorded by live orchestra for album release.

In 2000, Tin moved to Los Angeles and continued to arrange scores for Silva Screen Records while searching for more permanent employment. His first internship was with Hans Zimmer. Tin found freelance work with composers Joel McNeely, who hired him to make synthesized mockups of his film scores for a series of Disney films, and John Ottman, who gave him incidental music to write for X2: X-Men United. He also worked for record producer Michael Brook, who took him to India on tour as a keyboardist.

In 2003, Tin participated in the Sundance Institute Film Music Lab, where he met jazz pianist Billy Childs. Childs referred Tin for his first composing job, which was scoring a documentary for New York Times Television. This led to a period of writing music for New York-based documentary filmmakers (notably Deborah Dickson) and advertising clients (notably Puma).

=== Baba Yetu (2005) ===
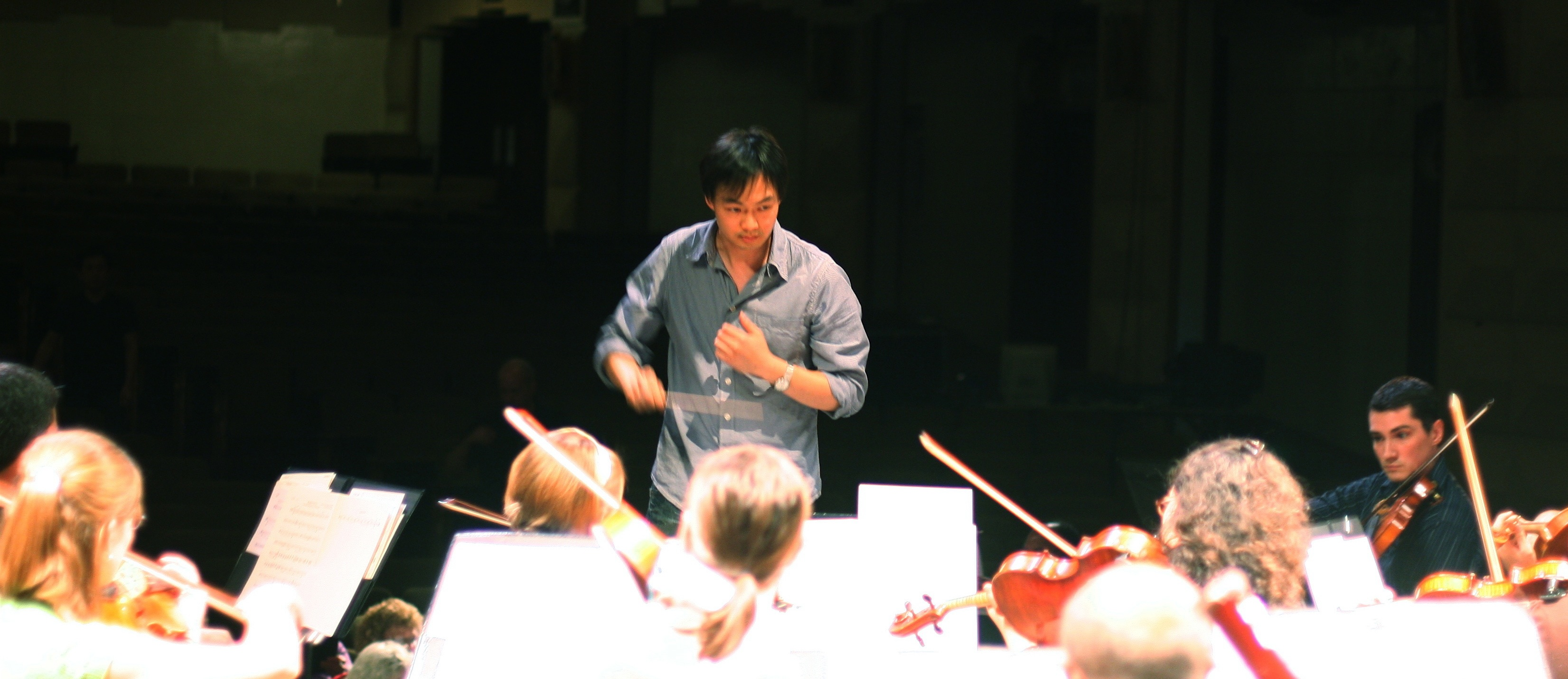
Christopher Tin rehearses the Golden State Pops Orchestra, 2011

Tin's biggest break came in 2005, when video game designer Soren Johnson, Tin's former roommate at Stanford, asked him to compose the theme song for Civilization IV. In response, Tin composed "Baba Yetu" for the main theme, a choral, Swahili version of the Lord's Prayer recorded by his former a cappella group, Stanford Talisman. The song was widely praised, with over 20 reviewers of the game singling out the theme on game review websites such as IGN and GameSpy. The song's first live performance was on September 21, 2006, at the Hollywood Bowl as part of a Video Games Live concert, where it featured Stanford Talisman and was conducted by Jack Wall.

"Baba Yetu" has achieved popularity outside the video game industry, being performed at various venues and events around the world. Some venues have included Carnegie Hall, Lincoln Center, Kennedy Center, and the Dubai Fountain. It has also been performed during multiple events at the United Nations. On August 6, 2019, it was played at the signing of the Maputo Accord, which brought an end to the RENAMO insurgency in Mozambique.

Many notable ensembles have performed "Baba Yetu", including the Royal Philharmonic Orchestra, Metropole Orchestra, Welsh National Opera, National Symphony Orchestra, and the US Navy Band. Various YouTube artists, including Peter Hollens, Maytree, and Alex Boye and the BYU Men's Chorus have also performed the song. It is a popular competition piece, as in 2014 the Welsh choir Côr CF1 won BBC Radio 3's Choir of the Year with their performance, and in 2018 two separate contestants competed with "Baba Yetu" on the same season of America's Got Talent, being the Angel City Chorale, who were awarded the Golden Buzzer by Olivia Munn, and Zurcaroh, who reached the finals with an acrobatic dance performance to the song. It was also featured on the TV show Jeopardy!, with the clue "Choir staple 'Baba Yetu' means "Our Father" in Swahili and is basically this prayer."

"Baba Yetu" is one of the most decorated pieces of video game music, holding the distinction of being the first piece of music written for a video game to be both nominated for, and win, a Grammy Award (at the 53rd Annual Grammy Awards in the "Best Instrumental Arrangement Accompanying Vocalist(s)" category). Additionally, it won Tin two Game Audio Network Guild Awards in 2006, as well as winning him two awards in the 10th Annual Independent Music Awards ("Best Song Used in Film/TV/Multimedia" and "Best World Beat Song"). It also entered Tin into the Guinness Book of World Records as the composer of the first video game theme to win a Grammy Award.

=== Calling All Dawns (2009–2014) ===
In 2009, Tin released his classical crossover album Calling All Dawns. The album is a song-cycle in three uninterrupted movements: Day, Night, and Dawn (corresponding to life, death, and rebirth). The twelve songs are sung in twelve languages, including Swahili, Polish, French, Persian, and Māori. The lyrics are taken from diverse sources, including the Torah, the Bhagavad Gita, Persian and Japanese poetry, and lyrics by contemporary writers. Appropriate vocal traditions are used in the performance of each song, and include African gospel, Beijing opera, medieval chants, and Irish keening.

The album won two Grammys in the 53rd Grammy Awards for Best Classical Crossover Album and Best Instrumental Arrangement Accompanying Vocalist(s) for the song "Baba Yetu", and was nominated for the 'Contemporary Classical Album' category at the 10th Annual Independent Music Awards. It features performances by the Royal Philharmonic Orchestra (conducted by Lucas Richman), Soweto Gospel Choir, Lia, Aoi Tada, Kaori Omura (大村香織), Jia Ruhan, Dulce Pontes, Anonymous 4, Frederica von Stade, Sussan Deyhim, Stanford Talisman, and On Ensemble.

Tin had never intended the work to be performed live, however, many ensembles have performed it in this manner. The first concert was given by Derek Machan and the Waterford Union High School chorus in Waterford, Wisconsin. Subsequently, on April 7, 2013, New York-based concert promoters Distinguished Concerts International New York did the first of multiple large-scale productions at the Avery Fisher Hall at Lincoln Center, conducted by Jonathan Griffith and featuring original album artists Anonymous 4, Ron Ragin, Shayok Misha Chowdhury and Roopa Mahadevan. On July 19, 2016, the Royal Philharmonic Orchestra performed excerpts with the combined Angel City Chorale, Prima Vocal Ensemble and Lucis choirs at Cadogan Hall in London. On July 5, 2017, at the 70th Anniversary of the Llangollen International Musical Eisteddfod, Tin himself conducted the entire work with the Welsh National Opera Orchestra and a group of international soloists, including Elin Manahan Thomas, Nathalie Pires, Joel Virgel, and Nominjin, and a mass choir made up of singers from Wales, South Africa, Taiwan, and the United States. The concert was filmed and subsequently broadcast on Welsh television station S4C.

=== The Drop That Contained the Sea (2014–2016) ===
Tin's second album, titled The Drop That Contained the Sea, premiered live at Carnegie Hall on April 13, 2014. It was performed by a combined chorus of multiple singing groups from around the United States, Canada, and England, as part of an all-Tin concert produced by Distinguished Concerts International New York. It consists of ten songs, each sung in a different language, beginning with Proto-Indo-European and including Bulgarian, Turkish, Mongolian, Xhosa, Ancient Greek and Sanskrit. The song cycle follows the water cycle much like Calling All Dawns followed the day and night cycle.

The album was recorded at Abbey Road Studios with Tin conducting the Royal Philharmonic Orchestra, and features guest performances by the Soweto Gospel Choir, Le Mystère des Voix Bulgares, Kardeş Türküler, Dulce Pontes, Nominjin, Roopa Mahadevan, Anonymous 4, the Angel City Chorale, and Norwegian chamber choir Schola Cantorum. Upon release, it achieved #1 status on the Billboard Classical Charts.

Tin centered his first tour around the work, conducting it in three cities in the UK. The European premiere was given on July 16, 2016, at the Barbican in York, with the Mowbray Orchestra and combined Angel City Chorale and Prima Vocal Ensemble choirs, followed by concerts at the Harrogate Music Festival, and in London with the Royal Philharmonic Orchestra.

=== Sogno di Volare (2016) ===
Tin returned to the Civilization franchise to compose the main theme for Civilization VI, a choral anthem called "Sogno di Volare" (The Dream of Flight). The text for the song is commonly, yet erroneously, attributed to Leonardo da Vinci's writings on flight. Tin explained in a statement that he hoped the piece would capture the "essence of exploration; both the physical exploration of seeking new lands, but also the mental exploration of expanding the frontiers of science and philosophy." The piece was given its world premiere in concert on July 19, 2016, at London's Cadogan Hall, conducted by Tin and performed by the Royal Philharmonic Orchestra, Angel City Chorale, Lucis and Prima Vocal Ensemble combined choirs.

=== To Shiver the Sky (2020) ===
Tin released his third album, To Shiver the Sky, in August 2020 on the Decca Gold label. Following in the same style as his previous albums, the eleven tracks have lyrics in multiple languages based on existing texts. The album has a theme of the history of aviation, expanding from "Sogno di Volare". It was funded through Kickstarter in 2018, becoming the highest funded classical music project on Kickstarter.

The album, like The Drop That Contained the Sea, was recorded at Abbey Road Studios, with Tin conducting the Royal Philharmonic Orchestra, and features guest performances by Danielle de Niese, Pene Pati, ModernMedieval Voices, Anna Lapwood, the Pembroke College Girls' Choir, the Royal Opera Chorus, and The Assembly.

The initial premiere was postponed due to the COVID-19 pandemic. To Shiver the Sky was premiered live on May 15, 2022, at The Anthem in Washington, D.C. The premiere featured the United States Air Force Band, Choral Arts Society of Washington, and ModernMedieval.

=== The Lost Birds (2022) ===
Tin’s fourth album, titled The Lost Birds, was released on September 30, 2022, on the Decca Classics label, debuting at No. 2 on the Billboard Classical Charts. It was subsequently nominated for a Grammy Award for Best Classical Compendium. The album is a musical memorial to bird species driven to extinction by humankind and a celebration of their beauty, while also presenting a warning about humanity's own tenuous existence on the planet. It consists of twelve movements, ten of which use texts by poets Emily Dickinson, Sara Teasdale, Edna St. Vincent Millay, and Cristina Rossetti, along with two purely instrumental tracks. Unlike Tin’s previous works, all movements of the piece are sung in English. The album was funded once again via Kickstarter, and Tin broke his own record for highest funded classical music project on the platform.

The Lost Birds features popular British ensemble VOCES8 and Tin’s longtime collaborators the Royal Philharmonic Orchestra. It was recorded in two parts; the vocal elements of the album were recorded first at the VOCES8 Centre, conducted by Barnaby Smith, while the instrumental elements were recorded at Abbey Road Studios, conducted by Tin. This allowed better balance between the choir and the orchestra.

The Lost Birds was premiered virtually by VOCES8 as part of their 'LIVE from London' series on October 15, 2022, featuring The VOCES8 Foundation Choir and Orchestra, with Barnaby Smith conducting. The work’s live premiere occurred on February 25, 2023, at Stanford University, with Tin conducting VOCES8 and the VOCES8 Foundation Scholars, and featuring a reduced chamber orchestration performed by the Friction Quartet and pianist Keisuke Nakagoshi.

The Lost Birds was performed as an Anchor Performance in the 2025 Ear Taxi Festival presented by New Music Chicago on October 11, 2025. The piece was performed by DePaul Ensemble 20+ and the William Ferris Chorale.

=== Turandot (2024) ===
Tin's foray into opera came about when director Francesca Zambello, Artistic Director of Washington National Opera, heard his music coming from her teenage son's bedroom. Confused as to why her son was listening to classical music, she discovered that he had in fact been playing Civilization VI, which features Tin's piece "Sogno di Volare". She then reached out to Tin, and invited him to meet with her in San Francisco.

The resulting commission was to compose a new ending to Giacomo Puccini's opera Turandot, which was left unfinished upon his death in 1924. Zambello paired Tin up with playwright Susan Soon He Stanton, who wrote a new libretto to replace the ending written by Giuseppe Adami and Renato Simoni.

Tin and Stanton's new ending premiered at the Kennedy Center on May 11, 2024, and sold out its entire run prior to opening night. The reviews were very positive: Michael Andor Brodeur of The Washington Post called the production 'refreshing' and declared "Even without the new ending — and Tin's splendid musical additions, which draw sensibly from Puccini's score while applying an entirely new emotional finish — Zambello's "Turandot" crackles with fresh energy". Heidi Waleson of The Wall Street Journal wrote that the new ending "fits the opera neatly. Its sound and attitude, while contemporary, grow organically from Puccini’s original, like a savvy modern addition on a historic building."

=== Live Gloriously (2024) ===
Tin once again returned to the Civilization franchise to compose the main theme for Civilization VII, a choral anthem called "Live Gloriously". The text for the song is based on four famous historical texts: the Iliad, Beowulf, the Popol Vuh and the Ramayana in their original native languages. Tin explained in a blog that he was facing pressure to compose the main theme of Civilization VII until he found inspiration from a quote in the Iliad. The piece was given its world premiere at The Game Awards 2024, conducted by Lorne Balfe and performed by The Game Awards Orchestra, including an appearance by Pedro Eustache.

== Collaborative projects ==
In 2009, Tin and multi-instrumentalist and producer Shoji Kameda formed a Los Angeles-based production duo, Stereo Alchemy. Their debut album God of Love was released on Valentine's Day, February 14, 2012. It featured a variety of Renaissance and Romantic era poems (from Thomas Carew, Christina Rossetti, and John Donne, among others) reinvented as lyrics for trip hop and synth pop songs.

In 2015, Tin composed the orchestral arrangements for trance artist BT's remix album Electronic Opus.

In 2017, Tin announced an EDM-meets-orchestra collaboration with Australian DJ TyDi called Collide. Their first single "Closing In", featuring vocals by Dia Frampton, was released October 6, 2017.

Tin collaborated with Lang Lang on the 2016 release of a piano and orchestra suite of music from Crouching Tiger, Hidden Dragon. Additionally, Tin has collaborated with Danny Elfman and Alan Menken.

Tin has received commissions by Stratus Chamber Orchestra, Bangor Symphony Orchestra, Orchestra at St. Matthew's and ISCMS Festival. He also co-created the startup sound for the original Microsoft Surface computing platform.

Tin arranged a number of jazz tunes for 2018 film Crazy Rich Asians, with one being based on the Chinese melody "When Will You Return?". This arrangement was chosen by director Jon M. Chu and Warner Brothers to open the film.

Tin's other film credits include writing additional music for Sausage Party (2016), Suddenly Seventeen (2016), Tess (2016), Dante's Inferno: An Animated Epic (2010), Dead Space: Aftermath (2011), Hoodwinked Too! Hood vs. Evil (2011) and X2: X-Men United (2003).

== Television appearances ==
Tin was a judge on the 2017 season of the Welsh TV show Côr Cymru, a singing competition for amateur choirs airing on Welsh-language channel S4C.

== Other positions ==
Tin is Honorary Artistic Director of the United Nations Chamber Music Society, Honorary President of the International Choral Festival Wales, and is a patron of El Sistema France. He is also an honorary board member of the Chinese American Museum DC.

== Personal life ==
Tin married Dyna Kau in 2013 and they have a daughter together, Penelope Rose, who was born in 2018.

== Awards ==
=== Grammy Awards ===
Year	Category	Work	Result	Ref
2023	Best Score Soundtrack for Video Games and Other Interactive Media	Old World	Won	
2023	Best Classical Compendium	The Lost Birds	Nominated	
2011	Best Classical Crossover Album	Calling All Dawns	Won	
2011	Best Instrumental Arrangement With Vocalist(s)	Baba Yetu	Won	

=== Video game industry awards ===
Year	Award	Category	Work	Result	Ref
2017	Game Audio Network Guild	Best Original Vocal Song – Choral	Sogno di Volare	Nominated	
2017	Game Audio Network Guild	Music of the Year	Civilization VI	Nominated	
2017	Movie Music UK Award	Best Video Game Score	Civilization VI	Won	
2017	NAVGTR Award	Best Song, Original or Adapted	Sogno di Volare	Nominated	
2016	Guinness Book of World Records	First Video Game Theme to Win a Grammy	Baba Yetu	Won	
2015	VGMO Award	Album of the Year	The Drop That Contained the Sea	Won	
2007	Game Audio Network Guild	Best Arrangement of a Non-Original Score	Pirates of the Caribbean Online	Nominated	
2006	Game Audio Network Guild	Best Original Vocal Song – Choral	Baba Yetu	Won	
2006	Game Audio Network Guild	Rookie of the Year	Christopher Tin	Won	
2006	GameSpy	Best Music	Civilization IV	Honorable Mention	

=== Songwriting awards ===
Year	Award	Category	Work	Result	Ref
2015	John Lennon Songwriting Contest	World	Iza Ngomso	Won	
2015	John Lennon Songwriting Contest	Lennon Award – World	Iza Ngomso	Won	
2015	International Songwriting Contest	World Music Category	Iza Ngomso	1st place	
2015	Independent Music Award	Vox Pop Contemporary Classical Album	Iza Ngomso	Won	
2015	Independent Music Award	Best Contemporary Classical Album	The Drop That Contained the Sea	Nominated	
2015	Independent Music Award	Best World Beat Song	Waloyo Yamoni	Nominated	
2014	USA Songwriting Competition	Best World Music Song	Iza Ngomso	Won	
2011	Independent Music Award	Best World Beat Song	Baba Yetu	Won	
2011	Independent Music Award	Best Song Used in Film/TV/Multimedia	Baba Yetu	Won	
2011	Independent Music Award	Best Contemporary Classical Album	Calling All Dawns	Nominated	
2010	International Songwriting Competition	Best World Music Song	Baba Yetu	1st place	
2010	John Lennon Songwriting Contest	Best World Music Song	Baba Yetu	Finalist	
2010	USA Songwriting Competition	Best World Music Song	Baba Yetu	Nominated	

== Concert works ==
Tin's concert works are predominantly choral and orchestral, and often feature languages rarely used in the realm of classical music.

=== Opera ===
- (2024) Turandot (new ending)

=== Song cycles ===
- (2009) Calling All Dawns
- (2014) The Drop That Contained the Sea
- (2020) To Shiver the Sky
- (2022) The Lost Birds

=== Choral works with orchestra ===
- (2005) Baba Yetu
- (2009) Kia Hora Te Marino
- (2009) Mado Kara Mieru
- (2013) Temen Oblak
- (2013) Iza Ngomso
- (2016) Sogno di Volare
- (2017) Silver Wing
- (2017) Adain Can
- (2024) Live Gloriously

=== Vocal solo with orchestra ===
- (2013) Passou o Verao
- (2020) Courage

=== Orchestra with soloist(s) ===
- (2014) Shinobu vs. Ghost Warrior

=== Chamber ===
- (1999) Lacrymosa (string quartet)

=== Piano solo ===
- (2009) Nocturne No. 2

== Scores for video games ==
- (2005) Civilization IV
- (2012) Karateka
- (2016) Offworld Trading Company
- (2016) Civilization VI
- (2018) Rise of Kingdoms
- (2019) Splitgate
- (2021) Old World
- (2025) Civilization VII
