= Distinguished Concerts International New York =

Music entertainment production company

Distinguished Concerts International New York (DCINY) is a music entertainment production company that stages concerts for individual performers and performing groups in music venues such as Carnegie Hall and Lincoln Center in New York City, and Walt Disney Concert Hall in Los Angeles, California. Performance repertoire ranges from Handel’s Messiah to contemporary a cappella. DCINY was founded by Iris Derke and Jonathan Griffith in 2007 and is currently headquartered in New York City.

== History ==
DCINY produced its first concert on January 21, 2008, at Carnegie Hall. As of 2019, over 70,000 performers representing 47 countries and all 50 U.S. states have participated in a DCINY production. Since the inception of the company, DCINY has produced 17 world premieres and over 200 concerts.

The company’s composer-in-residence program has commissioned and staged world premieres for a number of contemporary works including Karl Jenkins: The Peacemakers, Christopher Tin: The Drop that Contained the Sea, Eric Whitacre: Animal Crackers, Vol. II, Eric Whitacre: The City and The Sea, Mark Hayes: The American Spirit, Paul Mealor: Jubilate Deo, Mark Hayes: Requiem, Cristian Grases: For Treble Voices, Daniel Elder: World Without End, Martín Palmeri: Tango Credo, Mortals & Angels: A Bluegrass Te Deum.

The for-profit company is also responsible for bringing significant international choral works to the United States market, including Sir Karl Jenkins: Cantata Memoria, Karl Jenkins: Songs of the Earth, Karl Jenkins: Stabat Mater, Burge: Mass for Prisoners of Conscience. Other composers that DCINY has presented include Stephen Schwartz, Deke Sharon, Ola Gjeilo, Howard Goodall, Pepper Choplin, Tim Seelig and Morten Lauridsen, as well as traditional repertoire such as Handel’s Messiah and Brahms' Requiem.
