= Fall From Heaven II =

- Developer: Fall From Heaven Group
- Platform: Windows
- Release: 2008

Fall From Heaven II is a 2008 video game mod created for Civilization IV, developed by the Fall From Heaven Group led by Derek Paxton. The sequel to the 2006 mod Fall From Heaven for the same game, the mod turns the game into a dark fantasy one. It introduces a new tech tree, units, factions, and more. The player can choose a religion to align with, granting access to good or evil powers. The mod was praised by critics for its depth and attention to detail.

== Reception ==
PC Zone said that "mods [...] don't come much more comprehensive than this", recommending it to players. Pelit scored the game a 92/100. The game was also covered in PC Mania.

== Legacy ==
A standalone sequel entitled Fall From Heaven Tactics was planned, but later cancelled after failing to find financing.
