= Stanford Talisman =

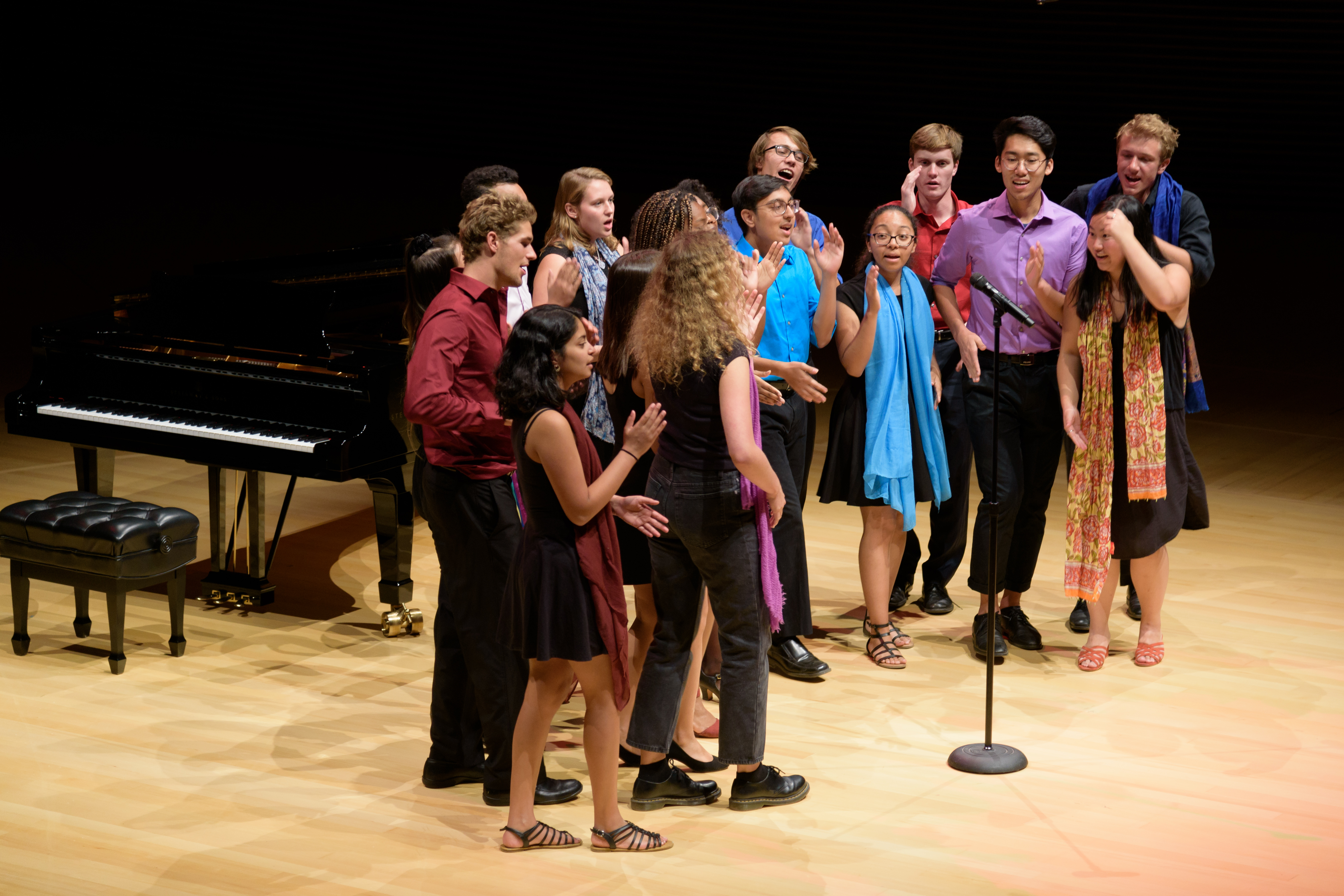
- Stanford Talisman in 2019

Background information
- Origin: Stanford, California, U.S.
- Genres: A Cappella
- Years active: 1990—present
- Website: www.stanfordtalisman.com

Stanford Talisman is a student a cappella group at Stanford University, dedicated to sharing stories through music.

Started in 1990 by Stanford student Joseph Pigato, their roots are in music from South Africa and the African diaspora, but they have since broadened their horizons to include music from all over the world. They perform not only locally in the greater San Francisco Bay Area but also around the world. Their most recent tour was to Panama in spring of 2026. The group has also traveled to South Africa (2016), Hawai'i (2018), India (2019), and Thailand (2023). The group won the 1997 ICCA competition and notable performances include the 1996 Olympic Games, the White House, with 10-time Grammy award winner Bobby McFerrin in 2005 and 2019, with Seal in 2009, with Joan Baez in 2019, annually at Stanford Graduation Baccalaureate, and their sold-out 25th Anniversary Show in Bing Concert Hall in 2015.

Their musical repertoire includes their arrangements of "One by One" by Lebo M., "Lift Ev'ry Voice" (the Black national anthem), "Baba Yetu" by Talisman alumni Christopher Tin (a song featured in the video game Civilization IV), Sweet Honey in the Rock's "Wanting Memories," a compilation of the two songs "Hawai'i '78" and "E Ala E"] performed by Israel Kamakawiwo'ole, and the traditional spiritual "Amazing Grace."

Talisman has released eight full-length albums as well as a 10-year anniversary compilation entitled "Shine," and a 20-year compilation, "Twenty," and two five-song EPs. The group was featured on the 1997 Best of Collegiate A Cappella compilation, and has received recognition from CARA, most recently in 2004, winning "Mixed-Group Album of the Year" for Watch Me Fly.

== History ==
From founder Joe Pigato at Talisman's 25th Anniversary Show:

"October 1989 - I was a sophomore here at Stanford and I had just started my second year and was not singing again, though I'd been singing most of my life. A good friend came up from my hometown and was lamenting the fact that I wouldn't be singing again. He said, 'Well, why don't you start your own group?' And I thought, 'Well, bit of work, my friend Ben [is] a super excitable guy - it's going to take a bit of work to do.'

I went home from that breakfast and my ideas was that I wanted to do world music because that's what's I grew up listening to and that's what I love, and as wonderful as college a cappella is, it wasn't the style or what I wanted to sing. So I went home, I jotted down a few songs - I wasn't going to start the group, I just jotted down a few songs, what I thought we might sing, what our name might be, maybe where we'd practice, maybe when we'd practice, and uh, pretty soon I realized I was on my way to doing this. I sat back and I thought, 'World music - it's not the thing that brings in the audience, I don't know if anyone's going to want to sing this.' But I decided on January 15th, 1990 at Braun room 105, I was going to have my first auditions.

I put 2,000 fliers up around campus talking about singing music with stories from around the world. I was sure no one was going to come to our audition. I woke up with an awful, awful migraine. My accompanist couldn't come and play scales. I thought, "Maybe this isn't meant to be." I went over to Braun 105, there was a big crowd outside the room, and I had already messed up scheduling a couple times. I thought maybe the Ram's Head Musical had got the room for auditions, and now I'm just a wreck. I walk up, there's a crowd, I'm like, 'So what is this for?' Someone looks and says 'It's for Talisman?' And I panicked, and I said, 'Um, great. Well, good luck with that.' I walked away to the Tresidder Parking Lot and was justing thinking, 'Okay, here.' I was humming this song, N'kayalamakawa, this African song that I loved. I was thinking about the music that I wanted to sing, the stories and music from around the world. I thought, 'I know this music can exist on campus. If I can just find people who would sing this, we could do something big.' I looked back at Braun and I thought, 'There are those people.'

So I walked back, I said 'Did you say Talisman?' and he said 'Talisman!', and they were there. From that group, we found 15 fantastic singers. For the next 25 years, every year we have 5 or 10 new singers who have wonderful heart, wonderful vision, who want to bring the stories of the world to express them, and we've now been able to bring those people together for 25 years."

== Discography ==
- No Murmur, No Zealots (1992)
- Tonic Rhythms (1994)
- After Silence (1996)
- Anthem (1996), greatest hits album
- Held in Shining (1998)
- Shine (2000), 10-year anniversary album
- Passage (2001)
- Watch Me Fly (2003)
- The Quick Day is Done (2006)
- Twenty (2010), 20-year anniversary album
- Going Home (2011)
- New Crossroads (2012), a joint recording with Peace Africa Children's Ensemble
- Stanford Talisman Live (2020), a compilation of live Talisman performances from 2018 to 2019
- Your Voice, Above the Storm (2020)

=== EPs and other appearances ===
- Featured in "Calling All Dawns", debut Christopher Tin album (2009)
- The Knoll Sessions (2017), a five-song collection recorded at CCRMA at Stanford University in the summer of 2017
- Muliwai (2018), a five-song collection recorded at CCRMA at Stanford University in the summer of 2018

== Awards and nominations ==
Year	Award	Category	Nominee(s)	Result	Ref.
1995	Contemporary A Cappella Recording Awards	Best Mixed Collegiate Soloist	Elena Melendez	Runner-up	
1997	Contemporary A Cappella Recording Awards	Best Mixed Collegiate Album	After Silence	Nominated	
1997	Contemporary A Cappella Recording Awards	Best Mixed Collegiate Song	"The Rainmaker"	Won (tie)	
1999	Contemporary A Cappella Recording Awards	Best Mixed Collegiate Album	Held in Shining	Nominated	
2004	Contemporary A Cappella Recording Awards	Best Mixed Collegiate Album	Watch Me Fly	Won	
2004	Contemporary A Cappella Recording Awards	Best Mixed Collegiate Arrangement	Ron Ragin for "Swing Low"	Runner-up	

=== ICCA results ===
The International Championship of Collegiate A Cappella (ICCA) first judged live a cappella performance competitions in 1996.

Year	Level	Category	Recipient(s)	Result	Citation
1996	West Region Semifinal	Best Group	Talisman a cappella	2nd	
1996	West Region Semifinal	Best Solo	Krystal Evans & Natasha Wilson for "Back To Life"	Won	
1996	West Region Semifinal	Best Arrangement	Christopher Tin for "Homeless"	Won	
1997	West Region Quarterfinal	Best Group	Talisman a cappella	1st	
1997	West Region Semifinal	Best Group	Talisman a cappella	1st	
1997	West Region Semifinal	Best Arrangement	Krystal Evans for "When I Die Tomorrow"	Runner-up	
1997	National Finals	Best Group	Talisman	1st	

== Notable alumni ==
Former members include composer Christopher Tin, class of '98; filmmaker Jeff Orlowski, class of '06; Sameer Gadhia, frontman of the band Young the Giant class of '11; and author Yaa Gyasi, class of '11.

== See also ==
- List of Stanford University a cappella groups
