= Soren Johnson =

American video game designer

- Born: May 23, 1976 (age 50); Olympia, Washington
- Education: Stanford University (BA & MSc.)
- Alma mater: Stanford University
- Occupations: Businessman, game programmer, video game designer
- Years active: 1999–present
- Website: designer-notes.com

Soren Johnson (born May 23, 1976) is an American businessman, game programmer, and video game designer. Johnson's games primarily belong to 4X strategy, with several of his titles having been critically acclaimed. He is best known for his work as a lead designer on Civilization IV, Offworld Trading Company, and Old World. He also worked as a co-lead designer on Civilization III.

In 2013, Johnson founded Mohawk Games, an indie studio in the suburbs of Baltimore, Maryland. They later moved to Alexandria, VA during the 2020 COVID-19 pandemic. The studio brings together people he has worked with in the past with new talent to create new intellectual properties. Their first game, Offworld Trading Company, was released to moderate critical acclaim.

Johnson is known as one of the earliest developers who involved the internet gaming community in game design, testing, and discussion.

== Biography ==
=== Early life ===
Soren Johnson was born in Olympia, Washington to Kenneth and Ruth Johnson. He grew up in Centralia, Washington with his one sibling, Bjorn Johnson, and his cousins Kjell, Erik, and Sonja. At age 13, Johnson was offered the opportunity to attend college early, but his parents thought he would benefit more from being around friends. In hindsight he has stated that he thinks his parents made the right decision.

His first ever notable gaming platform was a Commodore 64, which his parents bought for the family when he was 7 years old. He grew up on mid-80s games and electronic card games of the period, playing various game genres, ranging from board games to strategy to shooter games and racing. Eventually he developed a particular interest in games that involved history and war. In particular, he loved games made by renowned strategy game developer Sid Meier.

=== College and EA ===
Johnson did not play many games in college, choosing to fully embrace the college experience. This resulted in him largely missing the experience of playing Civilization II at that time. Prior to college, Johnson was not aware that computer science consisted of learning programming until he first enrolled at Stanford University, where he started by acquiring a BA in History and eventually an MS in Computer Science.

After college, Johnson started an internship with Electronic Arts when a friend interning there got him an interview. During his internship at EA Johnson worked on Knockout Kings, developing its AI. Johnson returned to school for a semester at Oxford with his college roommate Christopher Tin. Tin would eventually be hired to work on Johnson's game Civilization IV, where he composed the Grammy-winning song Baba Yetu. Johnson played the cello in the Stanford Orchestra and, at one point, traveled to China to perform with his fellow Stanford musicians.

While in college, one of Johnson's friends, Ratha Harntha, won a bet he made with Johnson. The bet required Johnson to shave his head to give himself a mohawk. Johnson cites this as proving that while he might lose some challenges, he will honor his word. It was the inspiration for the name of his current game development studio: Mohawk Games.

=== Firaxis Games ===
After finishing his internship at Electronic Arts, Johnson started employment at Firaxis Games. Johnson followed the Civilization III development externally and jumped at the chance to join his idol Sid Meier. When he joined, much of the previous development team was abandoning Civilization III, which was still early in development. He considered the exodus an opportunity to help Meier and save the franchise from collapse. Johnson joined Firaxis in April 2000 and, along with Jake Solomon, started mid-development on Civilization III with director Sid Meier and designer Jeff Briggs.

Eventually, Johnson became co-lead designer alongside Jeff Briggs. Johnson had a lot of freedom to work on Civilization III and rewrote much of the code from scratch, even with only 16 months left to complete the work before launch. Johnson simplified Civilization III's code base so that many new mechanics could be added without having to keep building on top of the previous game. This was in contrast to how Civilization II's code was on top of the original. Johnson's hardcore resource features in Civilization III created scarcity in economic terms, becoming a catalyst for the diplomacy system. Resource and economic systems would remain a key feature in his later games.

Johnson's central role during Civilization III's development, however, was its artificial intelligence. His success in this field eventually earned him a reputation as one of the best AI developers in the industry. Johnson's ideas were not all well received. One infamous mechanic involved domesticated animals, such as horses, being limited to certain in-game continents - just like in real history. Rather than leaving these poorly received mechanics untouched however, Johnson headed one of the earliest examples of post release support in gaming, using the feedback from the gaming community to further update the game post release. Johnson further highlighted his community support by making the game modder-friendly, designing the AI to adapt and continue to function with changes to game design, even during community modding post-game release. Johnson provided updates and patches to Civilization III for a year after the initial release, spending plenty of time immersed in the game's community, judging and absorbing feedback. Many of the lessons he and the team learned from this exercise were later applied to Civilization IV, leading to great success.

Due to his success in Civilization III, Soren Johnson became the sole lead designer of Civilization IV, once again writing all of the AI. For Civilization IV Johnson brought in Civilization fans and gaming community members to test the game ahead of release, which proved highly effective in making the game stable and balanced before release. This set the precedent for his future development process, and continues to be part of the formula for developing his games.

Johnson also had a considerable role in the development of the main theme music, Baba Yetu, by working with his old classmate and composer, Christopher Tin. Tin and Johnson wanted to capture the essence of the view of Earth from outer space with a musical piece that layered a deeper feeling to the song with extra lyrical meaning. The result was hailed as a masterpiece, being the first video game soundtrack to win a Grammy. Some fans of Civilization IV reportedly ended up leaving the menu screen open to hear the global beat on repeat. When Johnson was asked if Tin was 'as cool in real life as he is on Reddit', he answered simply, "Yes."

=== EA and Zynga ===
On April 17, 2007, it was announced that Johnson had left Firaxis to rejoin Electronic Arts (Maxis) to start mid-development on the genre-bending game based on evolution, Spore. The game simulated 5 phases of evolution, starting the player as single cell and ending as an intergalactic civilization. Johnson was hired to help with the 4th stage: "Civilization," which saw the player's procedural-generated organism begin a primitive civilization on its home world.

Spore would end up disappointing Johnson due to the game's mixed reception from critics and fans. He later attributed its failure to a lack of a clear binding vision across all the teams and the lack of outside player feedback. At EA, Johnson also worked on the design of Dragon Age Legends, a Flash game released for Facebook and Google+ in March 2011. Johnson left EA in September 2011 to join the social network game development company Zynga on an unnamed project that was never published.

=== Mohawk Games ===
In 2013, Johnson co-founded his game development studio, Mohawk Games, in the suburbs of Baltimore, Maryland. Their first video game launched April 28, 2016 titled Offworld Trading Company: an economic real-time strategy game for Microsoft Windows and OS X using an extended and more detailed version of his signature resource system first seen in his earlier Civilization titles. This game would be Soren Johnson's first use of Early Access, making changes based on player feedback, even before its full release.

Offworld Trading Company is a unique game in the genre, as it is an economy-based RTS. Christopher Tin has again contributed musical pieces to the game, including the theme 'Red Planet Nocturne'. Once again, Johnson and Christopher shared ideas on how to make the music sound 'otherworldly,' with Christopher heavily synthesizing his music for the game. Offworld Trading Company would end up being a commercial success, selling over 600,000 copies and achieving a broadly positive critical reception.

After the development of Offworld Trading Company, Mohawk started work on a new historical-based Civilization-inspired strategy game initially called 10 Crowns. Due to financial complications with their publisher Starbreeze Studios, Mohawk Games was offered a deal by Epic Games. The title received a name change to Old World after the switch in publisher, and the game was released on July 1, 2021.

Johnson was a bi-monthly design columnist for Game Developer and is on the advisory board of the Game Developers Conference. He also runs the game design blog Designer Notes and hosts the game designer interview podcast of the same name.

== Works ==
Video games	Year released	Role
Civilization III	2001	Co-Designer
Civilization IV	2005	Lead Designer
Spore	2008	Lead Designer
Dragon Age Legends	2011	Lead Designer
Offworld Trading Company	2016	Lead Designer
Old World	2021	Lead Designer
