= Rhye's and Fall of Civilization =

- Designer: Gabriele "Rhye" Trovato
- Series: Civilization
- Engine: Civilization IV Gamebryo Civ IV: Warlords – 1.487; Civ IV: BTS – 1.187; RAND – 1.27 MP – 1.17
- Platforms: Windows, Mac OS X
- Release: 26 April 2006; 20 years ago
- Genres: Mod, turn-based strategy game, 4X
- Modes: Single-player, multiplayer

Rhye's and Fall of Civilization (RFC) is a "fan scenario" (mod) for the 2005 computer game Sid Meier's Civilization IV. It is an 'Earth simulator' that uses a variety of scripted events to mirror history much more closely than a typical game of Civilization. The name of the scenario references its core feature—the dynamic "Rise and Fall" of civilizations through time—and its creator, Gabriele Trovato, known as "Rhye" in the forums community.

A version of the scenario was included in the second official expansion pack, Civilization IV: Beyond the Sword. It is the second most popular Civilization IV mod (after Fall from Heaven 2) by number of downloads on Civilization Fanatics Center, a large Civilization fan website.

== Development ==
Rhye's and Fall of Civilization built upon Gabriele Trovato's earlier mods for Civilization II and Civilization III, especially Rhye's of Civilization which also sought greater historical accuracy. The popularity of these prompted Civilization IV developers Firaxis to invite him to contribute content for inclusion in the game upon its release. The result was two maps ("Earth" and "Ice Age Earth") and two historical scenarios ("Earth 1000 AD" and "Greek World").

The first alpha version of Rhye's and Fall of Civilization, then called "Rhye's Catapult", was released on 26 April 2006, featuring an elaborated Earth map and the "Rise and Fall" mechanism. With the release of the first official Civilization IV expansion, Warlords, the mod was forked into two versions: one incorporating the new Warlords content and one that remained compatible with 'vanilla' Civilization IV. A third fork was made with the release of the second expansion for the same reason. The Beyond the Sword version of Rhye's and Fall of Civilization was one of the three user-created scenarios that shipped with the official Firaxis expansion (along with Fall from Heaven and Road to War). Development of all three forks continued concurrently, with new features being incorporated into all as far as possible. The final versions of all three were released on 2 June 2010.

As of May 2010 there are two 'variants' of Rhye's and Fall of Civilization, which alter the core gameplay in some way. The first, RFC MP, was released on 21 October 2007 and enables multiplayer games of Rhye's and Fall of Civilization over the internet, LAN or locally in hotseat mode. In order to make this possible, several gameplay features had to be disabled. The second variant, RFC RAND, was released on 28 July 2008. It is similar to regular Rhye's and Fall of Civilization but is played on a randomised map of various sizes, climates and "Earth likeness". Other parameters are also randomised, such as which civilizations will appear in the game and when and where they will "spawn". The variant is intended to provide "something halfway between RFC and standard Civ", but the reaction to it has been mixed.

== Gameplay ==
A successful outcome to Operation Sea Lion as depicted in Rhye's and Fall of Civilization

Rhye's and Fall of Civilization is set on Earth and is designed to mirror a historical Earth as closely as possible. To this end, most civilizations have historically accurate starting locations and times, instead of random starting locations all at 4,000 BC as in a typical game. When a new civilization appears, any foreign cities in its core territory will "flip" to the new civ; this can have the effect of simulating such historical events as the breakup of the Roman Empire and the American Revolution. Each civilization also gets a passive power based on its history. For example, Russia has a power, called "General Winter", that makes enemy units inside its borders take a small amount of damage, while England has a power that gives its naval units two extra first strike chances called "The Power of the Royal Navy".

Nuclear war in the Middle East between Arabia and Persia

One of the main features of Rhye's and Fall of Civilization is the game's ability to monitor the stability of national governments, taking into account war, disease, corruption, invasion, and other factors which might influence the fall of a nation. If a "major power" controlled by the AI in the game becomes extremely unstable, it will cease to exist and its former territory will be split up into several independent nations. These smaller countries are not barbarian-controlled, and do not normally attack major nations unless attacked first. When a human player collapses, only about half of their cities become independent; the other half remain loyal. After one civilization has discovered nationalism, ancient or collapsed civilizations may respawn, either in independent lands or in lands belonging to relatively unstable civilizations. For example, in the nineteenth century the Greek civilization may declare its independence from an occupying power, which is usually the Ottoman Empire.

The game spawns plagues randomly through the world around certain dates; for example, a plague will generally begin in the 14th–15th century to simulate the Black Death. Plague spreads from country to country, entering cities. A city afflicted with plague will lose one population point per turn, as well as a hefty unhealthiness penalty. Units garrisoned in or close to plague-affected cities will take damage until they die or the plague ends. The more health bonuses that a civilization has, the faster the plague ends. Plagues can be permanently avoided by a nation once the technology "Medicine" is researched.

Rhye's and Fall of Civilization is also designed to simulate the drastic impact that the arrival of Europeans had in the New World. Upon sailing any unit from Europe to the Americas, the player is instantly granted several military units to simulate the exploits of the Spanish conquistadors. This also spawns a plague exclusively amongst the Amerindian civilizations to simulate smallpox. Unless they are destroyed by the conquistadors, Mesoamerican civilizations such as the Aztecs and the Mayans typically become vassals to colonial powers, including Spain, France, England, and Portugal. English expansion in North America usually comes to an end when the territory changes to that of the United States in 1776 AD although it is possible to maintain a presence in Canada.

Besides the typical victory conditions in the game, every civilization has another victory option – unique historical victories. These usually include three historical achievements that the nation managed or attempted. For example, Rome's unique historical victory is to have a barracks, amphitheatre and aqueduct in 5 cities by 200 AD, emulate (at least) the reaches of the Western Roman Empire by 450 AD, and never lose any city to barbarians by 1000 AD. Upon completing two unique historical victories, a Triumphal Arch is built in the capital which increases military unit production, and a new golden age starts.

Once three civilizations discover the "Nationalism" technology, World Congresses will occur once every 25 turns. Major nations are invited to participate. Each civilization has the opportunity to choose from a list of cities which they would like to occupy; the others then vote yes, no or abstain. For the city to change control, there must simply be more "yes" than "no" votes, and the change takes place instantaneously. If a city controlled by a human is voted to be handed over, the player can either comply or refuse the decision; refusing may mean war with nations who voted "yes." World Congresses end once the United Nations has been built.

In Rhye's and Fall of Civilization, not every civilization starts at the same time. In the 3000 BC starting scenario, only Egypt, Babylon, China, and India are initially present; in the 600 AD start, only China, Japan, the Vikings, and Arabia (along with the unplayable Byzantine Empire) are initially present. Other nations such as Spain and Turkey appear later in the game (at 720 AD and 1280 AD respectively). If a player chooses to be one of the civilizations that are not in the game at the start, then the game will play the initial nations automatically until the player's chosen nation would appear.

Until the research of Nationalism, civilizations are able to hire mercenary units, and also lend out their own units. In order to hire a mercenary unit, a lump sum of gold is required to be paid, and the player must also pay a maintenance cost for the unit, as for other military units. Typically, the more experienced a unit is, the more gold it costs to hire, and hiring out a more experienced unit also increases gold received. Mercenary units have a civilization's name (or a barbarian city's name) attached as a prefix e.g. Thracian crossbowman or Egyptian swordsman. A unit being hired out can be recalled at any time, arriving in the civilization's capital three turns after it is recalled.

Two large and many small changes were made to the technology tree. The relationships between Civil Service, Constitution, Military Tradition, and Nationalism were completely rearranged so that Music and Military Tradition were no longer "dead end" technologies and Civil Service was now an optional prerequisite, rather than an absolute one, for many later-era technologies. The relationships between Gunpowder, Chemistry, and Military Science were also rearranged so that Military Science was no longer a "dead-end" technology. Numerous buildings, units, civics, religions, etc. had their prerequisites altered, and some became obsolete with different technologies as well; Monuments, for example, became obsolete with Calendar instead of Astronomy.

== Reception ==
The inclusion of fan scenarios in Beyond the Sword was well received by critics. Rhye's and Fall of Civilization was singled out for praise by several reviewers. Tom Chick of Yahoo! Games called it "one of the most exciting and robust mods you'll ever see for a game", while GameSpot's Andrew Park said it "provided a fresh new coat of paint to the core Civilization gameplay". A review of Civilization IV: Beyond the Sword also praised Rhye's and Fall for being superior to the official Firaxis game mods.
