= Baba Yetu =

Theme song of the video game Civilization IV

Song by Christopher Tin featuring Ron Ragin and Stanford Talisman

from the album Sid Meier's Civilization IV Official Soundtrack
- Language: Swahili
- English title: Our Father
- Written: 2005
- Released: October 24, 2005
- Genre: Gospel
- Length: 3:28
- Label: 2K Games
- Composer: Christopher Tin

Audio sample
- The chorus of "Baba Yetu": file; help

"Baba Yetu" (Swahili: "Our Father") is the main theme song for the 2005 video game Civilization IV. It was composed by Christopher Tin and performed by Ron Ragin and the Stanford Talisman. For its re-release in Tin's debut album Calling All Dawns, it was performed by the Soweto Gospel Choir. The song, when re-released, became the first piece of video game music to be nominated for and to win a Grammy Award.

== Composition ==
=== Creation ===
Being a fan of the Civilization series, Tin reconnected with his former roommate Soren Johnson during his five-year college reunion at Stanford University; both had been part of an overseas program during their studies at Oxford University, with Johnson studying history and Tin studying music. Johnson told Tin at the reunion he had been working on Civilization III, and Tin expressed his love of the series to him. Some months after the reunion, Johnson contacted Tin and told him they were looking for music for the introduction for their new game Civilization IV, and wanted him to help.

=== Inspiration ===
Johnson said that in the creation of the song, they were inspired by the performances of the Stanford Talisman, an a cappella group at Stanford that specializes in traditional African music, and wanted Tin to compose something similar for the theme. Tin took about a month to compose the track before recording it with Talisman for the game.

Christopher Tin later said in an interview that he was inspired by the visuals Firaxis gave him. He said that his inspiration came from the main menu screen of Civilization IV, which showed a video loop of the earth as seen from outer space. It was a shot of North Africa and showed the sun rising over the horizon of Earth every half a minute. Tin said that, "It was beautiful and serene, and almost instantaneously the opening notes of the piece started playing in my head."

== Lyrics ==
The lyrics of "Baba Yetu" (which means "Our Father" in Swahili) are a translation of the Lord's Prayer.

Swahili	English
"Baba Yetu"
Baba yetu, yetu uliye Mbinguni yetu, yetu amina! Baba yetu yetu uliye M Jina lako e litukuzwe. Utupe leo chakula chetu Tunachohitaji, utusamehe Makosa yetu, hey! Kama nasi tunavyowasamehe Waliotukosea usitutie Katika majaribu, lakini Utuokoe, na yule, muovu e milele! Ufalme wako ufike utakalo Lifanyike duniani kama mbinguni. (Amina)	Our Father, who art in Heaven. Amen! Our Father, Hallowed be thy name. Give us this day our daily bread, Forgive us of our trespasses, As we forgive others Who trespass against us Lead us not into temptation, but deliver us from the evil one forever. Thy kingdom come, thy will be done On Earth as it is in Heaven. (Amen)

In 2007, "Baba Yetu" was released by Alfred Music Publishing, and it was rearranged by Tin for an SATB a cappella choir with optional percussion accompaniment in 2011. Other arrangements include SSATBB choir, TTBB choir, piano quintet, concert band, string orchestra, and piano/voice.

== Reviews ==
"Baba Yetu" garnered much critical praise, with over 20 reviewers singling out the theme on game review websites such as IGN and GameSpy.

== Awards and achievements ==
"Baba Yetu" was nominated for the 53rd Annual Grammy Awards in the Grammy Award for Best Arrangement, Instrumental and Vocals category, and on February 13, 2011, it was announced as the winner of its category, making it the first piece of music composed for a video game to be nominated for and to win a Grammy Award. At the 10th annual Independent Music Awards, "Baba Yetu" was the winner in the 'Song Used in Film/TV/Multimedia' and 'World Beat Song' categories.

== Notable performances ==
"Baba Yetu" is a frequent piece performed during Video Games Live concerts. It has been performed at various venues and events around the world, including Carnegie Hall, the Lincoln Center, Disney Concert Hall, The Dubai Fountain, the Kennedy Center, Royal Festival Hall, the Hollywood Bowl, the New Year's Concert of the sixty-seventh session of the United Nations General Assembly, as well as the 2017 Llangollen International Musical Eisteddfod. Notable ensembles that have performed the song include the Royal Philharmonic Orchestra, Welsh National Opera, National Symphony Orchestra, US Navy Band, and various YouTube artists, including Peter Hollens, Alex Boye, BYU Men's Choir and Korean Acapella group Maytree which was praised by Tin himself.

"Baba Yetu" is a popular contemporary choral piece, and has been sung in many competitions. Notably, the Angel City Chorale performed it during the 13th season of America's Got Talent, earning guest judge Olivia Munn's golden buzzer, advancing the choir to the live shows. On the final night of that same season on the show, the acrobatic dance group Zurcaroh performed a routine to the song. In addition, the Stellenbosch University Choir won the Open, Youth, and Mixed choir categories for their performance of it at the 2018 Llangollen International Musical Eisteddfod.

On the 6th of August 2019, "Baba Yetu" was played at the signing of the Maputo Accord, which brought an end to the RENAMO insurgency in Mozambique.

In August 2023, "Baba Yetu" was performed as part of a Civilization VI concert at the National Theater of Korea by the FLASIC orchestra directed by Sol Chin.
