= Civilization IV: Beyond the Sword =

- Developer: Firaxis Games
- Publishers: 2K Games (Win); Aspyr (Mac)
- Series: Civilization
- Engine: Gamebryo
- Platforms: Windows, Mac OS X
- Release: Windows: UK/AU: July 20, 2007; NA: July 23, 2007; Mac OS X: NA: July 27, 2007
- Genre: Turn-based strategy
- Modes: Single player, multiplayer

Sid Meier's Civilization IV: Beyond the Sword is the second expansion pack of the turn-based strategy video game Civilization IV. The expansion focuses on adding content to the in-game time periods following the invention of gunpowder, and includes more general content such as 11 new scenarios, 10 new civilizations, and 16 new leaders.

== Gameplay ==
Beyond the Sword offers several new features:

- Corporations: A new gameplay feature, similar to the "religion" feature, allows players to create corporations and spread them throughout the world. Each corporation provides benefits in exchange for certain resources.
- Espionage: Now available much earlier in the game, this expanded feature offers players many new ways to spy on opponents, stir citizen unrest and defend their government's secrets.
- Random Events: New random events such as natural disasters, pleas for help, and demands from their citizens will challenge players to overcome obstacles in order for their civilizations to prosper. Random events can also be beneficial, such as scientific breakthroughs and incidents that improve relations with a neighbor.
- Advanced Starts: When starting the game in any era, this new option allows the player to purchase components for an already-developed nation.
- Expanded Space Victory: Obtaining a space victory is now more difficult and requires more strategy and decision-making than before.
- Expanded Diplomatic Victory: It is now possible to achieve diplomatic victories much earlier in the game, and to defy resolutions.
- New Game Options: Beyond the Sword offers various new game options, like new world-types and the option to play any leader-civilization combination.

=== Corporations ===
Corporations become available with discovery of the Corporation technology. Each of the seven available Corporations requires a particular type of Great Person, a particular additional technology, and access to particular resources to build the Corporate Headquarters and found that Corporation; each of the seven Corporations can be founded only once per game. Each Corporation consumes specific resources, and supplies alternative resources or benefits in return. The more instances of resources they consume, the more food, production, commerce, or resources they supply. Corporations can be spread like religions (using the Executive unit as a missionary) to other cities, including foreign cities; any city hosting a Corporation branch must pay a maintenance fee for its services, while the owner of the Corporate Headquarters receives bonus gold for each branch. Players can block foreign corporations from operating in their cities by adopting the Mercantilism civic, and they can block all corporations, even their own, by adopting the State Property civic.

=== Espionage ===
Espionage's importance in Civilization IV has been raised to compare with that of scientific research, culture, income from taxes etc. The new espionage slider allows the player to divert part of their income towards espionage activities against other civilizations. Once the player has reached certain thresholds of espionage investment, the player starts gaining some automatic intelligence benefits over rival civilizations. The player can also send Spy units into foreign territory to gather further intelligence and to perform various missions of destruction and propaganda. Their role is a bit different, because spies are now invisible to all units, save for other spies. Great Spies are born in cities, like other Great Persons, and can perform typical functions like serving as a Specialist, starting a Golden Age, or building a unique building. Their special function allows them to infiltrate enemy cities, giving the player significant advantage in espionage against that civilization. Just like other Great Persons, they have unique names, and their appearance changes accordingly to the time period, e.g., a Great Spy in the ancient era shows up as a ninja, just as the Industrial-Age Great Spy appears as a tuxedo-sporting James Bond-style unit, complete with similar thematic music once a mission is performed. Conversely, espionage has become somewhat of a hindrance in the pursuit of normal diplomatic victories. The act of catching opposing AI controlled spies will devastate your diplomatic relations with those players forcing you into a negative relationship that you cannot recover from. Even a friendly AI could potentially have a hidden −10 points from captured spies that will never allow a diplomatic victory, even through rampant generosity of resources, technology, gold, and all other attempts to negate the immense negative statistic. (This can be tested by saving an in-progress player vs CPU game and continuing it with players in place of the AI.)

=== Random Events ===
The expansion reintroduces SimCity- and Alpha Centauri-style random events from the original Civilization game, which can cause the game to swing in the player's favor or present another obstacle the player must overcome. There are more than a hundred of these events, including natural disasters, such as earthquakes that can destroy buildings, and diplomatic marriages that might suddenly turn two former rivals into friends. Together these new events give each game a completely unique flavor. In addition, each game offers players the opportunity for rewards through the completion of special events in the form of missions ("quests").

Some examples of Random Events in the game include tsunamis, floods, discovery of new resources, earthquakes, diplomatic marriages, pleas for help from other civilizations, and unexpected demands from citizens.

=== Advanced Starts ===
Advanced Starts are a pre-game setup phase players use to purchase cities, improvements, buildings, technologies, and units. It works in both single-player and multi-player. The player decides what to purchase and where to place it. When everyone is done, the game starts with players controlling relatively balanced, advanced empires with a working infrastructure. This mechanism is ideal for those who want to jump right in and experience a balanced game in a later era, without having to start it from the Stone Age. However, if Advanced Starts are used, players cannot declare war for the first 10 turns of the game.

=== Updated Space victory ===
To acquire a Space Victory, the game now requires the player's spaceship to reach Alpha Centauri, rather than simply launch. It is now also possible to build spaceships that fly faster than those of other civilizations, so that a player can achieve Space Victory, even if they finished building a spaceship after a competitor.

=== Apostolic Palace ===
The new Apostolic Palace wonder allows the player to win an early diplomatic victory, centuries before the United Nations is due to make its appearance. The wonder is tied to the state religion of the player who built it. Depending on the influence of the Palace's religion on their civilization, players get votes to cast on decrees like holy wars, trade embargoes, or peace enforcement. It is later rebuffed by Communism and made obsolete by Mass Media. At this point, the more modern United Nations takes over many of its functions.

=== Other changes ===
The expansion offers various new world-types and game options. The player will have the option to play as any leader-civilization combination, therefore allowing "what-if" possibilities. Also, a new feature is the option to only trade away player researched technologies. Finally players can optionally choose any religion once they have founded one of the specific religion-founding technologies, so that the same religions will not be dominant in every game.

The title screen depicts the Santa Maria del Fiore of Florence, but it is not visible in the game.

=== New content ===
New content includes:

- Ten new civilizations and leaders (Babylonia, Byzantine Empire, Ethiopian Empire, Holy Roman Empire, Khmer Empire, the Mayans, Native Americans, Netherlands, Portugal and Sumer)
- 6 new leaders for existing civilizations (Abe Lincoln, de Gaulle, Boudica, Darius I, Suleiman the Magnificent and Pericles).
- 25 new units, 18 buildings and new technologies added primarily to the late game.
- 11 new scenarios.
- Six new Wonders of the World.
- New diplomatic resolutions through the United Nations.

=== General changes ===
- Improvements in AI (Artificial Intelligence) for harder games across all difficulty levels. The AI player will attempt more ways to win than before. It is also better at warfare (particularly naval operations) and economic management.
- Early-game units now have different regional art styles and motifs.
- Colonies can split off from their motherland to form new civilizations if maintenance costs get too high
- The foreign advisory screen has been overhauled.
- Beyond the Sword includes some material from the previous Warlords expansion pack, specifically the core game features, but not the Warlords scenarios.

=== New scenarios ===
The expansion initially delivered 10 new scenarios; one additional scenario, Mesoamerica, was made available in the 2008 3.17 patch. Some were developed by the fan community, and were critically well received. The following scenarios are included:

- Final Frontier: A space scenario where you control a human colony and expand your territory in space.
- Afterworld: A squad-based tactical "thriller" where the player fights undead in the X-com style.
- Gods of Old: A scenario focused on Sumerian religion.
- Next War: A futuristic sci-fi scenario with clone armies, cyborgs and more.
- Charlemagne: Conquer Europe during the Dark Ages, gain the Pope's favor enough to be crowned the Holy Roman Emperor.
- Crossroads of the World: A late medieval age scenario where you explore and conquer the crossroads of the world in Africa, the Middle East and Asia.
- Broken Star: Civil war has struck Russia. Unite the Russian bear!
- WWII Road to War: Atlast! Play as the Allies or Axis in both the Pacific and Europe.
- Fall from Heaven: A popular fantasy mod for Civilization IV, improved for the expansion.
- Rhye's and Fall of Civilization: Another improved and updated favorite among the fans' mods for Civ IV.
- Mesoamerica: Ancient tribes from Mesoamerica (what is Mexico today) battle each other and the Spanish.

== Modding ==
In general, with the exception of Final Frontier, the "external mods" (official mods originally made by users, instead of by Firaxis) had the best reception: "Rounding out BtS is a selection of mods and scenarios. Some are the best of the mod scene, others Firaxis designs. Sadly for Firaxis, it's the already existing mods that shine – the excellent fantasy-set Fall from Heaven, the intriguing, history-following Rhye's and Fall of Civilizations, and WWII: The Road to War."

For example, Rhye's and Fall of Civilization was called "one of the most exciting and robust mods you'll ever see for any game" in Yahoo! Games review, and "a fresh new coat of paint to the core Civilization gameplay" in the GameSpot one. French magazine Cyberstratège reckoned it the best of the scenarios released in Beyond the Sword, assigning the best mark (9 out of 10) among them. Whereas the standard, epic game takes historical civilizations from different eras and locations on the planet and starts them each in 4000 BC on a random map, Rhye's and Fall of Civilization puts the civilizations into their proper time and place in human history. The mod is also notable for the addition of features meant to enhance the historical feel of the game such as a stability system (civs truly can rise and fall), plagues, historical place names, and scripted AI behavior that mirrors real Earth history. An added victory condition, the Historical Victory is also added. This victory requires the player to meet certain conditions that are unique to each civilization, for example the Americans must not allow European cities in North America by 1900 and Arabia must spread Islam to 30% of the world in order to win.

Another notable Beyond the Sword mod, Fall From Heaven II, was created by the fan-team who were involved in developing the scenario Age of Ice. It is set in a dark fantasy world directly after the scenario, at the end of an ice age and the rebirth of civilization. FfH rebalances the game to emphasize warfare with small, enduring groups instead of human waves; adds a magic system with caster units and "mana" resources; and changes religions and civilizations from being mostly interchangeable to "wholly different experiences." A full-length review in Pelit magazine awarded FfH 92% describing the mod as "a clump of clichés at first sight" that turns out to be "the finest fantasy strategy since Master of Magic and the best times of Warlords." The reviewer further complimented a strong backstory ("for a mod") and an extensive manual and Civilopedia. He criticized technical problems with online multiplayer, problems that are largely beyond a mod's capacity to fix, some problems with sound and high system requirements.

As with Civilization II and Civilization III, Civilization IV featured fan-made World War II scenarios. Beyond the Sword introduces a fan-created mod, "The Road to War", offering three variants – Pacific 1936, Europe 1936, and Europe 1939 – as well as a host of different scenario-specific units.

== Reception ==
IGN rated Beyond the Sword 8.9/10, praising its improved AI and large quantity of new content and features. Eurogamer also lauded the new content and features, rating the game 8/10.

Hyper's Dirk Watch commends the game for being "addictive and its brilliant diplomatic additions".
