= Sue Fink =

American singer-songwriter and conductor

Sue Fink is an American singer, songwriter, conductor, and voice teacher.

== Career ==
Fink is the founder and conductor of the Angel City Chorale, as well as a songwriter and voice teacher. She graduated magna cum laude with a Bachelor of Fine Arts from the University of California, Los Angeles, where she studied conducting with Roger Wagner.

Fink toured internationally as a member of the Roger Wagner Chorale, eventually establishing the Oriana Renaissance Ensemble and serving as its conductor.

In 1976, she founded the Los Angeles Women's Community Chorus (LAWCC), which she also conducted for 10 years. Under Fink's direction, the Angel City Chorale has become internationally famous for its music and call for community-building through diversity. The 170-member group has toured internationally and released several CDs. One World, released in late 2018, reached the number 12 spot on the Billboard world music chart. In 2018, under Fink's direction, the Chorale performed the Christopher Tin song "Baba Yetu" on America's Got Talent. They won the Golden Buzzer from Olivia Munn, advancing to the semi-finals.

As a performing singer-songwriter, Fink released two critically acclaimed solo albums, Big Promise and True Life Adventure. She was awarded an Achievement of Excellence by the National Association of Independent Record Distributors (NAIRD).

Fink has conducted at events such as the National Democratic Convention and received a certificate of recognition from Los Angeles Mayor Eric Garcetti. In London, she conducted the Royal Philharmonic Orchestra and recorded at Abbey Road Studios.

Fink maintains a private voice studio in Los Angeles. She also composes and arranges for choral organizations, as well as writing for television and movie soundtracks.

== Musical works ==
As a singer-songwriter, Fink has released two critically acclaimed albums, one of which received an award of excellence from the National Association of Independent Record Distributors (NAIRD). In addition, Fink wrote several songs with partner Paul Nelson that were featured in several films, including the Academy Award-winning The Usual Suspects, Stephen King's Apt Pupil, and several movies featured on HBO, Showtime, CBS, and ABC. She also composed songs for a number of TV shows, including NYPD Blue, All My Children, Two Against Time and The Young and the Restless.
