= To Shiver the Sky =

To Shiver The Sky

Studio album by Christopher Tin
- Released: 21 August 2020
- Recorded: Abbey Road
- Genre: World
- Length: 52:43
- Label: Universal Music Classics

Christopher Tin chronology
| The Drop That Contained the Sea (2014) | To Shiver The Sky (2020) | The Lost Birds (2022) |

To Shiver the Sky is the third studio album by the American composer Christopher Tin. Released in 2020, it features texts about the history of flight ranging from Leonardo da Vinci's writings on flight to John F. Kennedy's "We choose to go to the Moon" speech.

Creation of the album was funded by a Kickstarter campaign. The campaign met its goal in the first 36 hours, and went on to raise $221,415 (over 4 times the initial goal), making it the highest funded classical music Kickstarter project ever.

The song "Sogno di Volare" was composed as a main theme for the 2016 video game Civilization VI.

== Track listing ==
| No. | Title | Lyrics notes | Length |
|---|---|---|---|
| 1. | "Sogno di Volare ("The Dream of Flight")" (feat. Royal Opera Chorus) | From Leonardo da Vinci's writings on flight (Adapted by Chiara Cortez). Sung in Italian | 3:51 |
| 2. | "The Heavenly Kingdom" (feat. ModernMedieval, The Assembly) | From Hildegard von Bingen: "Scivias". Sung in Latin | 2:05 |
| 3. | "Daedalus and Icarus" (feat. Pene Pati, Royal Opera Chorus, The Assembly) | From Ovid's "Metamorphoses". Sung in Latin | 5:14 |
| 4. | "The Fall" (feat. Pene Pati, ModernMedieval, Royal Opera Chorus) | From Dante Alighieri's "Divine Comedy". Sung in Italian | 4:53 |
| 5. | "Astronomy" (feat. The Assembly, Anna Lapwood) | from Nicolaus Copernicus' "De revolutionibus orbium coelestium" (Polish translation and poeticization by Janusz Mrzigod). Sung in Polish | 7:06 |
| 6. | "To the Stars" (feat. Pembroke College Girls' Choir, The Assembly) | From Jules Verne's "De la Terre à la Lune" (Adaptation by Gabriel Majou). Sung in French | 4:18 |
| 7. | "Oh, the Humanity" (feat. Pene Pati, Royal Opera Chorus) | From speeches by Ferdinand von Zeppelin (Adaptation by Evita Wagner). Sung in German | 4:42 |
| 8. | "Courage" (feat. Danielle de Niese) | A setting of Amelia Earhart's poem 'Courage'. Sung in English | 4:42 |
| 9. | "Become Death" (feat. ModernMedieval, Royal Opera Chorus) | From the Bhagavad Gita, as quoted by J. Robert Oppenheimer. Sung in Sanskrit | 2:57 |
| 10. | "The Power of the Spirit" (feat. Royal Opera Chorus) | From quotes by Yuri Gagarin. Sung in Russian | 2:36 |
| 11. | "We Choose to Go to the Moon" (feat. Danielle de Niese, Pene Pati, ModernMedieval, Pembroke College Girls' Choir, Royal Opera Chorus, The Assembly) | From John F. Kennedy's Address at Rice University on the Nation's Space Effort. Sung in English | 10:19 |

== Charts ==
To Shiver the Sky first spent two weeks on Billboard's Top Classical Crossover Albums, peaking at rank 1 the week of 5 September 2020. That same week it placed 6 on Top Classical Albums and 80 for Current Album Sales. It re-entered the Top Classical Crossover Albums chart for a third week the week of October 3, 2020.

| Chart | Peak position |
|---|---|
| US Top Classical Crossover Albums (Billboard) | 1 |
| US Top Classical Albums (Billboard) | 6 |
| US Current Album Sales (Billboard) | 80 |
