= Dulce Pontes =

Portuguese songwriter and singer (born 1969)

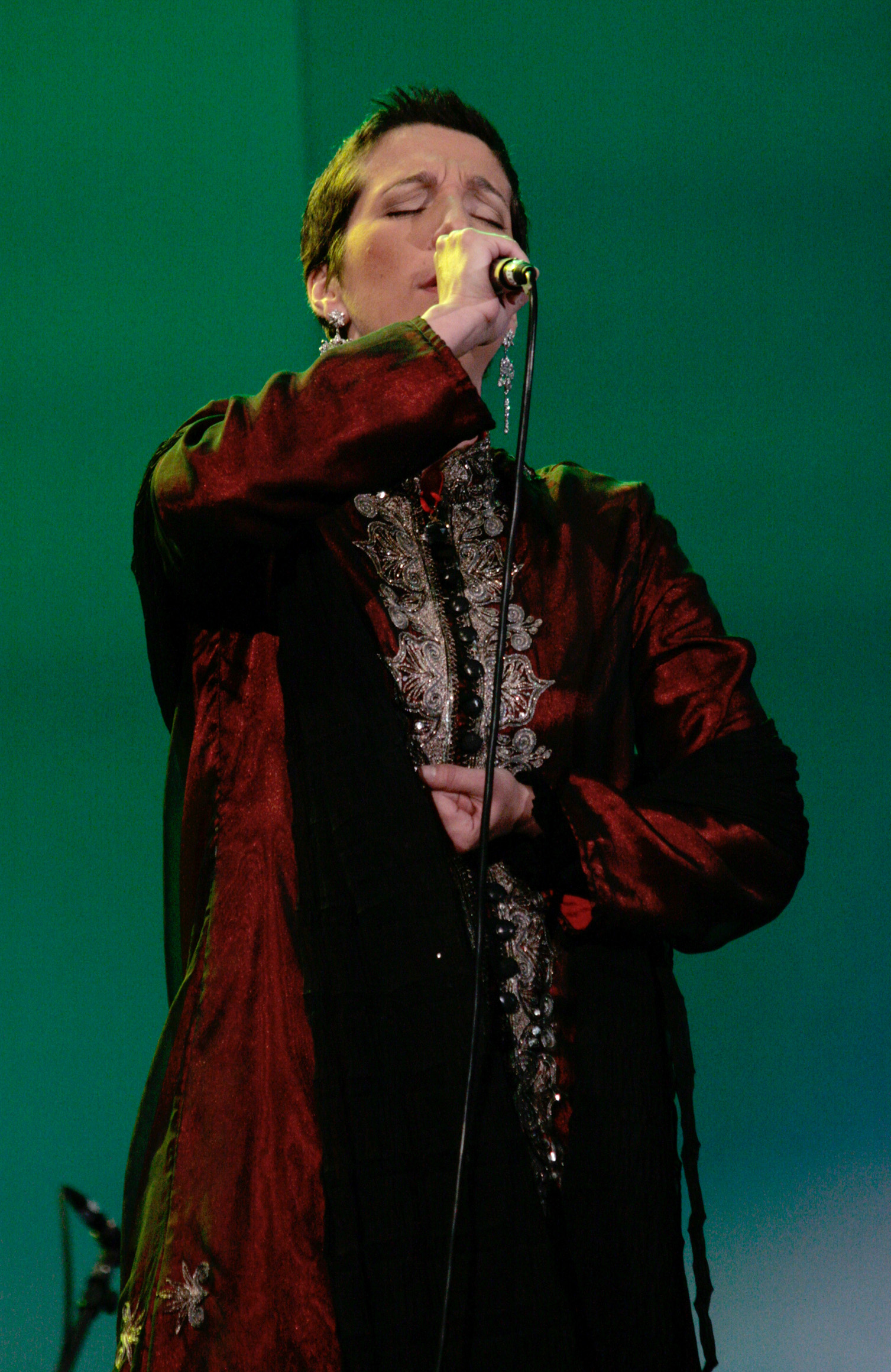
- Dulce Pontes in 2013.

Background information
- Born: 8 April 1969 (age 57)
- Origin: Montijo, Portugal
- Genres: Fado, world music, classical, pop
- Occupations: Songwriter, singer
- Years active: 1988-present
- Labels: Movieplay Portuguesa; Universal Music; Ondea
- Website: dulcepontesofficial.com

Dulce José Silva Pontes (Portuguese: [ˈdulsɨ ʒuˈzɛ ˈsilvɐ ˈpõtɨʃ]; born 8 April 1969) is a Portuguese songwriter and singer who performs in many musical styles, including classical music, pop and folk. She is usually defined as a world music artist. Her songs contributed to the 1990s revival of Portuguese urban folk music called fado.

== Biography ==
Pontes was born in 1969 in Montijo, a town in the District of Setúbal, near Lisbon. She trained as a pianist, and started a career in singing after entering a competition in her hometown at the age of 18. She soon became an actress on Portuguese television and theatre. In 1991, she won the Festival RTP da Canção with her song "Lusitana paixão", (known in English as "Tell Me"), which led her to represent Portugal at the Eurovision Song Contest 1991. She finished 8th in the competition, which was at the time the third-best finish for a Portuguese performer. Later that year, she also represented Portugal in the OTI Festival 1991 with the song "Ao sul da América".

Her interpretation of famous fado themes like "Lágrima" e "Estranha Forma de Vida", earned her in the press the name of "successor and heir to Amália Rodrigues".

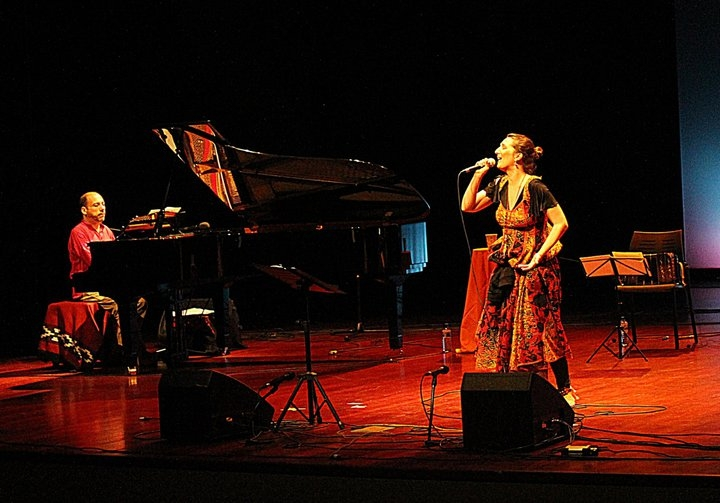
Dulce Pontes in concert (2011).

Dulce Pontes started her career as a mainstream pop artist, but over the years she has evolved to become a world music singer. She blends traditional fado with contemporary styles and searches out new forms of musical expression. She introduced musical traditions of the Iberian Peninsula in her work, rediscovered many long forgotten popular tunes and found use for obsolete musical instruments. Her work is inspired and influenced not only by Iberian musical tradition, but also, African, Brazilian, Arabic and Bulgarian sounds. She sings mostly in her native Portuguese.

Dulce Pontes has collaborated with Cesária Évora, Caetano Veloso, Marisa Monte, Daniela Mercury, Carlos Núñez, the Chieftains, Kepa Junkera, Eleftheria Arvanitaki, George Dalaras, Andrea Bocelli (O Mar e Tu, duet sung by Pontes in Portuguese and Bocelli in Neapolitan, for his 1999 album Sogno), Joan Manuel Serrat, Wayne Shorter, Trilok Gurtu, Christopher Tin for his albums Calling All Dawns (Grammy awarded) (on the song Se É Pra Vir Que Venha) and The Drop That Contained the Sea (on the song Passou o Verão) and others.

Her song "Canção do Mar" appeared on the soundtrack of Hollywood film Primal Fear. A 30-second piece of that same song serves as the theme to the NBC police drama Southland.

Her album Focus (2003) is the fruit of a collaboration with Italian composer Ennio Morricone with whom she has also toured and performed live. She sang in prestigious concert halls like Carnegie Hall in New York and the Royal Albert Hall in London, among many other places worldwide.

In June 2006, Pontes prepared her double LP O Coração Tem Três Portas (The Heart Has Three Doors). It was recorded live without an audience in Convent of the Order of Christ in Tomar and St Mary Church in Óbidos. According to the artist, it is "her most personal and intimate album." It includes Portuguese folk music, mostly fado". It was released in December 2006.

Dulce Pontes with José Carreras in duet together, starred in the official opening of the international election of the New 7 Wonders of the World in 2007 with her theme "One World" (We are one).

In 2009, Pontes released Momentos, a career-spanning double disc collection that included previously unreleased tracks.

Her versatility in music styles shows also in her performances of Latin-American tango's of Astor Piazzolla (for example "Balada para un Loco" and "Maria de Buenos Aires" or "Volver" by Carlos Gardel).

== Personal life ==
She is the mother of a son, José Gabriel, who was born on 23 January 2002 in Lisbon and a daughter, Maria José, who was born on 24 January 2009 in Amadora.

== Discography ==
- Lusitana (1992)
- Lágrimas (1993) (Tears)
- Brisa do Coração (1995) (Breeze of the Heart) - album live recorded during a concert held May 6, 1995, in Porto.
- Caminhos (1996) (Paths)
- O Primeiro Canto (1999) (The First Chant)
- Best Of (2003)
- Focus (2003) - with Ennio Morricone collaboration.
- O Coração Tem Três Portas (2006) (The Heart Has Three Doors) - including a DVD, recorded live in a convent and church
- Momentos (2009) (Moments)
- Peregrinação (2017) (Pilgrimage)
- Best Of (Deluxe) (2019)
- Perfil (2022) (Profile)

Awards and achievements
Preceded by Nucha with "Há sempre alguém"	Portugal in the Eurovision Song Contest; 1991	Succeeded by Dina with "Amor d'água fresca"
Preceded by Dora with "Quero acordar"	Portugal in the OTI Festival; 1991	Succeeded by Cristina Roque with "Uma avenida inteira de saudade"
