= Anonymous 4 =

American female a cappella quartet

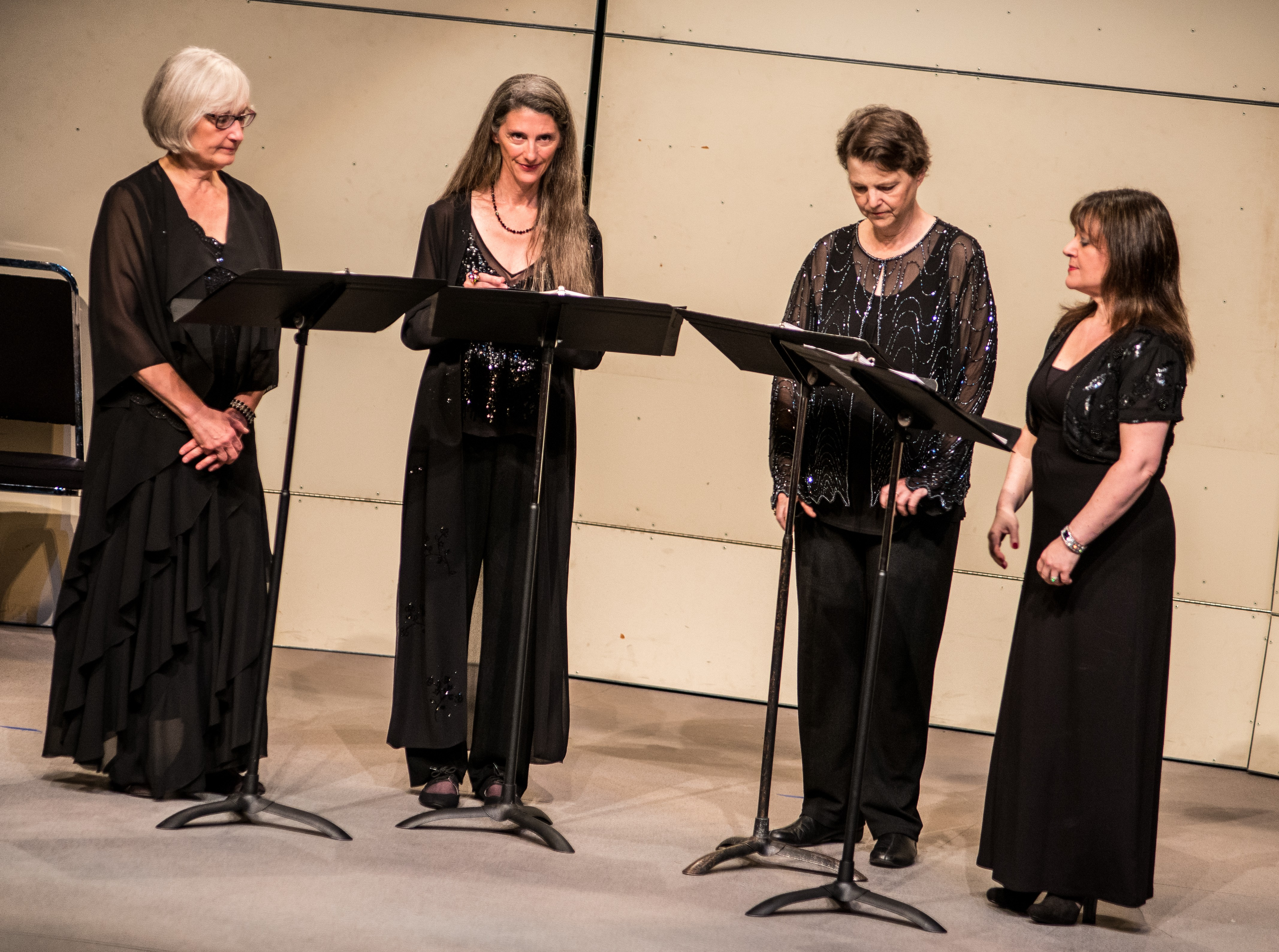
- Anonymous 4 in October, 2012

Background information
- Genres: A cappella, Medieval
- Years active: 1992–2016
- Labels: Harmonia Mundi, Sony Classical Records
- Members: Marsha Genensky, Susan Hellauer, Ruth Cunningham, Jacqueline Horner-Kwiatek
- Past members: Johanna Maria Rose
- Website: www.anonymous4.com

Anonymous 4 was an American female a cappella quartet, founded in 1986 and based in New York City. Their main performance genre was medieval music, although later they also premiered works by recent composers such as John Tavener and Steve Reich.

The name of the group is a pun on the name used to refer to an anonymous English music theorist of the late 13th century, Anonymous IV, who is the principal source on the two famous composers of the Notre Dame school, Léonin and Pérotin.

Anonymous 4 performed in cities throughout North America, and were regulars at major international festivals. The 2003–2004 season was their last as a full-time recording and touring ensemble, but they continued to tour and make recordings while pursuing individual projects.

The group collaborated with the Chilingirian Quartet on their 2003 album Darkness Into Light and The Mountain Goats on their 2012 album Transcendental Youth as well as with Christopher Tin in 2009 on his album Calling All Dawns, and in 2014 on The Drop That Contained the Sea.

The CD 1865, which features songs from the Civil War with Bruce Molsky on guitar, fiddle, banjo, and vocals was their final recording. The ensemble disbanded at the end of the 2015–2016 season.

== Lineup ==
The original lineup included Johanna Maria Rose, Marsha Genensky, Susan Hellauer, and Ruth Cunningham. In 1998, Cunningham left and was replaced by Jacqueline Horner-Kwiatek. In 2008, Cunningham returned to the group in place of Johanna Maria Rose until their 2016 disbanding. Genensky grew up in California in the foothills of the Santa Monica Mountains; Hellauer was born and raised in the Bronx, New York; Cunningham was brought up in Millbrook, New York; Rose grew up in the village of Grand View-on-Hudson, New York; and Horner-Kwiatek is from Monkstown, County Antrim, in Northern Ireland (she won her Green Card in the Diversity Immigrant Visa program, commonly known as the "Green Card Lottery").

== Discography ==
| Name | Date | Label | Format |
|---|---|---|---|
| An English Ladymass: Medieval Chant and Polyphony | 1992 | Harmonia Mundi | CD |
| On Yoolis Night: Medieval Carols and Motets for Christmas | 1993 | Harmonia Mundi | CD |
| Love's Illusion: Music From The Montpellier Codex 13th Century | 1994 | Harmonia Mundi | CD |
| The Lily and the Lamb: Chant & Polyphony from Medieval England | 1994 | Harmonia Mundi | CD |
| Voices of Light | 1995 | Sony Classical Records | CD |
| Ancient Voices | 1995 | Harmonia Mundi | CD |
| Miracles of Sant'Iago | 1996 | Harmonia Mundi | CD |
| A Star in the East – Medieval Hungarian Christmas Music | 1996 | Harmonia Mundi | CD |
| Portrait of Anonymous 4 | 1997 | Harmonia Mundi | CD |
| Hildegard von Bingen – 11,000 Virgins: Chants for the Feast of St. Ursula | 1997 | Harmonia Mundi | CD |
| A Lammas Ladymass: 13th and 14th Century English Chant and Polyphony | 1998 | Harmonia Mundi | CD |
| Legends of St. Nicholas | 1999 | Harmonia Mundi | CD |
| 1000: A Mass for the End of Time | 1999 | Harmonia Mundi | CD |
| The Second Circle: Love Songs of Francesco Landini | 2001 | Harmonia Mundi | CD |
| La bele Marie: Songs to the Virgin from 13th-Century France | 2002 | Harmonia Mundi | CD |
| Darkness into Light – John Tavener | 2003 | Harmonia Mundi | CD |
| Wolcum Yule | 2003 | Harmonia Mundi | CD |
| American Angels | 2004 | Harmonia Mundi | CD |
| The Origin of Fire: Hildegard von Bingen | 2005 | Harmonia Mundi | CD |
| Carols and Chants for Christmas | 2005 | Harmonia Mundi | CD |
| Gloryland | 2006 | Harmonia Mundi | CD |
| Miracles of Compostela | 2008 | Harmonia Mundi | CD |
| Four Centuries of Chant | 2009 | Harmonia Mundi | CD |
| The Cherry Tree | 2010 | Harmonia Mundi | CD |
| Secret Voices: Chant & Polyphony from the Las Huelgas Codex, c. 1300 | 2011 | Harmonia Mundi | CD |
| Marie et Marion | 2014 | Harmonia Mundi | CD |
| love fail | 2014 | Cantaloupe | CD (A work composed for the group by David Lang using texts by such writers as Lydia Davis) |
| 1865 | 2015 | Harmonia Mundi | CD |
| Three Decades Of Anonymous 4: 1986–2016 | 2016 | Harmonia Mundi | CD (A retrospective collection of highlights from the 30-year collaboration with Harmonia Mundi, with repertoire ranging from 12th-century ecstatic chant to American roots music.) |
