= The Lost Birds =

Studio album by Christopher Tin
- Released: 30 September 2022
- Recorded: Abbey Road; Voces8 Centre
- Label: Decca Classics

Christopher Tin chronology
To Shiver the Sky (2020)	The Lost Birds (2022)

The Lost Birds: An Extinction Elegy is the fourth studio album by the American composer Christopher Tin. The music was performed by the Royal Philharmonic Orchestra with Voces8.

The album of twelve movements, ten of which use texts by poets Emily Dickinson, Sara Teasdale, Edna St. Vincent Millay, and Cristina Rossetti, along with two purely instrumental tracks. Unlike Tin's previous works, all movements of the piece are sung in English. The album is a musical memorial to bird species driven to extinction by humankind and a celebration of their beauty, while also presenting a warning about humanity's own tenuous existence on the planet.

It was nominated for the 2023 Grammy Award for Best Classical Compendium.

== Reception ==
Professional ratings
Review scores
Source	Rating
AllMusic	4/5 stars
BBC Music Magazine	2/5 stars
Choir & Organ	5/5 stars

== Track listing ==
No.	Title	Lyrics adapted from poem(s) by	Length
1.	"Flocks a Mile Wide"		5:16
2.	"The Saddest Noise" (featuring Voces8)	Emily Dickinson	4:31
3.	"Bird Raptures" (featuring Voces8)	Christina Rossetti	4:46
4.	"A Hundred Thousand Birds" (featuring Voces8)	Christina Rossetti	2:48
5.	"Wild Swans" (featuring Voces8)	Edna St. Vincent Millay	4:10
6.	"Intermezzo"		1:58
7.	"Thus in the Winter" (featuring Voces8)	Edna St. Vincent Millay	3:56
8.	"There Will Come Soft Rains" (featuring Voces8)	Sara Teasdale	5:25
9.	"All That Could Never Be Said" (featuring Voces8)	Sara Teasdale	2:22
10.	"I Shall Not See the Shadows" (featuring Voces8)	Christina Rossetti and Emily Dickinson	4:07
11.	"In the End" (featuring Voces8)	Sara Teasdale	1:35
12.	"Hope Is the Thing with Feathers" (featuring Voces8)	Emily Dickinson	4:46

== Charts ==
The Lost Birds débuted on Billboard's Traditional Classical Albums chart at rank 2 for the week of October 15, 2022.

Chart	Peak position
US Traditional Classical Albums (Billboard)	2
