= The Drop That Contained the Sea =

Studio album by Christopher Tin
- Released: 8 May 2014
- Genre: World
- Length: 57:24
- Label: Tin Works

Christopher Tin chronology
Calling All Dawns (2009)	The Drop That Contained the Sea (2014)	To Shiver the Sky (2020)

The Drop That Contained the Sea is a classical crossover album by Christopher Tin released in 2014. It premiered on April 13, 2014 at Carnegie Hall and debuted at #1 on the Billboard Traditional Classical Albums chart on May 24.

The album consists of 10 commissioned works based on the theme of water, each sung in a different language. All tracks are composed and conducted by Christopher Tin and performed by the Royal Philharmonic Orchestra. The Angel City Chorale performed for many of the tracks.

== Track listing ==
No.	Title	Language	Length
1.	"Water Prelude (feat. Angel City Chorale)"	Proto-Indo-European	1:34
2.	"Haktan Gelen Şerbeti (feat. Kardeş Türküler)"	Turkish	3:57
3.	"Temen Oblak (feat. Le Mystère des Voix Bulgares)"	Bulgarian	7:11
4.	"Iza Ngomso (feat. Soweto Gospel Choir)"	Xhosa	4:07
5.	"Tsas Narand Uyarna (feat. Nominjin)"	Mongolian	4:01
6.	"Passou o Verão (feat. Dulce Pontes)"	Portuguese	6:28
7.	"Devipravaha (feat. Roopa Mahadevan)"	Sanskrit	4:39
8.	"Seirenes (feat. Anonymous 4)"	Ancient Greek	8:47
9.	"Haf Gengr Hriðum (feat. Schola Cantorum)"	Old Norse	4:27
10.	"Waloyo Yamoni (feat. Soweto Gospel Choir)"	Lango	12:13

== Charts ==
Chart	Peak position
US Traditional Classical Albums (Billboard)	1
US World Albums (Billboard)	6
US Classical Albums (Billboard)	2
US Heatseekers Albums (Billboard)	18
