= Zurcaroh =

Austrian acrobatic show group

- Show type: Acrobatic dance
- Date of premiere: 2007
- Location: Austria

Creative team
- Director & choreographer: Peterson da Cruz Hora
- Official website

Zurcaroh (pronounced ZOO-CA-ROW) is an acrobatic show group based in Götzis, Vorarlberg (Austria), and directed by Brazilian choreographer Peterson da Cruz Hora. The group became internationally known after they won a golden buzzer on the 2017 season of France's Got Talent and again in 2018 on season 13 of America's Got Talent, when they finished second overall.

== History ==
Peterson da Cruz Hora, a choreographer from São Paulo, originally founded the group in 2007 in Brazil. In 2009, after moving to Austria, he decided to refound the group there with a local crew. Their first international appearance as an Austrian group occurred in 2011, in Lausanne, Switzerland.

Some of the moves and routines are unique or rarely seen in dance routines. These include multiple flips at once and circus style trapeze acts. One move has two dancers doing cartwheel-style somersaults off the ground, landing each revolution on fellow performers' arms. Another has a dancer acting as a jump rope. Peterson explained why it was important for the troupe to audition for AGT, "Because this is the biggest stage in the world where we can share our skills and our talent." He went on to say how the group accepts dancers, gymnasts, and acrobats at all levels. As of May 2018, there were 31 members in the troupe. They are based in Götzis, a town in the highly populated Rhine valley in the west of Austria.

== Performances ==
Zurcaroh represented Austria at World Gymnaestrada in Helsinki in July 2015; the event is held every four years.

Zurcaroh earned a golden buzzer from David Ginola in 2017 on season 12 of La France a un incroyable talent (France has incredible talent), warranting their participation in the finals.

=== America's Got Talent ===
The group performed on the first show of season 13 of America's Got Talent in 2018. The act consisted of "daring acrobatics and precise synchronicity." Afterwards, each of the judges reacted favorably to the performance. Simon Cowell called it "incredible" and "breathtaking." Host Tyra Banks gave them a golden buzzer, which allowed them to advance directly to the live shows.

In the quarterfinals, Zurcaroh conducted a dance piece based on the Biblical story of Adam and Eve. It was once again favorably received. So was their performance in the semifinals, which had an Ancient Egyptian theme. Journalist Carolyn Lipka wrote this about Zurcaroh following the semifinals performance:

Basically, nothing comes close to comparing to the kind of show this group puts on—the shapes, the complexity, and the detail in every aspect of the performance is mind-blowing.

In the finals, Zurcaroh performed a routine to Baba Yetu. The performance was set in a jungle and featured their usual acrobatic maneuvers. It received the loudest applause from the crowd out of the ten acts that performed that night. The first judge to comment after the performance, Howie Mandel, had his voice almost completely drowned out by applause from the audience.

In the end, Zurcaroh finished second as runner up to magician Shin Lim.

=== Eurovision Song Contest ===
The group performed in the first semi-final of the 2026 Eurovision Song Contest. The performance told the tale of Austria’s oldest amusement park, Bohemian Prater.
