= Civilization IV: Warlords =

- Developer: Firaxis Games
- Publishers: 2K Games (Win); Aspyr (Mac)
- Composer: Jeff Briggs
- Series: Civilization
- Engine: Gamebryo
- Platforms: Microsoft Windows, Mac OS X
- Release: NA: July 24, 2006; EU/AU: July 28, 2006
- Genre: Turn-based strategy
- Modes: Single player, multiplayer

Sid Meier's Civilization IV: Warlords is the first expansion pack of the turn-based strategy video game Civilization IV.

== Gameplay ==
Warlords added many new features to the original game. These include:

- A new category of Great People known as "Great Generals".
- The ability to institute vassal states.
- Eight new scenarios.
- Six new leaders and civilization playable in single-player and multiplayer.
  - Brennus (the Celts)
  - Shaka (the Zulu)
  - Ragnar (the Vikings)
  - Hannibal (Carthage)
  - Wang Kon (Korea)
  - Mehmed II (the Ottomans)
- Four new leaders for existing civilizations.
  - Stalin (Russia)
  - Churchill (England)
  - Ramesses II (Egypt)
  - Augustus (Rome)
- Three new leader traits (Charismatic, Protective and Imperialistic).
- Unique buildings for each civilization.
- Three new wonders.
- New units, resources, and improvements.
- Core gameplay tweaks and additions.
- Inclusion of all patches released for original Civilization IV.

The game introduces a new type of "Great Person" unit, known as a Great General. Great Generals are usually created when the total experience earned by a civilization's military units against other civilizations reaches specified thresholds, rather than Great Person points generated by its cities. In addition, the civilization that acquires the "Fascism" technology first receives a free Great General. A Great General can be used similarly to other Great Persons: to join a city as a "Great Military Instructor", which gives +2 experience points to any military unit created in the city, or to create a Military Academy, which permanently boosts military unit production (by +50%) in the city. The Great General can also be attached to a military unit forming a joint unit led by the Warlord, sharing 20 experience points with all units in its square and giving the Warlord unit free upgrades and exclusive access to special promotions. In all normal games and most scenarios, a destroyed Warlord unit is lost permanently. However, in the Alexander and Genghis Khan scenarios, the title characters serve as Great Generals, and if either is lost, he will be reborn in his civilization's capital city after several turns.

The new Vassal States feature allows players to take up other empires as "vassals," the game's equivalent of protectorates. When an empire becomes a vassal, it loses the ability to declare war and make peace independently, and may be called upon to pay "tribute" in the form of game resources to its "master" (suzerain) state in return for the promise that its master will protect the vassal. Players can use Vassal States to achieve a Domination Victory, since half the vassal's land and population count towards a domination victory for the master, but not vice versa. Similarly, if the master goes to war with another civilization, the vassal too has to go to war. However, other countries' opinions of you will worsen if you have a vassal they dislike. The vassal may still reject trades for gold and technologies.

During peacetime, civilizations can offer their vassalage in return for protection from an enemy, but it may be ended if the state's relative land and population statistics change. Vassal agreements signed in a state of mutual war, as part of a peace treaty, are considered capitulation and bind both parties. The agreement is terminated, however, if the vassal acquires 50% more land area than the master or the vassal loses half of the land it held when the agreement was signed. The only way a master can terminate the agreement is if the vassal refuses to pay tribute. The master can then choose to declare war.

In order to make the civilizations more distinctive, every civilization has received a "Unique Building". These unique buildings replace the standard buildings, and grant special advantages.

New civilizations include Carthage, the Celts, Korea, the Ottoman Empire, the Vikings, and the Zulu. Four new leaders are introduced for existing civilizations. Three new leader traits are introduced, and many existing leader traits have been changed.

Warlords includes new music and also features older music directly from Civilization III and Civilization III: Conquests, which augment the game's existing ancient and classical era music that had relatively few selections. The new opening theme is a Lebanese love song entitled "Al Nadda".

== Reception ==
The expansion received generally positive reviews. Metacritic, which gives a weighted score to games, gave the expansion an 84/100, while Game Rankings gave the expansion an 82.80%
