= Calling All Dawns =

Studio album by Christopher Tin
- Released: 1 October 2009
- Genre: World
- Length: 45:54
- Label: Tin Works

Christopher Tin chronology
| Calling All Dawns (2009) | The Drop That Contained the Sea (2014) |

Calling All Dawns is a classical crossover album by Christopher Tin released in 2009. The album won two Grammys at the 53rd Grammy Awards for Best Classical Crossover Album and Best Instrumental Arrangement Accompanying Vocalist(s) for the song "Baba Yetu", the theme for the 2005 video game Civilization IV. The win marked the first time in history that a Grammy had been awarded to a composition written for a video game.

The album is a song cycle in three movements: day, night, and dawn, corresponding to life, death, and rebirth, respectively.

Twelve songs are featured on the album, each sung in a different language. Many of the lyrics find their sources in important pieces of world literature, including excerpts of long works such as the Hebrew Bible, the Bhagavad Gita, and The Rubaiyat of Omar Khayyam, and also smaller verses such as the Lord's Prayer, Māori proverbs, and Japanese haiku. The album features a similarly diverse set of vocal traditions, including Beijing opera, Irish keening, and African choral music.

The UK premiere of Kia Hora Te Marino was in Bath Abbey on 10 May 2014, at a concert in aid of the Royal British Legion.

== Track listing ==
| No. | Title | Language | Length |
|---|---|---|---|
| 1. | "Baba Yetu (feat. Soweto Gospel Choir & Royal Philharmonic Orchestra)" | Swahili | 3:30 |
| 2. | "Mado Kara Mieru (feat. Lia, Aoi Tada, Kaori Omura)" | Japanese | 4:45 |
| 3. | "Dao Zai Fan Ye (feat. Jia Ruhan)" | Mandarin | 3:15 |
| 4. | "Se É Pra Vir Que Venha (feat. Dulce Pontes)" | Portuguese | 4:14 |
| 5. | "Rassemblons-Nous" | French | 4:27 |
| 6. | "Lux Aeterna" | Latin | 3:59 |
| 7. | "Caoineadh (feat. Anonymous 4)" | Irish | 5:44 |
| 8. | "Hymn Do Trójcy Świętej (feat. Frederica von Stade)" | Polish | 6:48 |
| 9. | "Hayom Kadosh (feat. Cait McWhir)" | Hebrew | 1:45 |
| 10. | "Hamsáfár (feat. Sussan Deyhim)" | Farsi | 2:52 |
| 11. | "Sukla-Krsne (feat. Roopa Mahadevan)" | Sanskrit | 2:01 |
| 12. | "Kia Hora Te Marino" | Māori | 3:18 |
