= Nominjin =

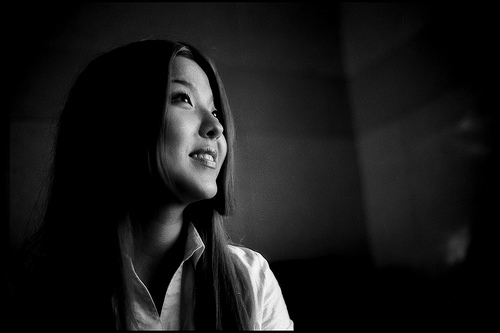

Background information
- Born: Номинжин; November 9, 1989 (age 36)
- Origin: Mongolia
- Genres: Rhythm and blues, Soul, Fusion
- Occupations: Singer; songwriter
- Instrument: Vocals
- Label: None
- Website: www.voiceofmongolia.com

Nominjin (Mongolian: Номинжин), is a Mongolian-American, multi-lingual singer and songwriter. She has performed in more than 15 countries as a solo singer on stages such as Stern Auditorium of Carnegie Hall, David Geffen Hall of Lincoln Center and Welsh National Opera Orchestra at Llangollen. She speaks four languages and sings in 15 languages (English, Russian, Hindi, French, Korean, Chinese, Hebrew, Japanese, Spanish, Vietnamese etc.)

== Early life ==
Raised by her American father and Mongolian mother, she resides in Los Angeles and has spent her early childhood in Russia, Mongolia, India, and the Caribbean due to her parents' work; as a result, she speaks fluent English and Mongolian and several other languages including Russian and Malayalam.

== Career ==
Nominjin launched her career at age 14 after studying under vocal coach Roger Love. She has performed in Russia, the US, the UK, Turkey, India, the Caribbean, Singapore, South Korea, France, Mexico, Japan, China, Hong Kong, Taiwan, and Thailand.

Nominjin was featured on the John Lennon tribute album Peace, Love & Truth. by Yoko Ono/EMI in 2005. In 2007, Nominjin's version of “Take Me To Your Heart” that she recorded with the National Morin Khuur Ensemble of Mongolia was included on the EMI album “Love: Best of Ten Years” alongside multi-platinum selling artists such as Christina Aguilera, Toni Braxton, Norah Jones and Ricky Martin.

In April 2014, two-time Grammy-winning composer Christopher Tin, invited Nominjin to perform at Carnegie Hall's Stern Auditorium as a soloist in five languages (Mongolian, Japanese, Chinese, Persian, and Sanskrit) with a 600-person choir and 300 person orchestra. New York concert reviewers praised Nominjin for her soulful voice and passionate performance. Tin's album, A Drop That Contained The Sea, which Nominjin was a part of with her original Mongolian poem “Tsas Narand Uyarna” debuted at #1 on Billboard Classical charts in May, 2014.

On May 23, 2015, Nominjin was appointed as a Goodwill Envoy for Public Diplomacy by Yun Byung-se, the Minister of Foreign Affairs of Republic of Korea, for the term of two years.

In April 2016, Christopher Tin invited Nominjin to perform at Lincoln Center's David Geffen Hall as a soloist in 4 languages (Japanese, Chinese, Persian, and Sanskrit) with a 600-person choir and 300 person orchestra. New York concert reviewers again praised Nominjin for her passionate performance. The audience reacted to the performance with the loudest and longest standing ovation the reviewer had ever heard at a concert.

In the summer of 2017, Nominjin was a headline performer at the Gala Concert of the 70th Anniversary of the Llangollen International Musical Eisteddfod. Nominjin joined Christopher Tin, the national Welsh National Opera Orchestra and a mass choir made up of singers from Wales, South Africa, Taiwan, and the United States. The concert was filmed and subsequently broadcast on Welsh television station S4C and the BBC.

== Personal life ==
=== Veganism and animal rights ===
She was selected as one of PETA's sexiest vegetarian celebrities and has done numerous campaigns promoting compassionate lifestyle. Nominjin has worked with PETA with many international pro-vegan and anti-fur ad campaigns. In 2020, Nominjin supported PETA's international campaign against cashmere cruelty.

The multi-awarding winning documentary "Eating our Way to Extinction" featured Nominjin as their narrator on the version released to the Mongolian market.
