= Offworld Trading Company =

2016 video game

- Developer: Mohawk Games
- Publisher: Stardock
- Engine: Unity
- Platforms: Microsoft Windows, macOS
- Release: April 28, 2016
- Genre: Real-time strategy
- Modes: Single-player, multiplayer

Offworld Trading Company is a real-time strategy (RTS) tycoon video game developed by Mohawk Games and published by Stardock. The game was released for Microsoft Windows and OS X in April 2016.

== Gameplay ==
Offworld Trading Company is a science fiction themed real-time strategy video game set on Mars. Featuring economic warfare ranging from hostile takeovers to sabotage, it puts the player in charge of one of four titular offworld trading companies. The players' choice of faction comes after they have their first look at the map, allowing them to tailor their choices to the situation. Regardless of their choice, players land their HQ and begin to construct resource extractors on the neighboring hexes.

There are 13 resources in the game. Water, Aluminum, Iron, Silicon, and Carbon can be extracted from hexes that contain those resources. Power can be generated by building a power plant, with different limitations depending on the type of power plant being built, and is usually used to power buildings. Steel mills generate steel from iron. Greenhouse farms make food from water. Hydrolysis reactors break water apart into oxygen and fuel. Glass kilns produce glass from oxygen and silicon. Electronics factories produce electronics from silicon, carbon, and aluminum. Chemical refineries produce chemicals from carbon and fuel. Finally, money can be produced by selling stockpiles of resources.

Supply and demand fluctuates constantly. If a player is buying large sums of glass for an expansion, their rival could be gearing up glass kilns to make a handsome profit. The game also offers more direct ways of engaging a player. Through the black market, a player can purchase anything from underground nukes that wipe out resource pockets to mutinies that divert a rival's wealth into their pocket. When a player purchases something from the black market, however, its price rises, giving a wary opponent a chance to prepare a defense, usually in the form of a goon squad. The goon squad protects a single structure from most sabotage actions, capable of stealing the sabotage for yourself.

The end goal of the game is to buy a majority stake in every offworld trading company in the game. If a player loses majority stockholdership in their own company, or is subjected to a very expensive hostile takeover, they are eliminated from the game, but can elect to watch as an observer. Players are warned when an opposing player earns enough money to buy them out (but the opposing player is not alerted), which usually results in tense, desperate races to earn money.

== Development and release ==
Offworld Trading Company was developed by Mohawk Games and published by Stardock. An in-development version of the game was released via early access. The full game was released for Windows and OS X on April 28, 2016.

The game's score was written by Christopher Tin.

== Reception ==
Reception

Aggregate score
Aggregator	Score
Metacritic	78/100

Review scores
Publication	Score
Computer Games Magazine	7/10
Eurogamer	Recommended
GameSpot	9/10
IGN	8/10
PC Gamer (US)	88/100
VentureBeat	78/100

Offworld Trading Company received "generally favorable" reviews, according to aggregate review website Metacritic.
