= Maytree (band) =

South Korean a cappella group

- Origin: South Korea
- Genre: A cappella
- Years active: 2000–present
- Label: Auriga Inc.
- Members: Jang Sang-in; Basso Kim; Young Song; Daejong; LaYoung
- Past members: Choi Hong-seok; Chon Song-hyun; Choi Soo-bin; Kim Jung-hoon; Choi Kyung-young; Park Ji-eun; Yoon Do-hyun; Jung Da-young; Kang Soo-kyung; Kwon Young-hoon; Kim Won-jong; Lim Su-yeon
- Website: www.youtube.com/@MayTreeOfficial

Maytree (메이트리) is a South Korean a cappella group project led by Sang In Jang. The group was most notable to English speaking audiences in the five-member group era from 2017 to 2026 when the members were Sang-in (S.I.) Jang, Soo-kyung (Soo) Kang, Young-hoon (Hoony) Kwon, Won-jong Kim, and Su-yeon (Erika) Lim. The group's members composed and arranged most of their songs. They released numerous sound effect a cappella videos such as Squid Game medley on YouTube and TikTok, which have made them popular. As of 2026, the group went through a massive restructuring effort, as the group aims to hire new members, starting a "Season 2" of the project.

== History ==
=== Formation of the group (2000-2006) ===
The group was started in 2000 by the members of the university a cappella club called "Gigahitz" where they created a 6-member group called "Mi wansung (美완성, a pun on the Korean word that means incomplete and describes that they are beautifully complete). Three members of this original lineup left the group for personal reasons, and three new members Kim Jung-hoon (then baritone) Park Ji-eun (then soprano) and Choi Kyung-young (then tenor) joined the group to form their first lineup as 6-member group Maytree led by Jang Sang-in and Choi Hong-seok and released their first album "Maybe" in 2005. Even during these early days they appeared in commercials in South Korea.

=== Frequent member changes (2006-2017) ===
At some point, soprano Park Ji-eun left the group and was replaced with Han Yeon-joo, earliest attestations from 2007 through their ad finding a new high tenor to replace former member Kim Jung-hoon (the lineup originally had a high tenor and second tenor) and Kang Su-kyong seems to have been alto. (Note: Member called Yoon Do-hyun replaced Kim. Yoon also left the group some time around 2010, making the group into a 5-member group) New member Choi Soo-bin replaced Han Yeon-joo and Chon Song-hyun replaced Choi Kyung-young in 2008. Jung Da-young and Kim Won-jong replaced two members Choi Hong-seok and Choi Soo-bin some time around 2014 to 2015. Lim Su-yeon became a member some time around 2016. Kwon Young-hoon replaced Chon Song-hyun in 2017.

=== Sound effects and other covers (2021-2026) ===
In 2021, the group began releasing a series of YouTube videos in which it covers sound effects used in computer and mobile phone systems. The first video, released in January 2021, covered Windows sound effects. Others followed, including sound effects for iPhones and Samsung Galaxy phones, as well as the Angry Birds and other video games. The group then released covers of the introductory music for various major film distributors as well as others such as the music for the UEFA Champions League. These covers have generated a significant amount of attention for Maytree. For example, the iPhone covers, released on February 5, 2021, have generated (as of December 23, 2022) nearly 80 million views on YouTube. On October 1, 2021, at the height of the explosion of popularity of the South Korean show Squid Game, which became Netflix's most popular ever series, Maytree released covers of some of the main themes from the show. As of December 23, 2022, the video has amassed over 260 million views on YouTube. From February 10 to 13, 2026, all of their videos were privatized.

=== Season 2 (2026-present) ===
On April 16, 2026, it was revealed that this move was part of a relaunch of the project, replacing the former members (excluding Jang Sang-in) with a new group of members to restore its a capella identity and start a "Season 2" of the project.

The other four members reclaim the name MayTree too and said that there was no consent to take down their videos.

In September 2026, three of the former four members (Kang Soo-kyung, Kwon Young-hoon, and Kim Won-jong) released four videos on the YouTube channel "라펠카 LAPELLCA".

== Members ==
The current members of the group are:

- Jang Sang-in, vocal percussion
- Basso Kim, bass
- Choi Young Song, tenor
- Dajeong, alto
- LaYoung, soprano

Former members that were recognizable from the famous videos from 2021 to 2026 were:

- Kang Soo-kyung, alto
- Kwon Young-hoon, tenor
- Kim Won-jong, bass
- Lim Su-yeon, soprano

== Discography ==
=== Studio albums ===
- 2006: Maytree
- 2015: Maytree in Love (메이트리 인 러브)
- 2020: To Me Again (그대 내게 다시)
- 2024: Y-MayTree Minecraft

=== EPs ===
- 2011: The MayTree
- 2013: 5028

=== Singles ===
- 2021: When Snowflakes Fell on Your Head (임수연)
- 2021: What If (Andrea Figallo, Eddi Hüneke, Junko Kamei)
- 2022: Extraordinary Attorney Woo Pt7 - Flash -
- 2022: Carol of the Bells
- 2023: Gimme Toxic
- 2023: 夢のような日が
- 2023: My Ordinary Christmas
- 2024: Real New Year
- 2024: Water in the World
- 2024: Cantina Band
- 2024: MOM
- 2024: Mr. Moustafa
- 2024: Augustus Gloop
- 2024: Get Lucky
- 2024: Psycho
- 2024: MayTris-Mas
- 2025: Love Is Coming
- 2025: Grandpa of Mountain
- 2025: Missing Bees
- 2026: 真夜中のドア~~Stay with me~~

== Awards and nominations ==
- 2009 3rd prize at the International A Cappella Competition
- 2010 2nd prize at the International A Cappella Competition
- 2011 Busan Choral International Competition - 1st prize of Popular Music category
- 2011 Vokal Total International Competition (Graz), Gold Diploma
- 2013 Yeosu Choral International Competition - 1st prize of Pop & Jazz category
- 2014 World Choir Games - 2 Gold Medals of Jazz category and Pop choral category
- 2018 Moscow A Capella Festival - 2nd place
