= Civilization IV =

2005 video game

- Developer: Firaxis Games
- Publishers: 2K (Win); Aspyr (Mac)
- Producer: Barry Caudill
- Designer: Soren Johnson
- Programmer: Soren Johnson
- Artist: Steve Ogden
- Composers: Jeffery L. Briggs; Christopher Tin
- Series: Civilization
- Engine: Gamebryo
- Platforms: Windows, Mac OS X
- Release: Windows: NA: October 25, 2005; PAL: November 4, 2005; Mac OS X: NA: June 26, 2006
- Genres: Turn-based strategy, 4X
- Modes: Single-player, multiplayer

Civilization IV (also known as Sid Meier's Civilization IV) is a 2005 4X turn-based strategy video game developed by Firaxis Games and published by 2K. It is the fourth installment of the Civilization series and was designed by Soren Johnson. It was released in North America, Europe, and Australia, between October 25 and November 4, 2005, and followed by Civilization V.

Civilization IV uses the 4X empire-building model for turn-based strategy gameplay, in which the player's main objective is to construct a civilization from limited initial resources. Most standard full-length games start the player with a settler unit and/or a city unit in 4000 BC. As with other games in the series, there are by default five objectives the player can pursue in order to finish the game: conquering all other civilizations; controlling a supermajority of the game world's land and population; building and sending the first sleeper ship to the Alpha Centauri star system; increasing the "Culture ratings" of at least three cities to "legendary" levels; or winning a "World Leader" popularity contest by the United Nations. If the time limit for the game is reached and none of the previous goals has been fulfilled by any players including game AI players, the civilization with the highest total game score is declared winner. A large departure from earlier Civilization games is a new graphics engine created from scratch, based on the Gamebryo engine by Numerical Design Limited (NDL).

The game has received critical acclaim and was hailed as an exemplary product of one of the leading video game producers in the turn-based strategy genre, and has been listed as one of the best video games of all time. Civilization IV sold over 3 million copies by 2008 and won multiple awards, including several Game of the Year awards. Its title song, "Baba Yetu", was the first piece of video game music to win a Grammy Award. Two major expansions were released, Civilization IV: Warlords and Civilization IV: Beyond the Sword, as well as the stand-alone expansion pack Civilization IV: Colonization, which were all combined in 2009 into one release edition titled Sid Meier's Civilization IV: The Complete Edition.

== Gameplay ==
Civilization IV follows some of the 4X model of turn-based strategy games, a genre in which players control an empire and "explore, expand, exploit, and exterminate", by having the player attempt to lead a modest group of people from a base with initially scarce resources into a successful empire or civilization. The condition for winning the game is accomplished through one of the five ways: militarily defeating all other civilizations in the game world, controlling over two-thirds of the game world's land and population, building the first spaceship in the Space Age and sending it to Alpha Centauri, having the most dominant Culture ratings over other civilizations, or becoming "World Leader" through the United Nations votes. Additionally, there are multiple game scores for each civilization throughout the game based on the actions of each civilization and a number of factors, allowing for a win condition based on the total of these points if the game timer runs out. The game can be played in multiple modes: as a single player facing against one or more computer-controlled opponents, in hot seat mode, or through online multiplayer games.

As with other turn-based strategy video games, the player can customize the look and feel of their game world as well as the difficulty of any game AI players before the game starts. Each map space has a terrain type, such as plains, tundra, or desert, that affects the available resources players can extract from their environments and the movements of certain units through that terrain. The player is then given 34 civilizations to choose from, each with their own pros and cons, plus a leader avatar, an initial set of civilization technology, and any units unique to that civilization. When the game starts, however, it chooses random locations to place across a predefined square grid map. Like other strategy games, Civilization IV has a fog of war feature, in which unexplored territory remains darkened and territories without any units stationed on its designated square is shaded with darker colors.

=== Units and combat ===
Example of some of the units and 3D graphics unique to Civilization IV

Most units that the player can generate and use are military units, with certain attributes such as combat strength and movement rate particular to each military type. Each unit can gain experience through combat, which later translates into promotions that the player can use to assign military units new bonuses. Initially, most combat takes place on land, but further advancements in the game's technology tree can allow the player to build ships and planes with which to fight battles on sea and in the air. Any number of units can be stacked onto a single space and move as a group if so assigned, but the overall combat phase is resolved by one-on-one unit battles.

Combat is initiated when moving military units are moved onto the square occupied by an opposing force's military units and cities, and combat is then resolved with calculating statistics of each unit combined with some random chance. Defeated units are removed from the game (apart from workers and settlers, which are captured by the attacking force), and any attacking units that are able to defeat the last defending military unit on a space will move to occupy that space. If the space is occupied by a city the player may choose to occupy and capture the city as their own or raze it. Other than combat, military units can also be assigned to fortify a specific space, perform sentry duties, destroy enemy city improvements, or explore the game world.

Non-military units include settlers who are used to found cities, workers who are used to improve space and gather resources, spies who can perform counterintelligence and espionage, and religious missionaries who can be sent to convert different civilizations and cities. Also, with the Beyond the Sword expansion, new units are added such as executives, who can spread corporations to new cities. Throughout the game, players may also generate a special unit called a "Great Person". These are named after historical figures and can be used for one-time advantage boosts in various ways; examples include Great Engineers who increase overall production levels and Great Scientists who improve technology. Assigning inhabitants of cities to work as 'specialists' (scientists, engineers, artists, spies, merchants or priests), building certain wonders or discovering certain technologies can improve the rate at which Great People are generated. Great Generals are generated when a player's forces achieve a certain number of victories, and can be used either to give a small amount of extra experience to all units trained in a city, or a very high level of experience to one unit. However, like other units, Great People of all kinds can be attacked and killed before the players can use them.

=== Resources and buildings ===
Once a city is founded, it will automatically begin extracting resources from surrounding spaces; the amount of spaces it can extract from is determined by the city's population size. The game automatically allocates the spaces a city uses and how its resources are maintained as the city grows, but the player is free to manage the city directly. This feature can be utilized to turn a part of the population into one of several specialized occupations; at the cost of having one less space from the city, these specialists increase gathering and production of the resources of their targeted specializations.

Each city can only produce one military unit or one building at a time; any additional units or buildings are placed into a queue. The rate of construction is determined by the amount of material collected from the surrounding spaces; players can also choose to speed production by sacrificing gold or population if they adopt the required governmental policy; called civics. The player can instead specialize the city towards gathering a particular resource instead of constructing additional units or buildings. Also, in order to produce some units or buildings, certain resources must be collected within the empire and connected to the empires trade network by roads or harbours (for example, horses are needed for mounted units, and iron for swords, while stone or marble increase production of certain Wonders.).

Buildings perform any number of different functions depending on building type; for example, early buildings such as granaries improve food storage to boost the city's growth and barracks produce better military units, while later buildings such as factories increase general production levels. There are also a number of unique buildings throughout the game. Most notable are World Wonders, which can be accessed through research nodes in the technology tree and construction through the worker unit. World Wonders provide advantages that are unique to each civilization, as they are limited to only one or two players.

Through buildings and specialists, each city also generates the "Culture" resource that contributes towards both the area upon which the city can influence for extracting resources and the overall civilization's cultural value. When two cities of different civilizations are adjacent to each other, the culture values of each city influences the space they can control; it is even possible that a city close to another civilization's city will join that civilization if their culture is strong enough. The high levels of culture gathering and attainment are also one of the default conditions that can be used to win the game.

=== Technology, government and religion ===
A screenshot of Civics option menu in Civilization IV

Once the first city has been founded, the player can select their first technology node from the game's technology tree to research, once the required number of research points have been accumulated, the technology is obtained. As with other types of technology trees, more advanced technology nodes require the research of other previous technology nodes. The player can also select a future technology and immediately place into the game queue any technology nodes between the current technology level and the specified technology node. Technology can also determine another win condition; several endgame technology nodes are required to develop a colony ship to reach Alpha Centauri.

Within the technology tree are technology nodes relating to government civics and state religions, each with their own pros and cons. The player has the option of selecting which set of government civics or state religions that the player wants their civilization to follow, but not all civics and religions can be encompassed.

Once the player has formally met another civilization, they can perform diplomacy at any time. For example, if the two civilizations are on friendly terms, the player can ask to trade units and/or technology for gold and vice versa, or request opening of national borders in order to freely explore in the other civilization's territories. The player can also use the diplomacy menu to request help in a war against a third civilization, or formally declare war on any civilization in which they engage diplomacy.

Religion plays a much more important role in Civilization IV than in the previous installments of the franchise. Impacting many of the game's key mechanics like government civics and diplomatic relations, the game's new religious system, according to Firaxis Games producer Barry Caudill, was added to increase gameplay depth over the entire game. The game features seven religions (Buddhism, Christianity, Confucianism, Hinduism, Islam, Judaism, and Taoism) that are founded by the first civilization to research a certain technology which varies per religion. Religions can then be spread actively through the production of missionary units or passively through means such as trade routes. Religions may be spread to domestic and foreign cities and there is no limit to the number of religions that can be present in any single city. The player may only choose one state religion at a time and all seven offer identical advantages (e.g. cities with the state religion receive bonuses in happiness, and potentially in production, science, gold and even military unit experience points).

=== Customization ===
Civilization IV is much more open to modification than its predecessors were. Game data and rules are stored in XML files, and a Software Development Kit was released in April 2006 to allow customization of game AI. The map editor supports Python.

The World Builder allows a player to either design a map from scratch or edit a preloaded template map as a starting point for a new game. The player can modify the map by placing and modifying any number of rivers, landmasses, mountains, resources, units, and cities, as well as their attributes such as Culture generation. The World Builder for Civilization IV is in-game, in contrast to previous Civilization games where the Map Editor was an external application.

More game attributes are stored in XML files, which can be edited with an external text editor or application. On September 20, 2005, Firaxis Games senior producer Barry Caudill stated that "[e]diting these files will allow players to tweak simple game rules and change or add content. For instance, they can add new unit or building types, change the cost of wonders, or add new civilizations. Players can also change the sounds played at certain times or edit the play list for your soundtrack."

The Civilization IV software development kit was released on April 13, 2006, to coincide with the release of the v1.61 patch. The kit allows players to view, modify, or even completely re-write the game's DLL source code, enabling the modification of the game's AI and other integral parts of the game that were previously not accessible.

== Production ==
=== Production and development ===
The game engine for Civilization IV was built entirely from scratch, with some help from NDL's Gamebryo engine. This decision resulted in a full 3D immersion of the game, which was the first in the series, and which allowed easier readability and smoother, more in-depth zooming capabilities. Some of the quotes relating to the technology tree and narration for the game were provided by Leonard Nimoy. The soundtrack for the game features compositions of Medieval, Renaissance, and Baroque origin, and design for the title music was influenced by The Lion King. Composer Christopher Tin wrote the opening theme song "Baba Yetu" (Swahili "Our Father"), a rendition of the Lord's Prayer, which was performed by Stanford University's Talisman A Cappella. The song, when rereleased, became the first piece of video game music to be nominated for and to win a Grammy Award.

=== Mods ===
Sid Meier's Civilization IV also released some bonus content, mainly to show modding capabilities:

- Earth – This is the world map of the game, based on the Robinson projection of the Earth in order to optimize its size. 124x68 tiles large, it features just 9 ancient civilizations. An 18 civilizations version of this mod was later released which won the first prize at a GameFlood modding contest.
- Earth Ice Age – This map is set in the world during the last ice age (20,000 years before present), with 11 randomly picked civilizations.
- Greek World – To reenact the classical Mediterranean, a special map was made, based on Hecataeus' map of the world as it was known by the Greeks. Extra detail was also borrowed from other ancient sources such as Homer, Ptolemy, and Herodotus.
- Rhye's and Fall of Civilization – This mod changes much of the core settings of the game as an attempt at maintaining a sense of historical realism into the game. In order to do this, it introduces other features such as plagues and congresses.
- Fall from Heaven – a total conversion mod that reimagines the game in a dark fantasy setting, built by Derek Paxton. Its sequel Fall from Heaven II became the most downloaded mod on CivFanatics.

=== Civilization Anonymous ===
The game had a viral marketing campaign, revolving around a fictitious self-help organization known as Civilization Anonymous (shortened to CivAnon), the intention being to satirise how addictive the game was. With the slogan "No More Turns", the premise was the following: "Rumors have begun to circulate that the newest edition of the "One More Turn" franchise is on its way. STAY AWAY from this game at all costs. You will likely be powerless to its extreme addictive properties once exposed". Various characters were created, and their scenarios were included in various trailers showing the "inside [of] a Civanon meeting for [Civilization] addicts," the first of which being played during E3 2005 once an hour at the 2K Games booth. These "video testimonials of supposedly recovering Civilization addicts" also featured cameos by Sid Meier. In addition to this, an "official" website was created by 2K Games with extra content. The Civilization Anonymous campaign was brought back for the following game Civilization V. Break described the campaign as "hilarious", while Kotaku described it as a "great promotional campaign" that "comes across as terrifyingly realistic". Destructoid shared this view, saying the support group campaign is "a clever marketing tool", but wishing it existed as "we all know there really are people who suffer from one-more-turn-itis". VantureBeat said the campaign was "incredibly clever and funny", adding "what made it so powerful was not the near-flawless execution and fine detail; it was the fact that it could have been real". 'Ctrl-Alt-Play: Essays on Control in Video Gaming' noted the spoof highlighted the series' "hyper-addictive turn-based gameplay". As part of the Civilization V version of the campaign, 2K Games asked Civilization addicts to submit stories via video in order to win $2,500 and a "framed, limited edition Civilization Anonymous poster signed by Firaxis Games". The 2010 version was "updated for modern concerns, like the franchise's broader audience and iPhone editions of the game acting as a gateway drug."

=== Release ===
Civilization IV was published for the Windows and Mac OS X platforms. Aspyr released the Mac OS X version on June 26, 2006, and a Mac digital version was released January 2010 on gameagent.com. Users who quickly purchased the game after initial release reported having problems playing the game on particular sets of video drivers, which were later resolved by a Firaxis patch, according to GameSpy. By the end of March 2008, the game sold over three million units. Firaxis Games has also published two expansion packs for Civilization IV, entitled Civilization IV: Warlords and Civilization IV: Beyond the Sword. A remake of the original 1994 Sid Meier's Colonization, rebuilt with Civilization IV's game engine and titled Civilization IV: Colonization, was released for Mac and PC as a standalone game and later bundled with the two expansions as Civilization IV: The Complete Edition.

== Reception ==
=== Sales ===
Civilization IV was a commercial success, and sold more than 1 million units by mid-March 2006. By that time, it had held a top-10 position on every weekly computer game sales chart released by The NPD Group since the game's launch. NPD declared Civilization IV the 11th-best-selling computer game of 2005, and it rose to ninth place on the firm's annual computer game sales chart for the following year. It returned to NPD's year-end top 20 in 2008 with a 13th-place finish. The game also received a "Silver" sales award from the Entertainment and Leisure Software Publishers Association (ELSPA), indicating sales of at least 100,000 copies in the United Kingdom. According to Take-Two Interactive, sales of Civilization IV surpassed 3 million units by March 2008.

=== Critical reviews ===
Reception

Aggregate scores
Aggregator	Score
GameRankings	93%
Metacritic	94/100

Review scores
Publication	Score
1Up.com	A
Computer and Video Games	9.2
Eurogamer	9/10
GameRevolution	A−
GameSpot	9.4/10
GameSpy	5/5
IGN	9.4/10

Civilization IV received universal critical acclaim with an aggregate score of 94 on Metacritic and an aggregate score of 93.36% on GameRankings. Critics such as GameSpot's Andrew Park praised not only the improvements in the turn-based strategy genre that carried over from other installments in the series, but also noted the game's more advanced 3D computer graphics, difficult AI opponents, and multiplayer feature. The Times praised the improvements of the 3D engine used to generally build the game, and GameGuru appreciated its ability to zoom onto individual squares. IGN commented that the game AI was much more intelligent than it was in Civilization III, which designer Soren Johnson stated was thanks to their "secret pre-beta group" testing the game before release. Game Revolution remarked that "the multiplayer... actually works this time" and GameSpot added that both "single-player and multiplayer options have been improved in Civ IV."

Though it had received mostly positive feedback, video game critics pointed out functions in the game which could have been improved to enhance their enjoyment of the game. Steve Butts from IGN suggested that in-game announcements about enemy achievements should be displayed more prominently, and that the multiplayer feature could have included "an option to save my username and password." Likewise, GameSpy's Dave Kosak pointed out other flaws of the multiplayer interface, stating that it "is a little rough in places. The built-in server browser, for instance, will keep jumping around the list as you try to find a game." GameSpot also noted the lack of a "religion-based victory condition", which downplayed the influence that the revamped religion system was supposed to have on the game.

In August 2016, Civilization IV placed 11th on Time's The 50 Best Video Games of All Time list. In 2021, PCGamesN ranked it as the best game in the series.

=== Awards ===
Civilization IV won multiple awards at various events and gaming websites.

- IGN chose it as the PC Game of the Year of 2005 over competing titles such as F.E.A.R. and Guild Wars, as the Best Strategy Game (both for PC and overall) and as the Best Online Game of 2005 for PC. In 2006, IGN ranked it first place on The Editor's Top 10 list and second place on the Top 25 PC Games of All Time list.
- GameSpot awarded the game Best Strategy Game and Best PC Game, and it was nominated as an entry for Game of the Year.
- GameSpy named the game Game of the Year, PC Game of the Year, and Best PC Turn-Based Strategy Game of the Year.
- At the 9th Annual Interactive Achievement Awards, Civilization IV won "Strategy Game of the Year", and was nominated for "Computer Game of the Year".
- At the 53rd Annual Grammy Awards of 2010, the song "Baba Yetu", which was written to be the title theme for Civilization IV, won in the Best Instrumental Arrangement Accompanying Vocalist category, because it had been allowed eligibility in the competition through Christopher Tin's inclusion of the song in his subsequent release of his 2009 album Calling All Dawns. This decision made "Baba Yetu" a landmark in video game history as the first Grammy Award nomination and win for any video game theme.

The editors of Computer Games Magazine named Civilization IV the best computer game of 2005, and presented it with their awards for "Best Strategy Game", "Best AI" and "Best Interface". They wrote, "It's a towering achievement, even for a series as revered as this one. Even for long-time fans of the series, playing Civilization IV is like discovering it for the very first time." Civilization IV also won PC Gamer US's "Best Turn-Based Strategy Game 2005" award. The magazine's Dan Stapleton called it "a huge facelift to a winning formula." It was nominated as PC Gamer US's "Best Multiplayer Game 2005" and overall game of the year, but lost in these categories to Battlefield 2.
