= Comparison of widget engines =

This is a comparison of widget engines. This article is not about widget toolkits that are used in computer programming to build graphical user interfaces.

== General ==
| Engine | Creator | Current Version | License | Status |
|---|---|---|---|---|
| Adobe AIR | Adobe Systems | 1.5 | Proprietary | Discontinued |
| AveDesk | Andreas Verhoeven | 1.3 | Proprietary | Abandoned |
| Dashboard | Apple Inc. | 1.8 (July 20, 2011; 14 years ago) [±] | Proprietary | Retired |
| DesktopX | Stardock | 3.5 | Proprietary | Abandoned |
| gDesklets | Martin Grimme and Christian Meyer | 0.36 | GPL | Abandoned |
| Google Desktop Gadgets | Google | 5.0.0701.18382 | Proprietary | Discontinued |
| Kapsules | Andrew Powell | 0.9.9 | Proprietary | Abandoned |
| KlipFolio | Serence | 5.0D | Proprietary | Active and supported |
| Microsoft Gadgets | Microsoft | ? | Proprietary | Discontinued |
| NetFront | Access Co. Ltd. | 4.2 | Proprietary | Discontinued |
| Netvibes | Netvibes | 1.0 | Proprietary | Active and supported |
| Plasma | KDE (Aaron Seigo, main developer) | 4.14.3 (November 11, 2014; 11 years ago) [±] | GPL | Active and Supported |
| Rainmeter | Kimmo 'Rainy' Pekkola | 4.3.1 - r3321 (September 22, 2019; 6 years ago) [±] | GPL | Active and Supported |
| Screenlets | Rico Pfaus (AKA RYX) | 0.1.5 | GPL | Abandoned |
| Serious Samurize | Gustaf & Oscar Lundh | 1.64 | Proprietary | Abandoned |
| SuperKaramba | Hans Karlsson | 0.39 | GPL | Abandoned |
| WebKit | Apple Inc. | ? | BSD+LGPL | Active and supported |
| WidSets | Nokia | ? | Proprietary | Discontinued |
| Yahoo! Widgets | Ed Voas, Michael Galloway, and Sam Magnuson (Note: The Yahoo! Widgets was originally released by Arlo Rose and Ed Voas as Konfabulator. The name was changed several months after Yahoo! acquired the software in July 2005.) | 4.5.2 | Proprietary | Discontinued |
| Engine | Creator | Current Version | License | Status |

== Operating system support ==
| Engine | Mac OS X | Windows NT5 (XP) | Windows NT6 (Vista, 7/8/10+) | Linux | Android |
|---|---|---|---|---|---|
| Adobe AIR | Yes | Yes | Yes | Yes | ? |
| AveDesk | No | Yes | Yes | No | ? |
| Dashboard | Yes (Note: As of El Kapitain the Apple dashboard is no longer enabled by default.) | No | No | No | ? |
| DesktopX | No | Yes | Yes | No | ? |
| gDesklets | No (Note: As for the next major version the gDesklets' developers are planning to support Windows XP and Mac OS X.) | No | No | Yes | ? |
| Google Desktop Gadgets | Yes | Yes | Yes | Yes | ? |
| Kapsules | No | Yes | ? | No | ? |
| KlipFolio | No | Yes | Yes | No | ? |
| Microsoft Gadgets | No | No | Yes | No | ? |
| NetFront | No (Note: NetFront is a Mobile browser, which is also preinstalled on the PSP, and on the PlayStation 3.) | No | No | No | ? |
| Netvibes | Dashboard bridge | Using browser | Using browser | Using browser | ? |
| Plasma | Yes | Yes | Yes | Yes | No |
| Rainmeter | No | No | Yes | No | No |
| Screenlets | No | No | No | Yes | ? |
| Serious Samurize | No | Yes | Yes (Note: The current version of Samurize (1.64.2) runs on Vista but there are a few minor issues that need to be worked out, such as security dialog prompts.) | No | ? |
| SuperKaramba | No | No | No | Yes | ? |
| WebKit | ? | ? | ? | ? | ? |
| WidSets | No (Note: WidSets is for mobiles and runs on the Java MIDP 2.0 platform) | No | No | No | ? |
| Yahoo! Widgets | No | Yes | Yes | No | No |
| Engine | Mac OS X | Windows XP (NT5) | Windows (NT6) Vista+ | Linux | Android |

== Technical ==
=== Languages ===
Which programming languages the engines support. Most engines rely upon interpreted languages.

| Engine | HTML | XHTML | CSS | XML | JavaScript | Perl | Python | Ruby | C++ | Executable | VBScript |
|---|---|---|---|---|---|---|---|---|---|---|---|
| Adobe AIR (Note: Widgets for Adobe Air can also be programmed in Adobe Flash, and Actionscript.) | Yes | Yes | Yes | Yes | Yes | ? | ? | ? | ? | ? | ? |
| AveDesk (Note: AveDesk can be extended using AveScripter, which supports plugins written with XML and Javascript, extended using CSS.) | No | No | Yes | Yes | Yes | No | No | No | Yes | ? | ? |
| Dashboard | Yes | Yes | Yes | Yes | Yes | Yes | Yes | Yes | Yes (Note: Dashboard uses a technology called Cocoa Plugins.This allows for Objective-C code to be used through the plugin. The plugin is written with Cocoa and is compiled.) | Yes | ? |
| DesktopX | Yes | Yes | Yes | Yes | Yes | Yes | Yes | ? | Yes | Yes | ? |
| gDesklets | No | No | No | Yes | No | No | Yes | No | No | No | ? |
| Google Desktop Gadgets | ? | ? | ? | Yes | Yes | No | No | No | No | Yes | ? |
| Kapsules (Note: Widgets for Kapsules and Serious Samurize can be written in any scripting language for which there is an ActiveScript engine, including PHP, JScript, VBScript and Ruby.) | ? | ? | ? | ? | No | Yes | Yes | No | ? | ? | Yes |
| KlipFolio | No | No | Yes (Note: KlipFolio supports custom styles using CSS syntax.) | Yes | Yes | No | No | No | No | No | ? |
| Microsoft Gadgets | Yes | No | Yes | Yes | Yes | No | Yes | Yes | Yes (as ActiveX) | Yes | Yes |
| Netvibes | Yes | Yes | Yes | Yes | Yes | No | No | No | No | No | ? |
| Plasma | Yes | Yes | Yes | Yes | Yes | Yes | Yes | Yes | Yes | ? | ? |
| Rainmeter | No | No | No | No | No | No | No | No | No | No | No |
| Screenlets | Yes | Yes | Yes | ? | No | No | Yes | No | ? | ? | ? |
| Serious Samurize (Note: Samurize supports DLLs compiled with C++, Delphi, PowerBASIC, and FreeBasic, among others. HTML/XML/CSS support can be added by using certain plugins.) | No | No | No | No | Yes | Yes | Yes | Yes | Yes | Yes | Yes |
| SuperKaramba | ? | ? | Yes | Yes | Yes | No | Yes | Yes | Yes | ? | ? |
| WebKit | Yes | Yes | Yes | Yes | Yes | No | No | No | Yes | ? | ? |
| WidSets | ? | ? | ? | ? | ? | ? | ? | ? | ? | ? | ? |
| Yahoo! Widgets (Note: Yahoo! Widget Engine supports Perl and Python indirectly through the use of the shell, provided that the interpreters are installed on the machine (on Mac OS X, they are by default).) | Yes | Yes | Yes | Yes | Yes | No | No | No | No | No (Note: Yahoo! Widgets can interface with COM (windows) or AppleScript (Mac OS)) | No |
| Engine | HTML | XHTML | CSS | XML | JavaScript | Perl | Python | Ruby | C++ | Executable | VBScript |

=== Formats and Development ===
| Engine | IDE | Widget Container | Widget MIME Type |
|---|---|---|---|
| Adobe AIR | Flex Builder 3, Flash CS4, Dreamweaver CS4 | ZIP | application/vnd.adobe.air-application-installer-package+zip |
| AveDesk | AveScripter | ZIP | ? |
| Dashboard | Dashcode | ZIP | application/x-macbinary |
| DesktopX | Desktop X Pro | EXE | ? |
| gDesklets | No | Tar.gz | ? |
| Google Desktop Gadgets | Google Desktop Gadget Designer | ZIP | app/gg |
| Kapsules | ? | ZIP | ? |
| KlipFolio | No | Proprietary XML Format | ? |
| Microsoft Gadgets | No (Note: Microsoft Gadget has documentation, but no IDE to aid development.) | ZIP | application/x-windows-gadget |
| Netvibes | No | Online | ? |
| Plasma | No | ZIP, with plasmoid as extension instead of zip | ? |
| Rainmeter | No | ZIP, with rmskin as extension instead of zip | application/vnd.rainmeter.SkinInstaller |
| Screenlets | No | Tar.gz | ? |
| Serious Samurize | Serious Samurize Config Editor | ZIP | ? |
| SuperKaramba | No | Tar.gz | ? |
| WebKit | No | ? | ? |
| WidSets | ? | ? | ? |
| Yahoo! Widgets | No (Note: Yahoo! Widgets has documentation, but no IDE to aid development. A script was provided to allow Photoshop to be used as the Graphical Designer. The script created a widget whose objects were based upon Photoshop layer sets or groups) | Proprietary Format, ZIP | application/vnd.yahoo.Widget |
| Engine | IDE | Widget Container | Widget MIME Type |

=== Development Tools ===
As widgets are largely combinations of HTML or XHTML, CSS, and Javascript in most cases, standard AJAX tools, such as Eclipse ATF, can be used for development. Specialized tools may give access to additional capabilities supplied by frameworks such as Dojo or Openrico.
