= List of Impulse Reactor and Goo games =

This is a list of video games that were released or upcoming on Stardock Impulse and are using Impulse::Reactor or Impulse Goo. The "Reactor" column indicates titles compatible with Stardock Impulse's Reactor, which include online gaming features. Titles listed under the "Goo" column indicates titles are using Stardock Impulse's user friendly DRM Goo

When a game is released, it should be moved to the appropriate section. This list should not contain vaporware. As Impulse was sold to GameStop in 2011 and discontinued in 2014 this list will likely be static and any upcoming games won't appear on this service.

== 2008 ==
Title	Release date	Developer	Publisher	Reactor	Goo
Assassin's Creed	April 8, 2008	Ubisoft Montreal	Ubisoft	✗	✓
Baseball Mogul 2008	November 5, 2008	Sports Mogul	Enlight	✗	✓
Devil May Cry 4	July 8, 2008	Capcom	Capcom	✗	✓
Heroes of Might and Magic V - Tribes of the East	August 23, 2008	Nival Interactive	Ubisoft	✗	✓
Iron Grip Warlord	November 5, 2008	Isotx	Isotx	✗	✓
King's Bounty The Legend	September 23, 2008	Katauri Interactive	1C Company	✗	✓
Prince of Persia	December 9, 2008	Ubisoft Montreal	Ubisoft	✗	✓
Star Wolves 3 - Civil War	August 22, 2008	X-bow Software	1C Company	✗	✓

== 2009 ==
Title	Release date	Developer	Publisher	Reactor	Goo
Call of Duty 4: Modern Warfare	June 10, 2009	Infinity Ward	Activision	✗	✓
Company of Heroes Tales of Valor	April 9, 2009	Relic	THQ	✗	✓
Dark Fall: Lost Souls	December 3, 2009	Iceberg Interactive	Iceberg Interactive	✗	✓
Demigod	April 14, 2009	Gas Powered Games	Stardock	✓	✗
DroplitZ	June 25, 2009	Blitz Games	Atlus U.S.A	✓	✗
East India Company	July 31, 2009	Nitro Games	Paradox Interactive	✗	✓
Elven Legacy	April 7, 2009	1C Company	Paradox Interactive	✗	✓
Elven Legacy: Ranger	October 19, 2009	1C Company	Paradox Interactive	✗	✓
GUN	November 2, 2009	Neversoft	Activision	✗	✓
Hero's Tale Enhanced Edition	August 31, 2009	Oldschool Games Entertainment	Ivent	✗	✓
King Arthur - The Role-Playing Wargame	November 24, 2009	Neocore Games	Neocore Games	✗	✓
Majesty 2	September 18, 2009	1C Company	Paradox Interactive	✗	✓
Monster Jam	September 30, 2009	Torus Games	Activision	✗	✓
NecroVisioN - Lost Company	September 18, 2009	The Farm 51	1C Company	✗	✓
Prototype	June 9, 2009	Radical Entertainment	Activision	✗	✓
Red Faction: Guerrilla	June 2, 2009	Volition	THQ	✗	✓
Resident Evil 5	September 15, 2009	Capcom	Capcom	✗	✓
Sacraboar	November 6, 2009	Makivision Games	Makivision Games	✓	✗
Street Fighter IV	July 7, 2009	Capcom	Capcom	✗	✓
Sword of The Stars: Argos Naval Yard	June 17, 2009	Kerberos Productions	Paradox Interactive	✗	✓
Sword of The Stars: Complete	June 17, 2009	Kerberos Productions	Paradox Interactive	✗	✓
Sword of The Stars: Ultimate	April 17, 2009	Kerberos Productions	Paradox Interactive	✗	✓
The Settlers: Heritage of Kings	August 10, 2009	Blue Byte	Ubisoft	✗	✓
TimeShift	August 19, 2009	Saber Interactive	Activision	✗	✓

== 2010 ==
Title	Release date	Developer	Publisher	Reactor	Goo
Armada 2526	March 1, 2010	Ntronium Games	Ntronium Games	✗	✓
Blaster Simulator	February 9, 2010	Auran	Auran	✗	✓
Bob Came in Pieces	May 14, 2010	Ludosity Interactive	Ludosity Interactive	✓	✗
Bungee Jumping Simulator	February 10, 2010	Auran	Auran	✗	✓
Call of Juarez	April 9, 2010	Techland	Ubisoft	✗	✓
Clover: A Curious Tale	March 24, 2010	Binary Tweed	Blitz Arcade	✗	✓
Disciples III: Renaissance	June 24, 2010	.dat Media	Kalypso Media	✗	✓
Divinity II: Ego Draconis	January 5, 2010	Larian Studios	CDV	✗	✓
Elemental: War of Magic	August 31, 2010	Stardock	Stardock	✓	✓
Heavyweight Transport Simulator	May 19, 2010	UIG Entertainment	Auran	✗	✓
Konung III: Ties of the Dynasty	June 17, 2010	SkyFallen Entertainment	1C Company	✗	✓
KrissX	January 27, 2010	Regolith Games	Blitz Arcade	✗	✓
Mary Kay Andrews - The Fixer Upper	January 11, 2010	Ocean Media	DigiRonin Games	✗	✓
Military Life Tank Simulator	February 10, 2010	Auran	Auran	✗	✓
Rail Cargo Simulator	February 12, 2010	Auran	Layernet	✗	✓
Real Warfare - 1242	June 10, 2010	Lesta Studio	1C Company	✗	✓
Reign: Conflict of Nations	June 24, 2010	Unicorn Games	1C Company	✗	✓
Road Works Simulator	May 18, 2010	UIG Entertainment	Auran	✗	✓
Skyscraper Simulator	May 19, 2010	UIG Entertainment	Auran	✗	✓
Snowcat Simulator	May 21, 2010	UIG Entertainment	Auran	✗	✓
Sol Survivor	Mar 15, 2010	Cadenza Interactive	Cadenza Interactive	✓	✗
Theatre of War 2 - Kursk 1943	June 10, 2010	1C Company	1C Company	✗	✓
Tow Truck Simulator	May 21, 2010	UIG Entertainment	Auran	✗	✓
Woodcutter Simulator	May 21, 2010	UIG Entertainment	Auran	✗	✓
