= Digital distribution of video games =

In the video game industry, digital distribution is the process of delivering video game content as digital information, without the exchange or purchase of new physical media such as ROM cartridges, magnetic storage, optical discs and flash memory cards. This process has existed since the early 1980s, but it was only with network advancements in bandwidth capabilities in the early 2000s that digital distribution became more prominent as a method of selling games. Currently, the process is dominated by online distribution over broadband Internet.

To facilitate the sale of games, various video game publishers and console manufacturers have created their own platforms for digital distribution. These platforms provide centralized services to purchase and download digital content for either specific video game consoles or personal computers. Some platforms may also serve as digital rights management systems, limiting the use of purchased items to one account.

Digital distribution of video games is becoming increasingly common, with major publishers and retailers paying more attention to digital sales, including Steam, PlayStation Store, Amazon.com, Epic Games Store, GameStop, Xbox Games Store, Nintendo eShop, and others. It is particularly popular for PC games. According to a study conducted by SuperData Research, the volume of digital distribution of video games worldwide was $6.2 billion per month in February 2016, and reached $7.7 billion per month in April 2017.

== History ==
=== 1980s ===
Before Internet connections became widespread, there were few services for digital distribution of games, and physical media was the dominant method of delivering video games. One of the first examples of digital distribution in video games was GameLine, which operated during the early 1980s. The service allowed Atari 2600 owners to use a specialized cartridge to connect through a phone line to a central server and rent a video game for 5–10 days. The GameLine service was terminated during the video game crash of 1983. From 1987 to 2003, Nintendo's Japan-only Disk Writer kiosks allowed users to copy from a jukebox style of rotating stock of the latest games to their floppy disks. They can keep each one for an unlimited time, and play at home on the Family Computer Disk System for ¥500, then about US$3.25 and 1/6 of the price of many new games. It was called "truly ground-breaking for its time and could be considered a forerunner of more modern distribution methods [such as] Xbox Live Arcade, PlayStation Network, and Steam". There were also examples such as Soft bender TAKERU for PCs, which also served as a distribution system for karaoke.

=== 1990s ===
Only a few digital distribution services for consoles would appear in the 90s. Among them were Sega's Sega Meganet and Sega Channel, released in 1990 and 1994 respectively, providing Sega Genesis owners with access to games on demand and other services. Nintendo released peripherals and services only in Japan: the Satellaview satellite subscription service for Super Famicom and the Nintendo Power flash cartridge in-store kiosk system for Super Famicom and Game Boy.

On PCs, digital distribution was more prevalent. In the late 1980s and early 1990s, prior to the widespread adoption of the Internet, it was common for software developers to upload demos and shareware to Bulletin Board Systems. In most cases, demos or shareware releases would contain an advertisement for the full game with ordering instructions for a physical copy of the full game or software. Some developers instead used a licensing system where 'full versions' could be unlocked from the downloaded software with the purchase of a key, thereby making this method the first true digital distribution method for PC Software. Notable examples include the Software Creations BBS and ExecPC BBS, both of which continue to exist today – albeit in a very different form. Bulletin Board systems however were not interconnected, and developers would have to upload their software to each site. Additionally, BBSs required users to place a telephone call with a modem to reach their system. For many users, this meant incurring long-distance charges. These factors contributed to a sharp decline in BBS usage in the early 1990s, coinciding with the rise of inexpensive Internet providers.

In the mid-1990s, with the rise of the Internet, early individual examples for digital distribution under usage of this new medium emerged, although there were no significant services for it. For instance, in 1997 the video game producer Cavedog regularly distributed additional content for the Real-time strategy computer game Total Annihilation as Internet downloads via their website.

Also, users used the Internet to distribute their own content. Without access to the retail infrastructure that would allow them to distribute this content through physical media, user-created content such as game modifications, maps or fan patches could only be distributed online.

=== 2000s ===
By this time, Internet connections were fast and numerous enough such that digital distribution of games and other related content became viable.

==== Consoles ====
The proliferation of Internet-enabled consoles allowed also additional buyable content that could be added onto full retail games, such as maps, in-game clothing, and gameplay. This type of content, called DLC (Downloadable content), become prevalent for consoles in the 2000s.

==== PC ====
An early innovator of the digital distribution idea on the PC was Stardock. In 2001 Stardock released the Stardock Central to digitally distribute and sell its own PC titles, followed by a service called Drengin.net with a yearly subscription pay model in summer 2003. In 2004, the subscription model was substituted by TotalGaming.net which allowed individual purchases or pay an upfront fee for tokens which allowed them to purchase games at a discount. In 2008, Stardock announced Impulse a third-generation digital distribution platform, which included independent third-party games and major publisher titles. The platform was sold to GameStop in May 2011.

The period between 2004 and now saw the rise of many digital distribution services on PC, such as Amazon Digital Services, Impulse, GameTap, GameStop, Games for Windows – Live, Origin, Battle.net, Direct2Drive, GOG.com, GamersGate and several more. The offered properties and policies differ significantly between the digital distribution services: e.g. while most of the digital distributors don't allow reselling of bought games, Green Man Gaming allows this.

In September 2003 Valve released the Steam platform for Windows computers (later expanded to Mac OS and Linux) as a means to distribute Valve-developed video games. Steam has the speciality that customers don't buy games but instead get the right to use games, which might be revoked when a violation of the End-user license agreement is seen by Valve or when a customer doesn't accept changes in the End-user license agreement. Steam began later to sell the right to play games from independent developers and major distributors and has since become the largest PC digital distributor. By 2011, Steam has approximately 50–70% of the market for downloadable PC games, with a userbase of about 40 million accounts.

In 2008, the website gog.com (formerly called Good Old Games) was started, specialized in the distribution of older, classic PC games. While all the other DD services allow various forms of DRM (or even have them embedded) gog.com has a strict non-DRM policy. Desura was launched in 2010. The service was notable for having a strong support of the modding community and also has an open source client, called Desurium. Origin, a new version of the Electronic Arts online store, was released in 2011 in order to compete with Steam and other digital distribution platforms on the PC.

=== 2010s ===
==== Mobile gaming ====
Digital distribution is the dominant method of delivering content on mobile platforms such as iOS devices and Android phones. Lower barriers to entry has allowed more developers to create and distribute games on these platforms, with the mobile gaming industry growing considerably as a result.

==== Console gaming ====
Today, each of the current main consoles (Nintendo Switch, Xbox Series X/S, and PlayStation 5) has its own digital distribution platform to sell games exclusive to digital formats and digital versions of retail games. These are the Nintendo eShop, Xbox Games Store, and PlayStation Store, respectively, which all sell full retail games, along with other products, such as DLC.

=== 2020s ===
==== Console gaming ====
In 2025, Nintendo introduced a software update for the Nintendo Switch that enabled limited-time sharing of digital games and applications purchased through the Nintendo eShop. In the same year, with the release of the Switch 2, Nintendo also introduced a new format of the Nintendo Game Card, known as the Game-Key Card. This format functions as a digital license, granting users the ability to download the associated game from the eShop. The card also serves as a form of ownership validation, enabling the resale of used copies. Major game publisher Capcom has reportedly classified sales of Game-Key Cards as "digital sales".

Publishers began moving fully away from physical distribution to wholly digital in the latter half of the 2020s. Rockstar Games stated they had no plans to release disc versions of Grand Theft Auto VI at release in November 2026; physical units of the game will include a redeemable download code but no disc. Sony announced that it will cease producing physical versions of its PlayStation 5 games by January 2028.

== Implications ==
The main advantages of digital distribution over the previously dominant retail distribution of video games include significantly reduced production, deployment, and storage costs. Games purchased digitally are legally licenses and not sold, meaning consumers do not have legal ownership and cannot resell their games.

Compared to physically distributed games, digital games cannot be destroyed because they can be redownloaded from the distribution system. Services like Steam, Origin, and Xbox Live do not offer ways to sell used games once they are no longer desired. Steam offers non-commercial family sharing options. This is also somewhat countered by frequent sales offered by these digital distributors, often allowing major savings by selling at prices below what a retailer is able to offer.

Digital distribution also offers new structural possibilities for the whole video game industry, which, prior to the emergence of digital media as a relevant means of distribution, was usually built around the relationship of the video game developer, who produced the game, and the video game publisher, who financed and organized the distribution and sale. The heightened production costs in the early 2000s made many video game publishers avoid risks and led to the rejection of many smaller-scale game development projects. Gabe Newell, co-founder of Valve, the developer and intellectual property rights owner of Steam, described the disadvantages of physical retail distribution for smaller game developers as such:

The worst days [for game development] were the cartridge days for the NES. It was a huge risk – you had all this money tied up in silicon in a warehouse somewhere, and so you'd be conservative in the decisions you felt you could make, very conservative in the IPs you signed, your art direction would not change, and so on. Now it's the opposite extreme: we can put something up on Steam, deliver it to people all around the world, make changes. We can take more interesting risks.[...] Retail doesn't know how to deal with those games. On Steam [a digital distributor] there's no shelf-space restriction.

— Gabe Newell, Rock, Paper, Shotgun

Since the 2000s, when digital distribution saw its first meaningful surge in popularity, an increasing number of niche market titles have been made available and become commercially successful, including (but not limited to) remakes of classic games. The new possibilities of digital distribution stimulated the creation of game titles from small video game producers like independent game developers and modders (e.g. Garry's Mod), which before were not commercially feasible.

=== Indie game development ===
The increasing prevalence of digital distribution has allowed independent game developers to sell and distribute their games without having to negotiate deals with publishers. No longer required to rely on conventional physical retail sales, independent developers have seen success through the sale of games that normally would not be accepted by publishers for distribution. The PC and mobile platforms are the most prominent in regards to independent game distribution, with services such as GOG.com, GamersGate, Steam and the iOS App Store providing ways to sell games with minimal to no distribution costs. Some digital distribution platforms exist specifically for indie game distribution, such as the Xbox Live Indie Games.

== Business model ==
Nearly all digital distribution services today take a cut of the revenue of each sale to cover costs for running the storefront, the distribution of content, and other facets. According to a 2019 study by IGN based on published data and interviews with publishers and developers, this is nearly 30% for the personal computer storefronts, including Steam, GOG.com and Microsoft, for console services for Nintendo Switch, PlayStation 4, and Xbox One, for mobile app stores including App Store and Google Play. Some exceptions to this are itch.io where the developer is free to set the rate, Humble Bundle which takes a 15% cut in addition to an additional 10% that the buyer can select to go to charity or to the developer, and the Epic Games Store (EGS) which has a 12% cut. This 30% cut is consistent with past licensing for development on video game consoles since the Nintendo Entertainment System.

Surveys from 2019 to 2021 found developers and publishers desired to see a reduction of industry-standard 30% take, since this would increase the amount of revenue they would see from each sale. Epic Games' Tim Sweeney, prior to launching the Epic Games Store, had estimated that the current costs for delivering game content to buyers required as low as an 8% cut on sales revenue, and launched the EGS with its 12% cut to demonstrate this. Microsoft announced it would similarly reduce the Microsoft Store cut for Windows products from 30% to 12% by August 1, 2021.

== List of video game digital distribution systems ==
=== Console ===
- Microsoft Store
- Nintendo eShop
- PlayStation Store

=== Mobile ===
- Amazon Appstore
- Apple App Store
- Google Play Store
- Huawei AppGallery
- Itch.io
- Samsung Galaxy Store
- TapTap
- Tencent AppStore

=== PC – Websites ===
- Big Fish Games
- Direct2Drive
- DotEmu
- GameHouse
- Game Jolt
- GamersGate
- Green Man Gaming
- Metaboli
- Newgrounds
- Steam

==== DRM-free ====
- GOG.com
- Humble Store
- Itch.io
- Zoom Platform

=== PC – Clients ===
| Client | Publisher | Open to third-party operators | Total titles |
|---|---|---|---|
| Amazon Games | (United States) Amazon.com, Inc. | ? | = 40 |
| Battle.net | (United States) Activision-Blizzard, Inc. | No | = 20 |
| EA App (Formerly Origin) | (United States) Electronic Arts, Inc. | No | > 380 |
| Epic Games Store | (United States) Epic Games, Inc. | Yes | > 4,000 |
| GOG Galaxy | (Poland) CD Projekt S.A. | Yes | > 7,000 |
| Microsoft Store | (United States) Microsoft Corporation | Yes | < 240 |
| Riot Client | (United States) Riot Games, Inc. | No | = 5 |
| Rockstar Games Launcher | (United States) Rockstar Games, Inc. | No | > 5 |
| Steam | (United States) Valve Corporation | Yes | > 100,000 |
| Ubisoft Connect | (France) Ubisoft Entertainment SA | No | < 240 |
| WeGame | (China) Tencent | Yes | > 10,000 |

=== Obsolete ===
- Awomo
- Beamdog Client (December 8, 2025)
- Bethesda.net Launcher (May 11, 2022)
- Desura (September 26, 2017)
- Discord (March 10, 2022)
- Family Computer Network System (1991)
- GameLine (early 1980s)
- Games for Windows – Live (August 22, 2013)
- GameStop PC Downloads (formerly known as Impulse) (April 24, 2014)
- GameTap (October 2015)
- IndieVania
- iQue Depot (2016)
- LittleIndie
- Nintendo 64DD Randnet (February 28, 2001)
- Nintendo DSi Shop (March 31, 2017)
- Nintendo Power (February 28, 2007)
- Playism (2021)
- Satellaview (June 30, 2000)
- Sega Channel (July 31, 1998)
- Wii Shop Channel (January 30, 2019)
- Xbox Games Store (October 2019)

== See also ==
- Cloud gaming
- Downloadable content
