= GamersGate =

Online video game store

GamersGate AB
- Type: Private
- Industry: Video games, electronic commerce, digital distribution
- Genre: Content delivery Retail; Digital distribution
- Founded: 2006; 20 years ago
- Headquarters: Stockholm, Sweden
- Key people: Theodore Bergquist, Daniel Hjelmtorp, Gustav Nisser
- Number of employees: 25
- Website: gamersgate.com

GamersGate AB (formerly Gamer's Gate) is a Sweden-based online video game store offering electronic strategy guides and games for Windows, macOS, and Linux via direct download. It is a competitor to online video game services such as Steam, GOG.com, and Direct2Drive.

GamersGate sells games for over 250 publishers and developers, including Electronic Arts, Atari, Bethesda Softworks, 2K Games, Ubisoft, SEGA, Capcom, Paradox Interactive and Epic Games as well as smaller independent developers such as 2D Boy, Jonathan Blow and Amanita Design. As of September 2014, there are over 6000 games available through GamersGate.

== History ==
The idea of GamersGate was conceived by Paradox Interactive in 2004 after numerous fan requests for better access to Paradox's games were finally answered in the form of direct downloads. After Paradox sold a game to an Argentine fan via a download link that was later removed, word spread on the Paradox forums and international fans began asking if they too could purchase video games through downloads. Seeking to provide cheap distribution of games to countries that did not offer them in physical retail stores, Paradox developed a digital distribution system called "Paradox on Demand" and commenced trial operations in April 2006. On 20 November 2006, the system was officially launched under the name "Gamer's Gate". Interest in the service grew such that in 2008, after other publishers requested that Gamer's Gate distribute their games as well, Paradox decided to separate the service into an independent company called "GamersGate". By April 2009, GamersGate was offering 1000 video game titles. By April of the following year, they had doubled their offering to 2000 titles. An additional 1000 games were added in 2011, bringing the company's total to 3000 games. This pattern has repeated each year with 4000 games offered in 2012, 5000 offered in 2013, and over 6000 as of 2014.

== Features ==
As a digital distribution company, GamersGate offers digital rights management-free (DRM-free) games and downloadable content (DLC) for PC, Mac, Linux, and Android platforms. GamersGate is a client-free service that does not require users to log on in order to play purchased games. In a January 2012 article for The Escapist magazine, columnist Shamus Young speculated that these features would appeal to gamers opposed to the passive DRM validation, always-on DRM, and mandatory client program downloads that were common to many of GamersGate's top competitors. GamersGate accepts online payment by credit card or cash via Rixty. From 2012-2013, it offered a catalog of free games via its Void system.

GamersGate is one of the earliest digital distribution sites and has undergone major aesthetic redesigns over the years. The first major redesign occurred in May 2009 when they adopted a design that Rock, Paper, Shotgun's Alec Meer described as "GoG-esque" and "shiny". The second redesign occurred in July 2011 and was interpreted by some as a response to changes in the industry including the launch of Origin and the acquisitions of Direct2Drive by GameFly and Impulse by GameStop.

=== Downloadable content and developer tools ===
GamersGate was one of the earliest video game stores to offer downloadable content for PC games, starting with downloadable content for the Hearts of Iron and Europa Universalis series.

In December 2008, GamersGate began offering developers MicroSuite, a free in-game downloadable-content API that allows game companies to insert DLC microtransactions into gameplay. The release of MicroSuite came only a few months after GamersGate's release of the GameNerve Publishing Suite, a management tool allowing users to publish and digitally distribute newly created games in order to maximize profits for the creator rather than an intermediate distribution company.

=== Client-free ===
GamersGate initially required a software client for its customers to download their purchased games, but on 28 January 2009, the company began allowing customers to download games through a micro-download. Under this system, every game is associated with a small corresponding program that, when downloaded, will retrieve the install files for the customer's computer. Upon retrieval, the user installs the game and may then remove the downloader from the computer. CEO Theo Bergquist has touted the client-less feature of GamersGate as a way to distinguish it from more dominant video game distribution platforms like Valve's Steam.

=== DRM-free ===
Since its inception, GamersGate has eschewed the use of controversial digital rights management (DRM) schemes common to other digital video game distribution services. Games downloaded from GamersGate are released free of passive DRM validation and always-on DRM, and GamersGate users have the option of transferring purchased games to other accounts. Company CEO Theo Bergquist has emphasized the need for digital distribution companies to trust consumers. Although the potential for video game piracy and similar abuses are present through its method, GamersGate believes that trust in consumers acts as "a source of comfort" for its customers. The company has sought to work against piracy by cultivating mutual respect between itself and its strong player community. In an article for Information & Communications Technology Law, Peter Holm suggests that perhaps GamersGate's best DRM-free defense against piracy is simply that it makes the legal purchase of games easy and cheap.

In addition to GamersGate's customer-friendly policies, rulings by the Court of Justice of the European Union on the topic of digital right of first sale have clarified that lessors who indefinitely license software thereby exhaust their property rights to the software. The effect of this ruling is that European digital distribution customers may resell downloaded games on the secondary market. Because GamersGate is based in Sweden and serves French, German, Italian, Polish, Spanish, and Swedish customers, this ruling has significance for GamersGate's European sales.

== Games ==
GamersGate has partnered with over 250 publishers and developers including 2K Games, Atari, Capcom, Electronic Arts, Epic Games, Koei, SEGA, THQ, Ubisoft, and Vivendi Games among many others. GamersGate has also signed distribution agreements with numerous smaller independent video game developers and a wide variety of international developers like the Russian 1C Company, the British Blitz Games, the German Crimson Cow and Kalypso Media, and the French Microïds.

Initially distributing only PC games, GamersGate began offering Mac games in June 2009 and later added Linux games and Android games. As of June 2014, the site lists over 1500 Mac titles. As GamersGate has expanded its catalog to include macOS (formerly Mac OS X) and indie games, it has been acknowledged as a good place to download Mac games and for new game developers to get published and to make early sales.

Because it was formed as a split from a strategy game developer, the majority of the company's initial offerings were strategy war games. However, as third-party developers signed on to distribute with Gamersgate, the site's offerings became increasingly eclectic. Rock, Paper, Shotgun's Kieron Gillen noted in 2008 that GamersGate's Top 10 Sales chart provided "a snapshot of a completely alien PC gaming world" with obscure but meritorious titles outperforming mainstream titles. Gillen suggested that this was evidence that "downloadable games enable niches." This pattern has lessened through the years but has never entirely disappeared. New Tang Dynasty Television drew attention to GamersGate's charts in 2014, when the free-to-play co-op game Warframe ranked alongside Castle of Illusion.

GamersGate frequently offers special deals and sales on its inventory. It has been praised by critics for its innovative bundling that, during some sales, allows purchasers to opt out of individual games enclosed within the bundle for a reduction in the bundle's price.

=== FreeGames and Void ===
At E3 2011, GamersGate announced that it would be offering free video games in exchange for advertisement views. Players could download a game for free but, prior to playing it, would have to watch a short advertisement selected by GamersGate's advertising partner, Blind Ferret Media. Advertisements would not be inserted during gameplay. The new program, called "FreeGames", was set for beta release in mid-June 2011. Interest among gamers was so high that 10 thousand beta signups were made within the first few hours. The official start of the program was intended to be 1 September 2011 and to offer some 200 games. GamersGate CEO Theo Bergquist stated that the company's long-term goal was to offer as many of its 3000 games as possible under the FreeGames program. Bergquist's claims that this was the first program of its kind were refuted by Shacknews' Alice O'Conner, who pointed to a similar failed experiment by Ubisoft in 2007. However, in the following weeks GamersGate's beta run proved to be a success.

GamersGate officially launched the follow-up program to FreeGames, christened "Void", on 28 May 2012. Like FreeGames, the service allowed customers with an account to download certain games for free in exchange for watching a few short advertisements. At release, nearly 100 games were available in the Void catalogue. The company ended the Void service in January 2013.

== Market share ==
As one of the earliest digital distribution services, GamersGate saw rapid expansion in its earlier years with over 100 percent in growth from launch through 2009. Contemporaneously, GamersGate's parent company, Paradox Interactive, saw digital distribution overtake retail sales. In January 2011, it reported that GamersGate digital downloads accounted for 70 percent of Paradox's total revenue, which had grown over 1000 percent since 2001. By July of the same year, Paradox reported that 90 percent of its sales were digital (through both Steam and GamersGate).

The total market share of digital downloads going to GamersGate, however, is considerably smaller than its major competitor, Steam. It has also faced competition from newer companies like GOG.com and from contemporaries like Impulse and Direct2Drive. Analysis by Impulse owner Stardock in December 2009 indicated that Steam controlled at least 70 percent of the market with the other big players (Direct2Drive, GamersGate, and Impulse) competing over the remaining 30 percent. Stardock's claim that Impulse controlled 10 percent of the market was vocally disputed by both Direct2Drive and GamersGate, with GamersGate's Theo Bergquist arguing that "in many, many cases we know that GamersGate sell as many units as Steam for the mid-size segment of titles." Luke Plunkett, writing for Kotaku, noted that "none of this bickering involves serious competing with Steam, leading us to believe that the PC scene's pecking order is Steam first, daylight second, and these guys jostling over the last spot on the podium." A July 2010 study conducted by NPD Group failed to list GamersGate among the top 5 digital distribution companies. However, this study was disputed by both GamersGate and Impulse (which also failed to rank).

=== Localization and expansion ===
Launched on the World Wide Web from Stockholm, Sweden in 2006, GamersGate has expanded internationally both online and offline. One of its first expansions took place in September 2010 when it opened an online branch within Facebook. Starting with the Swedish site, se.gamersgate.com, Gamersgate launched localized websites throughout Europe in late 2010 and early 2011. Specific versions of GamersGate were made for French, German, Italian, Polish, and Spanish language customers. The following year, GamersGate announced that, due to a 50 percent growth in sales from the previous year and in anticipation of its upcoming Void advertising program, it would be opening a physical shop and office in New York in 2012.

=== Competition with other distributors ===
GamersGate has been in active competition with digital distributors including Steam, Impulse, Direct2Drive, and to a lesser extent OnLive, and Origin. Notably, GamersGate has gained a reputation for sharp criticism of Steam which in 2011 Theo Bergquist suggested was "peaking". Although market statistics convincingly show Steam to be the most dominant player in the digital distribution market, Bergquist argues that this is strictly due to the fact that the market is currently oriented toward the hardcore gamer subculture. Bergquist predicts that Steam will lose market share as the market widens in the future and that GamersGate, with its considerably less cumbersome client-free and DRM-free system, is well positioned to grow rapidly. Disagreement over Steam's embracing of DRM technologies has led GamersGate and others to boycott the distribution of popular titles like Call of Duty: Modern Warfare 2 that contain software such as IWNET, a player matchmaking service that works through Steam and therefore requires a Steam client and account. Describing games containing such software as Trojan horses, GamersGate and other digital distributors have refused to carry certain games that mandate the installation of client software.

GamersGate's criticism of Impulse has also received extensive coverage in the gaming press. As early as 2009, GamersGate criticized Impulse owner Stardock's analysis of its share of the digital download market as misleadingly self-aggrandizing. A series of back and forth comments between the companies prompted Kotaku's Luke Plunkett to describe GamersGate, Impulse, and Direct2Drive as "guys jostling over the last spot on the podium". Criticism was again levied by GamersGate against Impulse in April 2011 in response to GameStop's acquisition of Impulse from Stardock. GamersGate's Theo Bergquist questioned the wisdom of the purchase, describing Impulse as Steam's "lesser talented stepchild" and summarizing GameStop's press release as "we will do whatever we can to not be the next Blockbuster". GamersGate specifically pointed to shortcomings in Impulse's technological capacities, describing the service as "outdated" and archaic. In response, Stardock CEO Bradley Wardell suggested that the comments from GamersGate were more likely revelatory of GamersGate's financial situation and that perhaps the company wasn't operating as profitably as it claimed.
