= DirectSkin =

DirectSkin in action

DirectSkin is a software component that is used by software developers to add skinning capability to their applications, which may or may not be exposed to end-users. It is made by Stardock, and is derived from the WindowBlinds component of their software subscription package, Object Desktop. Being implemented as an ActiveX/COM component, it may be used by any COM-capable language, including Visual Basic, VB.NET, C#, C++ and Delphi.

DirectSkin uses the WindowBlinds UIS file format, leveraging skin authors' existing knowledge. Users either contract Stardock or third party companies to create their skins, license existing skins for use with an application, or make their own using SkinStudio.

DirectSkin has seen use in various applications; the most public has been that of the ATI CATALYST Control Center, a graphical user interface for their graphics card device drivers running on the .NET Framework, introduced in 2004. Another example is Syncfusion, a toolkit for creating .NET applications.
