= Kael =

Kael is an Irish name derived from the Gaelic word caol, meaning slender, and is also related to the Irish name Kellen, which means mighty warrior. It may also refer to:

- Chris Kael, bass guitarist of the American heavy metal band Five Finger Death Punch
- Pauline Kael, American author and movie critic
- Derek Paxton, known as "Kael", video game designer and project leader for the Fall from Heaven series of game mods based on the game Civilization 4.

== See also ==
- Kail (disambiguation)
- Kale (disambiguation)
