= Object Desktop =

Software suite for Windows

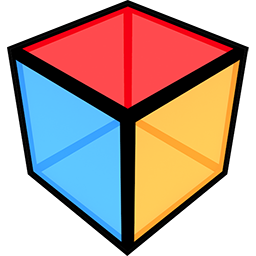
- Developer: Stardock
- Stable release: 4.3.7830.30748 / June 10, 2021; 5 years ago
- Operating system: Microsoft Windows
- Type: OS Customization
- License: Proprietary
- Website: www.stardock.com/products/odnt/

Object Desktop (OD; previously the Object Desktop Network or ODNT) is an online software subscription service created by Stardock for OS/2 and relaunched for Windows in 1997.

Object Desktop includes most graphical user interface customization and productivity products offered by Stardock, including WindowBlinds, Fences, DesktopX, Tweak7, IconPackager and ObjectBar.

== History ==
=== OS/2 (1993 to 2001) ===
Object Desktop — initially entitled The Workplace Toolset/2 — was developed over three years by Brad Wardell and Kurt Westerfeld subsequent to Stardock's OS/2 Essentials, a pre-registered set of OS/2 shareware. Object Desktop 1.0 was followed by 1.5 and Professional versions following in short order.

By 1997 the OS/2 ISV market was flagging, and many customers were switching to Windows NT 4. 1997 OS/2 revenues were 33% of those in 1996, and they fell to 25% of 1996 levels in 1998. This led to their decision to switch to Windows in mid-1997. Nevertheless, Stardock remained an OS/2 ISV until February 2001, when they stopped selling Object Desktop for OS/2.

OS/2 versions were sold as initial versions and upgrades, costing more than later Windows versions due to lower volume of sales.

==== Object Desktop 1.0 ====
The initial release of Object Desktop was both praised for its functionality and criticised for performance and compatibility issues.

==== Object Desktop 1.5 ====
Object Desktop 1.5 was released on 2 May 1996, fixing many problems, and adding the following components:

- Enhanced Folder
- HyperCache
- HyperDrive
- Object Package
- Stardock Internet Shell
- Object Archive

Users of 1.0 could upgrade for $37.

==== Object Desktop Professional ====
Object Desktop Professional was (as the name suggests) aimed at professional users of OS/2. It was released on 24 August 1996, priced at $179; users could also upgrade from OD 1.5 for $69.95, or from OD 1.0 for $119.

The Object Desktop 2.0 logo incorporates a woodgrain motif, echoed in many skins

In addition to the features of OD 1.5, the package included:

- Desktop Backup Advisor
- Object Advisor
- Object Backup
- Object Inspector
- Object Package
- Object Scheduler
- Object Security
- Object Viewing

==== Object Desktop 2.0 ====
Object Desktop 2.0 was an update to all previously released components, and an integration of the Professional features into the main package. It was priced at $99.95; users of Object Desktop Professional could upgrade for $39, while other versions could be upgraded for $69.95.

An upgrade to 2.02 was released at the start of 2000, but it was made clear that it would be the last release.

=== Windows (1997 onwards) ===
==== Early Experience Program ====
When it became clear that OS/2 would not remain a viable platform, Stardock decided to move to Windows. This required rewriting old components and writing new ones to replace those which were not appropriate for Windows. This would take time, but Stardock needed money immediately to sustain development.

To cope with this cashflow problem, Object Desktop users who had switched from OS/2 to Windows were asked to purchase Windows subscriptions in advance of the actual software, on the understanding that their subscription period would only begin when the software was reasonably complete (which ended up as December 1999). This program was called the Early Experience Program. Due to significant goodwill built up over the previous years, many signed up, and Stardock survived.

==== Changes in focus ====
Initially the new Object Desktop package was closely related to the OS/2 versions, with old favourites like Object Edit, Control Center and Task/Tab Launchpad being ported over. However, as the userbase expanded from its traditional core of technical users into the wider Windows market, newer components shifted to focus on customizing the graphical user interface. The flagship component of Object Desktop became WindowBlinds; other popular additions were IconPackager, ObjectBar, DesktopX, DeskScapes and Fences.

== Operation and pricing ==
Impulse (preceded by Component Manager and Stardock Central) is the main interface for registering, downloading and updating components. It is roughly equivalent to a package manager.

Users pay an initial fee for access to the software and one year of access to download updates. They may also download new components added during their subscription period. Updates are not guaranteed; components deemed less relevant may be passed over, or removed.

After expiry, users cannot download any software until they renew; however, they do not lose the use of released (non-beta) software that is already downloaded, nor is it necessary to renew immediately. Renewals add a year of access from the date of renewal, not the expiry date.

Historically, the initial subscription fee for the Windows version of Object Desktop has been $49.95, while a year's renewal or an upgrade from a standalone component has been $34.95. Object Desktop 2008 introduced two tiers, with the lower tier at $49.95 and the higher tier at $69.95, but the latter was eliminated in 2010.

== Components ==
Object Desktop works on a component model; many of its programs are available separately, but subscribers can use all of them.

=== Current components ===
These components are available to all Object Desktop subscribers as of February 2010:

Name	Description
WindowBlinds	Changes visual styles for window borders, controls, the taskbar, Start Menu and other areas. The first versions of WindowBlinds were released in 1998 for Windows 95. It has since developed to become Object Desktop's most popular component. WindowBlinds technology is the basis for DirectSkin, Stardock's corporate ActiveX/COM skinning component.
Fences	Desktop icon visibility and organization tool, allowing related programs to be split into groups (fences) and shown or hidden at need. Fences Pro, included with Object Desktop, adds sorting and automatically inserts new items into fences based on file name or type.
DeskScapes	Animated wallpapers for Windows XP and up. Includes dynamic, configurable wallpapers which can — for example — change sky color with the time. Initially an extension of Windows Vista Ultimate's DreamScene.
IconPackager	Icon customization is popular An icon package manager. Users can create and apply icon packages that replace the Windows icons, file type icons and folder icons. The shareware version includes basic icon changing and the Icon Explorer, an icon viewing applet. Registered versions add shell integration and the ability to change the icons that represent file formats in Windows Explorer. Icons may be adjusted separately, or by the loading of icon packages, which may themselves be part of a larger theme managed by Theme Manager. Several artists sell premium icon packages on WinCustomize and elsewhere, but the majority are free to use. IconPackager was the subject of controversy when competitors TGTSoft filed a lawsuit against Stardock over the rights to its file format.
ObjectBar	A highly customizable shell add-on, oriented around "bars". Has been most popular with users of Windows who wish to have the Macintosh menu bar, for which it provides an effective emulation. ObjectBar also integrated the functionality of Stardock's ControlCenter, but has been largely superseded by WindowBlinds and ObjectDock on Windows Vista and later.
RightClick	An expanded context menu for the desktop, offering DesktopX-compatible plugin support for menu items. Many features work in a similar way to ObjectBar, from which it is derived.
Tweak7 (TweakVista)	Helps users to optimize the performance and behavior of Windows Vista/7 in several areas. Supersedes TweakShell.
IconDeveloper	Creates icons from existing pictures, as opposed to software designed to create them one pixel at a time. Also provides for recolouring icons or icon packages.
LogonStudio	A free program that allows users to change their Windows XP, Vista or 7 logon screens using a variety of built-in or user-created images.
SoundPackager	A sound pack manager for Windows. Allows users to replace the entire set of sound effects.
Theme Manager (WinStyles)	Creates and applies theme suites, changing the skins of applications which support them. Integrates with several other components. Also available as MyColors, used largely for co-branded themes and corporate installs.
Keyboard LaunchPad	Creates keyboard shortcuts that can be used to launch applications, control media players, or insert clipboard snippets. Can be expanded through the use of plugins.
SkinStudio (BuilderBlinds)	Creates skins for WindowBlinds. SkinStudio Pro offers a code editor and eases the creation of animations and substyles. Previous versions supported ObjectBar, WebBlinds, PocketBlinds, Koala Player and Windows Media Player.
WindowFX	A program that adds shadows to windows, and provides window transitions for Windows XP. Transition effects use the same 3D APIs as mainstream computer games; as a result, they could be very demanding, particularly on computers built before Windows Vista. Transitions are created using a proprietary scripting programming language - a free third-party tool called WFXScripter can manipulate these scripts.

=== Obsolete components ===
These components may remain available for some legacy subscribers, but are not offered to new users:

Name	Description
Component Tray	A satellite applet of Stardock Central that sat in the system tray and checked occasionally for component updates. Replaced by an equivalent tool for Impulse.
DesktopX	A widget engine for Windows 2000 and above which can create individual objects or entire desktops. First released in 2000, it is available in three versions, one of which is able to create independent executables.
ControlCenter	Provided virtual desktops, folder shortcuts and statistical displays. Its importance diminished as DesktopX allows the creation of equivalent objects with more sophisticated graphics and custom functionality.
DriveScan	Visualized the file contents of drives in pie chart, bar chart or list format. Also showed a folder-by-folder breakdown of used space.
Enhanced Dialog	Enhanced common dialog boxes, allowing users to customize the places displayed at the side and to add "quick launch" buttons to the area above the folder view. Reached version 1.0 in July 2006.
IconX	Provided antialiased resizing, transparency, and mouseover effects/animation for desktop icons. Initially part of DesktopX, IconX was split out into a separate product in August 2004.
Object Edit	A syntax highlighting text editor.
ObjectMedia	A media player component based on DirectMedia. Could be run standalone, but was most often used with the DXPlayer plugin for DesktopX.
Object Sweeper	Cleared out temporary files and web caches, and removed empty folders from the Start Menu.
ObjectZip (Object Archives)	Provided basic ZIP, RAR and CAB support, including explorer shell integration. Deemed obsolete since newer versions of Windows provided a folder view for ZIP and CAB archives.
SpringFolders	Eased reorganization by opening folders when other folders were dragged onto them, in Explorer windows or on the desktop, and then closing them after the drag operation is complete.
Stardock Virtual Desktops	Integrated into the taskbar, adding virtual desktop capabilities. Replaced the component known as BandVWM.
Tab LaunchPad	A once-popular replacement for the OS/2 LaunchPad, adding tabs to store more shortcuts. Eclipsed by other components, notably ObjectDock, which added a tabs feature to its Plus version.
TweakShell	Modified elements of the shell. Windows PowerToys now provide a more complete solution.

=== Retired Windows components ===
StyleVista adjusting window borders

These components have been withdrawn from service or did not make it past the beta stages:

Name	Description
StyleVista	Changed Windows Vista's window styles. A beta version was released on 16 August 2005, permitting adjustment of the colour and opacity of Vista's translucent window borders. Microsoft incorporated this feature into Vista.
Association Wizard	Managed file associations. Superseded by improved support in Windows 2000, it was withdrawn in 2004.
SmartIP	Let users create dynamic DNS entries of the form username.stardock.net with a system tray applet. Withdrawn in 2002, the service remained running for existing users until the end of 2003.
TreeView	Added a "Tree" option to the list of View options in Windows Explorer folders, similar to that offered by macOS. While still available in beta, CEO Brad Wardell indicated that he did not consider it a viable component.
WebBlinds	An early demonstration of DirectSkin, Stardock's ActiveX/COM version of WindowBlinds. Allowed users to use WindowBlinds skins with Internet Explorer, plus change the toolbar icons. The icon functionality was merged with WindowBlinds.

=== Retired OS/2 Components ===
These components were not brought forth to the Windows version of Object Desktop:

Name	Description
Desktop Backup Advisor	Provided packaged desktops (useful for corporations wishing to roll out a standard desktop layout to users) and improved performance by repairing OS/2 INI files, which tended to fill with invalid entries over time.
Object Navigator	An advanced file manager for OS/2. Displayed long filenames on FAT partitions, and the professional version offered a view pane that displayed most types of file.
Object Netscan	Displayed a bandwidth usage graph and other statistics relating to network usage.
Object Inspector	Allowed users to inspect and modify OS/2 Workplace Shell objects.
Object Package	Used to back up the desktop and other shell objects.
Object Schedule	A folder-based task scheduler.
Object Security	Provided basic desktop-level security.
Object Viewing	The equivalent of Quick View for Windows 95, this allowed the display of numerous file formats in applications, as well as in Object Navigator.

== Criticism ==
An occasional complaint with the subscription model is that a subscriber's favourite component has not been updated recently, or may be left in beta for a long time. On the other hand, popular components such as WindowBlinds tend to be frequently updated, with beta releases every week or two, release versions with new features every few months, and major version changes every year or so.

Some non-Object Desktop users have said the beta issue creates a double standard and forces people to upgrade to Object Desktop in order to get the latest features, while Stardock says that the policy is due to too many standalone users expecting beta versions to have the same reliability as release versions, and the increased ease of releasing a build on Impulse over a separate installation package.
