= Tweak7 =

Tweak7/TweakVista
- Developer(s): Stardock
- Stable release: 2.0 / October 27, 2008; 16 years ago
- Operating system: Windows Vista/Windows 7
- Platform: Microsoft Windows
- Available in: English
- License: Proprietary
- Website: www.tweakvista.net

Tweak7 (previously TweakVista) is a software tool for Windows Vista and Windows 7 that allows modification of various OS-specific functions, most notably the settings surrounding the Desktop Window Manager, User Account Control and startup programs. A beta version became available in July 2005, with a complete overhaul in June 2007. A Windows 7 version was released in October 2009.

The program offers changes on two levels - a first level for non-technical users with descriptions in "plain language", and a second level for power users. It was recommended by Personal Computer World as "a very useful tool that doesn’t require advanced knowledge." ExtremeTech called it "the mother of all control panels", praising its "ability to dig up useful and obscure information", but criticising "a lack of help for problems uncovered".

Tweak7 was developed by Stardock and distributed as part of their Object Desktop suite. It was co-distributed by Advanced PC Media (Steve Sinchak), which held a trademark on the term TweakVista.
