= Holiline Reminder =

Free software calendar for Windows

- Developer(s): Holiline
- Stable release: 3.0.1 / October 27, 2014; 10 years ago
- Operating system: Windows
- Type: Calendar software
- License: Freeware
- Website: holiline.com

Holiline Reminder is a free software calendar program for Windows.

Holiline Reminder is characterized by very small space and memory requirements, stability, and an easily customizable user-interface. Holiline Reminder places birthday countdowns, special holidays, and upcoming weddings in a creeping line banner that will stay at the top or bottom of a desktop. It has common functions such as a to-do list and a calendar and unique functions such as a creeping line and adjusting colors to a desktop.

Different event types have a different set of displayed field and a different text of a notification. Each event type can be supplemented with a photo which is displayed in a tooltip. Calendars can also be imported using widespread iCal files.

Holiline Reminder is available as of 2012 in 16 languages.

Alternatives to Holiline Reminder include Google Calendar, Rainlendar and DeskTask.
