= Derek Paxton =

Video game designer

Derek Paxton, sometimes known as "Kael", is a professional game designer and producer with Amplitude Studios, having previously been successful with his mod Fall from Heaven for Civilization 4. Derek is the game director for the upcoming game release of Endless Legend 2.

== Fall from Heaven ==
Paxton was the lead designer of the popular mods Fall from Heaven and Fall from Heaven II for Civilization 4, with the latter becoming the most successful of its kind, amassing over 500,000 downloads. The original was released in December 2005, and, over the next five years, the mod expanded and attracted a large fanbase. As of June 2011, over a quarter of a million posts have been made in its dedicated forum on CivFanatics. In 2010, the final version of Fall from Heaven 2 was released.

Paxton announced in 2010 that he was leading a new version of Fall from Heaven as a stand-alone game, but later that year he revealed that funding for this project had fallen through, and it was abandoned, although he has expressed an interest in coming back to it at a later date.

== Stardock and Elemental ==
In 2010, following Stardock's unsuccessful launch of Elemental: War of Magic, Paxton was approached by Stardock's Brad Wardell, and in October that year, it was announced that he would be joining the development team for Elemental: War of Magic. In October 2012 the game Elemental: Fallen Enchantress was released, crediting Derek Paxton as lead designer.
