= Yahoo Smart TV =

Yahoo! Smart TV
- Developer: Yahoo!
- Manufacturer: Yahoo!, Samsung, Sony, Mediatek, Vizio, Toshiba
- Type: Digital media receiver
- Released: March 30, 2009
- Discontinued: September 30, 2025
- Operating system: Linux
- Online services: Flickr, Twitter, Amazon Video, Blockbuster, YouTube, Netflix, etc.
- Website: smarttv.yahoo.com

Yahoo! Smart TV (formerly Yahoo! Connected TV) was a Smart TV platform developed by Yahoo! based upon the Yahoo! Desktop Widgets (Konfabulator) platform. Yahoo! Connected TV announced on August 20, 2008, at the Intel Developer Forum in San Francisco as the Widget Channel, it integrated the Yahoo! Widgets Engine with a new television oriented user interface to enable Internet connected applications to run and display on a 10-foot user interface. The platform was quickly dropped by most of its manufacturers after model year 2012. New apps that were based on Konfabulator stopped being added effective March 30, 2018, but existing apps could still be updated and installed, and HTML5 based apps were not affected by this. Yahoo! Smart TV finally shut down on September 30, 2025, and all apps running on it stopped functioning after that date.

== Development ==
Yahoo began porting the Konfabulator Widget Engine to an embedded Linux platform in 2007 as part of a joint venture with Intel corporation that resulted in an announcement of the Widget Channel in August 2008.

A Samsung Smart TV with a widget for Flickr shown on the left.

On January 4, 2009, Yahoo! And Samsung announced that select models of Samsung's new flat panel HDTVs would support the new TV Widget service. On January 7, 2009, Yahoo! followed up with a broader announcement of distribution partnerships with major television manufacturers Samsung, Sony, LG Electronics, and Vizio, with only a peripheral reference to Intel.

The following year, January 6, 2010, additional partnerships with Hisense, ViewSonic, MIPS Technologies, and Sigma Designs were announced at CES 2011 bringing the Yahoo! Widget Engine to more televisions and consumer electronics platforms. In September 2010, Yahoo! and the Vestel Group announced a partnership to deliver the platform that was now renamed to Yahoo Smart TV, to Europe. Also later in September, Toshiba announced Yahoo! Smart TV support on several models of their televisions.

On November 2, 2011, Yahoo! launched the Yahoo! Smart TV Store with Sony and Toshiba. The Yahoo! Smart TV Store allows developers to offer paid TV apps from 99 cents to $99. The Yahoo! Smart TV Store expanded to VIZIO in late 2012, and, as a part of this, the term "Widgets" was phased out and replaced with "Apps."

On January 9, 2012, Yahoo! and Sony announced Broadcast Interactivity technology available in 2012 Sony BRAVIA televisions. On March 2, 2012, it was announced that Yahoo would be closing down support for the Yahoo Desktop Widget Engine. Yahoo's reason for closure was twofold: The cost of replacing the older servers that supported the gallery, and the refocusing of human resources on the development of the Yahoo! Smart TV widget platform. On November 5, 2012, Yahoo! and Samsung announced an expanded partnership with the addition of support for Broadcast Interactivity.

From 2013 onwards, Vizio became the only manufacturer to use Yahoo! on its TVs. Following Verizon's acquisition of Yahoo! in 2017, Vizio began to phase out Yahoo! on their TVs in favor of its then-new SmartCast platform, and by 2018 they stopped releasing TVs with the platform, which was not reflected on Yahoo's website until October 2020.

In 2025, Yahoo updated the website to announce that the platform would be discontinued after September 30.

== ADK ==
Development of TV Apps were enabled via the Yahoo! App Development Kit or ADK, available for download from the Yahoo! Smart TV website. The App Development kit required Ubuntu Linux as the default operating system, Windows developers must run the Ubuntu operating system on a virtual machine. Only Ubuntu 10.10 was supported although it runs on other derivatives and versions of Ubuntu successfully.

== Widget Distribution ==
TV Widgets were distributed post sale of the television, via the Yahoo! Smart TV Store, scheduled for launch in Fall 2011. The store claimed to reach 135 countries, and enables widget distribution to millions of TVs from Samsung, Sony, Vizio, and Toshiba. All transactions were processed by Yahoo!, and widget prices range from 99 cents to 99 dollars, with developers getting 70% of the revenue after taxes and currency exchange. All widgets must have gone through the Yahoo! approval process before they were accepted for distribution.

== Technology ==
TV Widgets were developed using a combination of HTML, XML and JavaScript. The code is then executed on the Yahoo TV Widget engine running on TV embedded Linux.

== See also ==
- Apple TV
- Boxee
- Google TV
- Hillcrest Labs
- Home theater PC
- Interactive television
- Internet television
- Kylo
- Roku
- Smart TV
- Tivoization
- TV Genius
- WebTV
- XBMC Media Center
