= Fantasy Wars =

2007 video game

- Developer: Ino-Co
- Publishers: EU: 1C Company / Nobilis France; NA: Atari SA
- Director: Aleksey Kozyrev
- Designer: Dmitry Gulin
- Composers: TriHorn Productions, Artem Kolpakov
- Engine: TheEngine
- Platform: Microsoft Windows
- Release: RUS: 31 August 2007; FRA: 28 September 2007; GER: 25 October 2007; NA: 7 November 2007; UK: 14 March 2008
- Genre: Turn-based tactics
- Modes: Single player, multiplayer

Fantasy Wars (Russian: Кодекс Войны; formerly Mythic Wars) is a fantasy turn-based tactical video game developed by Russian studio Ino-Co and published by 1C Company and Atari SA. It was followed by Elven Legacy in 2009.

== Gameplay ==
Fantasy Wars features four playable races (humans, orcs, elves and dwarves). The single-player story includes three campaigns, taking place over a series of tactical hex maps. The game uses a 3D game engine and includes role-playing video game gameplay features such as experience points and skills.

== Plot ==
The game is set in the fantasy world of Illis, inhabited by a diverse and often hostile race. Conflicts between Orcs and Humans are constant, but even these inter-racial wars pale in comparison to the threat posed to the entire world of Illis by the emergence of the dark demon Farrah. Only by uniting will the people of Illis be able to confront this common enemy.

== Release ==
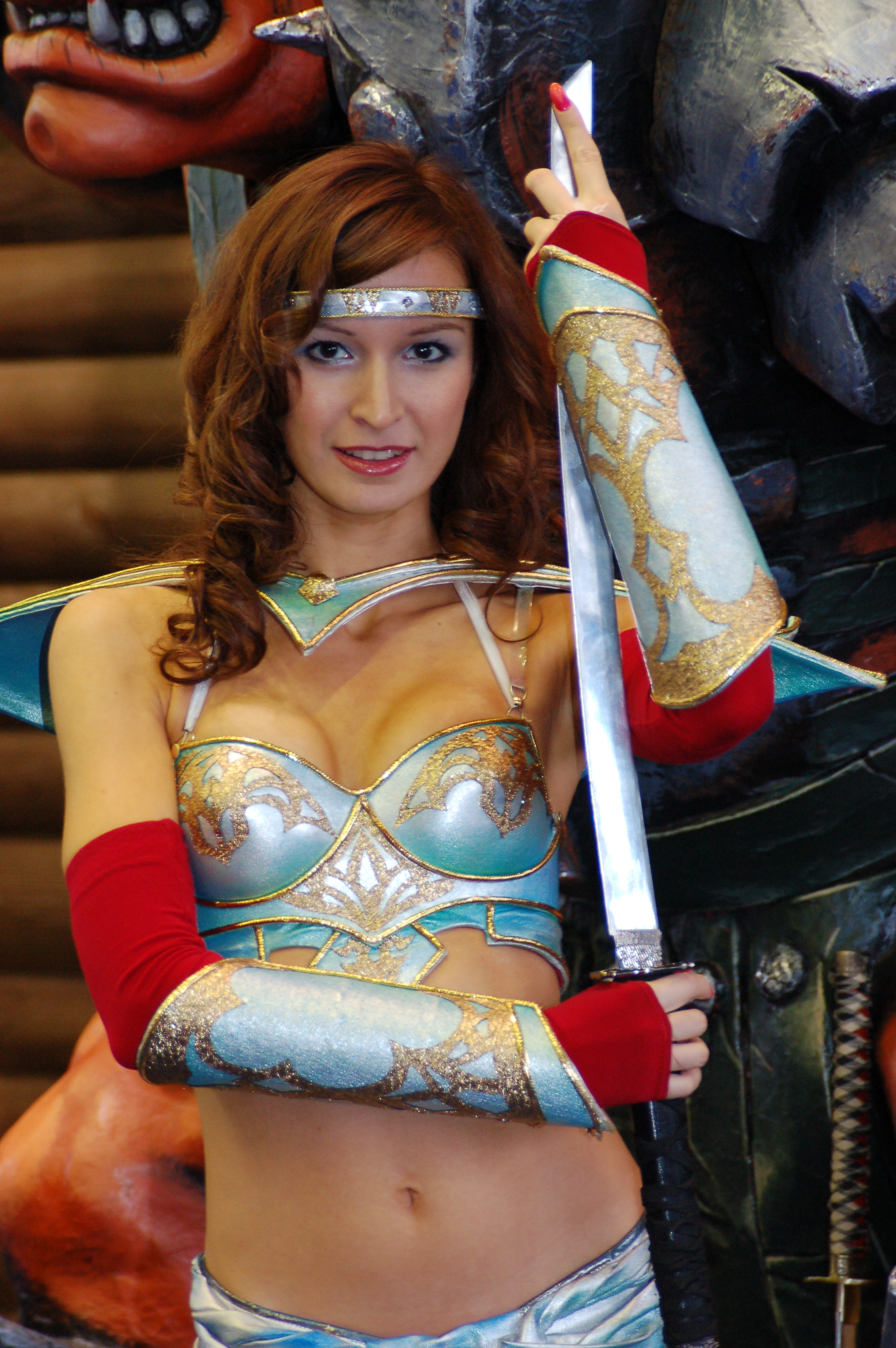
Promotion at IgroMir 2007

Fantasy Wars was distributed electronically by GamersGate and GOG and was published in Europe by Nobilis France. The game is distributed in Scandinavia by Paradox Interactive and in North America by Atari SA.

== Reception ==
Reception

Aggregate score
| Aggregator | Score |
|---|---|
| Metacritic | 67/100 |

Review scores
| Publication | Score |
|---|---|
| 4Players | 74% |
| Eurogamer | 6/10 |
| Gamekult | 6/10 |
| GameSpot | 7.5/10 |
| GameZone | 7.5/10 |
| IGN | 7.8/10 |
| Jeuxvideo.com | 14/20 |
| PC Format | 64% |
| PC Gamer (US) | 54% |
| PC Zone | 35% |

The game received "average" reviews according to the review aggregation website Metacritic.

== Sequel ==
In April 2008, Paradox Interactive announced a sequel to Fantasy Wars entitled Elven Legacy. Elven Legacy is developed by 1C:Ino-Co and was released in April 2009.
