= Rainmeter =

Windows desktop customization tool

- Rainmeter icon

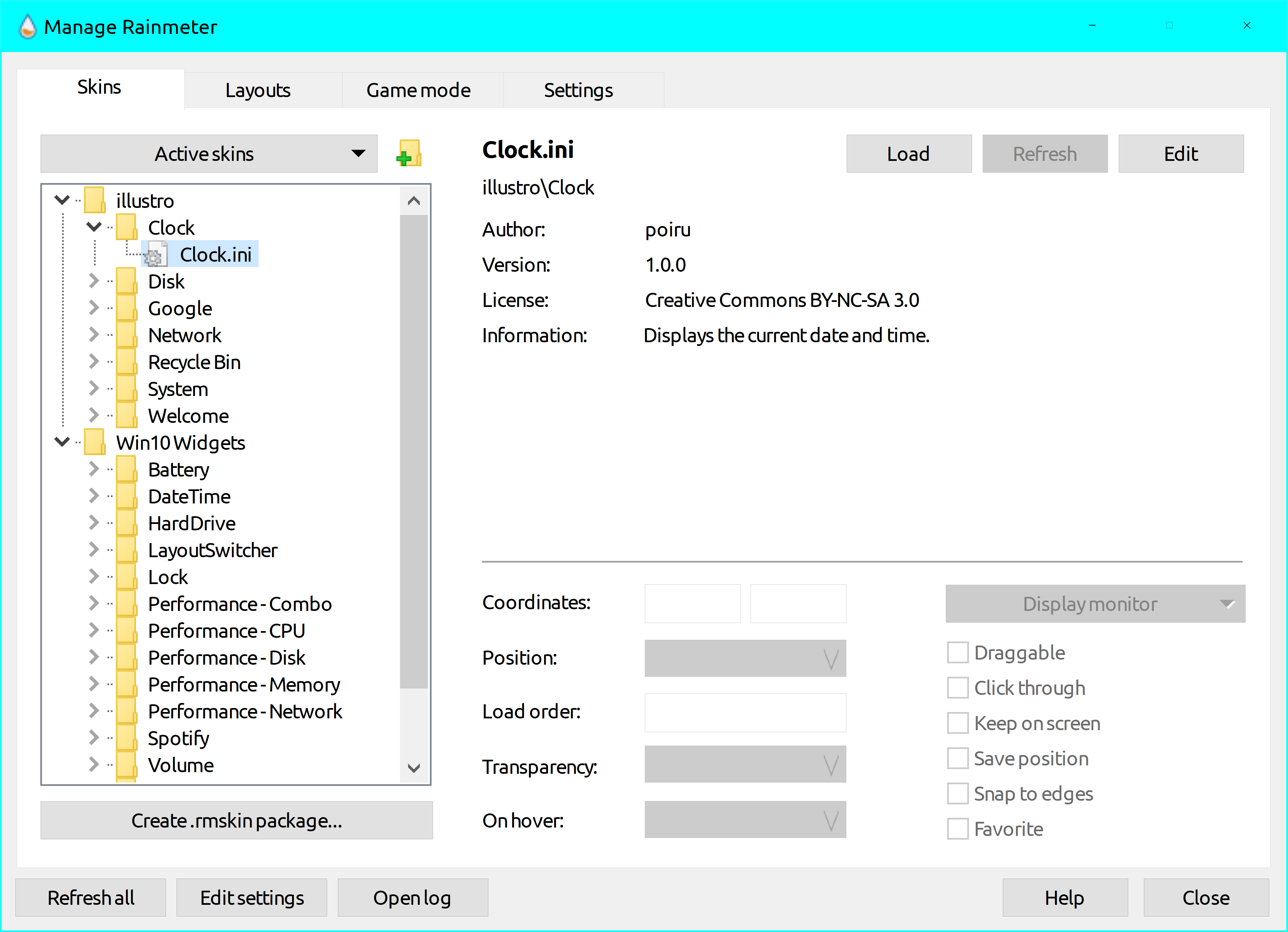
- Rainmeter 4.4 settings panel
- Initial release: 22 February 2001 (25 years ago)
- Stable release: 4.5.26 / 20 May 2026 (1 day ago)
- Written in: C++ and C# used for plugins
- Operating system: Windows 7 SP1 and later
- Platform: IA-32 and x64
- Available in: 32 languages
- License: GNU GPL v2
- Website: www.rainmeter.net
- Repository: github.com/rainmeter/rainmeter

Rainmeter is a free and open-source desktop customization utility for Windows released under the GNU GPL v2 license. It allows users to create and display user-generated customizable desktop widgets or applets called "skins" that display information. Ready to use collections of skins can be downloaded and installed in packages known as "suites".

Common functionalities of Rainmeter skins include desktop clocks, RSS readers, system monitors, weather widgets, application launchers and audio players.

== Development ==
The Rainmeter project was originally founded by Kimmo 'Rainy' Pekkola, the developer of Rainlendar, in 2001. The project is primarily written in C++, while plugins can be written in either C++ or C#.

== Usage ==
Rainmeter skins are written in Rainmeter code using a text editor and stored as INI configuration files. System resource values and other information such as weather or time are stored through "measure" values within a skin, which can then be shown through different kinds of customizable visual elements called "meters".

== Reception ==
CNET, in a 4 out of 5 star rating, praised the software's flexibility, wide variety of themes and "enthusiastic community", while noting the program "isn't as intuitive as it could be." Softpedia also gave the software a 4 out of 5 star rating, citing its comprehensive tutorials and low system resource usage, while criticizing its lack of cross-platform support.
