= Sol Survivor =

2009 video game

- Developer(s): Cadenza Interactive
- Engine: XNA
- Platform(s): Xbox 360, Microsoft Windows
- Release: Xbox LIVE Indie Games: NA: September 2009; Windows (Steam, Impulse): NA: March 15, 2010
- Genre(s): Tower defense
- Mode(s): Single-player, multiplayer

Sol Survivor is an independent tower defense video game developed by American studio Cadenza Interactive. It was released in September 2009 on Xbox 360 via Xbox LIVE Indie Games and on March 15, 2010 on Windows via Steam and Impulse.

== Features ==
Sol Survivor is distinguished in part by an interactive "support" mechanic, allowing players to assist their stationary defenses with additional damage or effects deployed from orbit. This gives players a limited direct ability to destroy aliens (as opposed to being restricted to building towers and watching the towers destroy aliens.)

Another distinctive feature of Sol Survivor is that it offers multiple game modes, several of which allow players to team up against the aliens. These include:

- Single Player and Co-op Campaign - Play solo or team up with friends in preset story scenarios.
- Single Player and Co-op Survival - Play solo or team up with friends to outlast increasingly difficult waves of creeps.
- Wars - Send creeps at enemy players and defend oneself from creeps sent by enemy players. (Multiplayer only)
- Versus - Outlast enemy players fighting against preset waves of creeps.
- Co-op - Team up and defend a shared base against preset waves of creeps.
- Duo - Split the turret building and support roles between two players for a casual game.

== Story ==
The single-player campaign places the player in the role of a young commander rising through the ranks in a time of war. The story progresses across four planets, with each planetary campaign consisting of five missions. Each planet is under siege by the Ascendancy, a race of cult-like aliens that use the souls of sentient beings to power their technology. The player represents the Sol Paragon, a well-organized and democratic vestige of humanity in space. As a member of the Sol Paragon fleet, the player is tasked with keeping the Ascendancy from stealing the souls and other resources they need to continue their conquest of the galaxy.

== Gameplay ==
Creeps in Sol Survivor take preset paths from a spawn node to a colony. The player must defend the colony by placing turrets and by calling in support abilities from orbit. As the player cannot force the creeps into a maze, turrets must defeat creeps as they walk by. Turrets are capable of interfering with and slowing down creeps, in addition to damaging them. Support helps to finish off creeps or to keep creeps in the range of turrets longer to maximize the latter's effect.
