= Elemental: Fallen Enchantress =

2012 video game

- Developer: Stardock
- Publisher: Stardock
- Producers: Brad Wardell; Derek Paxton
- Designers: Derek Paxton; Jon Shafer; Raymond Bartos
- Programmer: Brad Wardell
- Artist: Paul Boyer
- Writer: Dave Stern
- Platform: Microsoft Windows
- Release: October 23, 2012
- Genres: 4X, turn-based strategy
- Mode: Single-player

Elemental: Fallen Enchantress is a turn-based strategy video game developed and published by Stardock for Microsoft Windows in 2012. The game is set in a fantasy world where players take control of a sovereign, a powerful leader, tasked with rebuilding a shattered kingdom while navigating political intrigue, managing resources, and engaging in tactical battles.

== Gameplay ==
Elemental: Fallen Enchantress has a single-player campaign, and a nonlinear "sandbox" game-play. Outside the campaign, players win by conquering or allying with other factions, fulfilling a master quest or casting a spell of making. The player controls a pre-built or custom sovereign leading a faction with different characteristics affecting gameplay. The sovereign founds the faction's capital city and may then be sent to explore the world or govern the settlement. Multiple settlements can be built by other units, but city building sites may be far between. Settlements can research technologies, build military units or town improvements or harvest nearby resources. As settlements grow they become specialized in economy, research or military might. Outposts can be built to harvest resources in places without city sites.

The sovereign or other recruited heroes may do quests to gain experience, gildar (the game's currency), or other benefits. Heroes may also fight alongside military units. Military units can also be customized, allowing the player to make unique units that fits the current technology or resource level, reminiscent of Alpha Centauri.

The world is a magical place where elemental shards may be harvested and cannibalized as mana to spellcasting heroes. Crystals can be used to give units special abilities. Spells can be used to alter the world, improve a city or to heal, hurt or alter the abilities of military units. A magic user can master one or several elements: fire, air, water, earth and life (or death, depending on the hero's proficiencies). Each element gives access to unique spells, while some spells require knowledge of more than one element or special research.

Research is divided in three different technology trees: civilization, warfare and magic. New and improved technologies allow the user to build improved buildings, better weapons or to access new abilities or spells.

Heroes or the sovereign can seek out special location to receive quests. Quests may involve escorting nobles, fighting bandits or joining a tournament. Completing a quest is usually rewarded by receiving a special item, gilder, or influence. Quest locations are marked, like armies, with a strength that reveals the likelihood of surviving the quest.

Fallen Enchantress has a built in "workshop" allowing the user to modify the game. Tiles, maps and factions are among the many things that can be changed, and modifying the xml-scripts directly open many possibilities. The ingame modding workshop also includes a particle editor, allowing the creation of custom particle and spell effects. Elemental, Fallen Enchantress is supported at NexusMods.

== Plot ==
The game is set in Elemental, a world once filled with magic that used to house magnificent civilizations. This world has been ravaged by war, and has been torn apart by Titans, immortal beings who sought to control the world. The game is the story about the survivors. The Kingdoms of the West are dominated by men and value the power of the individuals, while the Empires of the East who are dominated by other races believe in raw strength and strive to increase their power.

== Development and release ==
After generally poor reviews of the 2010 Elemental: War of Magic, Stardock decided to remake the game anew and provide a free copy to early registered buyers of 2010's Elemental. Fallen Enchantress was produced by Brad Wardell and had Derek Paxton, also known as "Kael", as lead designer. In May 2013, Stardock released the stand-alone expansion Fallen Enchantress: Legendary Heroes.

== Reception ==
Reception

Aggregate score
Aggregator	Score
Metacritic	78/100

Review scores
Publication	Score
Game Informer	8.25/10
GameSpot	8/10
GameSpy	3.5/5
IGN	7.9/10
PC Gamer (US)	85/100

The first reviews were positive, citing the random map generator, customization of units and factions, and unique mechanics such as population growth being divided by the number of cities. Monotonous sound design, minimal effects, and graphics that become blurry at high levels of zoom are raised as minor complaints. A variety of mechanics favoring small groups of experienced units over larger groups of less experienced units leaves the AI wanting for strategic ability.

GameSpot's Brett Todd gave the game an 8 out of 10, describing it as "something of an apology letter" for the poorly received War of Magic and praising its empire building and challenging enemy forces, though he noted a steep learning curve and repetitive tactical battles. PC Gamer's Tom Francis scored it 85 out of 100, stating that the core game had been fixed from its predecessor and praising the range of strategic possibilities, but criticized the AI for lacking aggression and noted that a single large army of archers could defeat most other approaches.
