= Dead Man's Draw =

2015 mobile card video game

- Developer: Stardock
- Publisher: Stardock
- Platforms: iOS, Windows
- Release: WW: October 8, 2015
- Genre: Strategy
- Mode: Single-player

Dead Man's Draw is a strategic card game application developed for Apple (iOS) and Windows, published by Stardock. It was first developed for iOS, releasing on 8 October 2015. This release was followed by a PC port, released on the Steam marketplace on 6 February 2016. A tabletop version of the game was published by MayDay Games and released on 11 April 2015.

== Gameplay ==
The game is played by 2-4 players in 10-15 minute sessions. Each player takes turns drawing cards one at a time with the aim of collecting the most possible loot. There are ten suits each with six different cards. When different suits are drawn in the turn, the amount of loot (treasure) keeps growing. When two cards of the same suit are drawn, the turn is a bust. The possible cards that may be drawn:

- 60 Loot Cards, divided into ten different suits, ranging in value from 2-7 (except for the mermaids which range from 4-9)
- 17 Trait Cards which give each player special abilities that can be used during the course of the game.
- 6 Game Variant Cards, that modify how the game is played.
- 4 Gameplay Cards.
- 4 Suit Ability Reference Cards.
- 3 Mermaid Variant Cards.

== Reception ==
Reception

Aggregate score
Aggregator	Score
Metacritic	78/100

Review scores
Publication	Score
IGN	6.2/10
GameZebo	4.5/5
