= Stardock Central =

Software content delivery and digital rights management system

- Developer: Stardock
- Operating system: Microsoft Windows
- Type: Content delivery
- License: Proprietary / Freeware
- Website: http://www.stardock.com/products/sdcentral/

Stardock Central was a software content delivery and digital rights management system used by Stardock customers to access components of the Object Desktop, TotalGaming.net and ThinkDesk product lines, as well as products under the WinCustomize brand.

Introduced in 2001 to access games on TotalGaming.net (then known as the Drengin Network), Stardock Central was later expanded to cover all Stardock products, replacing Component Manager (1999).

As of 2010, Stardock Central had been phased out in favour of its successor, Impulse. However, in March 2011 Impulse was sold to GameStop and Stardock soon reopened their own online store. As of April 2012, the Stardock Central software has been revived and released as a Beta to once again provide a proprietary platform for Stardock's digital product downloads.

== Features ==
Software on Stardock Central was divided into components, and further divided into packages. When users purchased a product or a subscription, they gained access to it via Stardock Central. The program had the ability to break products into components so that users on slower connections could start using the main portion of the software as soon as possible, and download extras — such as in-game movies or music — at a later date.

To cater for the various frequent updates provided for many products, once a package has been downloaded and installed Stardock Central only downloaded updated files for new versions. A product archiving and restore function was available to back up components and to allow their transfer to other computers. Users could also use the program to interact on Stardock's discussion boards or access the Stardock IRC server via a built-in IRC client. WinCustomize subscribers could use the Skins and Themes section to browse and download the WinCustomize library.

Stardock Central was similar in concept to the later-developed Steam content delivery system; unlike Steam, it did not require a permanent connection to the Internet, only being required when a user wanted to install or update a product (or when needed for its chatting, content libraries, or forum support).

== History ==
While Stardock Central started development in 2001, it got its biggest test in March 2003 when Galactic Civilizations was launched simultaneously at retail and online — the first commercial PC game to debut in both venues at once. Those who had purchased Galactic Civilizations at retail could also enter their serial number and download updates to the game. In 2004, Stardock Central began to deliver third party content as well such as games from Take 2, Strategy First, and Ubisoft. The Political Machine was released in 2004, and in 2005, TotalGaming.net phase 2 was released, adding over a dozen new third-party games.

== See also ==
- Digital distribution
