= DesktopX =

Windows desktop enhancement program

- Objects may be combined to make themes
- Developer: Stardock
- Stable release: 3.5 / July 2008
- Operating system: Microsoft Windows
- Type: Desktop customization
- License: Shareware
- Website: http://www.stardock.com/products/desktopx/

DesktopX was a shareware desktop enhancement program that allowed users to build their own custom desktops. Amongst its features was a complete widget engine for Windows as well as a desktop object system. User creations could be exported as .desktop files or as widgets. The program was distributed with Object Desktop as well as stand-alone.

DesktopX was released by Alberto Riccio in 1999 as VDE (Verona Desktop Enhancer), and bought in 2000 by Stardock. Mini-applications created with it were called "object packs" but later rebranded as "widgets" to standardize the term.

Most users used DesktopX to build alternative desktop environments. The mini-application creation ability was there from the start but did not gain widespread use until the release of DesktopX 2 in 2003. Current versions run on Windows 2000 and above.

DesktopX is no longer for sale by its author and is not actively supported.

== Overview ==
DesktopX supports the creation of three different types of widgets:

- objects; loaded into a running DesktopX environment.
- widgets; groups of objects packaged into executables that require DesktopX (equivalent to Yahoo! Widget Engine widgets).
- gadgets; totally standalone widgets provided as applications.

Objects may be controlled by scripts written in either VBScript or JScript, although they are not always required.

Many common actions are provided for as in-built object functions, such as:

- running a program.
- displaying a menu containing the contents of a folder.
- emptying the Recycle Bin.

Similarly, animation, sound and variation depending on the object's state (for example, mouseover or clicking) can be modified without scripting.

DesktopX plugins also avoid the need for scripting common tasks, by offering extra functionality such as media player displays and controls (currently available for iTunes, Winamp, CoolPlayer, an internal version of Windows Media Player and Stardock's own ObjectMedia) and access to Windows Management Instrumentation.

As users often wish to have a uniform desktop style, a common practice is to create several widgets as a coherent theme. A few popular artists sell themes in the WinCustomize store.

As of 2010 there are three main standalone divisions of DesktopX:

- DesktopX Client, which allows the use of desktops, widgets and objects.
- DesktopX Standard, which includes the DesktopX Builder that creates objects and widgets as well as desktops.
- DesktopX Pro, which allows the creation of gadgets that may be sold as separate applications or used to promote a website.

DesktopX Standard may also be obtained as part of an Object Desktop subscription. Corporations may purchase DesktopX Enterprise, allowing the creation of secure desktops.

== Gadgets ==
In 2003, Stardock released DesktopX 2 Pro, which allowed developers to export their creations as stand-alone programs called "gadgets". This feature was enhanced with DesktopX 3 and the price on DesktopX Pro lowered to make it more mainstream.

== Version history ==
An (incomplete) list of releases:

- August 2000: First beta versions released to Object Desktop subscribers.
- June 2001: DesktopX 1.0 released.
- April 2002: DesktopX 1.1 released - adds scripting support.
- October 2003: DesktopX 2.0 released - includes IconX.
- March 2005: DesktopX 3.0 released - better support for gadgets, internationalization.
- July 2005: DesktopX 3.1 released - new APIs for developers, new UI for users.
- July 2008: DesktopX 3.5 released - full Windows Vista support with the ability to export to Windows Desktop Gadgets
