= Sacraboar =

2009 video game

- Developer(s): Makivision Games
- Publisher(s): Makivision Games
- Designer(s): Oliver Silski
- Engine: NeoAxis
- Platform(s): Microsoft Windows
- Release: NA: November 6, 2009
- Genre(s): real-time strategy
- Mode(s): Single-player, multiplayer

Sacraboar is a capture the flag style real-time strategy video game developed by Makivision Games for Windows. The game was released on November 6, 2009.

== Gameplay ==
The goal of the game is to capture the enemy BOAR trophy and return it to your base while you still control your own BOAR trophy. There are seven different units available, which all play different roles. One unit is a builder unit that can transform into tower which will either give you spells to cast on units or more resources to buy units.
