= Elemental: War of Magic =

2010 video game

- Standard edition cover art
- Developer: Stardock
- Publisher: Stardock: AU: N3V Games/Auran
- Producer: Scott Tykoski
- Designer: Brad Wardell
- Programmers: Cari Begle; Jesse Brindle; Brad Wardell
- Artists: Paul Boyer; Jeu Li; Kay Fedewa
- Writers: David Stern; Brad Wardell; Scott Tykoski
- Composer: Mason Fisher
- Platform: Windows
- Release: August 24, 2010
- Genres: 4X, turn-based strategy
- Modes: Single-player, multiplayer

Elemental: War of Magic is a fantasy 4X turn-based strategy game developed and published by Stardock, released on August 24, 2010.

Stardock calls Elemental "a strategy game in a role-playing world." The game revolves around exploration, city-building, resource management and conquest, but also incorporates quests and detailed unit design.

Stardock has released four further turn-based strategy games set in the world of Elemental: Elemental: Fallen Enchantress, in October 2012, Fallen Enchantress: Legendary Heroes, in May 2013, Sorcerer King, in July 2015, and Sorcerer King: Rivals, in September 2016. Following the release of Fallen Enchantress, Stardock discontinued Elemental: War of Magic and no longer sells the game.

In March 2026 Stardock released a remaster named Elemental: Reforged.

== Plot ==
The game is set in a world once filled with magic, which comes to form the basis of human civilization. Immortal beings known as the Titans were attracted to the world by construction of the reality-warping Forge of the Overlord, an artifact able to create magical items.

While engaged in civil war, the Titans imprison the world's magic in a number of elemental shards. At first, only they could use the magic within the shards. In time, human channelers arose to challenge the Titans.

Ensuing battles lead to the destruction of the Forge, and ultimately the land itself. A century later, the player leads a faction of humans or Fallen (corrupted life-forms created by the Titans) in a still-devastated world, able to renew it with magic – or pervert it to their will. Human kingdoms sometimes band together against the empires of the Fallen, but each faction strives for ultimate dominance.

== Gameplay ==
Elemental has a single-player campaign, minimal support for multiplayer, no local play (LAN) (despite being advertised), and nonlinear "sandbox" gameplay. Outside the campaign, players win by conquering or allying with other factions, or rebuilding the Forge. Forge pieces may be quested for, or created by learning and casting the Spell of Making, requiring control of all elemental shards.

Players control a pre-built or custom sovereign and belong to a faction; each has characteristics affecting gameplay. Influence over land and resources is gained by founding cities, introducing the ability to train characters and research spells and technologies. Cities can be improved to provide additional space or generate money, resources or prestige (a factor in population growth).

Elemental incorporates many features of role-playing video games. Each character in the game is individually named and outfitted through a character editor, with statistics increasing with experience. Units may be combined into armies to fight more dangerous or numerous opponents. Combat takes place on a separate tactical map, although battles may normally be auto-resolved.

Quests and useful items are scattered randomly across the land, as are wandering monsters and neutral characters; the latter may be hired with gildar, the game's currency. Both may be fought for experience and treasure, although attacking civilians decreases the sovereign's reputation. The number of quests available increases over time as adventuring technologies are unlocked.

Players may negotiate with each other to exchange money, material goods, or diplomatic capital (but not technology), and to enter into treaties and alliances; however, the ability to do so must first be researched. Factors affecting negotiation include race, relative military strength, current relations, trade routes, treaties, character, traits, and family connections.

Gameplay varies depending on the chosen faction. Human kingdoms tend to focus on government and civilization, while the empires of the Fallen are more about individual units.

Executive producer Scott Tykoski compared the game to Viva Piñata, but substituting "shovels and creatures filled with candy for swords and creatures filled with dark magic". Designer Brad Wardell said that players should expect to reach "a Sauron or Morgoth level of power" by the end of the game.

=== Multiplayer ===
Before the game was released the developers were talking about a 16-way multiplayer. It wasn't until version 1.08b 09/16/2010 that multiplayer was enabled, but at first it was enabled as a beta for the consumers to test. As of version 1.4 the multiplayer still only supported small maps, which is not enough for 16 players.

=== Magic ===
Magic resides in crystal shards named after the elements; earth, air, fire, and water. Spells (which must be researched before use) belong to a number of thematic spellbooks, some of which are unavailable at the start of the game. Players may learn individual spells at their current level, or devote their research to unlocking higher spell levels. While magic-users may cast researched spells from any spellbook possessed by their faction, controlling shards greatly amplifies the potency of spells which use the relevant elements.

Sovereigns start with a certain amount of magical essence, determining how much mana they have, and so how many spells they may cast. They may imbue essence into champions, granting limited power at the cost of their own abilities. Essence may also be expended by sovereigns to escape death and return to a nearby settlement. Marriages involving magic-using characters may result in children with magical skills of their own.

=== Research ===
Research is based on reclaiming lost technologies from libraries scattered around the world. Players may direct research to one of five categories; humans and Fallen have separate technology trees.

The chance of gaining a particular technology varies – some are not even offered until a breakthrough is made – so the technology gained may only be picked once the research is complete. The cost of research within a category increases as technologies are researched, making the order of research important.

=== Artificial intelligence ===
Players face up to nine computer-controlled factions, neutral cities, bandits and monsters. Neutral cities may be conquered by players or destroyed by bandits and monsters.

The artificial intelligence has two modes of operation: basic and advanced. Basic algorithms are not CPU-intensive, but are not as good as the advanced ones. The chance of using advanced algorithms for a decision – the intelligence factor – varies between difficulty levels. At "challenging", this factor reaches 100%. Some low difficulty levels prohibit the AI from using combat magic, and penalize their economy, hit points and/or starting funds. At higher levels, the AI acquires bonuses; the highest permits the AI to see through the fog of war.

== Development ==
Stardock originally intended to purchase the rights to Master of Magic from Atari, but decided to create their own universe, due in part to issues of compliance and code ownership.

The campaign story was developed with assistance from Random House's Del Rey subsidiary.

Elemental's art style was based on the work of Alphonse Mucha – in particular, his use of "hard lines and soft tones on realistic forms" – and designed for "minimal overhead" so the game might be played on "a crappy netbook."

In March 2010, Stardock CEO Brad Wardell estimated that the game would cost US$5 million to develop. Later in July, he said the game cost approximately half that.

Wardell also indicated Stardock's intention to develop free updates and addons to the game after release, as well as several expansion packs:

When games come out, that's the end of development, but we don't consider our game done - it won't be done for years, because there's so much stuff we can do. So after release we have tons of new quests we want to come out with, we're going to be adding new factions to the game to help liven things up further, we have a ton of new map styles we want to put in - all kinds of crazy new stuff we can put in here.

Early versions of Elemental were provided throughout the development cycle to those who had pre-ordered. The last such version was on August 22, two days before the scheduled release.

The developers planned to allow players to have their worlds populated with player-made mods, accessible from a moderated central database. The game contains an interactive tile editor, and its engine uses only dynamic light sources.

== Features ==
The game engine, Kumquat, provides a user interface able to zoom from a cloth map to a 3D representation of individual buildings and units. 3D objects have variable level of detail, while location names are positioned dynamically on the cloth map. The limited edition includes a poster, canvas map, 20-track music CD, mini-encyclopedia, and a pewter dragon figurine. Copies sold by Best Buy and Walmart had early access to content that could be distributed to all players 90 days after release.

Elemental uses Havok middleware for physics and animation and Bink video. Multiplayer is handled using Stardock's Impulse Reactor; players may use Facebook credentials to log in. The retail copy of the game shipped without any form of digital rights management; however, a legal copy is required to access updates and free addons to the game. Originally users were required to register the game via the Impulse software in order to download updates, but after Impulse was sold to Gamestop updates are also available through Stardock's own website. The Elemental soundtrack was composed by Mason Fisher.

== Other media ==
A novel, Elemental: Destiny's Embers (ISBN 0345517865), was published by Random House to accompany the game. The book is set after the time of the game itself, and involves the quest of a former messenger to save mankind from the Fallen. It came with a coupon for exclusive downloadable content.

== Reception ==
Reception

Aggregate scores
Aggregator	Score
GameRankings	56.57%
Metacritic	53%

Review scores
Publication	Score
1Up.com	C+
Game Informer	6.5/10
GamePro	3.5/5
GameSpot	4/10
GameZone	3/10
IGN	6/10
PC Gamer (US)	70/100

Elemental has an average rating of 53% on review aggregator Metacritic, with grades ranging from 72% to 30%. Reviewers criticized the game for technical issues, problems with core game concepts, and poor GUI and documentation, but praised its ambition and strategic flexibility.

Due to severe technical problems, PC Gamer, GameSpot and GamePro delayed reviewing the game until post-release patches were available.

Game Informer criticized the game's lack of polish and broken combat system, stating that Elemental failed to combine excellent individual features into a cohesive game. PC Gamer felt the game's ambition and sense of discovery were let down by inadequate AI. G4 said the game felt like "a work in progress", lacking documentation and polish, and called it a victim of an over-ambitious design. 1UP.com also criticized the AI and over-ambitious design, concluding that the game "just isn't fun" due to crashes and "a poorly designed GUI". Tom Chick called the game "disappointingly primitive", lacking clarity and purpose, and in need of "the work it should have gotten when it was in beta, if not earlier". For GameSpot, Elemental's "solid game foundation" and "many worthy ideas and ambitions" were impeded by a wide range of problems including frequent crashes, disappointing visuals, a poor interface, bad AI and unsatisfying tactical combat. GamePro felt that the game's complexity and lack of focus may be off-putting, but fans of the 4X genre would find a fun game underneath the bugs and lack of tutorials. IGN called the game "strangely engaging" despite its instability and inaccessibility issues, concluding that Elemental was "a game with some great ideas that just haven't been implemented as well as they could be".

Many reviewers felt the game had the potential for significant improvement with sufficient patching, citing Stardock's track record of post-release support.

Elemental's designer Brad Wardell agreed with the negative reviews. He ascribed the game problems to insufficient QA process and misuse of RAM Memory and "[his] own catastrophic poor judgment in not objectively evaluating the core game play components". Stardock engaged in layoffs after a poor launch.

=== Sales ===
As of September 5, 2010, Stardock reported that Elemental: War of Magic has sold approximately 82,000 copies.
