= Klipfolio Inc. =

Software company in Canada

Klipfolio, Inc.
- Type: Private
- Industry: Analytics and Business intelligence software
- Founded: 2001
- Founders: Allan Wille; Peter Matthews
- Headquarters: Ottawa, Canada
- Area served: Global
- Key people: Allan Wille (CEO); Peter Matthews (CXO)
- Products: PowerMetrics, Klips, MetricHQ
- Website: https://www.klipfolio.com

Klipfolio Inc., is a Canadian software company founded in 2001 and headquartered in Ottawa, Ontario. The company initially focused on the consumer market, and later moved into the dashboard and business intelligence space. On Feb 25, 2015 they announced a series A round of $6.2 million and in 2017 they raised $12M Series B Funding.

== Products ==
Klipfolio provides business intelligence tools, including an online dashboard platform, an analytics platform for managing business metrics, and a public library of metric definitions.

Klipfolio Klips lets users connect to data sources, apply transformations through a built-in formula editor, and display the results as dashboards that can be shared with other users or sent as scheduled email reports

Klipfolio PowerMetrics is an analytics platform designed to help organizations define, manage, track and analyze standardized business metrics.

The company also maintains MetricHQ, an online library of business metric definitions.

== History ==
Serence is the former name of the Canadian corporation, which was formed in 2001 when Allan Wille (CEO) and Peter Matthews (chief experience officer – CXO) pursued their vision of a simple application that assembles current information from multiple sources into a single, consistent, and coherent presentation format. Wille and Matthews were joined by James Scott (CTO).

The first version of Klipfolio Dashboard appeared later that year as a desktop application. As an early RSS reader, it used the technology to populate various "Klips".

In 2002, the application evolved to include a JavaScript-based semantic markup language which created relationships among disparate bits of data, presented data more consistently, and allowed a developer to create and modify Klips. Additionally, the company adopted a clean design philosophy. Some of the technology used for "Klips" was patented.

To avoid various integration and performance challenges associated with off-the-shelf code, the research and development team opted for proprietary internal systems including an XML parser, HTTP stack and novel CSS-based matching architecture. These developments were all designed to fit within a core code package less than 500 KB.

By 2007, the company's primary focus had shifted to the operational business intelligence market. For enterprise, Klipfolio Dashboard is used to increase the visibility of business-critical information of key performance indicators (KPI) from different corporate databases and applications.

In 2008, Serence rebranded the company as Klipfolio Inc. to take advantage of brand recognition of Klipfolio Dashboard in the marketplace. The move reflected an increased emphasis by the firm on the enterprise or business dashboard market.

In late 2011, Klipfolio launched Klipfolio Dashboard as a cloud-hosted service.

In January 2017, Klipfolio successfully raised $12 million CDN in a Series B funding round. This investment was led by OMERS Ventures, with participation from all investors from Klipfolio's 2015 Series A and 2014 seed rounds. This funding brought the company's total funding to $19.4 million. The capital infusion aimed to fuel the company's growth, focusing on enhancing its cloud-based dashboard capabilities and expanding its customer base, which had doubled annually since its first round of funding. By this time, Klipfolio was serving over 7,000 customers globally and planned to use the new funds to invest in product development, build new mobile experiences, and deliver a variety of pre-built visualizations and dashboards.
