= Elven Legacy =

2007 video game

- Developer: 1C: Ino-Co
- Publisher: Paradox Interactive
- Directors: Aleksey Kozyrev; Max Bodrikov
- Producer: Maxim Voznyuk
- Designers: Dmitriy Gulin; Paul Kondrashov; Max Bodrikov
- Programmers: Alexey Bersenev; Alexander Ivolgin
- Writers: Paul Kondrashov; Aleksey Kozyrev; Max Bodrikov
- Composers: TriHorn Productions, Artem Kolpakov
- Engine: TheEngine
- Platforms: Microsoft Windows, Mac OS X (late 2011)
- Release: RUS: December 21, 2007; NA: April 7, 2009; EU: April 9, 2009
- Genre: Strategy
- Modes: Single-player, multiplayer

Elven Legacy is a turn-based strategy video game developed by 1C:Ino-Co and published by Paradox Interactive. Released in Russia in 2007 and elsewhere in 2009 for Microsoft Windows, the game is a sequel to Fantasy Wars. On October 11, 2011, Virtual Programming released Elven Legacy Collection, which includes the original game and its three expansion packs, for Mac OS X.

== Gameplay ==
The gameplay, like its predecessor, Fantasy Wars, is a turn-based strategy game. The player moves its units, each representing a single hero or a small soldier company, through hexagonal maps dictating where they go and when they attack. Once all units have exhausted both their move points and their (single) action for the turn the pc-controlled enemies (or the other human players, if online) start their movements and actions. As with Fantasy Wars, units are inspired by the typical fantasy races in a fantasy-medieval setting. Usually, a mission requires a certain list of objectives to fulfill (kill certain enemies, or reach a certain town on the map) with "prizes" awarded at the end of the mission based on how many turns the player needed to achieve them.

== Plot ==
Elven Legacy was developed by 1C: Ino-Co. The game presents a time when five races existed: elves, orcs, humans, the undead, and dwarves. The races are in conflict for possession of one land where the orcs once have been driven away by the human race. A hundred years later, the orcs prepare for a war to recapture their motherland. At the same time, the other races declare war against the human race in an effort to capture the territory in which humans lived. The player can either choose to play as the elves or the orcs.

== Development ==
The graphics of Elven Legacy were implemented due to multiple reasons. One of these reasons was that they were inspired by World of Warcraft, but the other was the reason was that their research showed that players did not resonate as well with its initially "grim and dark [world] with realistic looking textures and light." As part of this research, the game's lead artist experimented by coloring a screenshot by hand. They liked how this look, and felt it would be a good idea to make a serious game that was "fun to look at.

== Reception ==
Reception

Aggregate score
Aggregator	Score
Metacritic	71/100

Review scores
Publication	Score
4Players	69%
GameSpot	7.5/10
GameStar	69%
GameZone	7/10
IGN	7.7/10
MeriStation	7.5/10
PC Format	48%
PC Gamer (UK)	74%
PC PowerPlay	7/10
PC Zone	67%

The game received "mixed or average reviews" according to the review aggregation website Metacritic.

== Expansions ==
At E3 2009, Paradox Interactive announced the expansion pack Elven Legacy: Ranger. The Ranger expansion adds 16 new missions, three new heroes, five unique artifacts, and 12 new spells.

Elven Legacy: Siege was released on November 17, 2009. The expansion includes large-scale battles of large armies, and the capture of many-hexed cities. The expansion has the following new features: a campaign consisting of 19 missions with a nonlinear storyline; control of two armies; three new heroes; and bonus missions.

Elven Legacy: Magic was released on December 3, 2009. This expansion is the most recent in the series of games about the world of Illis. The expansion has the following new features: new heroes, unusual tactical possibilities, new spells and artifacts, and bonus missions.

On June 21, Virtual Programming announced the original Elven Legacy title was to be brought to the Mac OS X platform in late 2009. The publisher shipped the game, along with the three expansion packs, for Mac OS X on October 11, 2011.
