= WindowBlinds =

Windows user interface customization software

- Developer: Stardock
- Stable release: 11.07 / 10 September 2025; 12 months ago
- Operating system: Microsoft Windows
- Size: 113 MB (setup size)
- Type: Operating system customization
- License: Trialware
- Website: stardock.com/products/windowblinds/

WindowBlinds is a computer program that allows users to skin the Windows graphical user interface. It has been developed by Stardock since 1998, and is the most popular component of their flagship software suite, Object Desktop. It is also available separately, and as an ActiveX/COM component called DirectSkin. Introduced in its sixth version, it supports alpha blending effects similar to the compositing of Windows Vista, but on Windows XP.

WindowBlinds has been downloaded over 10 million times and was voted "Best Vertical Market Program or Utility" in the 2006 Shareware Industry Awards Foundation People's Choice Awards. As of November 2009 there were 4448 WindowBlinds skins available at WinCustomize, with an average of nine being added per week.

== History ==
WindowBlinds started in 1998 when lead developer Neil Banfield teamed up with Stardock. Stardock was looking for a developer to create a window skinning application, and Banfield had already created an application that he called "Window Blinds" in 1997. Previous attempts by Stardock had included "Object Look", a minimal skinning application, and "WindowFX", an application written in Delphi. That name would later be reused for WindowFX, also created by Banfield. For a short time there was also a scaled-back version of the original Window Blinds called "WBLiteFX", a name which was still present in WindowBlinds registry settings as of May 2006.

WindowBlinds (now re-branded as one word) quickly made its way to a 1.0 release, driven by the requests of users to add "freeform skinning" (customizable window border shapes), sounds, and animation. Scrollbars, the task bar, the start button, menu items, the menu itself, and other GUI elements were added later.

WindowBlinds 2 was a major redesign in C++ that added the following features:

- The "Basic" (UIS1+) format, which offered greater program compatibility in exchange for a restricted feature set.
- Compound skins (later known as "subskins") which made it easier to provide alternative versions of a skin. For example, a Macintosh skin could now have two subskins to offer control buttons at the left or right of the window.
- User skin recoloring.
- Scripting, though this was not widely used.
- Font and color sections for specific controls and states.
- Support for additional controls.

At this time, "BuilderBlinds"—re-branded as SkinStudio in February 2001—became a popular tool, as it enabled artists to create skins without spending a deal of time learning the intricacies of the UIS format. It also allowed experienced users to avoid trivial errors.

WindowBlinds 3 accompanied the release of Windows XP, which contained its own skinning system called "visual styles". It was thought that visual styles might deal a blow to commercial skinning systems. This proved not to be the case; in fact, sales of WindowBlinds rose, buoyed by a new set of users who had seen the changes offered by visual styles and wanted more. Even after modifications known as "uxtheme hacks" (named after the file they modified, uxtheme.dll) became available, WindowBlinds remained popular, since it had additional features that visual styles did not.

WindowBlinds skins can be animated; ChristmasTime, for example, has falling snowflakes.

However, the program still contained flaws. WindowBlinds 3 had many new features, but with new features came new bugs, including compatibility problems. Additionally, performance was suboptimal. Interim releases addressed these issues and provided for those areas of the Windows XP user interface that could not initially be skinned.

By the time WindowBlinds 4 arrived, there were fewer problems, due in part to an increased focus on stability for DirectSkin clients. In addition, SkinStudio now provided a method to import the Microsoft msstyles format.

WindowBlinds 4.6 was released in August 2005, with the addition of mouseover "translucent glow" effects for the titlebar buttons, push buttons and other controls. Windowblinds 4.6 has now been renamed "WindowBlinds Classic", and is meant for non-XP Windows versions, which cannot run the new Windowblinds 5.

WindowBlinds 5, released in November 2005, extends translucency through per pixel alpha blending to the entire window frame, including the borders and taskbar.

WindowBlinds 6, released end 2007, adds Windows Vista-like blur effects on XP (although Microsoft said that such per-pixel alpha blending with blur is impossible to work on XP), later also Windows Sidebar skinning and more additional features. The configuration GUI was redesigned to a completely horizontal look.

WindowBlinds 7, released in late 2009, added native support for Windows 7. Amongst its new features is the ability to "skin Aero" by using colors and textures. Other new features include a new user interface, and various tweaks.

WindowBlinds 8, released in June 2013, added native support for Windows 8 while officially dropping support for Windows XP and Vista. The most prominent change was to its user interface, streamlining its layout while portraying a more minimalistic, Metro-like feel. In addition, version 8 updated the bundled themes and refined the corresponding preview mode.

WindowBlinds 10, released in March 2016, added native support for Windows 10 and some minor new features.

Windowblinds 11, released in November 2022, updated the UI to fit the design language of Windows 11, added a Windows 9x styled theme to the collection of default themes and improved support for dark mode and HDR.

== Competitors ==
WindowBlinds has had many competitors over the years. Initially, it was not clear which skinning program would be the most popular, and there was active competition between the programs from 1999 to early 2001. Most are still around, but they have generally faded in popularity, since WindowBlinds can alter more GUI elements. Examples of these competitors are eFX, Illumination, Chroma and CustomEyes and ShellWM.

== Skin design ==
The popularity of various designs has changed along with the skinning community. Initially, remakes (or "ports") of older operating systems like BeOS and AmigaOS were very popular. Users then began to explore the potential of such features as freeform skinning, titlebar animation, and scripting, resulting in a number of unique skins.

SkinStudio is a popular software tool by Stardock used to create skins for WindowBlinds, as well as programs such as ObjectBar, WebBlinds, PocketBlinds, Koala Player and Windows Media Player. It is a component of Object Desktop, but is also sold separately, and a version is available as a free download. SkinStudio uses a Universal Skin Format (USF) that can be used to create one skin and export it to multiple skin formats. In practice, skins often need further editing after being created from this template, but it can be of use when developing a suite of skins. msstyle files are imported into USF before being converted to one of the WindowBlinds skin formats.

== Legal actions ==
When Mac OS X was announced, its Aqua visual style was the subject of numerous ports, some of a high quality. This undermined Apple's marketing and they felt it infringed on their look and feel. Several skins were taken down at the company's request, notably the skin "WinAqua" by Dangeruss. Similarly, the run-up to the release of Windows XP resulted in many Luna skins. Skins with "XP" in the title were very popular that year. Prior to the release of Windows Vista, numerous skins were created that replicated Vista's GUI. Microsoft has sent a cease and desist letter to the creator of at least one of these themes.
