= Rainlendar =

Calendar program

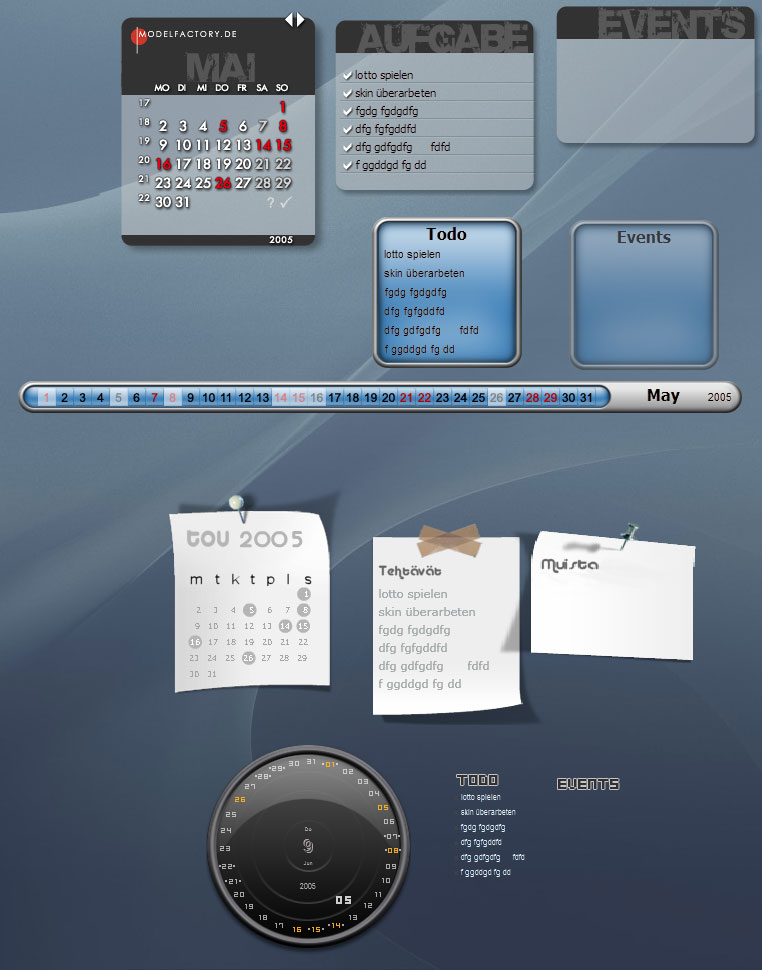
- One of Rainlendar's strengths is its wide variety of skins
- Developer: Kimmo Pekkola aka "Rainy"
- Release: 2000; 26 years ago
- Stable release: 2.24.1 / May 22, 2026; 32 days ago
- Operating system: Mac OS X, Windows and Linux
- Type: Calendar software
- License: Shareware
- Website: rainlendar.net

Rainlendar is a calendar program for Windows, Mac OS X and Linux. Versions prior to version 2 are licensed under the GNU GPL as free software, but subsequent versions are proprietary shareware with the paid version costing 9.95 euros.

== Features ==
Rainlendar has small space and memory requirements and a customizable user-interface (using skins). The calendar can be placed on the desktop and can be managed using the Windows notification area. It has common functions such as task list and a reminder alarm. Different event types can be represented with different symbols. Calendars can also be imported or synchronized using common file formats such as Outlook, iCal, and iCalendar files (using a plugin).

In addition to the stand-alone calendar program, Rainlendar-server is available for Windows and Linux, which can synchronize distributed Rainlendar applications. The program can also be used as a LiteStep plugin.

Rainlendar supports 60 languages as of 2016.

== See also ==
- Korganizer
- Lightning
