= Impulse (software) =

Defunct video game distribution platform (2008-14)

- Games displayed on the Impulse client's storefront
- Developer: GameStop
- Release: June 17, 2008; 18 years ago
- Stable release: 4.04.825 (August 2, 2012) [±]
- Operating system: Microsoft Windows
- Type: Content delivery
- License: Proprietary (Freeware)
- Website: www.impulsedriven.com

Impulse was a digital distribution and multiplayer platform. Originally developed by Stardock to succeed Stardock Central, it was purchased by GameStop in March 2011, and was subsequently rebranded as GameStop PC Downloads, with the client being renamed GameStop App. The client was discontinued in April 2014.

Impulse facilitated the purchase, download and updating of software. The platform also provided blogging, friends-list, chat, game matchmaking, achievements and ranking to certain games.

== Features ==
Impulse helped users purchase and download software. Purchases were tied to an account on GameStop's servers, and could be downloaded from anywhere that allowed the use of the Impulse client.

=== Storefront ===
Impulse provided a storefront that supports localized currencies, territory restrictions and a process for refunds. Publishers and developers that once used the Impulse storefront include Activision, Atari, Ubisoft, Epic Games, THQ, AVG, Iolo Technologies, Gas Powered Games, Hothead Games, Ironclad Games, Popcap Games, and Meridian4.

=== Software management ===
Impulse screenshot showing list of installed software

Impulse allowed users to install, update (when desired) and uninstall the software tied to a user's account. Users who purchased Impulse-supported games at retail stores could download the client and install previously purchased software on their computers without the original disc after registration of the game.

Impulse was able to create archives of purchased software to be stored on a backup medium, allowing users to revert to an older version if the latest version is not up to expectations.

=== Impulse::Reactor ===
Game developers could make API calls and query information from the Impulse community infrastructure using Impulse::Reactor, a software library which provides DRM/copy protection, achievements, accounts, friends lists, chat, multiplayer lobbies, and cloud storage.

== Criticism ==
=== Exclusive patches ===
Impulse, used for delivering patches, was criticised for causing the decline in availability of standalone patches. While it provided convenient and smaller updates for internet-connected users, users without availability of internet access face no other option to update their game via standalone patches. The only other way to update a game was to install Impulse on another connected computer, get an updated copy of the software or game before transferring it to an archive medium where it can be restored to the unconnected computer. However, the process was not feasible for people with limited access on public or corporate computers. The availability of these patches in the event that the company goes out of business is uncertain.

=== Resale limitations ===
Impulse did not support the resale of games. The product was transferable only when a user bought a second copy for another person, via the support system.

Re-sales were possible with Game Object Obfuscation, or GOO for short. GOO is GameStop's client-free DRM solution which allows neutrality between competing digital stores.

=== Fences 0.99 controversy ===
Stardock attracted criticism in September 2009 when its desktop organizer Fences 0.99 was bundled with Impulse (requiring Internet Explorer 7 and Microsoft .NET) without notification on the product description or download page. Fences had previously been available as a stand-alone product. Stardock later informed customers of the additional software requirements on the Fences website.

== History ==
Impulse was launched on June 17, 2008 as a successor to Stardock Central (launched in 2001). While Steam is the largest and most well-known digital distribution platform since its launch in 2002, it was only in 2004 that ecommerce was added.

In March 2011, GameStop announced their intent to purchase Impulse, as well as Spawn Labs. GameStop president Tony Bartel said these acquisitions would "provide a customer-friendly and publisher-friendly way" to deliver "gaming in many locations and on many devices." The purchase was completed on May 2, 2011.

As of April 24, 2014, GameStop officially discontinued the Impulse Client and web store. The Impulse Client was replaced by the GameStop PC Downloads App, which allows users to download content purchased prior to the discontinuation of Impulse. New digital PC game purchases are made through the GameStop.com store.

Support for legacy Impulse/GameStop App game downloads was handled for some time through Game Stop Guest Care. However, as of Feb 2019, no support content related to Impulse, the GameStop App, the PC platform is available through this portal. The term "GameStop App" now refers to an unrelated phone app.

GameStop currently does not provide any way to download games purchased through Impulse or the GameStop (PC) App.

== See also ==
- List of Impulse Reactor and Goo games
