= Stardock =

Software and video game developer

Stardock Corporation
- Type: Private
- Industry: Computer software
- Founded: Livonia, Michigan (1991)
- Headquarters: Plymouth, Michigan, United States (June 18, 2005)
- Key people: Brad Wardell (CEO)
- Revenue: $15 million (2009)
- Number of employees: 50+ (May 2012)

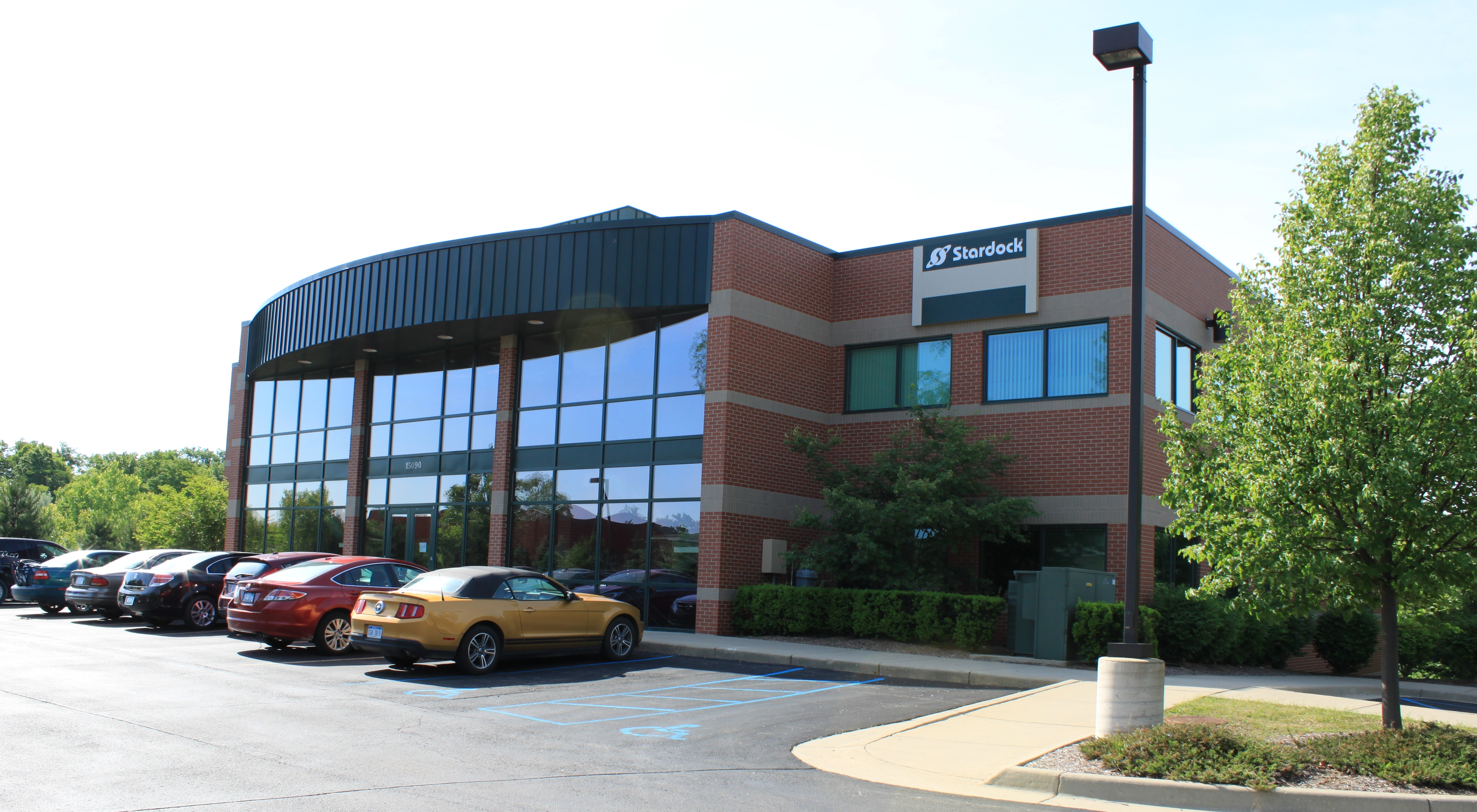
Stardock headquarters building

Stardock Corporation is an American software development company founded in 1991 and incorporated in 1993 as Stardock Systems. Stardock initially developed for the OS/2 platform, but transitioned to Microsoft Windows with the collapse of the OS/2 ecosystem between 1997 and 1998. The company is best known for software that allow a user to modify or extend a graphical user interface as well as PC games, particularly strategy games such as the Galactic Civilizations series.

Stardock created and maintains WinCustomize, a graphical user interface customization community, and developed the Impulse digital distribution system before its sale to GameStop and its 2014 discontinuation. It offers skins and themes for software that is part of its Object Desktop desktop suite. The company is headquartered in Plymouth, Michigan.

== History ==
Stardock was founded by college student Brad Wardell and named after a major city in Raymond E. Feist's Riftwar Cycle. Wardell serves as the company's president and chief executive. Stardock was a PC building company at inception and later expanded into software development.

=== OS/2 era (1993–2001) ===
Stardock's initial product was a computer game for OS/2 called Galactic Civilizations. Stardock did not receive the majority of royalties from the initial sales of Galactic Civilizations due to publisher bankruptcy in addition to taking on many of the publisher's responsibilities, but the market had been created for subsequent addon packs including the Shipyards expansion, and Stardock later sold a significant number of licenses to IBM for part of its Family FunPak (under the name Star Emperor). Stardock went on to create OS/2 Essentials, and its successor, Object Desktop, which provided the company with a large base of users.

Wardell identified the death of the OS/2 platform as a major setback for the company. Stardock continued to develop applications software and games for OS/2, at the same time that IBM had internally cancelled its development. Stardock's OS/2 offerings at the time included Avarice and Entrepreneur. With the launch of Windows NT 4, Stardock found that its user base was deteriorating. The company was reoriented as a Microsoft Windows developer, losing many of its financial resources and staff in the transition. Stardock had expected Trials of Battle, a 3D hovercraft fighting game, to sell a million copies and it instead sold hundreds.

=== Windows era (1998–present) ===
The newer, smaller Stardock was heavily reliant on the goodwill of its previous customers, who essentially purchased Windows subscriptions for Object Desktop in anticipation of the products it would consist of. Having put together a basic package (including some old favorites from the OS/2 era) Stardock began to bring in external developers to create original products.

Stardock's first major Windows success was with WindowBlinds, an application originated by a partnership with developer Neil Banfield. There turned out to be a large market for skinnable products, and Stardock prospered, growing significantly in the following five years. The release of Windows XP stimulated sales in Stardock products, and despite growing competition proportional to the market the company remains in a strong position.

In 2001, it added a widget creation and desktop modification tool, DesktopX, based on Alberto Riccio's VDE. DesktopX competed with Konfabulator and Kapsules in the widget arena. In 2003, Stardock became a Microsoft Gold Certified Partner with its "Designed for Windows" certification of WindowBlinds.

Stardock's success in the Windows game market has been mixed. At first, its titles on Windows were published by third parties: The Corporate Machine (Take 2), Galactic Civilizations (Strategy First), and The Political Machine (Ubisoft). While all three titles sold well at retail, Stardock was unsatisfied with the amount of revenue Windows games developers received. In the case of Galactic Civilizations, publisher Strategy First filed for bankruptcy without paying most of the royalties owed. This ultimately led to Stardock self-publishing its future titles. Because of the success of its desktop applications, Stardock has been able to self-fund its own PC games and aid third-party developers with their games as well. In 2010 Q3, Stardock engaged in layoffs.

In 2012, Stardock successfully launched Sins of a Solar Empire: Rebellion to positive reviews. This version was co-developed by Stardock and development partner Ironclad Games.

In July 2013, Stardock bought the Star Control franchise during the Atari, SA bankruptcy proceedings. This resulted in the 2018 release of Star Control Origins, which received mixed reviews. During development, there were ongoing legal disputes with the original creators of the Star Control franchise.

== Desktop enhancements and utilities ==
Stardock's Object Desktop is a set of PC desktop enhancement utilities designed to enable users to control the way their operating system looks, feels and functions. Originally developed for OS/2, the company released a version of it for Windows in 1999. Components of Object Desktop include WindowBlinds, IconPackager, DeskScapes, DesktopX, Fences and WindowFX, as well as utilities such as Multiplicity and SpaceMonger designed to increase productivity and stability on Windows.

Stardock also sells ObjectDock, which provides similar functionality to the dock found in Mac OS X, but with additional capabilities.

In 2012, Stardock added Start8 to Object Desktop, which adds a Start button and Start menu to Windows 8, whose lack of a traditional Start menu in favor of a Start screen received polarizing reception. A similar program, Start10, was created in 2015 to add a Start menu to Windows 10 that looks similar to Windows 7's Start Menu. Start10 was then followed by Start11, which aims to bring back Start menu and task bar functionality removed in Windows 11.

=== WinCustomize ===
Stardock owns and operates a number of websites, the most popular of which is WinCustomize. WinCustomize is best known for providing a library of downloadable content, such as skins, themes, icons and wallpapers for the Microsoft Windows operating systems.

== Ludography ==
Stardock began operating as a game developer with its first title, Galactic Civilizations for the OS/2 platform in 1994. Stardock also published Stellar Frontier in 1995, a multiplayer space strategy/shooter game made by Doug Hendrix.

Stardock found success developing online software subscription services such as Object Desktop for the PC, which allowed it to slowly grow a separate game division. After the release of The Corporate Machine and Lightweight Ninja, Stardock remade Galactic Civilizations for the PC. A successful sequel was self-published by Stardock, allowing it to grow its publishing business for third-party games, including titles such as Sins of a Solar Empire, Demigod, and Ashes of the Singularity.

List of Stardock game titles
Game title	Developer	Publisher	Release date
Galactic Civilizations (OS/2)	Stardock	Advanced Idea Machines	Fall 1994
Stellar Frontier	Doug Hendrix	Stardock	1995
StarCraft: Retribution	Stardock	WizardWorks	1998
The Corporate Machine	Stardock	Take-Two Interactive	July 14, 2001
Lightweight Ninja	Stardock	Black Tooth	August 6, 2001
Galactic Civilizations (PC)	Stardock	Strategy First	March 26, 2003
The Political Machine	Stardock	Ubisoft	August 12, 2004
Galactic Civilizations II	Stardock	Stardock	February 21, 2006
Sins of a Solar Empire	Ironclad Games	Stardock	February 4, 2008
The Political Machine 2008	Stardock	Ubisoft	June 24, 2008
Demigod	Gas Powered Games	Stardock	April 14, 2009
Elemental: War of Magic	Stardock	Stardock	August 24, 2010
The Political Machine 2012	Stardock	Stardock	July 31, 2012
Elemental: Fallen Enchantress	Stardock	Stardock	October 23, 2012
Dead Man's Draw	Stardock	Stardock	February 6, 2014
Galactic Civilizations III	Stardock	Stardock	May 14, 2015
Sorcerer King	Stardock	Stardock	June 16, 2015
The Political Machine 2016	Stardock	Stardock	February 4, 2016
Ashes of the Singularity	Oxide Games	Stardock	March 31, 2016
Offworld Trading Company	Mohawk Games	Stardock	April 28, 2016
Sorcerer King: Rivals	Stardock	Stardock	September 22, 2016
Star Control: Origins	Stardock	Stardock	September 20, 2018
Siege of Centauri	Stardock	Stardock	September 12, 2019
The Political Machine 2020	Stardock	Stardock	March 3, 2020
Galactic Civilizations IV	Stardock	Stardock	April 26, 2022
Sins of a Solar Empire II	Ironclad Games	Stardock	October 27, 2022 (early access)
The Political Machine 2024	Stardock	Stardock	February, 2024
Elemental: Reforged (remaster of Elemental: War of Magic)	Stardock	Stardock	March 17, 2026

== Digital distribution ==
Having developed Stardock Central to digitally distribute its own PC titles, the company launched a service called Drengin.net in summer 2003. It was originally planned for users to pay an annual subscription fee to receive new titles as they became available. Initially, Stardock's own titles published by Strategy First were available. A year later, Stardock replaced the subscription model with a new system called TotalGaming.net in which users could purchase games individually or pay an upfront fee for tokens which allowed them to purchase games at a discount. TotalGaming.net targeted independent game developers rather than the larger publishers. In late 2008, new token purchases were discontinued.

In 2008, Stardock announced its third-generation digital distribution platform, Impulse. Stardock's intention was for Impulse to include independent third-party games and major publisher titles and indeed, the service now includes content from a variety of publishers. The platform was sold to GameStop in May 2011.

After the sale of Impulse, Stardock games have been published on other distribution platforms such as Steam.

=== ThinkDesk ===
ThinkDesk was a productivity application subscription service, launched by Stardock on 14 April 2005 as a utility counterpart to its Object Desktop and TotalGaming.net services. Subscriptions were for one year, after which users could choose to renew or keep the software that they have, including all released upgrades to that date. The service never came out of beta and was discontinued in March 2009.

ThinkDesk components were typically downloaded using Impulse, although if purchased separately they could also be downloaded as executable installers. They included:

- Multiplicity, which allows the control of multiple PCs with a single keyboard and mouse, in a similar manner to a KVM switch
- KeepSafe, which automatically kept file revisions for selected directories and file types
- ThinkSync, which synchronized files and folders between hard drives or across the Internet
- SecureProcess, which allowed only processes defined as safe to run; an anti-virus/anti-spyware component

== Litigation ==
Stardock has been involved in litigation in relation to its business:

- In 1998, it was sued by Entrepreneur magazine for use of the trademark name "Entrepreneur" for one of its games. Stardock claimed that its use of this word was not related to the magazine's business, but did not have the money to fight the case—the name was changed to Business Tycoon; a later version was rebranded as The Corporate Machine.
- In December 2003, TGTSoft sued Stardock and Brad Wardell for declarative relief, claiming that it should be able to use the IconPackager .iptheme file format without charge. Many open source programs do read and write proprietary file formats without paying royalties—for example, OpenOffice.org reads and writes Word, Excel, PowerPoint and other Microsoft Office files. However, Stardock maintained that it should be entitled to royalties or a license fee on such software, particularly as TGTSoft was charging money for its products and because it was considered likely that its users would use the WinCustomize libraries, which are run with help (monetary and otherwise) from Stardock. The case was eventually settled out of court, with TGTSoft licensing the format for use with its products.
- In 2018, Stardock sued Paul Reiche and Fred Ford in Stardock Systems, Inc. v. Reiche, for trademark infringement. Reiche and Ford countersued for copyright infringement from Stardock continuing to sell Star Control I and II on Steam and GOG. Litigation ended in June 2019 when both sides reached a settlement in which Reiche and Ford agreed not use Star Control in relation to new titles and Stardock agreeing not to use an enumerated list of alien names from Star Control 1 and 2 in future games. It has been reported that negotiating took place without the involvement of legal intermediaries.
