= Index of Windows games (G) =

This is an index of Microsoft Windows games.

This list has been split into multiple pages. Please use the Table of Contents to browse it.

Title	Released	Developer	Publisher
G String	2020	Eyaura	Eyaura
G-Darius	2000	Taito	CyberFront Corporation, MediaKite, Sourcenext
G-Force	2009	Eurocom	Disney Interactive Studios
G-Nome	1997	7th Level	7th Level
G-Police	1997	Psygnosis	Psygnosis
G.I. Joe: The Rise of Cobra	2009	Double Helix Games	Electronic Arts
Gabriel Knight 3: Blood of the Sacred, Blood of the Damned	1999	Sierra On-Line	Sierra On-Line
Gabriel Knight: Sins of the Fathers	1993	Sierra On-Line	Sierra On-Line
Gadget Trial	2006	KOGADO Studio	KOGADO Studio
Gadget – Invention, Travel, & Adventure	1994	Synergy, Inc.	Synergy Interactive
Galactic Assault: Prisoner of Power	2007	Paradox Interactive	Wargaming.net
Galactic Civilizations	2003	Stardock	Strategy First
Galactic Civilizations II: Dark Avatar	2007	Stardock	Stardock
Galactic Civilizations II: Dread Lords	2006	Stardock	Stardock
Galactic Civilizations II: Twilight of the Arnor	2008	Stardock	Stardock
Galactic Civilizations III	2015	Stardock	Stardock
Galactic Civilizations IV	2022	Stardock	Stardock
Galacticare	2024	Brightrock Games	Cult Games
Galaga: Destination Earth	2000	King of the Jungle Ltd.	Hasbro Interactive
Game of Thrones: War for Westeros	2026	PlaySide	PlaySide
Game Tycoon	2006	Tri Synergy	Tri Synergy
Gang Beasts	2014	Boneloaf	Boneloaf
Gang Garrison 2	2008	Faucet Software	Faucet Software
Garage	1999	Kinotrope	Toshiba-EMI
Garfield: A Tail of Two Kitties	2006	Two Tribes B.V.	The Game Factory
Garfield: Caught in the Act	1996	Point of View, Inc.	Sega
Garry's Mod	2005	Facepunch Studios	Valve
Gary Grigsby's War in the East	2010	2 by 3 Games	Matrix Games
Gateway	1995	Legend Entertainment	Legend Entertainment
Gearhead Garage	1999	Mekada	Activision
Gears 5	2019	The Coalition	Xbox Game Studios
Gears of War	2007	Epic Games	Microsoft Game Studios
Gears of War 4	2016	The Coalition	Microsoft Studios
Gears of War: Ultimate Edition	2016	The Coalition	Microsoft Studios
Gears Pop!	2019	Mediatonic	Xbox Game Studios
Gears Tactics	2019	Splash Damage	Xbox Game Studios
Gekkeiju Online	2003	Coolhouse Productions	Coolhouse Productions
Gemsweeper	2007	Lobstersoft	Lobstersoft
Geneforge	2001	Spiderweb Software	Spiderweb Software
Geneforge 2	2003	Spiderweb Software	Spiderweb Software
Geneforge 3	2005	Spiderweb Software	Spiderweb Software
Geneforge 4: Rebellion	2006	Spiderweb Software	Spiderweb Software
Geneforge 5: Overthrow	2008	Spiderweb Software	Spiderweb Software
GeneRally	2002	Hannu and Jukka Räbinä	Hannu and Jukka Räbinä
Genesis Rising: The Universal Crusade	2007	Metamorf Studios	DreamCatcher Interactive
Genesys	2000	Cybele Productions, Wanadoo Edition	Cybele Productions, Wanadoo Edition
Genewars	1996	Bullfrog Productions	Electronic Arts
Genital Jousting	2018	Free Lives	Devolver Digital
Geometry Wars	2003	Bizarre Creations	Microsoft Game Studios
Get Even	2017	The Farm 51	Bandai Namco Entertainment
Get Medieval	1998	Monolith Productions	Monolith Productions
Gex	1996	Crystal Dynamics	BMG Interactive
Gex 3: Deep Cover Gecko	1999	Crystal Dynamics	Crave Entertainment
Gex: Enter the Gecko	1998	Crystal Dynamics	Eidos Interactive
Ghajini – The Game	2009	Fx Labs	Fx Labs
Ghost Master	2003	Sick Puppies	Empire Interactive, Feral Interactive
Ghost of a Tale	2015	SeithCG	SeithCG
Ghostbusters: The Video Game	2009	Terminal Reality, Threewave Software	Atari
Ghostrunner	2020	One More Level, Slipgate Ironworks	505 Games, All in! Games
Ghostrunner 2	2023	One More Level	505 Games
Ghostwire: Tokyo	2022	Tango Gameworks	Bethesda Softworks
Giants: Citizen Kabuto	2000	Planet Moon Studios	Interplay Entertainment
Gibbage	2006	Dan Marshall	
Gish	2004	Cryptic Sea	Chronic Logic, Valve, Stardock
Gizmos & Gadgets!	1997	The Learning Company	The Learning Company
Gladiator: Sword of Vengeance	2003	Acclaim Studios Manchester	Acclaim Entertainment
The Gladiators: Galactic Circus Games	2002	Eugen Systems	Arxel Tribe, Tri Synergy
Glest	2004	Glest Team	
Global Conflicts: Latin America	2008	Serious Games Interactive	Gamers Gate, Manifesto Games, Macgamestore
Global Conflicts: Palestine	2007	Serious Games Interactive	Gamers Gate, Manifesto Games, Macgamestore
Global Operations	2002	Barking Dog Studios	Crave Entertainment
Globetrotter	2000	Deadline Games	Vision Park
Globetrotter 2	2001	Deadline Games	Vision Park
Globulation 2	2009	Globulation 2 Team	Globulation 2 Team
Glory of the Roman Empire	2006	Haemimont Games	CDV Software, FX Interactive
Glove on Fight	2002	Watanabe Seisakujo	Watanabe Seisakujo
Glover	1998	Interactive Studios	Hasbro Interactive
GNU Chess	1984	GNU Project	
Go! Go! Nippon!	2011	Overdrive	MangaGamer
Gobliiins 4	2009	Société Pollene	Kalypso Media UK Ltd
God Eater 3	2019	Bandai Namco	Bandai Namco
Godfall	2020	Counterplay Games	Gearbox Publishing
The Godfather II	2009	EA Redwood Shores	Electronic Arts
Godfather: The Game	2006	Electronic Arts	Electronic Arts
Gods and Generals	2003	Anivision	Activision Value
Gold and Glory: The Road to El Dorado	2000	Revolution Software	Ubi Soft
The Golden Compass	2007	Shiny Entertainment	Sega
GoldenEye: Source	2010	Team Goldeneye: Source	
Golf Resort Tycoon	2001	Cat Daddy Games	Activision
Goofy Golf Deluxe	1999	Squeegee Software	Squeegee Software
Gore: Ultimate Soldier	2002	4D Rulers	DreamCatcher Games
Gothic	2001	Piranha Bytes	Egmont Interactive
Gothic 3: Forsaken Gods	2008	Trine Games	JoWooD Productions
Gothic II	2002	Piranha Bytes	JoWood
Gothic II: Night of the Raven	2003	Piranha Bytes	JoWood, Aspyr
GP 500	1999	Melbourne House	MicroProse
GP Challenge	2002	Midas Interactive Entertainment	Midas Interactive Entertainment
Granado Espada	2006	IMC Games Co., Ltd.	IMC Games Co., Ltd.
Grand Ages: Rome	2009	Haemimont Games	Kalypso Media
Grand Prix 3	2000	MicroProse	Hasbro Interactive
Grand Prix 4	2002	MicroProse	Infogrames
Grand Prix Legends	1998	Papyrus Design Group	Sierra Entertainment
Grand Prix Manager 2	1996	Edward Grabowski Communications Ltd	Microprose
Grand Theft Auto	1997	DMA Design	BMG Interactive, ASC Games
Grand Theft Auto 2	1999	DMA Design	Rockstar Games
Grand Theft Auto III	2001	DMA Design	Rockstar Games
Grand Theft Auto IV	2008	Rockstar North	Rockstar Games
Grand Theft Auto V	2015	Rockstar North	Rockstar Games
Grand Theft Auto: London 1969	1999	Rockstar Canada	ASC Games
Grand Theft Auto: San Andreas	2004	Rockstar North	Rockstar Games
Grand Theft Auto: Vice City	2002	Rockstar North	Rockstar Games
Grandia II	2000	Game Arts	Ubi Soft
Grandmaster Championship Chess	1995	IntraCorp	Capstone Software
Granny's Garden	2006	4Mation	4Mation
Gratuitous Space Battles	2009	Positech Games	Positech Games
Graven	2024	Slipgate Ironworks	3D Realms, Fulqrum Publishing
Gray Dawn	2018	Interactive Stone	Interactive Stone
The Great Escape	2003	Pivotal Games	SCi Games
The Great War: Western Front	2023	Petroglyph Games	Frontier Foundry
GreedFall	2019	Spiders	Focus Home Interactive
Green Hell	2019	Creepy Jar	
Gregory and the Hot Air Balloon	1996	Capitol Multimedia, Inc.	Broderbund
Grey Goo	2015	Petroglyph Games	Grey Box
Grid	2019	Codemasters	Codemasters
Grid 2	2013	Codemasters	Codemasters
Grid Autosport	2014	Codemasters	Codemasters
Grid Runner	1996	Radical Entertainment	Virgin Interactive
Gridrunner Revolution	2009	Llamasoft	Llamasoft
Gridrunner++	2002	Llamasoft	Llamasoft
Grim Dawn	2016	Crate Entertainment	Crate Entertainment
Grim Fandango	1998	LucasArts	LucasArts
Grom: Terror in Tibet	2002	Rebelmind	CDV Software
Ground Control	2000	Massive Entertainment	Sierra On-Line
Ground Control II: Operation Exodus	2004	Massive Entertainment	Vivendi Universal
Ground Control: Dark Conspiracy	2000	Massive Entertainment	Sierra Studios
Grounded	2022	Obsidian Entertainment	Xbox Game Studios
Gruntz	1999	Monolith Productions	Monolith Productions
GT Legends	2005	Simbin	Atari
GT Racers	2004	Aqua Pacific	Oxygen Interactive
GTR – FIA GT Racing Game	2005	SimBin	Atari
GTR 2 – FIA GT Racing Game	2006	Blimey! Games Ltd. (under license to SimBin)	Blimey! Games Ltd.
The Guild 2	2006	4HEAD Studios	JoWood Productions
Guild Wars 2	2012	ArenaNet	NCsoft
Guild Wars Factions	2006	ArenaNet	NCSoft
Guild Wars Nightfall	2006	ArenaNet	NCSoft
Guild Wars: Eye of the North	2007	ArenaNet	NCSoft
Guilty Gear Isuka	2005	Arc System Works	Sourcenext, Bitway, Zoo Digital Publishing
Guilty Gear X	2000	Arc System Works	CyberFront Corporation, I-DreamSoft
Guitar Hero III: Legends of Rock	2007	Aspyr Media	Activision
Guitar Hero: Aerosmith	2008	Neversoft	Activision
Guitar Praise	2008	Digital Praise	Digital Praise
Gulf War: Operation Desert Hammer	1999	3DO	3DO
Gun	2005	Neversoft, Beenox	Activision
Gun Metal	2002	Rage Software	Zoo Digital Publishing, Strategy First
The Gunk	2021	Thunderful Development	Thunderful Publishing
Gunlok	2000	Rebellion Developments	Virgin Interactive
Gunman Chronicles	2000	Rewolf Software	Sierra Studios
Gunship!	2000	MicroProse	Hasbro Interactive
Gurumin	2004	Nihon Falcom	Nihon Falcom, Mastiff, 505 Game Street
The Guy Game	2004	Topheavy Studios	Gathering of Developers
