= Entrepreneur (video game) =

1997 video game

- Developer: Stardock Systems
- Publisher: Stardock Systems
- Platforms: OS/2, Windows
- Release: 10 November 1997
- Genre: Business simulation

Entrepreneur is a 1997 business simulation video game by Stardock Systems. Upon release, the game received average reviews, with critics praising the game's strategy premise and challenge, and critiquing its learning curve and the limited depth of its economic simulation. A successor, The Corporate Machine, was released in 2000.

== Gameplay ==
Gameplay screenshot

Players assume the role of a CEO of a computer manufacturing company, and compete against up to eight other companies. The game is played on one of twelve maps divided into regions. Starting in one region, the objective of the game to obtain a monopoly of market share in all the regions on the map. Business is expanded by constructing and upgrading buildings that progress research, production, marketing, sales and recreational qualities of the product, and assigning staff to each. Research is required to develop new CPU, RAM and hard drive components for computers to improve the product against five attributes: reliability, ease of use, aesthetics, ease of use, and prestige. Demand for the product can be increased by adapting it to what attributes are preferred in a region, and undertaking marketing activities. Each company earns Direct Action Cards based on the resources they hold in their regions, which, when played, disadvantages their opponents.

== Development and release ==
Entrepreneur was developed by Stardock Systems, the development studio led by the game's chief designer and lead developer Brad Wardell. It was created by the development team of the studio's 1994 title Galactic Civilizations. Developed for OS/2, the game was ported to Microsoft Windows as its programmer, Mike Duffy, created a software library named Pear which allowed the studio to do so. Entrepreneur featured a development budget of over one million dollars. An Early Experience version of the game was distributed to pre-order subscribers.

Entrepreneur was released by Stardock on 10 October 1997. The game received free periodic updates over 1998, which included new features, markets and maps. It was also showcased by Stardock at E3 1998. Wardell made various estimates that the game sold around 35,000 to 75,000 units, although profits from 10,000 were not received by the developer due to the bankruptcy of two of its distributors. The company received an intellectual property lawsuit from Entrepreneur Magazine due to use of the term "Entrepreneur" in its title, which was settled out of court. In 2001, Stardock released a successor to Entrepreneur named The Corporate Machine, which updated and enhanced elements of the game.

=== Corporate Expansion Pack ===
At E3 in May 1998, Stardock announced the Corporate Expansion Pack for Entrepreneur, an expansion pack that introduces new content. Additions include maps of real-world locations such as Australia, Japan, and Singapore, new resources to trade such as aircraft, cars, footwear and cereal. In addition, the expansion alters gameplay mechanics and the production, research, marketing and sales of different product lines.

== Critical reception ==
Reception

Review scores
| Publication | Score |
|---|---|
| Computer Games Strategy Plus | 3.5/5 |
| Computer Gaming World | 3.5/5 |
| GameSpot | 6.3/10 |
| PC Games (US) | C- |
| Gamezilla | 76% |

Reviewers of Entrepreneur considered the corporate theme was novel for a strategy video game, with Computer Games Strategy Plus writing that the game was unique and provided a "lively and imaginative" representation to the world of business. Critics also praised the game for its humorous tone. Some critics viewed Entrepreneur featured a steep learning curve that required a long time for players to master. Computer Gaming World wrote that the game was "constantly challenging" due to the "merciless" nature of its AI.

Some critics viewed the management gameplay of Entrepreneur was lacking. Gamespot considered the premise of the game was strong, but the realism of the economic simulation was limited and players did not have enough feedback to respond to the performance of the market. PC Games faulted the game for having little to do, finding its management gameplay as uninvolved and tedious to play.
