= Brad Wardell =

American novelist

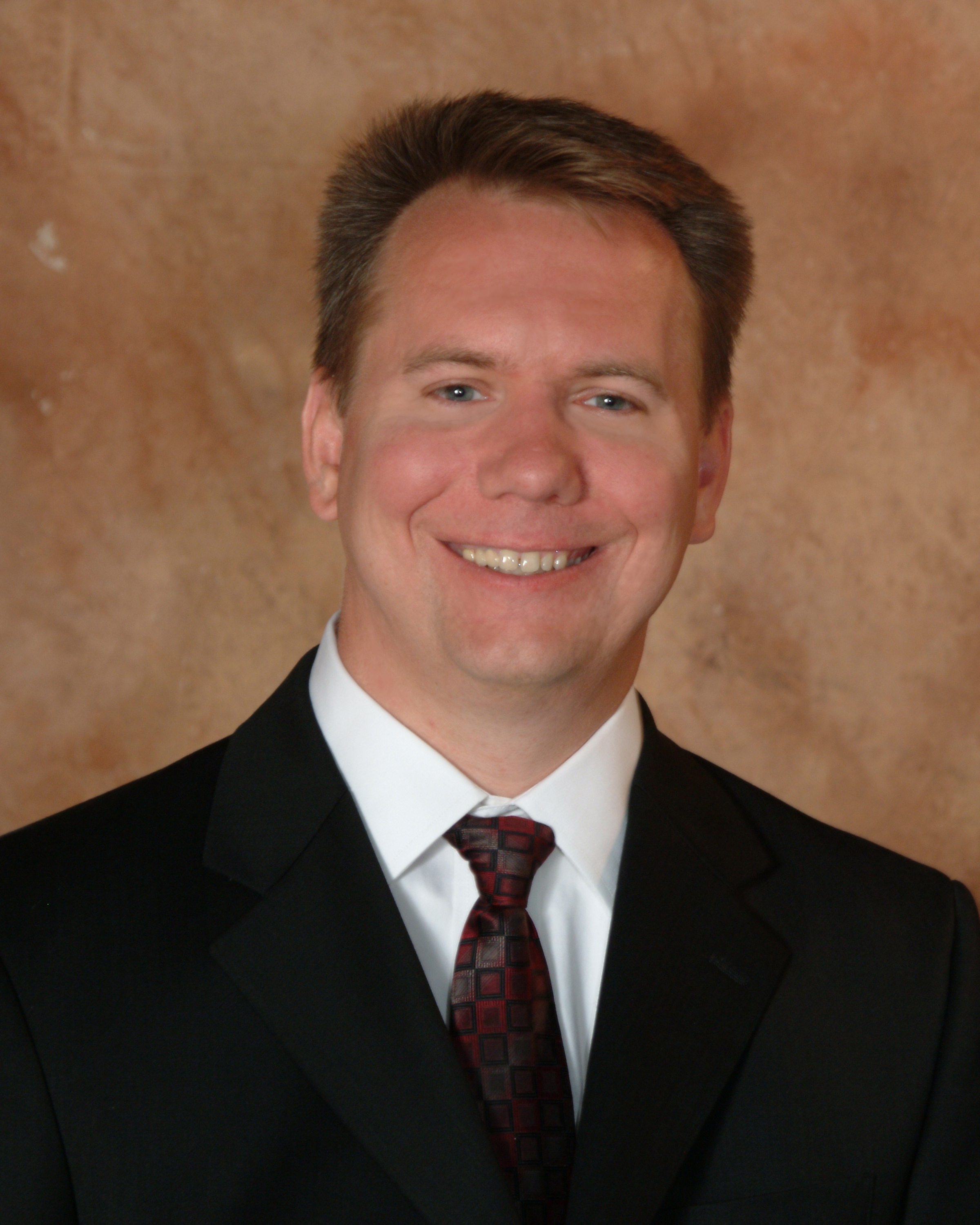
- Wardell in 2007
- Born: Bradley R. Wardell; June 24, 1971 (age 55); Texas
- Education: Western Michigan University
- Occupations: CEO, founder of Stardock Corporation
- Website: www.littletinyfrogs.com

Bradley R. Wardell (born June 24, 1971) is an American businessman, programmer, author and AI engineer. He is the founder, president, and CEO of Stardock, a software development and computer games company.

== Education ==
Wardell graduated from Western Michigan University in 1994 with a degree in Electronic Engineering, specializing in Computer Engineering.

== Career ==
Wardell was involved in the design and implementation of Galactic Civilizations for OS/2, one of the platform's few games. He led development of OS/2 Essentials, followed by Object Desktop, a package of utilities and desktop enhancements.

When the OS/2 market collapsed, he shifted Stardock to Windows, heading development of PC game Entrepreneur, while coordinating the creation of WindowBlinds and other Object Desktop components.

Wardell was an early pioneer of digital distribution of games and software, despite the potential for software piracy. Wardell was an early adopter of digital distribution culminating with the Impulse (software) sales platform. While recognizing copyright infringement as an issue, he felt that efforts to prevent it ended up making software more frustrating for legitimate customers. To this end, Wardell created a "Gamers Bill of Rights," released at PAX 2008. Gas Powered Games' Chris Taylor – who was working with Stardock on Demigod at the time – called the bill "an awesome framework for the industry to aspire to." Later, his digital distribution platform, Impulse, was sold to GameStop in 2011.

Wardell designed Galactic Civilizations for Windows and its sequel, which became GameSpy's Game of the Year. He subsequently designed The Political Machine and Elemental, as well as two expansions: (Dark Avatar and Twilight of the Arnor) to Galactic Civilizations II. In the mid 2000s, Wardell continued to focus on the development of artificial intelligence and game mechanics for turn-based strategy games.

In 2012, he was the producer of Elemental: Fallen Enchantress.

In 2013, Stardock announced that it had promoted Derek Paxton to succeed Wardell in the running of Stardock Entertainment in order for Wardell to have more time for other projects. These other projects included co-founding new game studios including Oxide Games and Mohawk Games with Soren Johnson. Wardell's goal was to encourage innovation and empower a new generation of 4X game developers. As part of this endeavor, Wardell founded the Stardock Staffing Company to allow developers and artists to work on projects between a coalition of game studios to provide better job security.

=== Computer customization ===
Wardell is co-founder and webmaster of WinCustomize, a site specializing in the distribution of skins and themes for computer software. Wardell was a designer of OS customization programs such as WindowBlinds, Fences (software), and Object Desktop. He was a regular on the PowerUser.TV podcast, run by WinCustomize and Neowin, and organized the GUI Olympics (later GUI Championships), a semi-annual skinning competition starting in 2002.

== Video games ==
Wardell has programmed, designed or executive produced a substantial number of video games and is regularly interviewed by game industry sites regarding his views on technology, game publishing and trends. His particular expertise has focused on parallel computing, AI, graphics APIs and strategy games. He has also presented at the Game Developer's Conference several times on topics ranging from code optimization to disasters in publishing.

Wardell takes an approach to game development allowing users to view and influence the process of making games. Wardell is credited with multiple game projects either as a game designer or as an executive producer. Wardell is also an advocate for consumer rights for software and game customers and published the Gamer's Bill of Rights.

=== Designer ===
- Galactic Civilizations for OS/2 (1994)
- Star Emperor (1996)
- Entrepreneur (1997)
- The Corporate Machine (2001)
- Galactic Civilizations(2003)
- The Political Machine (2004)
- Galactic Civilizations II (2006)
- Elemental: War of Magic (2010)
- Sorcerer King (2015)
- Ashes of the Singularity (2016)
- Galactic Civilizations III: Crusade (2017)

=== Executive Producer ===
- Havok (1995)
- Trials of Battle (1996)
- Avarice (1996)
- Stellar Frontier (1997)
- Links Golf for OS/2 (1998)
- Sins of a Solar Empire (2008)
- Demigod (2009)
- Sins of a Solar Empire: Rebellion (2011)
- Elemental: Fallen Enchantress (2012)
- Elemental: Fallen Enchantress - Legendary Heroes (2013)
- Galactic Civilizations III (2015)
- Star Control: Origins (2018)
- Galactic Civilizations IV (2022)
- Political Machine 2024 (2024)

=== Publications ===
Wardell wrote the fantasy novel Elemental: Destiny's Embers, published by Del Rey to accompany Elemental: War of Magic. The book is set a thousand years after the Cataclysm, after the time of the game itself, and involves the quest of a former messenger to save mankind from the Fallen. The book came with a coupon to download an exclusive campaign for the game.

== Reception ==
Wardell was a member of Crain's's 40 under 40 in 2003, and was a finalist for Ernst & Young's Michigan Entrepreneur of the Year in 2002 and 2007.

Wardell has endorsed several criticisms raised by the Gamergate campaign, stating that "anyone reading the gaming sites has seen the trend over the past few years of activist journalism creeping in". In response to Ashes of the Singularity receiving a 4/10 from GameSpot and 69 out of 100 on Metacritic, Wardell accused journalists of having "some bone to pick with #gamergate", insisting that they "don't take it out on my game's metacritic score". Political commentator Milo Yiannopoulos voiced his support for Wardell, accusing the media of unfair treatment towards Wardell that eventually led up to Gamergate.
