= List of OS/2 games =

This is a list of games for the OS/2 operating system.

== List ==
- Angband
- AVARICE: The Final Saga
- B.U.G.S
- Battle for Wesnoth
- Crown of Might
- Doom
- Entrepreneur
- Freeciv
- Galactic Civilizations
- Hopkins FBI
- Lemmings/Oh No! More Lemmings/Christmas Lemmings
- Links
- Master of Empire
- OS/2 Chess
- Rocks'n'Diamonds
- Semtex
- SimCity
- SimCity 2000
- Stellar Frontier
- Super Star Trek
- Trials of Battle
