= You Suck at Parking =

2022 video game

- Developer: Happy Volcano
- Publisher: Curve Digital Publishing
- Engine: Unity
- Platforms: Windows, Nintendo Switch, Xbox One, Xbox Series X|S
- Release: Windows, Xbox, PlayStation: WW: 14 September 2022; Switch; 19 September 2023
- Genre: Racing
- Modes: Single-player, Multiplayer

You Suck At Parking is a 2022 video game developed by Happy Volcano and published by Curve Digital Publishing. The game is an action racing title in which players control a car that must avoid obstacles to slide into a parking space over a series of levels. It also features a multiplayer mode for up to eight players. Upon release, the game received average reviews.

== Gameplay ==
Gameplay

You Suck at Parking is a racing based action game in which players control a small car that must decelerate and park in a position on the course, whilst avoiding obstacles. Players cannot reverse, have limited fuel, and have a time limit, requiring them to manoeuvre their car into position in a short timeframe. The game's single-player mode involves sequential completion of stages set across an overworld of islands, with new islands being unlocked as players complete a number of stages. You Suck At Parking also features a multiplayer mode, where up to 8 players compete to be the first car to park in the designated position on the course.

== Development and release ==
You Suck at Parking was developed by Happy Volcano, an independent games studio based in Belgium. CEO and lead developer Jeroen Janssen stated the studio began work on the game as an intended single-player title, and decided to follow feedback to add multiplayer components after pitching and receiving investor funding from Hiro Capital. Microsoft showcased the game as part of its ID@Xbox event in Autumn 2022. Both Microsoft and Sony announced the game's inclusion on its Xbox Game Pass and PlayStation Plus catalog respectively.

== Reception ==
Reception

Aggregate score
Aggregator	Score
Metacritic	74%

Review scores
Publication	Score
Electronic Gaming Monthly	3/5
Eurogamer	
Movies Games and Tech	8/10
TheGamer	3.5/5

You Suck at Parking received "mixed or average" reviews, according to review aggregator Metacritic. Describing the game as "silly" and "lighthearted" Rock Paper Shotgun found the game's crashes and explosions amusing, praising its multiplayer mode as "manic", "competitive", stating it "[evokes] that Micro Machines-esque playfulness while still feeling responsive under the thumbs". ShackNews similarly enjoyed the game's "sense of urgency" and "solid level design", considering that levels carried an appropriate difficulty and "natural path and progression".
