= Ghost of a Tale =

2016 video game

- Developer: SeithCG
- Publisher: SeithCG
- Director: Lionel "Seith" Gallat
- Designers: Lionel "Seith" Gallat; Paul Gardner
- Programmers: Lionel "Seith" Gallat; Cyrille Paulhiac
- Artists: Lionel "Seith" Gallat; Jerome Jacinto
- Writers: Paul Gardner; Lionel "Seith" Gallat (story)
- Composers: Jeremiah Pena; Containher; Mathieu Alvado (Note: Pena wrote the game's incidental music, and Containher the in-universe songs performed primarily by Tilo; Alvado wrote an additional 23 minutes of incidental music added as a free update to the PC version in October 2018, and which was featured in all other versions upon release.)
- Engine: Unity
- Platforms: Microsoft Windows; PlayStation 4; Xbox One; Nintendo Switch; Amazon Luna
- Release: Microsoft Windows; March 13, 2018; PlayStation 4, Xbox One; March 12, 2019; Nintendo Switch; October 8, 2020; Amazon Luna; October 20, 2020
- Genres: Action role-playing, stealth
- Mode: Single-player

Ghost of a Tale is an action role-playing stealth game developed primarily by game designer and DreamWorks and Universal Pictures veteran Lionel "Seith" Gallat. It was funded by a successful Indiegogo crowdfunding campaign which ran from April to May 2013, raising €48,700. An early version was released in 2016 on Windows PCs and the Xbox One as part of Microsoft's ID@Xbox indie developer program, with the full version being released on PC on March 13, 2018, with additional releases on the Xbox One, PlayStation 4, Nintendo Switch and Amazon Luna in 2019 and 2020.

A story-focused game, Ghost of a Tale is set in a medieval dark fantasy world populated by anthropomorphic animals. It takes place on a rat-controlled island-prison where player character Tilo, an imprisoned mouse minstrel, seeks to escape so that he may reunite with his wife. Players must explore the prison and its surroundings, sneaking past the guards and disguising themselves to avoid getting caught. The game received positive reviews, and a sequel has been in development since 2020.

== Gameplay ==
Ghost of a Tale's gameplay is centered around stealth. The player has no weapons, so the only reliable way to evade the guards is to take cover in one of the many hiding spots found across the map. The game can only be saved while inside a hiding spot.

Costumes are another important aspect of the game. By collecting all pieces of clothing in a certain set, the player can trick the other mice into thinking they are someone else. This allows players to traverse the prison more easily and complete quests that are otherwise inaccessible.

== Synopsis ==
Ghost of a Tale takes place in a medieval world inhabited by several species of anthropomorphic animals, many of which inhabit their own kingdom: the lore includes mice, rats, frogs, and magpies, and many others that are referenced but do not appear directly. The game is set centuries after the War of the Green Flame, a cataclysmic event that saw a ball of emerald fire of unknown origin sweep across the world, killing all who stood against it and raising their bodies into an ever-growing undead army that fought against the living. At the height of the conflict, the mouse kingdom revealed the weaknesses of other nations to the Green Flame in an attempt to earn its mercy, although most of their land was destroyed regardless. In the end, the rat army was successful in defeating the Green Flame, ending the War and taking over the territory of the mice, which became a species shunned for their treachery.

Centuries later Tilo, a mice travelling bard, has been thrown into rat-controlled prison named Duinlan Heights, but nicknamed "Dwindling Heights" as it is slowly sinking into the waters below it. He was captured after his wife and music companion Merra refused to sing for a powerful Rat Baron; over the course of the game, he learns the reasons for her refusing to perform and for being brought to perform in the first place, as she had joined a secret revolutionary group aiming to overthrow the current rulers.

Tilo must find a way to escape the island-prison so that he can find Merra; to do so, he explores the prison and uses disguises to pose as other individuals. Among the key characters he interacts with are Silas, a guard with a mysterious past, the rat blacksmith Rolo who offers him directions for money, the mice thieving siblings Fatale and Gusto, and the conceited rat Commander of Dwindling Heights.

== Development ==
Ghost of a Tale is mostly a one-man project by Lionel Gallat, a veteran DreamWorks and Universal Pictures animator and animation director who worked on films such as The Prince of Egypt, The Road to El Dorado and Shark Tale. He received occasional help from his friends on certain aspects of the development. Gallat began work on the game shortly after finishing production on the 2012 film The Lorax, and showed the first alpha footage in April 2013 after nearly a year of progress, which coincided with the launch of the game's Indiegogo campaign to raise funds to further development. By the end of the campaign in May, he managed to reach his goal of €45,000 after a one-week extension, earning a total of €48,700.

Gallat was inspired by films such as The Secret of NIMH, The Dark Crystal and Disney's Robin Hood as well as the Redwall book series and the fantasy drawings of Alan Lee, John Howe and Paul Bonner. Video games such as the Legend of Zelda series, Dark Souls and Ico also influenced the title, with Gallat stating that "I'm really trying to recapture the sense of wonder I felt as a kid when I discovered the games from the 80s and early 90s. But with an AAA quality (as far as I'm able) that's very much up-to-date."

Gallat originally began work on the game in CryEngine but found that engine too difficult to use and so switched the project to Unity. Although Ghost of a Tale was designed to be "primarily a PC title", Microsoft expressed interest in the project and invited the team to release the game on the Xbox One as part of their ID@Xbox program which allows independent developers to self-publish games on their system. A trailer for the game was shown at the 2014 Gamescom in Germany, along with a fully playable demo. Ghost of a Tale was originally expected to launch on Windows PCs and the Xbox One in 2016 before being delayed. An early access version was instead released on Steam in July 2016, with an Xbox Game Preview version was released for Xbox One in June 2017. As of June 2017, Gallat estimated that the game was 45 percent complete. In February 2018, he announced that the Windows version's final release date would be on March 13, 2018, with the Xbox One and PlayStation 4 versions planned for release by the end of the year. A free update adding 23 minutes of new original music by Mathieu Alvado was added in October 2018, with the new material to be featured in all future versions of the game.

== Reception ==
=== Reviews ===
Ghost of a Tale received generally favourable reviews according to review aggregator Metacritic, having a score of 75% based on 22 reviews.

Reception

Aggregate score
Aggregator	Score
Metacritic	(PC) 75/100 (PS4) 82/100 (XONE) 75/100

Review scores
Publication	Score
Destructoid	6.5/10
Eurogamer	Recommended
RPGamer	3/5

=== Awards ===
List of awards and nominations
Award	Category	Result	Ref.
Ping Awards 2018	Best Independent Game	Won	
Ping Awards 2018	Independent Game: Best Graphics	Won	

== Sequel ==
After the full release of Ghost of a Tale on PC, the team worked on updating the game and porting it onto other consoles, after which they started active development of a follow-up in 2020. They spent a full year creating a new tool to handle quests and dialogue in a way that would better fit the game they envisioned, after which they focused on the other aspects of development for two years.

Originally, the game was being developed on the Unity engine like its predecessor, although, according to Lionel "Seith" Gallat: "After a couple of years of steady work a picture started to paint itself and I just didn't like it: We were spending more time fighting the engine rather than actually creating gameplay systems and assets. I was getting more and more frustrated with the everyday limitations and hassle Unity put on our iterative process... Around that time Epic began to communicate about their new Unreal Engine 5. So I took a look at it (not having liked at all the earlier 4.x iterations) and it became clear to me this was a much better option for our game." As a result, the team had to effectively scratch most of their work of the previous two years and spend an additional year-and-a-half learning to use Unreal Engine 5 and recreating the assets they had made for Unity, although due to their new first-party tool they were able to preserve most of their work on quests and dialogue. In January 2025, Gallat stated: "I'm very glad to say today that it was all well worth the time, pain and money. We're now at a stage we would never have reached with the previous engine. Both in terms of visual quality and gameplay richness."
