= Ghajini (2008 film) =

2008 Indian film by A. R. Murugadoss

- Theatrical release poster
- Directed by: A R Murugadoss
- Screenplay by: A. R. Murugadoss; Aamir Khan
- Story by: A. R. Murugadoss
- Dialogues by: Piyush Mishra
- Based on: Ghajini (2005) by A. R. Murugadoss
- Produced by: Allu Aravind; Tagore B. Madhu; Madhu Mantena
- Starring: Aamir Khan; Asin; Jiah Khan; Pradeep Rawat
- Cinematography: Ravi K. Chandran
- Edited by: Anthony
- Music by: A. R. Rahman
- Production company: Geetha Arts
- Distributed by: Indian Films (India); BIG Pictures (International)
- Release date: 25 December 2008
- Running time: 185 minutes
- Country: India
- Language: Hindi
- Budget: ₹52 crore
- Box office: est. ₹194.58 crore

Ghajini (pronounced [ɡədʒniː]) is a 2008 Indian Hindi-language psychological action thriller film directed by A. R. Murugadoss (in his Hindi film debut) from a screenplay by Murugadoss and Aamir Khan. A remake of Murugadoss' 2005 Tamil film of the same name, it stars Khan, Asin, Jiah Khan and Pradeep Rawat. In the film, Sanjay Singhania (Khan) seeks violent revenge for an attack which killed his fiancée and caused his anterograde amnesia.

Initially titled as Kajri, the core plot of the film was inspired from Memento and Happy Go Lovely. The first half was inspired by the 1969 Hindi film Sajan and the 1983 Bengali film Pochhonder Khatire, and Khan and Murugadoss co-wrote the remake, with Khan suggesting changes to suit the taste of the Hindi cinema audience. Allu Aravind, Madhu Mantena and Tagore Madhu jointly acted as the producers, while the film was distributed by Geetha Arts. A. R. Rahman composed the soundtrack and musical score, while cinematography and editing were handled by Ravi K. Chandran and Anthony. The film marks Asin's Hindi film debut, reprising her role from the original film.

Ghajini was theatrically released on 25 December 2008, coinciding with Christmas, where it became the highest-grossing Indian film of the year and the first Bollywood film to cross the ₹100 crore mark domestically, creating the 100 Crore Club. Ghajini's paid preview collections were ₹ 2.7 crore. It went on to become the highest-grossing Indian film of all time until it was surpassed by 3 Idiots. Khan's character was featured in a 3D video game titled Ghajini – The Game, which is based on the film.

== Plot ==
Sunita, a medical student, is investigating the anterograde amnesia case of Sanjay Singhania, the chairman of Air Voice, an infamous telecommunications company. Sunita does her investigation against her professor's wishes as Sanjay is under criminal investigation. Sanjay, who loses his memory every 15 minutes, uses a system of photographs, notes, and tattoos on his body to recover his memory and remember his mission of avenging the murder of his fiancée Kalpana Shetty, who was killed by Ghajini Dharmatma, a kingpin and a notable socialite in Mumbai.

Inspector Arjun Yadav investigates a recent murder committed by Sanjay of one of Ghajini's men at his house. He tracks Sanjay to his apartment and knocks him unconscious. While searching his apartment, he finds a diary in his drawer and begins to read it. Arjun learns that Sanjay, a successful entrepreneur and second generation businessman, met Kalpana, a struggling model after planning to install an advertising billboard for his company above her apartment. When his agents approach Kalpana about it, her boss misinterprets it as a romantic advance and encourages her to accept it. Kalpana decides to pose as Sanjay's girlfriend, after seeing that the false story elevates her influence at work. After learning about the rumor from local tabloids, Sanjay angrily plans to confront Kalpana. On the drive to her workplace, Sanjay witnesses a young woman help a bunch of disabled school girls cross a ditch to enter a museum, and he is deeply moved by her kindness. When he finally arrives at the ad company, he discovers that this kind-hearted woman is Kalpana. Her cheerful personality and humor capture his attention, and he decides to keep his identity a secret. Posing as a struggling model named Sachin Chauhan, he spends time with Kalpana as an ordinary man, and the two fall deeply in love. The diary ends with Sanjay proposing to Kalpana on New Year's Eve, with him deciding to reveal his true identity if she accepts, but to walk away as Sachin if she doesn't.

In the present, Arjun tries to interrogate an unconscious Sanjay about the events after the first diary to no avail. After searching his drawers again, he finds a second diary. As soon as he starts reading it, Sanjay suddenly regains consciousness, breaks free of his holds in a fit of rage and viciously attacks Arjun, tying him up and locking him in a cupboard. He later tracks down Ghajini to Sunita's college function where Ghajini is the guest of honor as the CEO of GD Pharmaceuticals, a major donor of the college. Sanjay takes pictures of Ghajini as part of his plan to kill him. In a fit of memory loss, Sanjay mistakenly kills one of Ghajini's goons, and flees the scene when he realizes that he killed the wrong man. Ghajini is perplexed and fails to understand why this mysterious killer is targeting him. He decides to find and kill his enemies from two years ago one by one, but Sanjay is not among them.

Meanwhile, Sunita goes to meet Sanjay at his apartment after initially meeting him at her college. After realizing that the door is unlocked and there is no one in the apartment, she begins searching through Sanjay's belongings and finds photographs of the people he had murdered along with a photograph of Ghajini he took at the college function as well as the two diaries that Arjun found earlier. She also finds Arjun tied up and beaten, and learns of Sanjay's murder plot. Arjun warns her to get out of the apartment quickly, but Sanjay suddenly arrives and questions who they are. Arjun quickly makes a run out of the apartment and Sanjay begins to follow him with Sunita following the two men. Arjun is hit by a bus and killed instantly. Sunita makes her escape by distracting Sanjay into a fight with some local thugs in a mall.

Sunita visits Ghajini while he is contemplating about the mysterious killer, provides him with the photos of the men Sanjay had murdered along with his identity and informs him that Sanjay is coming after him. Back in her hostel, Sunita realizes that Sanjay has a photo of her which she had him take during their first meeting so that he could remember her. When Sunita calls Ghajini to recover the photo, she inadvertently speaks to Sanjay who had broken into Ghajini's house. Sanjay asks for her address, arrives at her dormitory and attacks her. Sunita traps him in the lift and the police arrests Sanjay, sedates him to keep him under control. As the police try to figure out about the identity of the man they have arrested, they decide to call the phone numbers tattooed on his body. One of the number is Ghajini's, who visits the police station and poses as Sanjay's friend learning about the circumstances of his capture. Shortly after, Sanjay's employees and doctor arrive at the police station and take him home. After they leave, Ghajini breaks into Sanjay's apartment with his men and decides to take advantage of his condition, destroying his pictures, notes and equipment and cover his tattoos so he doesn't remember anything about the past, instead of killing him as it would complicate matters with the police.

Back at her dormitory, a shaken Sunita remembers the diaries she took from Sanjay's apartment. She reads both diaries and learns about Sanjay's background and about Kalpana. In the second diary, Kalpana accepts the proposal on the condition that she will marry only after purchasing three Ambassador cars, as her father owned his own travel company as well as three Ambassador cars before he got scammed by his brother-in-law. Sanjay gifts Kalpana an apartment via his manager, making her think that she won it in a lucky draw. Meanwhile, Kalpana buys one Ambassador car after selling some jewelry she had saved for her marriage.

To celebrate "winning" the apartment, Kalpana imprints her and Sanjay's foot impressions on a cement pad to store it as a memoir of their first step in her new apartment. Still keeping up his facade, Sanjay lies to Kalpana that he has to urgently go to his village to see his ailing mother; he actually has to go on a business trip to UK for ten days. Moments before he departs for the UK, Kalpana calls him late at night, and gives him money for his mother's treatment, having sold the car she wanted so much. This grand, unexpected display of thoughtfulness and considerate altruism leaves Sanjay shocked and sober, cementing his love for Kalpana. The second diary ends at this point. Perplexed, Sunita sets out with her friend to find the remaining pieces of Sanjay and Kalpana's story.

After some research, Sunita eventually learns that Kalpana travelled to Goa by train for an ad shoot. In the train, with the help of some soldiers, she stumbled across and freed a group of girls from a sex and organ trafficking ring organized by ruthless thug Ghajini Dharmatma. The story of the rescue of the girls makes the news and triggers a nationwide hunt by the police who start to dismantle the operations. On the train ride back to Mumbai with the girls, Sanjay calls her to check up on her and she tells him about the experience. Relieved that she is fine, he admits that he admires her kindness and bravery. He lightly alludes to his secret without giving anything away but promises to reveal more when he comes back.

Back in Mumbai, Kalpana is informed by a female constable at the police hospital that two of the twenty five girls she has brought in for treatment went missing. Perplexed, Kalpana travels to the police hospital and confronts the guard about the two missing girls. As they are arguing, Ghajini arrives with his men and confesses to Kalpana about killing the missing girls because they named him to the police. Kalpana, accusing him of being part of the system which makes society unsafe for women, leaves in disgust. An enraged Ghajini plans to kill Kalpana. Later that night when Kalpana returns to her apartment, the same constable calls Kalpana and warns her that Ghajini has set out to kill her and his henchmen are hiding inside her apartment. She advises Kalpana not to go home but it's too late. Ghajini's goons look for her while she hid inside a cupboard. That same night, Sanjay arrives from London to meet her. He rings the door bell and knocks but leaves after getting no answer. A petrified Kalpana calls Sanjay but he has forgotten his phone in his car. When Sanjay discovers Kalpana's missed calls, he calls her back but the ringtone gives away her location to Ghajini's goons. As Sanjay rushes back to her apartment, he finds Kalpana stabbed by the goons. As he is tending to her, Ghajini arrives from behind and hits Sanjay in the head with an iron rod before killing Kalpana with the same rod in front of him. He then knocks Sanjay out with another shot to the head, which results in his brain injury.

Sunita, now aware of the shocking truth, locates Sanjay in a hospital and tells him about his past, reminding him of Kalpana's murder and giving him his diaries to read. He flies into a furious and heartbroken rage. He demands to speak to Ghajini and talks to him through Sunita's cellphone, telling him that he is coming for him. Sunita helps him track Ghajini to his company. However, they find that he is already leaving the premises. They tail his car to a slum area and Sanjay, after identifying Ghajini with the help of Sunita, immediately goes after him, killing his men who get in his way. Eventually, he finds Ghajini and begins to viciously attack him but he manages to escape. Sanjay has a memory loss fit while searching for Ghajini. Ghajini takes advantage of the situation and stabs Sanjay with an iron rod. He knocks Sunita unconscious and taunts Sanjay with the grisly tale of how he murdered Kalpana. As Ghajini is about to make Sanjay relive the experience by preparing to kill Sunita in the same way with an iron rod, Sanjay recovers the memory of Kalpana and fights back, with an anger fueled strength. He kills Ghajini with an iron rod, in the same way that he killed Kalpana, thus finally avenging her murder. He breaks down as Sunita consoles him.

Six months later, Sanjay returns to his office as chairman of Air Voice and is volunteering at an orphanage named after Kalpana. Sunita arrives at the orphanage and gifts him the cement pad with Sanjay and Kalpana's foot impressions when they first set foot in Kalpana's apartment. As Sanjay touches the footprints, he feels Kalpana beside him, finally being at peace, as the screen pans out to a fading sunset.

== Cast ==
- Aamir Khan as Sanjay Singhania / Sachin Chauhan
- Asin as Kalpana Shetty
- Jiah Khan as Sunita Kalantri
- Pradeep Rawat as Ghajini Dharmatma
- Riyaz Khan as Inspector Arjun Yadav (voiceover by Rajesh Khattar)
- Khalid Siddiqui as Pankaj Shroff, Sanjay's private assistant and an Air Voice manager
- Tinnu Anand as Satveer Kohli, Kalpana's boss
- Sai Tamhankar as Amrita Kashyap, Sunita's friend
- Supreeth Reddy as Ghajini's henchman
- Mahendra Ghule as Ghajini's henchman
- Vibha Chibber as Havaldar Vaijayanti
- Sunil Grover as Sampat, a model who is being trained as the fake Sanjay Singhania
- Rajendran as Ghajini's henchman (uncredited)
- Firdausi Jussawalla as Dr. Peston Wadia
- Sonal Sehgal as ad model

Cameo appearance

- Anjum Rajabali as Dr. Debkumar Mitra, Sunita's professor

== Production ==
=== Development ===
Post the massive success of Ghajini, Murugadoss expressed interest in remaking the film with Salman Khan, but Pradeep Rawat felt like Aamir Khan might gel with Murugadoss better. It was rumoured earlier that the film was titled Kajri. It is a remake of the Tamil film, Ghajini (2005). Aamir Khan, who had never before worked in a remake film in his career, was initially hesitant to do the film, but was convinced by Suriya, the original star of the Tamil Ghajini, who told him he was "the only one who could do justice to the character." Suriya was a fan of Khan, and had some involvement in the film's development, discussing minute details with Khan for two years during the film's development.

=== Casting ===
Priyanka Chopra was offered the role of Kalpana, but was later replaced by Asin, who reprised her role from the original Tamil film.

Khan was involved in the film's creative writing process, deciding what should remain from the original Tamil Ghajini and what changes should be made. Murugadoss revealed that the altered climax of the film was rewritten by Khan. According to Murugadoss:

We didn't make too many changes in the rest of the film. Every time I'd suggest a change in Ghajini from the original, Aamir would firmly cut it down, saying we should stick to the Tamil script. But he decided we should rewrite the climax. The entire location, incidents and dialogues for the climax were re-written by Aamir. I think the Hindi version is far better than the Tamil Ghajini because of the changes Aamir made.

=== Influences ===
Murdagoss's original 2005 Tamil version of Ghajini was inspired by the American film Memento (2000), which itself was adapted from the short story "Memento Mori". The film stars Guy Pearce as Leonard Shelby, a former insurance fraud investigator searching for the man he believes raped and killed his wife during a burglary. Leonard suffers from anterograde amnesia, which he contracted from severe head trauma during the attack on his wife. Certain concepts like writing notes behind instant Polaroid photographs and tattooing facts on his body are also similar. According to Khan, "Ghajini is not a remake or even slightly inspired by Memento, but rather a remake of the Tamil film, Ghajini". However, he acknowledged that Murgadoss's original Tamil film was at least partly inspired by Memento, stating, "Murgadoss had heard about a film called Memento and the concept had really fascinated him. Without having seen the film he went ahead and wrote his own version of the script and screenplay. Having finished his script, he then saw Memento, found it very different from what he had written, and went ahead and made Ghajini."

The CGI opening brain sequence was inspired by the 1999 film Fight Club by David Fincher. This sequence was also used in the Tamil version of the film.

The film's title is a reference to Mahmud of Ghazni, the tenth-century Sultan of the Ghaznavid Empire whose name is pronounced "Ghajini" in Tamil. Several comical scenes in the film are similar to Happy Go Lovely (1951).

=== Filming ===
Shooting started in Chennai in May 2007. Climax was shot in Old City, Hyderabad. Other filming locations included Bangalore, Cape Town in South Africa, the Deadpan Desert in Namibia and Mumbai. Aamir Khan had spent a year working out at the gym, training for his role. This film marked the Bollywood debut for Asin. The film's production budget was ₹65 crore (US$14.94 million).

== Release ==
Ghajini was released on 25 December 2008 with an estimated 1,500 prints worldwide, including 1,200 prints (digital and analogue versions) in the domestic market, making it the largest Bollywood release at that time. The domestic rights were sold to Geetha Arts for ₹530 million, while satellite, overseas and home media rights were sold at a total of ₹400 million, breaking the records of Shah Rukh Khan's film Om Shanti Om's ₹730 million.

The overseas distributors, Reliance Entertainment released the film with 300 prints in 22 countries, including 112 prints in the US and Canada, 65 prints in the UK and 36 prints in the UAE. Ghajini was also released in Norway, Germany, Denmark, Netherlands, Belgium, South Africa, Australia, New Zealand, Hong Kong and Singapore. It had around 650 paid previews which fetched it around ₹70 million.

=== Home media ===
The two-disc collector's edition DVD was manufactured by Big Home Video and distributed by international distributor, Adlabs Films Ltd. (now Reliance MediaWorks) on 13 March 2009.

=== Video games ===
A PC video game based on the film was manufactured and produced by FXLabs Studios Pvt Ltd and Geetha Arts, and marketed and distributed by Eros Home Entertainment: Ghajini – The Game. It is a third-person action game consisting of five levels of play; here the player controlled the protagonist Sanjay to accomplish missions using martial arts, weapons, and artefacts. It was hailed as India's first true 3D PC game with an MSRP of US$14.99. Although never officially rated, the distributor recommends that 15+ year old players partake in the game.

Mobile video games were also released by Indiagames based on the film including Ghajini The Game and Ghajini Ultimate Workout.

=== Controversy ===
Director A. R. Murugadoss was arrested shortly before the film's completion. According to Salem Chandrasekhar, the producer of the Tamil original, he had not bought the rights to remake the film in Hindi.

In an interview with CNN-IBN, Anil Kapoor sarcastically mentioned that director Christopher Nolan, who directed Memento (2000), from which Murugadoss based off the story of Ghajini, was very upset with the latter. He reportedly told Anil, "I have heard that one of my films has been copied. I (Kapoor) said Ghajini. He was very upset about it. I told Aamir also. I told (Nolan) the film had just been released over there and is a big success. (He then said) Yeah, no money, no credit, no nothing.”

== Reception ==
=== Critical response ===
On review aggregator Rotten Tomatoes, the film received an approval rating of 54% based on 13 reviews, with an average rating of 5.90/10.

Rajeev Masand of CNN-IBN wrote "Ghajini isn't a particularly good film, but entertainment it delivers by the bucketful." Martin D'Souza of Bollywood Trade News Network notes its flaws in the script, while praising the action sequences. Taran Adarsh of Bollywood Hungama remarked that the movie "is a winner all the way". Nikhat Kazmi of The Times of India praised the performance by Aamir Khan as its high point. Zee News described Aamir's performance as his best to date.

Sukanya Verma of Rediff describes the film as "a sleek album of dark memories, which are terrifying to relive and shattering to experience". Noyon Jyoti Parasara of AOL India said, "Most comparisons often point out that a remake is not as worthy.Ghajini however succeeds when it is compared to the Tamil version directed by the same director." Anupama Chopra of NDTV said "Ghajini isn't a great film or even a very good one but I recommend that you see it. It is, as we used to say in the old days, paisa vasool. Kaveree Bamzai of India Today said that "This is brutality, choreographed by a poet, and therefore that much more compelling."

Gaurav Malani of India Times criticises its length while praising the performance of the cast. Raja Sen of Rediff criticised the performance of Asin while concluding, "overwhelming feeling is one of regret". Shubhra Gupta of Express India concluded that Ghajini is too long, too violent, and criticised Jiah Khan's acting and dancing skills, but praised the performances of Aamir Khan and Asin. Hindustan Times wrote "You'd like to give Ghajini a long-term memory loss. Kya, kyon, kahan? Murugadoss.? Aamir? Asin? Who? Got to jog my memory... maybe after 15 minutes."

=== Box office ===
Ghajini released worldwide on 25 December 2008, on Christmas Day. The film became the first-ever Bollywood film to open in double digits, collecting ₹102 million ($1.27 million) on its opening day, followed by ₹118 million ($1.47 million), ₹102.5 million ($1.28 million) and ₹87.5 million ($1.09 million), taking its four-day opening weekend collection to ₹410 million ($5.13 million). The film went past ₹1 billion ($12.5 million) domestically in its fourth week, thus becoming the first ever Bollywood film to cross ₹100 crore net domestically. It was the first Bollywood film to enter the 100 crore club.

Ghajini became the highest-grossing Indian film ever at the time, and was declared an "All Time Blockbuster". Its record was surpassed a year later by another Aamir Khan film, 3 Idiots (2009).

== Soundtrack ==
Ghajini

Soundtrack album by A.R. Rahman
- Released: 24 November 2008
- Recorded: Panchathan Record Inn and AM Studios
- Genre: Feature film soundtrack
- Length: 34:00
- Label: T-Series
- Producer: A. R. Rahman

A.R. Rahman chronology
Yuvvraaj (2008)	Ghajini (2008)	Slumdog Millionaire (2009)

The film has six songs, including two remixes, composed by A. R. Rahman and with lyrics penned by Prasoon Joshi.

Track list
No.	Title	Artist(s)	Length
1.	"Aye Bacchu"	Suzanne D'Mello	3:48
2.	"Behka"	Karthik	5:13
3.	"Guzaarish"	Javed Ali and Sonu Nigam (humming)	5:29
4.	"Latoo"	Shreya Ghoshal Backing vocals: Tippu, Benny Dayal, Karthik	4:30
5.	"Kaise Mujhe"	Benny Dayal and Shreya Ghoshal	5:46
6.	"Behka (Remix by Dj A-Myth)"	Karthik	5:13
7.	"Guzaarish (Remix by Dj A-Myth)"	Javed Ali and Sonu Nigam (humming)	5:29
8.	"Kaise Mujhe"	Instrumental	4:01
Total length:			34:00

=== Reception ===
Professional ratings
Review scores
Source	Rating
Rediff	5/5 stars
Bollywood Hungama	4/5 stars

Bollywood Hungama wrote, "The music of Ghajini is all set to make waves way into 2009 after the Christmas release of the film. When 'best of the best' list would be compiled at the year end, it would be hard to ignore Ghajini." Rediff.com gave it the highest possible rating of five stars with the reviewer praising Rahman saying, "This could just be one of his finest albums ever. Not just are the tracks great, but each one segues into the next with perfect unpredictability." According to the Indian trade website Box Office India, the soundtrack album sold about 1.9 million units, making it the year's best selling Bollywood music soundtrack album.

== Awards and nominations ==
Awards	Category	Recipients and nominees	Results	Ref.
Screen Awards	Most Promising Newcomer - Female	Asin	Won	
Screen Awards	Best Film	Ghajini	Nominated	
Screen Awards	Best Actor	Aamir Khan	Nominated	
Screen Awards	Best Actress	Asin	Nominated	
Stardust Awards	Superstar of Tomorrow - Female	Asin	Won	
Stardust Awards	Hottest New Filmmaker	A. R. Murugadoss	Won	
Stardust Awards	Hottest New Film	Ghajini	Won	
Filmfare Awards	Best Female Debut	Asin	Won	
Filmfare Awards	Best Action	Peter Hein	Won	
Filmfare Awards	R. D. Burman Award for New Music Talent	Benny Dayal for Ghajini, Yuvvraaj and Jaane Tu... Ya Jaane Na	Won	
Filmfare Awards	Best Film	A. R. Murugadoss	Nominated	
Filmfare Awards	Best Director	A. R. Murugadoss	Nominated	
Filmfare Awards	Best Actor	Aamir Khan	Nominated	
Filmfare Awards	Best Actress	Asin	Nominated	
Filmfare Awards	Best Supporting Actress	Jiah Khan	Nominated	
Filmfare Awards	Best Music Director	A. R. Rahman	Nominated	
Filmfare Awards	Best Lyricist	Prasoon Joshi for Guzarish	Nominated	
International Indian Film Academy Awards	Star Debut of the Year - Female	Asin	Won	
International Indian Film Academy Awards	Best Special Effects	Prime Focus	Won	
International Indian Film Academy Awards	Best Action	Peter Hein, Stun Shiva	Won	
International Indian Film Academy Awards	Best Sound Recording	Resul Pookutty, Amrit Pritam Dutta	Won	
International Indian Film Academy Awards	Best Film	Madhu Mantena, Allu Aravind, Tagore Madhu	Nominated	
International Indian Film Academy Awards	Best Director	A. R. Murugadoss	Nominated	
International Indian Film Academy Awards	Best Actor	Aamir Khan	Nominated	
International Indian Film Academy Awards	Best Actress	Asin	Nominated	
International Indian Film Academy Awards	Best Villain	Pradeep Rawat	Nominated	
International Indian Film Academy Awards	Best Music Director	A. R. Rahman	Nominated	
Producers Guild Film Awards	Best Director	A. R. Murugadoss	Won	
Producers Guild Film Awards	Best Film	Madhu Mantena	Won	
Producers Guild Film Awards	Best Screenplay	A. R. Murugadoss	Won	
Producers Guild Film Awards	Best Actor	Aamir Khan	Nominated	
Producers Guild Film Awards	Best Actress	Asin	Nominated	
Producers Guild Film Awards	Best Director	A. R. Murugadoss	Nominated	
Producers Guild Film Awards	Best Music	A. R. Rahman	Nominated	
Producers Guild Film Awards	Best Singer (Male)	Sonu Nigam, Javed Ali for Guzarish	Nominated	
Producers Guild Film Awards	Best Singer (Female)	Suzanne D'Mello for Aye Bacchu	Nominated	
Producers Guild Film Awards	Best Cinematography	Ravi K. Chandran	Nominated	

== See also ==
- Short-term memory loss
- Declarative memory
