= Playing History 2 - Slave Trade =

2013 video game

- Developer: Serious Games Interactive
- Publisher: Serious Games Interactive
- Platforms: Windows, Mac OS X
- Release: September 13, 2013
- Genre: Educational game
- Mode: Single-player

Playing History 2 - Slave Trade is a game developed and published by Serious Games Interactive, and released on September 13, 2013, for Windows and Mac OS X on the Steam platform. The game is intended to be an "edutainment" experience, teaching players about the Atlantic slave trade.

The game caused a great deal of controversy for its inclusion of a "Slave Tetris" minigame, which was later removed, and other depictions of slavery seen to be offensive.

== Development ==
Free downloadable versions of the games were uploaded to the series' website.

== Gameplay ==
The main character is a young slave boy named Tim, who must help his master, a slave ship captain, transport 300 slaves to the Americas. The player must pilot the slave ship, collecting items that replenish food and avoiding wind blasts. Other minigames in the game include a Tetris-like mode in which the player needs to "stack" slaves in the storage compartment of the ship; this feature was removed in later releases of the game. The player can help their master bargain with the locals to reduce the price of slave children, in order to earn points.

== Reception ==
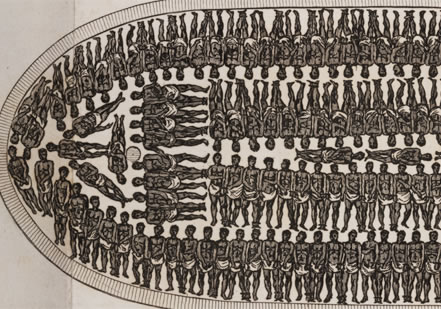
The depiction of packing slaves into slave ships (historical diagram pictured) as a Tetris-like minigame was a major point of criticism

During the game's campaign on Steam Greenlight, users raised concerns about the game but the game's developers defended the controversial "Slave Tetris" mode. After the game was released on Steam, several years after its original release date, a large number of users complained that the game trivialized slavery. The game's developers removed the Tetris-like level and issued an apology on Steam. The game's trailer was also updated.

Despite this, critics still condemned the game for other issues, such as the player picking up icons of "cakes and wine" while collecting food, and the most sympathetic character in the game being a white doctor. Katherine Cross of Gamasutra called the entire game a "dismal, tone-deaf failure at education" that trivialized slavery, and criticized the Serious Games CEO Simon Egenfeldt-Neisen for blaming oversensitive critics and cultural differences for the debacle and not the poor quality of the game itself.

== Other games in series ==
Playing History: the Plague was given a positive review by Erik Champion in his book "Playing with the Past", where he praised it as an amusing game that appealed to a younger demographic.

== See also ==
- Freedom! (video game) – Educational video game also about the enslavement of Africans and controversial for content perceived as offensive
