= Global Conflicts: Latin America =

2008 video game

- Developer: Serious Games Interactive
- Designers: Simon Egenfeldt-Nielsen, Nick Price and Alex Uth
- Platforms: Mac OS X, Windows
- Release: EU: October 23, 2008
- Genre: Adventure
- Mode: Single-player

Global Conflicts: Latin America is a serious game. It was developed by Serious Games Interactive for Mac OS X and Microsoft Windows.

== Summary ==
Global Conflicts: Latin America lets players explore key problems in Latin American countries.

In GC:LA, the player assumes the role of an investigative journalist on assignment in Bolivia, Guatemala, and Mexico where human rights violations, debt slavery, corruption, trafficking of humans, and pollution threaten the existence of the people. The player experiences situations taken from real life and develops an understanding of the conditions under which millions live. The goal of the game is to gather information to be used in confrontational interviews with people central to the conflict.

When they are done, the player is given a rating to show how well he has done in gathering information and using this to push people to get confessions for the article.

== See also ==
- Global Conflict: Palestine
