= Galactic Civilizations II: Twilight of the Arnor =

- Developer(s): Stardock
- Publisher(s): Stardock
- Designer(s): Brad Wardell
- Platform(s): Microsoft Windows
- Release: April 30, 2008
- Genre(s): Turn-based strategy
- Mode(s): Single-player

Galactic Civilizations II: Twilight of the Arnor, released April 30, 2008, is the second expansion pack to the turn-based strategy video game Galactic Civilizations II: Dread Lords, following the first expansion pack Galactic Civilizations II: Dark Avatar, released February 2007. It has been affirmed by the developer, Stardock, that this is to be the last expansion.

== Storyline ==
According to the backstory of the game's main campaign, the Drengin and the Korath races are at war, with the latter wishing to annihilate and the former merely to enslave the Galaxy. Purportedly, the two sides are manipulated by the Dread Lords, who are biding their time in preparation for their next assault. At the same time the Earth is isolated and safe behind an impenetrable barrier, and pockets of its once mighty Navy are searching for ways to end the Dread Lord menace once and for all.

As the game's main campaign progresses, it is revealed that one lone Terran Alliance ship runs across one of the Arnor, a race of beings descended from the same beings as the Dread Lords but who took a more benign path. According to the game's plot, the humans then learn the key to defeating the Dread Lords. This involves massive Death Star-like vessels called Terror Stars.

== Reception ==
Like its predecessors, the expansion pack received very positive reviews from critics, with Metacritic giving it a score of 92 out of 100.
