= Geneforge (video game) =

2001 role-playing video game

- Developer: Spiderweb Software
- Publisher: Spiderweb Software
- Designer: Jeff Vogel
- Programmer: Jeff Vogel
- Artist: Andrew Hunter
- Series: Geneforge
- Platforms: Mac OS, Microsoft Windows
- Release: Mac OS: NA: December 12, 2001; Microsoft Windows: NA: March 19, 2002 (Online); NA: November 3, 2011 (Steam)
- Genre: Role-playing
- Mode: Single-player

Geneforge is the first video game in the Geneforge series of role-playing video games created by Spiderweb Software.

The player assumes the role of an apprentice Shaper, a sect of mages who can create living creatures through force of will. The apprentice is cast away on Sucia, an island deserted by the sect 200 years ago. The island contains groups of the Shapers' creations who have formed their own ideologies regarding their creators in the intervening years. The primary motivation of the player is to escape the island and, in the process, deal with the forces working to steal the Shaper secrets abandoned on Sucia Isle.

The setting came from the idea of players being able to create and control a group of obedient creatures. The Shapers and the world of Geneforge were the result of Vogel imagining how a being would possess such power and how they would use it. The setting, a mixture of science fiction and fantasy, differs from the pure science fiction setting the game had been envisioned as. Vogel had difficulties balancing gameplay with the powerful directed-energy weapons players would expect to use in a science fiction game. Sales exceeded the developer's expectations, despite fears that the departure from Spiderweb's Avernum series would deter players. Geneforge received a positive reception from reviewers, despite the quality of the graphics being rated as poor and the game containing one piece of music, the title theme. The plot and setting were praised by reviewers for uniqueness and detail.

== Gameplay ==
Players create a character and travel around Sucia Isle, a location Barred to the members of the player character's sect. While searching for a way off the island, the game's ultimate goal, players can form alliances with the island's inhabitants and complete quests through combat or other means. Geneforge is played in 45° axonometric perspective. Movement through the environs is real-time, but switches to turn-based combat in the playing field. The game world is divided up into 77 areas accessible through a world map. The first two areas serve as the tutorial, introducing players to navigation, controls and shaping creations. Clearing areas by defeating guardians or successfully traversing the terrain allows players to bypass those areas via the world map, reducing traveling time. The game has an on-screen automap, which begins each area completely darkened, and is revealed as the player explores. When the player's party performs tasks or defeats enemies, they receive experience, leading to increased levels and additional skill points. The player character's skill points can be used to increase their statistics or to improve their aptitude in one of the fifteen available skills. Canisters which increase skills or add new abilities are scattered throughout the game.

Before starting the game, players choose from three basic character classes, each of which has a particular playing style. Guardians are fighters who excel in standard combat skills, especially hand-to-hand fighting. They are capable of shaping creations, but have little affinity for magic. Agents excel in spell casting and are capable of hand-to-hand combat, but have poor shaping skills. The Shaper is a summoner, capable of creating living creatures by using their own life essence. Shapers rely on their creations for protection. Every character class is referred to as "Shaper" during the game. Most objectives must be completed via combat or diplomacy, but players can also use subterfuge to pass obstacles. All three character classes can use different methods, depending on which skills they are adept in. Some areas are difficult to pass, and some tasks are difficult to complete, unless the player character is a certain class. Each character class has a different combat style, and the combat skills they are associated with cost fewer skill points to increase.

Essence is used for both creating creatures and casting spells; the number, type and strength of creations is limited by the player's essence capacity. For instance, if a character with 70 maximum essence summons a creature which costs 20 essence, their maximum essence is reduced to 50 until the creation is destroyed, either through combat or being absorbed by the Shaper. A total of 18 different creations are featured in the game, with larger and stronger creatures costing more essence to create. The types and strengths of creations can be altered depending on the player's combat style. Creations accompanying the player receive a percentage of the experience points from completing quests or defeating foes, levelling up and getting skill points in the same manner as the player character. These skill points can be spent to improve creations' statistics, but every statistic increase costs more essence and reduces the amount of essence available to summon other creations or cast spells. Essence and health are regained from Shaper-designed pools or by entering a friendly town.

Combat is turn-based, with each character in the player's party receiving action points at the beginning of the player's turn. The number received is dependent on the items the player character has equipped and the skills the character or creations possess. Each action uses a specific number of points. For example, moving one square takes a single point and attacks or spells take five. Attacking or spellcasting with fewer than ten action points immediately ends the character's turn, otherwise a character can continue to act until they run out of points. Most enemies will attack the player on sight, retreating in terror if they reach a certain threshold of damage without being killed. Other specialized behaviors are also present, including creatures which call for help, or creatures that act as sentries and retreat to an ambush location when threatened. Creations made by the player character can also be controlled by a similar artificial intelligence, or the player can invest more essence into the creation's intelligence and control them manually.

Geneforge's dialogue is delivered through on-screen text. Encounters with intelligent creations or humans result in the player being shown a series of pre-determined questions or responses. Conversation options and the outcome of them change according to the player's previous interactions. Conversions can vary based on which quests have been completed, which items the player has, which group the player belongs to and the player's leadership skill. The player can collect items from defeated enemies and the environment to improve their own equipment. Non-player characters can trade with the player, purchasing most items regardless of type. The shopkeeper has a fixed amount of gold at the start of the game which does not replenish itself. It is possible for the player to drain all shopkeepers of their gold reserves, making it impossible to sell further items.

== Plot ==
A Shaper explores one of the dungeons with his creations

The player begins as an initiate of a powerful sect of magicians, the Shapers. Members of the sect create living beings from the magical essence within themselves. Apprentices are sent to academies to learn the art of shaping and the player's character has been accepted to do so. The player departs on a voyage to the academy aboard a specially modified Drayk, a dragon-like Shaper Creation. During the journey, the Shaper passes a group of islands, one of which is recognized as the Barred Sucia Island. Locations Barred by the Shapers are closed to both the sect and outsiders alike, meaning a catastrophe has occurred or something very valuable is located there. As the Shaper examines Sucia, lost in thought, the craft is attacked and heavily damaged by an unidentified sailing ship. After igniting the vessel's sails with a fireball, the craft deposits the Shaper on an abandoned dockside before dying. The player is now stranded on Sucia Island and must find a way to leave.

Exploration of the docks reveals a strange canister filled with swirling liquid. Thinking the canister contains healing or energizing properties, the Shaper breaks the seal and absorbs the contents. The contents absorb into the Shaper's body instead, strengthening and changing it. The changes are visibly apparent because the player character's skin smoothens and glows slightly. The canisters also affect the user's mental state, causing a more violent and arrogant temperament.

Serviles remain on the island, having been abandoned when the island was Barred. They are intelligent creations of Shapers, designed to serve them without question or hesitation. These Serviles have had no contact with Shapers for two centuries, and have separated into three groups with differing philosophies regarding their creators. The Obeyers are still faithful to the Shapers. The Awakened believe that they should be treated as equals. The Takers have rejected Shapers completely and view the sect as oppressors to be fought.

After encountering the three servile groups, the player begins to learn of a group of foreigners known as Sholai, explorers who have been shipwrecked on the island. It was the Sholai, led by a man named Trajkov, who attacked the player with their last remaining ship. Trajkov controls a device called the Geneforge, created by the Shapers, that can rewrite the user's DNA and make them incredibly powerful. This is the cause of the island's Barred status, the device was deemed too dangerous in the wrong hands. Trajkov and his followers have allied themselves with the Takers, absorbing the contents of canisters and attempting to claim Shaper powers as their own. The group have been unable to activate the Geneforge itself due to a Shaper being needed to activate the device. A Shaper named Goettsch was kidnapped for this purpose, in the same manner as the player-character. Goettsch fled and stole the shaping gloves needed to safely use the Geneforge, causing Trajkov to attempt to kidnap the player as a replacement. During these events, some Sholai have escaped from their increasingly violent and unpredictable leader.

The player is free to join any one of the servile groups and share common goals, or remain unaligned. Geneforge can be completed without joining any group. Trajkov can be killed through combat or tricked into killing himself by using the Geneforge. He can also be assisted in activating the device if the player steals the shaper gloves from Goettsch. Goettsch offers the player fake shaper gauntlets, which do not protect Trajkov from the Geneforge's energy should he be convinced they are genuine shaping gloves. The player can complete the game by using the last boat on Sucia Island. The small vessel is moored in a guarded dock on the far side of the island. Finishing the game unlocks one of more than a dozen endings, dependent on the player's actions.

== Development ==
Work on Geneforge began during the development of Avernum 2. Initially little information was revealed. In an interview published by RPGDot, Vogel compared the movement system to Fallout and revealed that a new game engine was being implemented. The project had initially been intended as pure science fiction, but this was soon abandoned in favor of a mixed fantasy and science fiction setting. In an interview published on website RPG Codex, Vogel stated this was due to difficulties maintaining game balance with futuristic weaponry which "should be devastating". He added: "I found it to be too difficult to model the weapons in a way that simultaneously felt sensible and maintained balance".

Geneforge stemmed from the idea of creating a horde of creatures and the ability to care for those creatures or send them to their deaths. The choice was to be made by the player. From this point, Vogel considered who would be able to gain such powers, how they would control them and how these creatures would be treated. The game was developed with the intention of giving players choices; which factions to side with, how non-Shaper human outsiders are treated and whether to pursue goals through combat or diplomacy. Unlike most role-playing games, Geneforge was designed so that it would be possible to complete the game without using violence. Vogel cited Baldur's Gate II: Shadows of Amn, Planescape: Torment, Deus Ex and EverQuest as influences.

The game marked a departure from the Avernum series and its predecessor the Exile series. Vogel expressed a need to work on other projects: "Every few years, I need to do something cool and weird. It keeps me interested". He also added that the differences in Geneforge meant the game might struggle to find an audience, but the sales exceeded his expectations.

== Reception ==
Reception

Aggregate score
Aggregator	Score	
Aggregator	Macintosh	PC
Metacritic	N/A	72 of 100

Review scores
Publication	Score	
Publication	Macintosh	PC
1Up.com	N/A	B−
AllGame	3 out of 5	4 out of 5
GameSpy	N/A	80 out of 100
The Entertainment Depot	N/A	8.5 out of 10
Just RPG	N/A	92%
RPGDot	N/A	79%
Inside Mac Games	7.25 out of 10	N/A

Geneforge received positive reviews, with the story and lack of bugs being praised in particular. InsideMacGames' Christopher Morin suggested that players interested in a "strong storyline and a unique take on magic" would be impressed, but not those who sought high quality graphics and sound. The setting has been described as unique and fresh, and the level of detail in Geneforge's fictional world was praised by reviewers. Jeff Green of Computer Gaming World praised the game for its "story and gameplay" as something that high-budget games often lack.

The quality of the graphics was rated poorly by most reviewers. The reviewers noted that the overall quality of the game made up for this deficiency. GameSpy's Carla Harker described the graphics as "...dated by about seven years" and the game as a "technological pariah", despite calling it one of the best role-playing games released in the past year. Green similarly described the graphics as dated and something to put up with in favor of gameplay. Website Just RPG's Eric Arevalo described them as simplistic, but noted the story and the ability to control "fascinating mutant creatures" made up for this. The Entertainment Depot's Nick Stewart differed, praising the graphics as "simplistic without being plain, lavish without being overdone" as well as the fluidity of character animation and detail of character designs.

The almost total lack of music, except for the title screen theme song, and complete lack of voice acting was noted by reviewers. This highlighted the sound effects and environmental sounds, such as weapons clashing and the background noise of towns. Nick Stewart found "a fairly decent variety of effects and noises scattered throughout", that they "added somewhat to the experience", but became irritated by the amount of hissing and popping in the environmental sounds after extended play. Carla Harker described the sound as "almost non-existent" and Eric Arevalo found that there were not enough sound effects. RPGDot's Val Sucher noted that the music player Winamp could be played in the background, due to the game's small memory requirements.

Presently, a remaster titled "Geneforge 1- Mutagen" was released after a successful kickstarter backing. This remaster runs on more modern computers, and includes new content.
