= Geneforge 5: Overthrow =

2008 video game

- Developer: Spiderweb Software
- Publisher: Spiderweb Software
- Designer: Jeff Vogel
- Series: Geneforge
- Platforms: Mac OS X, Microsoft Windows
- Release: Mac OS X: NA: November 28, 2008; EU: December 10, 2008; Microsoft Windows: NA: February 19, 2009 (Online); NA: November 3, 2011 (Steam)
- Genre: Role-playing
- Mode: Single-player

Geneforge 5: Overthrow is the fifth and final video game in the Geneforge series of role-playing video games created by Spiderweb Software.

== Features ==
Unlike the first four Geneforge games, the player can choose between the original three classes (Shaper, Guardian, and Agent), as well as six rebel classes (Warrior, Infiltrator, Servile, Lifecrafter, Shock Trooper and Sorceress).

The screen in Geneforge 5 is considerably larger, with a bigger map and smaller icons, leaving much more room for viewing. The graphics were improved in numerous aspects, with better animations and cut-scenes than the first three games. The plot is more akin to that of Geneforge 2 in that there are multiple factions which the player can join, whereas in the third and fourth games there are only two major factions available to the player.

== Plot ==
In the beginning of the game, the player wakes up from an amnesiac trance, with no memory of the past. The player is in the service of Shaper Rawal, a powerful Shaper who seeks to use the player to increase his own political power. After performing a few tasks for him, he releases the player from his mountains, letting the player travel the world.

Wherever the player travels, there are various sects available to join. The Councillor Astoria, wishes to have peace with the rebellion. In a far eastern area of Astoria's domain, the player meets the former Shaper Litalia, who wishes them to join the Trakovites, a radical sect that supports the complete abandonment of all Shaping whatsoever. To the south the player encounters the main front of the war against the rebels General Alwan, who has been badly wounded in a war against the rebels and is confined to a life-support device and opposes any peace whatsoever. Even further south the player meets Sage Taygen, a mad, yet powerful Shaper who wishes to attain peace by creating a strain of bacteria that will wipe out all creations, giving the Shapers a blank slate to start anew. Finally, East of Alwan's lands is the Rebel domain, led by Ghaldring who wishes the player to kill the leaders of the other four sects in order to complete his rebellion.

As with the other Geneforge games, the player has complete freedom to join whichever sect they wish; this choice, along with a few other factors (such as canister use), determines the ending of the saga.

== Reception ==
The game was reviewed for Macworld, receiving 3 stars. HonestGamers reviewed it at 3.5/5. The game was also reviewed for Game Tunnel.
