= Global Conflicts: Palestine =

2007 video game

- Cover art
- Developer: Serious Games Interactive
- Designers: Simon Egenfeldt-Nielsen, Nick Price & Nicholas Francis
- Engine: Unity
- Platforms: Mac OS X, Windows
- Release: EU: July 5, 2007
- Genre: Adventure
- Mode: Single-player

Global Conflicts: Palestine is a third-person adventure video game developed by Serious Games Interactive for Mac OS X and Microsoft Windows. A sequel, Global Conflicts: Latin America, was released in 2008.

== Summary ==
The player assumes the role of a freelance journalist in Jerusalem facing challenges. The goal is to create and publish an article for a newspaper by collecting quotes from the in-game dialogue. The player can either get information by building up trust with each side or take a more confrontational approach to dig out information. In the end, the story with the most news-value will get the best exposure. The player must be careful what they submit for print, because it will affect their standings with both sides.

The game attempts to challenge the player's beliefs and ideas about the conflict and has support for educational use, including features such as an encyclopedia, primary sources, assessment and a teacher's manual. It is one of a series of games developed by Serious Games Interactive, under the joint title "Global Conflicts".

== Reception ==
A 2007 Eurogamer review gave the game a score of 6/10, claiming that it "takes inscrutability a tad too far at times". In the following year, an article published in the Columbia Journalism Review praised the game for its efforts to convey the difficulty of working as a journalist between two sides of a conflict.

In 2010, Serious Games Interactive was awarded a BETT Award in the category of "Secondary, FE & Skills Digital Content" for its flagship title Global Conflicts: Palestine.

== See also ==
- Conflict: Middle East Political Simulator
- Global Conflicts: Latin America
