= Gemsweeper =

2007 video game

- Developer: Lobstersoft
- Publisher: Lobstersoft
- Engine: Finity
- Platform: Windows
- Release: NA: May 29, 2007
- Genre: Puzzle
- Mode: Single-player

Gemsweeper is a thinking puzzle casual game developed by German studio Lobstersoft. During the game the player rebuilds the ruins of El Dorado by solving over 225 nonogram logic puzzles.

== Plot ==
In Gemsweeper the player assumes the role of a treasure hunter. When working in a museum putting together the pieces of a broken Olmec statue, the statue becomes alive and asks the player and old professor McGuffog to rebuild the mystical city of El Dorado. By solving over 225 puzzles, the player gradually rebuilds the ruins of the city and progresses his treasure hunter rank.

== Gameplay ==
The player has to uncover gems which are hidden behind some tiles and has to break all other tiles on the board. Numerical hints above and to the left of the board tell the player where the hidden gems are. Gems are picked up with a hand cursor whereas cursed tiles are smashed with a hammer. Jokers help if the player has to guess what's behind a tile.

Gemsweeper features an interactive tutorial to teach the player the basic principle of nonogram logic puzzles.

In Arcade Mode the gameplay is different from traditional nonograms. The puzzle does not contain a picture, but is abstract. As soon as a row is solved, a new row with different hints appear.
