= Geneforge =

- Series Logo
- Genre: RPG
- Developer: Spiderweb Software
- Publisher: Spiderweb Software
- Creator: Jeff Vogel
- Platforms: Windows, Macintosh
- First release: Geneforge; December 12, 2001
- Latest release: Geneforge 5: Overthrow; November 28, 2008

Geneforge is a series of demoware role-playing video games by Jeff Vogel of Spiderweb Software released for Microsoft Windows and Mac OS systems. There are a total of five games in the series: Geneforge (video game), Geneforge 2, Geneforge 3, Geneforge 4: Rebellion, and Geneforge 5: Overthrow. As with all Spiderweb Software titles, graphics and sound are limited because they are not the main focus of the game.

== Plot ==
The Geneforge storylines takes place in an era resembling medieval times, but with the addition of some modern innovations, such as wiring, levers and buttons, alarms, glass, and other tools. The games involve a group of mages called "Shapers", who dominate the game world due to their ability to create life as they see fit. The player character is cast as an apprentice Shaper in the first three games, as a neophyte rebel in the fourth, and as an unaligned amnesiac in the fifth. Crises in the game result from the Shapers' mistreatment of their creations while trying to ensure that their art does not wreak havoc on the world, versus the freedom of intelligent creations at the cost of such havoc. The player is left to determine the right course of action, such as using mysterious skill canisters which may breed arrogance in the user in return for increased power.

The games are highly non-linear, with multiple objectives allowing the player to join any sect, and receive one of a number of different endings (the canonical ending for each game being revealed in the following one). There is a high degree of player influence on the game world, and the existence of multiple solutions to problems. For example, one sect may give the player the quest to destroy an object, while an opposing sect will charge the player with its protection.

=== The Geneforge ===
The Geneforge itself is the culmination of the game world's technology, a means of genetic enhancement of living things that greatly increases their physical and magical abilities. All Geneforges thus far have taken the form of small colorful pools of semi-living chemicals, and are used through physical contact. Using the Geneforge is generally excruciating and requires protective equipment to prevent outright fatality. In the first, fourth and fifth games, the Geneforge is usable by humans (and in turn, the player), but in Geneforge 2 and Geneforge 3, it could only be used by specific intelligent creations. The first three games each climax with the player's decision to either destroy the Geneforge or to ensure its use. The Geneforge is encountered near the start of the fourth and fifth games.

== Gameplay ==
The games are played in a 45° axonometric view. "Real-time" adventure mode switches to a turn-based combat, reminiscent of classic RPGs such as Ultima VI. The lands are split up into small areas, which can be traveled through using a world map. Once a certain objective has been completed in an area, it can be skipped through on the world map, allowing the player's party to move very quickly across the land.

=== Combat ===
During combat mode, each character gets a certain number of action points, which are spent moving, attacking, casting spells, and using items. Unless enhanced or affected, the player and their allies in the Party Roster will start with eight action points.

The characters may attack with melee weapons, such as fists and blades, ranged weapons, such as thorn batons, wands, javelins, crystals, or magic spells. The chance of hitting an enemy is influenced by the character's attributes, such as strength, dexterity, or intelligence as well as the character's relative weapon or magic skills.

Equipment plays a significant role in a character's performance. The quality of equipment determines the damage dealt and received by the character. The player can use magically enhanced spores, pods, and rods to heal and strengthen themselves and their allies.

Creations, unable to equip or use items, are made before combat and can be used as powerful tools against enemies. There are three main classes of creations - Magical, that specialize in magical projectiles; Battle, that specialize in close combat; and Fire, that use a mix of projectiles and melee.

=== Character classes ===
At the beginning of the game, the player chooses from three classes of Shapers. When the player levels up, they gain several skill points, which can be spent on improving the character's abilities. Depending on the strengths and weaknesses of each type of player (Shaper, Guardian, and Agent), the skills have varying costs. The class's skills are generally exaggerated as the character levels up.

== Games ==
=== Geneforge ===
Geneforge is the first game in the series. It was released for Macintosh on December 12, 2001, and for Windows on March 19, 2002. The game engages the player into the origins of the Shapers as well as an introduction to the series as to the Geneforge itself. The player assumes the role of an apprentice Shaper who is cast away on a "barred" island by the sect 200 years prior. The island contains groups of the Shapers' creations, who have formed their own ideologies regarding the sect. The player must escape the island, after dealing with the forces at work to steal the Shaper secrets that were abandoned on Sucia Isle long ago.

=== Geneforge 2 ===
Geneforge 2 engages on how the tumult of the Geneforge influenced the Shapers and their creations, and takes place in an isolated mountain valley (revealed to be located in southwestern Terrestia in the final game). The game engine remains essentially unchanged from the original Geneforge. Geneforge 2 offers a number of changes and additions over its predecessor. Three extra creations and several new spells are available. In addition, the player can persuade some NPCs and unaligned monsters to join their party.

=== Geneforge 3 ===
Geneforge 3 deals with the fallout of the previous games as the battle lines are drawn, and takes place among the Ashen Isles. The Geneforge game engine was revamped in this sequel, improving gameplay in some instances while making other aspects more cumbersome. No new creations or spells are available, however a number of different features have been added. For instance, two NPCs (Alwan and Greta), will join the player's party and there is also a new forging system, allowing the player to create powerful artifacts or enhance existing items.

=== Geneforge 4: Rebellion ===
Geneforge 4: Rebellion picks up eight years later at the height of the rebellion against the Shapers, and is set in the east of the continent of Terrestia. Unlike the previous three Geneforge games, the player is no longer a Shaper, and is not restricted to the original three classes. Both of the player's companions from Geneforge 3 (Alwan and Greta) have grown up and are now leaders of the two rival factions in the game (the Shapers and the Rebels, respectively). The player can choose from five separate rebel classes, including a servile. The resolution in Geneforge 4 is considerably higher, using a larger map and smaller icons, increasing the player's overview. The graphics are improved, with better animations and cutscenes than the previous three games. The sounds and gameplay system however, remain unchanged.

=== Geneforge 5: Overthrow ===
Geneforge 5: Overthrow is the final game in the Geneforge saga and takes place near the end of the war, about four years after the conclusion of Geneforge 4: Rebellion. The player may choose from the three Shaper classes, as well as the six rebel classes. The graphics are improved in numerous aspects, with better animations and cutscenes. The plot is more similar to Geneforge 2 in that there are multiple factions which the player can join, whereas in the third and fourth games, there are only two major factions. The player must choose between the five factions and decide for themselves how the saga will end.
