= GP Challenge =

- Developer: Midas Interactive Entertainment
- Publisher: Midas Interactive Entertainment
- Platform: PlayStation
- Release: PAL: 2002-04-12
- Genre: Formula One racing
- Mode: Single player

GP Challenge is a 2001 Formula One racing game by Midas Interactive Entertainment.

== Gameplay ==
The game features teams from the 1998 season, but the circuits are based on the 1994 season. From the game's Main Menu: One can choose between a Single Race mode, or to go to the Options Menu.

In Single Race mode, one can choose from a selection of four circuits to race on, and the Grands Prix feature realistic schedules from a Formula One Race Weekend, including: Friday Practice, Saturday Qualifying, and Sunday's Grand Prix.

Also in Single Race mode, one can choose to have a Four-Race Championship Season, but manual work from the player is required to undertake in this. After each GP is completed, the game subsequently shows the points each driver has gained for that race. However, the game does not add up the scores each driver gets over the course of the Four-Race season. Instead, players of the game must write down the scores each driver receives after each race, and then add them up manually at the end of the Final Race to see if they have become the Drivers World Champion.

The Four Race Championship Season consists of Rounds 10, 13, 14, and 16 from the 1994 season. These tracks are Hungary in Budapest*, Portugal in Estoril, Spain at Jerez, and Australia at Adelaide. The races consist of either 3 or 5 Laps, depending on the players preference; and one can choose from three modes of difficulty: Novice, Amateur and Professional. The Hungarian Race is labelled as being Germany due to licensing issues.

The 1998 Teams are realistic in livery, but the drivers names are fictitious due to licensing arrangements; although the Drivers Helmet Livery's make it apparent to whom they are supposed to be. The game is similar to Ayrton Senna's Super Monaco GP II in this sense.

The game pits you in the seat of Eddie Irvine's 1998 Ferrari (the man who ended the 1999 season as vice-champion). The game however, does not allow you to switch to another car, so you must remain as the Irishman, although you can change the Driver Name.

== Reception ==
Reception

Review scores
| Publication | Score |
|---|---|
| PlayStation Official Magazine – UK | 5/10 |
| Next Level | 8.1/10 |
