= Ghajini – The Game =

2008 third-person action game

Ghajini-The Game
- CD-ROM Cover
- Developers: FXLabs (PC); Indiagames (Mobile)
- Publishers: FXLabs and Geetha Arts
- Engine: Torque (game engine)
- Platforms: Microsoft Windows; J2ME
- Release: 25 December 2008
- Genre: Action

Ghajini – The Game is a third-person action game based on the 2008 film Ghajini. It was published in 2008 by FXLabs and Geetha Arts, and distributed by Eros Home Entertainment. It was hailed as India's first true 3D PC game. The game consists of five levels of play, following the story of the protagonist, Sanjay Singhania (portrayed by Aamir Khan), avenging the death of his girlfriend Kalpana by using martial arts, various weapons, and other artefacts. Ghajini – The Game has earned Rs40 million. and has a manufacturer's suggested retail price (MSRP) of US$14.99

The game was designed by Shashi Reddy, who is the chairman of FX Labs, and Ghajini's co-producer Madhu Mantena.

== Story ==
After his girlfriend Kalpana is murdered by Ghajini, a deeply wounded Sanjay Singhania is rushed to a hospital, where he eventually survives, but ends up a patient of anterograde amnesia or short-term memory loss. With tattoos all over his body, polaroid photos and notes, he sets out to find and eliminate Ghajini and his henchmen, but has to first investigate his own flat and gather the tools for this mission and enter a restricted building to collect critical clues without getting caught.

== See also ==
- Ghajini (2005 film)
