= Gregory and the Hot Air Balloon =

1996 video game

- CD cover art
- Developer(s): Capitol Multimedia
- Publisher(s): Broderbund
- Director(s): Timothy R. Phillips; Larissa Shabasheva
- Producer(s): Dale DeSharone
- Writer(s): Matt Sughrue
- Composer(s): Tony Trippi
- Series: StoryQuests series
- Engine: Magic Composer
- Platform(s): Windows, Windows 3.x Macintosh
- Release: NA: October 1996
- Genre(s): Graphic adventure
- Mode(s): Single-player

Gregory and the Hot Air Balloon is a children's video game developed by Capitol Multimedia, published by Broderbund and released in 1996 for the Macintosh and Windows and Windows 3.x systems.

== Plot ==
In the town of Acorn Hollow, Gregory Chuckwood and his pet lizard Newt go for a ride in a hot air balloon, but accidentally drift away to a faraway place, due to Mr. Underwood's sneezing of inadvertently releasing the balloon with the rope snapping. With the balloon downed, Gregory needs to find the scattered balloon parts to get it going again so he and Newt can return home. Various puzzles, interactive objects and characters as well as minigames are found in the game.

== Voice talents ==
- Gregory Chuckwood - Peter Kozodoy
- Newt - John Davin
- Tina - Alice Johnson
- Nina - Chloe Leamon
- Zachary - Jeremiah Kissel
- Mr. Underwood - Merle Perkins
- Gregory's Father - Wren Ross
- Gregory's Mother - Wendy Sakakeeny
- Grandpa Chuckwood - Kria Sakakeeny
- Peter Porcupine -
- Tiffany Raccoon -
- Raccoon -
- Clarence Barker -
- Rabbit -
- Rabbit -
- Mrs. Huffin -
- The Ferris Wheel Mechanic -
- Clara MacMoo -
- Barker's Robot Band -
- The Clown -
- The Porcupine Clown -
- The Elvis Presley Ghost -
- The Great Mentallo -
- Birds -
- Tree -
- Ghost -
- Singing Ghost -
- Bat -
- Painter -

== Reception ==
Reception

Awards
Publication	Award
	Goldstar Award
Parents' Choice	Gold Award
