= Sorcerer King =

Sorcerer King is a 1985 board game published by Wotan Games.

== Gameplay ==
Sorcerer King is a fantasy strategy board game in which players take on the role of minor war leaders vying to claim the throne of a rediscovered Realm of Power. Once a bastion of law, the realm is now overrun by chaos, and rival wizards have also set their sights on its throne. Players must marshal their forces, cleanse the land of chaos spawn, and accumulate power points to become the one true Sorcerer King. The game supports 2–6 players, each beginning with identical units—magic-users, warriors, knights, dwarfs, elves, centaurs, and a troll. The initial objective is to capture a fortress guarded by chaotic enemies, after which the main quest unfolds. Players complete tasks like cleansing areas, sacrificing units to appease Chaos gods, and collecting magical items and spells. Power points, earned through combat, are used to recruit or promote units, enhancing their abilities and magical potential. Components include a colorful jig-locking map, 352 counters, 126 cards, and a concise rulebook. Movement involves mounted units traveling faster and centaurs able to carry foot troops.

== Reception ==
Andy Bamford reviewed Sorcerer King for Adventurer magazine and stated that "To conclude, SK could be a fun 'beer and pretzels' game, for when you can't be bothered with that 6-player game of Federation & Empire combined with Star Fleet Battles."
