= Goofy Golf Deluxe =

1999 video game

- Main menu screen
- Developer: Squeegee Software
- Publisher: Squeegee Software
- Platforms: Windows, Macintosh
- Release: August 16, 1999

Goofy Golf Deluxe is a 1999 video game from Squeegee Software.

== Gameplay ==
Goofy Golf Deluxe is a lighthearted miniature golf game featuring 54 holes spread across three themed courses. Players navigate whimsical obstacles such as fire-breathing dragons, sticky-tongued frogs, windmills, boxing gloves, cannons, and even an octopus. The game uses a clay animation style for characters and environments. Gameplay is simple: players rotate the mouse to aim, click to swing, and hold for power, with optional keyboard controls. It supports up to four players. The included course designer allows players to create custom holes using a drag-and-drop interface.

== Development ==
The game was developed by Squeegee Software, a Portsmouth, New Hampshire-based company founded in 1994. It was released on August 16, 1999, for Windows and Macintosh.

== Reception ==
Reception

Review scores
Publication	Score
All Game Guide	3.5/5
Inside Mac Games	4/5
IGN	6/10
Macworld	8.5/10

IGN gave the game a score of 6 out of 10, stating: "Computer miniature golf may not sound like an addicting game, but Goofy Golf Deluxe will keep you coming back for more. It would have been nice if the game had a wider variety of course motifs and more characters to play as (you can only choose to be a boy or girl) and a better defined sense of humor, but these are essentially quibbles with a very solid title".

MacAddict stated: "Goofy Golf Deluxe delivers what it promises: a simple putt-putt simulation that doesn't break any new ground".
