= Geneforge 3 =

2005 video game

- Developer: Spiderweb Software
- Publisher: Spiderweb Software
- Designer: Jeff Vogel
- Programmer: Jeff Vogel
- Artist: Andrew Hunter
- Series: Geneforge
- Platforms: Mac OS X, Microsoft Windows
- Release: Mac OS X: NA: March 28, 2005; Microsoft Windows: NA: May 30, 2005 (Online); NA: November 3, 2011 (Steam)
- Genre: Role-playing
- Mode: Single player

Geneforge 3 is the third video game in the Geneforge series of role-playing video games created by Spiderweb Software.

== Gameplay ==
he games are played in a 45° axonometric view and feature turn-based combat. The lands are split up into small areas, which can be traveled through using a world map. During combat, each warrior gets a certain number of action points, which are spent moving, attacking, casting spells, and using items. At the beginning of the game, the player chooses a type of Shaper to be. The three types are Shapers, Guardians, and Agents. Players gain a number of skill points by gaining a level, which can be spent on improving one or more of the character's abilities.

The Geneforge game engine has been revamped in this sequel, debatably improving gameplay in some instances and making others more cumbersome to deal with. No new creations or spells are available to players in Geneforge 3, however a number of different features have been added. For instance, there are two NPCs who will join the party, interject comments upon situations, and possibly leave if the player does something they disagree with. Their names are Alwan and Greta. There has also been a new forging system added, allowing players to create powerful artifacts or enhance existing items.

Unlike the previous two games, Geneforge 3 offers only two sides to choose from in the ensuing conflict. Players cannot get very far before being forced to choose a side, although they can change sides with some success fairly late in the game if they so desire, whereas the previous games were possible to complete without ever actually taking sides.

== Plot ==
The player begins as an apprentice learning the arts of Shaping. While attending school on Greenwood Isle the player character is awoken when the school is attacked. Luckily, two Shapers are ready to join the shaper and assist to survive in the world outside.

Alwan is a loyal Shaper Guardian who has only one skill, that of using his iron sword. He is trained as a Guardian, to obey without questioning. Due to there not being anyone he is able to obey, at first he is disoriented by the attack and does not know what to do. The player can get him to join only after obtaining permission from the servant mind in the school.

Greta is a castout from the school because she started to sympathise with the Shapers' creations. She was an Agent, skilled in magic (starts with Firebolt but the player can get teachers to teach her other spells later in the game) and battle arts (also a sword). She is living in the village, outside the school, that is aptly named South End. She consents to joining the player's group without any conditions.

It is discovered that a traitor Shaper named Litalia had orchestrated the attack on the school and other strikes against Shaper communities. She and others, including a former teacher at your school, believe that the Shapers are tyrannical rulers who make the lives of their creations miserable and should be stopped by extreme measures. The rebellion has been creating rogue spawners throughout the Ashen Isles, summoning creations that are causing chaos and attacking the Shapers and those who serve them. The player can choose between fighting for Litalia and her comrades, or allying with Lord Rahul and the Shapers and stifling the insurgency.

It is found that either Alwan or Greta will leave the player's group depending on which faction the player joins. Greta will leave if the player joins the Shapers due to her thinking that the player is inhumane and Alwan will leave if the player join the rebellion because he will think the player is disloyal.
