= Galactic Civilizations II: Dread Lords =

2006 video game

- Developer: Stardock
- Publishers: Stardock; Paradox Interactive
- Designers: Brad Wardell; Scott Tykoski
- Programmer: Cari Begle
- Writer: Brad Wardell
- Composers: Paul Kerchen; Mason Fischer; Eric Heberling
- Platform: Microsoft Windows
- Release: NA: February 21, 2006; EU: March 3, 2006; AU: March 23, 2006
- Genres: Turn-based strategy, 4X
- Mode: Single-player

Galactic Civilizations II: Dread Lords is a 4X turn-based strategy by Stardock for Microsoft Windows. It is the sequel to the 2003 game, Galactic Civilizations, and was released at retail and on Stardock's online subscription service, TotalGaming.net, on February 21, 2006. An expansion, Dark Avatar, was released in February 2007. A second expansion, Twilight of the Arnor, was released in April 2008.

Dread Lords is set in the 23rd century, when multiple alien civilizations, including Terrans, scramble to conquer the galaxy, planet by planet, by force, diplomacy, influence (culture), or technology. Dread Lords focuses on the single player experience that consists of a Campaign mode and a "Sandbox" mode, and omits multiplayer. The game is notable for its artificial intelligence, which is challenging without being given resources and abilities not available to the player, as is common in the majority of strategy games. The game was a modest commercial success, and it was received favorably by critics, winning multiple Editor's Choice awards. Stardock also opted for a rather unusual distribution strategy that lacks copy prevention, and allowed for extensive modding by the community.

A sequel, titled Galactic Civilizations III, was announced by Stardock on October 15, 2013. A pre-release version was made available through Steam in March 2014, which allowed customers to play the game while it is still in development. The sequel was the first game in the series to feature multiplayer and used hex-based game tiles. The full version of the game was released in May 2015.

== Storyline ==
The story of Galactic Civilizations II and the back plot of the ingame universe it inhabits is based on a series of short stories written by Stardock CEO Brad Wardell.

A powerful, highly advanced civilization, remembered in legend as the "Precursors", colonized much of the galaxy thousands of years ago. As younger specimens throughout the galaxy began to develop the beginnings of their own primitive civilizations, it led to a philosophical rift within Precursor society, splitting it into two factions. The Arnor faction wanted to guide the younger civilizations toward enlightenment. The Dread Lord faction wanted to exterminate them.

This dispute erupted into a catastrophic civil war. The Dread Lords came close to destroying the Arnor in the war's final battle. However, before the final blow was struck, the Dread Lords and the Arnor both mysteriously vanished.

The younger civilizations eventually began to explore the galaxy on their own but their progress was slow. The first wave of exploration was made possible after the invention of stargates. A stargate was expensive to build and would only transport a ship to another stargate, which first had to be constructed at the destination.

The youngest civilization, Humanity, obtained plans for the construction of a stargate after the Arcean civilization initiated first contact with them. Human scientists realized that, with the inclusion of a fusion power source, the technology behind the stargates could be modified to create a hyperdrive engine. Hyperdrive allowed starships to travel great distances on their own.

With the entire galaxy now within easy reach, the major space-traveling civilizations began a race to explore, colonize and, in some cases, conquer the galaxy. Armies were mobilized, fleets of warships were built and the galaxy was once again on the verge of total war. As the younger civilizations prepared themselves for the coming conflict, the Dread Lords began to return.

The player must guide Humanity's actions as they attempt to prevent Precursor technology from being discovered by their enemies, fight a galactic war between the major powers and survive the onslaught of the genocidal Dread Lords.

== Features and game concepts ==
The game is played in what is known as a "sandbox" galaxy mode, where the objective is to achieve victory over AI opponents in one of four ways - military conquest, cultural domination, universal alliance or technological supremacy. The sandbox analogy represents the free-form style of playing, where the player is free to develop the game however he/she chooses. This "sandbox" may be customized in terms of galaxy size, planet habitability and similar features as well as difficulty of the opposition. The game also includes a story-driven campaign, featuring the titular "Dread Lords".

=== Civilizations ===
The game has 10 playable preset civilizations, and also allows the user to create a custom civilization. Eight of the preset civilizations return from the original Galactic Civilizations game and its expansion: the Terran Alliance, the Yor Collective, the Drengin Empire, the Altarian Republic, the Drath Legion, the Torian Confederation, the Dominion of the Korx, and the Arcean Empire. The other two preset civilizations are new: the Iconian Refuge and the Thalan Empire. Minor civilizations (which do not factor into winning conditions, and have a weaker AI), such as the sentient rodent-like Snathi, can also appear in the game.

Each preset civilization has a distinct combination of AI, personality, and built-in advantages. The Korx, for instance, focus on money, and thus have an economic bonus. The Terrans are excellent diplomats, the Drengins have superb ships and soldiers, the Torese have fast population growth, and the Yor have very loyal populations.

=== Ship design ===
A custom ship on GalCiv II's main map screen.

One criticism of the original Galactic Civilizations was its lack of ship design features. New ships simply became available when the appropriate technology was researched to create them. Galactic Civilizations II includes a highly configurable 3D ship design editor. Technological research now unlocks components that players use to create their own custom ship designs in 3D from a variety of hull bases. The users' ships are rendered in real time and shown on both the main screen and in fleet battles. Other than component selection, the design of a ship has no effect on its combat abilities, since tactical combat is not a feature of the game.

Every ship is designed around a particular class of hull - tiny, small, cargo, medium, large and huge - and has a predetermined number of hit points and capacity. Each ship component takes up a certain amount of space. Technological advances can lead to enhanced components that take up less space (but which typically cost more to construct). Existing ships may be upgraded to use these new components, although it is often cheaper to use them as cannon fodder and replace them with newer ships.

There are three types of paired "offense-defense" combinations:

- Beam weapons and shielding
- Missiles and point defense
- Mass drivers and armor

Defenses work best against the offensive weapon with which they are matched. A defense mechanism used against a mismatched attack is diminished to the square root of the defense value (with a minimum of 1). For example, nine units of shield defenses would afford the same protection as only three units of armor when used to defend against mass drivers.

Engines are another component, and become available in increasing power/size ratios with later research. Several extra components available at all times include sensors, life support (for extra range), colonization, and construction modules. Each component may be added multiple times with summing effect; a player could create a fast long-range fighter with two lasers, two ion engines, a support module, and a shield.

A wide variety of non-functional components ("jewelry") such as wings, pylons, wheel structures, and lights may be added for artistic purposes. These take up no space and cost nothing to build. There are several sets of jewelry, one of which is assigned to each civilization, though the player is not restricted to choosing from these.

=== 3D engine ===
Galactic Civilizations II is powered by a custom 3D game engine, although most user interface elements are displayed in 2D. Planets and ships are restricted to a single plane in space, but the user may pan and zoom as they wish, even to view the details of individual ships. Players may zoom out to view the galactic map on a wide scale, at which point the ships, planets and anomalies are replaced by icons. It is possible to play the game in this mode.

The player's ship designs are tested in full-screen fleet battles in an environment separate from the main screen. The battles are not user-directed, but it is possible to watch from several viewpoints and fast-forward and reverse through them. Planetary invasions are dealt with separately, depending on a combination of general technology, soldiering ability, quantity of forces available to each side, and optional methods of attack (which tend to provide advantages at the cost of decreasing planetary quality or destroying planetary improvements).

=== A.I. ===
A major focus of Galactic Civilizations II is the artificial intelligence of its opponents, due in part to the deliberate omission of multiplayer in favor of the single-player experience. The game offers 12 levels of AI intelligence for opponent civilizations. Full AI capability is granted at the 7th level ("intelligent"). Levels 1 through 6 implement less sophisticated strategies/counter-strategies and (except for level 6) are hindered by economic handicaps. Levels 8 through 12 are aided by economic advantages and other bonuses.

The AI also makes use of technological developments to design ships of its own. At higher difficulty levels these ships are tailored to the opposition, so players sending fleets of laser-armed ships may find them repulsed by shielded defenders, while those preferring to employ mass drivers will find that they come up against heavily armored opposition instead.

Stardock has changed the AI's capabilities with various updates.

=== Planetary management ===
This planet has two 'bonus' tiles that can give a boost to the planet's food production and research.

In the original Galactic Civilizations, planets were part of a star system, and located in the same square. In Galactic Civilizations II, each planet (or colony) is a completely separate entity in space. Moreover, planets may now only have a limited number of improvements built upon them. A planet's class determines the number of improvement tiles that are available for building. There are improvements to aid manufacturing, research, planetary influence, morale, and the economy, as well as several "wonder"-style improvements similar to those popularized by the Civilization series of games.

Certain technologies allow the unlocking of extra tiles, a feature that allows more advanced civilizations to make better use of a low-quality planet. Planets may be focused on military production or research, allowing the creation of military outposts or research bases. In addition, a proportion of tiles offer bonuses for manufacturing, research, agriculture, influence or morale improvements built upon them.

The necessity of customizing planetary improvements (which is a big part of the game) can be an increased burden on the player. To help with this, the game offers an auto-update system that can automatically upgrade any available planetary improvements as new technology becomes available.

=== Economics ===
The largest departure made by Galactic Civilizations II from other 4X games is its economic system, which is very different from the systems used in most strategy games. Typically, 4X strategy games receive money based on a tax rate or based on the income of specific tiles in use by a city or planet. Civilization IV uses this system, and most other 4X strategy games use a variant of it. These incomes are increased by economic structures and sometimes by population, and the profit made off this economic income is used to pay maintenance fees and rush-build units. Galactic Civilizations II adds another layer of complexity by requiring that the income of an empire is used to pay for all forms of production. In order to produce one unit of product, be it research or manufacturing, the player must pay credits (usually in denominations of a Billion Credits, or BC). It is therefore critical that the player balances the economic income of their empire with their industrial output, and not just with the maintenance of their empire. If the player does not have the economy required to support an industrial planet, then they will have to spend at a deficit, and if the player does not correct their economy, they will eventually go broke. This stands in stark contrast to the Civilization series, where industrial output has nothing to do with the player's economic income.

=== Random events and alignment ===
At random times throughout the game, though commonly in colonizing new planets, the player is presented with ethical choices in the form of events where a wide-ranging decision needs to be made. Typically the good choice will cost the player something (either directly or indirectly). Conversely, the evil choice can bring benefits, albeit at the expense of other civilizations or the player's own population. A neutral choice is also presented as a compromise. To keep the game's ethics uncontroversial, the choices are made very clear-cut.

For example, one random event involves the creation of a super-serum that can enhance soldiers' performance at the expense of decreasing the life expectancy of those who take it. The player may forbid its use and destroy all of the research at government's expense (good), only allow it to be used by those who volunteer (neutral), or require all army recruits to take it (evil). In this case, the "loss" of the good choice is mostly an opportunity cost in terms of the foregone advantage.

The main advantage to making good choices comes in diplomacy with other civilizations; good civilizations are more picky about interacting with evil civilizations than evil ones are with good ones. In addition, once the "Xeno Ethics" technology is researched, it is possible to pick one of the three alignments, which grants access to various bonuses and improvements. Picking an alignment other than that already established by the player's actions costs significant amounts of money.

Some random events affect not only individual civilizations, but also the entire galaxy. These galaxy-wide events can upset the balance of power, transform weak civilizations into powerful ones, lead to wars between allies and even result in chaos. In one event, a civilization unearths an archeological relic that will eventually transform them into "god-like" beings. Some events can spawn devastating pirate fleets across the galaxy or triple one civilization's influence. Others are more benign, with all civilizations experiencing a short-term economic boom, or a "wave of xenophobia" (usually triggered by prolonged warfare) that halts tourism.

=== Starbases and galactic resources ===
A late addition to the original Galactic Civilizations game, starbases are a central component in Galactic Civilizations II. There are four main types of starbases:

- Military starbases, which help the player's ships in battle against other forces
- Economic starbases, which increase economic and social production in the surrounding region
- Influence starbases, which encourage nearby planetary populations to defect to the owner's culture
- Mining starbases, which are used to extort a bonus affecting your entire civilization

All four kinds of starbases may also be upgraded with defensive capabilities. The AI is more than willing to make its own starbases, and may take exception to the player building them too close to the AI's planets.

=== Civilization bonuses, politics and government ===
When designing a custom civilization, the player is given a set of points that can be allocated to various bonus abilities. These bonuses cover most game mechanics - it is possible to make a civilization with highly militant and loyal researchers, or with influential and highly prolific diplomats.

At the beginning of the game, the player chooses one of eight political parties, each with its own advantages. These advantages are cumulative with the civilizations bonuses, so they may be used to cement an established advantage, or to shore up a potential weakness. However, these bonuses are only preserved as long as the player's party stays in power, which depends on keeping morale up (generally above 50%). If the player loses an election they do not lose control of the game, only the bonuses previously granted. In addition, the bonus of the party currently in power (if you are not) is applied as a penalty to your civilization instead. Morale also has an effect on reported population, and thus on tax revenue, so it is important not to tax for short-term gain.

The player can eventually research advanced forms of government that grant significant bonuses to the economy and social production. However, it becomes increasingly harder to keep morale up while progressing from an imperial government to a republic, democracy or galactic federation.

=== The United Planets ===
The United Planets is a council formed of all major civilizations in the galaxy that regularly convenes to make decisions. The number of votes a civilization has in the council depends on their influence, which is partially a factor of population, but which is also affected by planetary improvements and civilization bonuses (among other factors). The United Planets does not usually have a great effect on the game, but some of the propositions — for example, the transfer of unique researched technologies, or the imposition of a certain governmental system — can be extremely destabilizing if passed. The player does have the option of permanently leaving the United Planets, but at the expense of losing all trade revenue.

=== Diplomacy and civilization relations ===
Diplomacy is a key part of the game. Players — both human and AI — may trade technology, starbases, ships, planets, and trade goods (unique improvements built by one civilization that provide a bonus to those obtaining them). Negotiation skill is an important factor which varies with inherent civilization bonuses and research; it can be possible to gain a significant technological advantage through careful trading with less sophisticated civilizations.

Each civilization has customized text used during negotiation that signifies their current relations with the player. Relations depend on a number of factors, including current trade, relative ethical alignment, belligerence, military might and past actions. AI players may decide to initiate technology trades or demand tribute from the player, or to warn them of perceived threats.

== Reception ==
Reception

Aggregate score
Aggregator	Score
GameRankings	87%

Review scores
Publication	Score
1Up.com	A
Eurogamer	8/10
GameSpot	9/10
GameSpy	4.5/5
IGN	8.7/10

Upon release, Galactic Civilizations II received positive reviews from GameSpot, GameSpy, and IGN. The overall critical reception was highly positive, awarding an average score of 87%.

The editors of Computer Games Magazine presented Galactic Civilizations II with their 2006 "Best AI" and "Best Independent Game" awards, and named it the year's sixth-best computer game overall. They wrote, "Galactic Civilizations II may not lead to a resurgence of space conquest games, but as long as it's available, the renaissance can wait."

Ten days after its launch, Galactic Civilizations II had matched the lifetime sales of its predecessor by that time, with 75,000 copies sold. According to Stardock's CEO Brad Wardell, as of March 2008, Galactic Civilizations II has sold around 300,000 copies in total, bringing in an eight-figure revenue, on a development budget of less than $1 million.

== Distribution ==
Stardock has not instituted any stringent or cumbersome copy prevention schemes in accordance with what its CEO Wardell has defined as the Gamer's Bill of Rights.

The game's CD contains no copy prevention and there is no requirement to have the disc loaded into the computer to play the game. Stardock's anti-piracy plan is that players must complete product activation with a valid serial number before they may receive any of the several game updates. Serial numbers can be used multiple times and the company owner, Brad Wardell, has stated that they are taking an approach based on the view that people who install the game illegally were unlikely to purchase it anyway.

Reselling copies of the game is against Stardock's license terms. Resold/used copies will not be supported, meaning that the buyer of a used copy cannot download game updates.

Copies of the game purchased from Stardock's online store use product activation before the game can be played. The game can only be installed and activated a limited number of times before needing to contact support. Installing on a computer without an internet connection require the files to be downloaded into an archive on another computer, and an activation data blob emailed to Stardock; a signature file is returned to be used on the activated computer.

On November 21, 2015 "Galactic Civilizations II: Ultimate Edition" was released DRM-free and without product activation on the digital distribution website gog.com.

=== StarForce controversy ===
On March 5, 2006, a StarForce employee publicly posted a working link to a BitTorrent search engine listing of Galactic Civilizations II torrents during a discussion about the popularity of the game. Their action was publicized on various websites, including Digg, Neowin, and Penny Arcade. Stardock also posted an article, partially in response to inaccurate reporting of their own reasons for releasing the game without copy protection. Starforce later closed the thread, posting an apology and stating that the employee "just wanted to show that every non-protected game can be cracked".

== Expansions and modifications ==
Cover art for Endless Universe

Stardock has released two expansion packs for the game as well as a major update (GalCiv 2.0). It will not release any more as they are currently working on their upcoming projects.

=== Dark Avatar ===
Stardock released an expansion pack named Galactic Civilizations II: Dark Avatar in February 2007. A number of things are added in the expansion, such as:

- Two new civilizations: a genocidal Drengin offshoot called the Korath and a civilization called the Krynn
- A new campaign in which the player leads the Drengin Empire
- The ability to create custom opponents
- An "environment" statistic to planets, which will determine which civilization can innately colonize or what technologies will be necessary for other civilizations to colonize different planets
- An enhanced role for espionage, special "Agents" being hired that can conduct various missions, such as sabotage or destabilization, on rival worlds, or act as counter-agents against rival agents attempting to conduct missions on the player's worlds
- Asteroid fields to the space map, for players to mine for resources. Resources from asteroid fields are directed to planets where they increase manufacturing capacity.
- A great deal of new ship hulls and jewelry
- The extermination of two civilizations during the campaign - the two exterminated civilizations will still be available in "sandbox" mode, but will not appear in the future releases of the game.

=== Twilight of the Arnor ===
A second expansion pack named Galactic Civilizations II: Twilight of the Arnor was released in April 2008, the expansion added new content to the game, such as:

- The ability to destroy solar systems with massive ships called "Terror Stars"
- Unique technology trees, planetary improvements, and weapons for each civilization
- A map pointer and custom scenario editor
- New graphics that reduce graphic memory requirements by over 90%
- New map size allows for games that may take millennia to complete

According to Stardock, Twilight of the Arnor is the final expansion for Galactic Civilizations II.

=== Endless Universe ===
Galactic Civilizations II: Endless Universe is a compilation featuring the content of Dread Lords, Dark Avatar and Twilight of the Arnor. It was released exclusively in Europe on September 26, 2008 and it was published by Kalypso Media. The compilation was released as Galactic Civilizations II: Ultimate Edition in North America on February 9, 2009.

=== Community support and modding ===
Significant modding features have been built into the game in terms of user-editable XML files. The ship designs are also intended to be redistributed to others, and popular models (both derivative and original) appeared shortly after the game's release.

Since September 2014, the game's community works on a Stardock endorsed community patch, whose beta version was already applied on the November 2015 gog.com release. On December 17, 2015 the community patch was canonized as official patch version 2.20 by Stardock.
