= The Corporate Machine =

2001 video game

- North American cover art
- Developer: Stardock
- Publisher: Take-Two Interactive
- Producer: Matthew Kreager
- Designer: Brad Wardell
- Programmer: Eric Heberling
- Artist: Mike Snyder
- Platform: Microsoft Windows
- Release: EU: February 13, 2001; NA: July 17, 2001
- Genre: Business simulation
- Modes: Single-player, Multiplayer

The Corporate Machine (known in Europe as Business Tycoon) is a business simulation computer game from Stardock in which the goal is to create a corporation in one of four industries (automobiles, aircraft, computers, or soft drinks) and eventually dominate rival companies. To win the player must dominate the chosen market (getting 55% to 65% of the market share depending on the number of opponents). The Corporate Machine is a follow-up to the game Business Tycoon, which was itself a sequel to the game Entrepreneur, all developed by Stardock.

== Gameplay ==
=== Starting Out ===
When starting a game, the player picks a company specialty. Three specialties are available: marketing, labor and research. Each specialty doubles productivity in that area. After picking a specialty, the start screen allows choice of how many opponents to be faced, the difficulty of the game, what map will be used (both real and fictional maps are available), starting funds, and what industry is to be competed in.

=== Exploring ===
The game is started at the home site (which is randomly chosen on the map) and with one sales executive. To introduce and sell the product to other regions, the region must be investigated. This process can take from 3 to 10 weeks depending on how far they are from the sites. After an area is explored, the player will know the market leader, if opponents have sites or units there, if the region has a resource, as well as statistics like what the targeted area desires in a product, their concerns with price, and how rich the region is.

=== The Sales Executives ===
The sales executives increase market penetration (the percentage of stores carrying the product) in their regions and all regions up to two spaces away from each executive. The sales executive can be moved around the map freely by plane; however, while in transit he will not grant any penetration benefit. To gain more sales executives the profit must be increased to a certain level by the end of a year. This gets harder later on as the amount to gain a new executive increases. It is also possible to get them through the use of Direct Action Cards.

=== Your Company Sites ===
These places are the player's base of operations. Manufacturing, research, and marketing buildings can be built and upgraded. Additional sites can be purchased but they become progressively more expensive. On the player's first site there will be a sales office and a garage, but every site after will only have a sales office and everything else has to be built. Other buildings include an intelligence facility, which will generate and display information in the form of graphs. Company stores can be built at any site to decrease employee expenses (and therefore lower employee cost).

To get better performance a training center will increase employee efficiency. Employee happiness becomes a factor as well, as an unhappy employee's performance will suffer, so a recreation center will boost morale. If market leadership is lost in an area where a site is, the employees' morale will drop sharply. Marketing, manufacturing, and researching buildings can be accessed in order to make adjustments to the multiple operations within the company. Sales buildings act similarly to sales executives that cannot be moved from region to region.

=== The Marketing Department ===
When a marketing building is built, it will be possible to hire and fire marketers. Marketing associates can be used to create marketing campaigns. As campaigns are created, marketing associate availability drops and the player is forced to build more marketing buildings in order to have more campaigns. These buildings can be upgraded to have more employees and to have more powerful marketing campaigns. Positive campaigns will boost the qualities of the player's product, or negative marketing campaigns to decrease the appeal of an opponent's product. For media, there are advertisements to print, and radio and television campaigns. Marketing campaigns can be moved from region to region similarly to a sales executive.

=== The Manufacturing ===
Starting with a simple garage, the player can upgrade to factories. Larger factories, and hire of additional employees, increase efficiency. Employees can be hired or fired as demand rises or falls. The production screen is where the price of the product is set. If the product is better compared to other companies then an overcharge can be made. The price should not be raised too far as demand will drop quickly if there are different companies in the same area and market leadership could be lost.

=== Research ===
This is where scientists develop new technologies to upgrade the product. The bigger the research building, the more scientists can be hired. Four projects can be queued so the player does not have to constantly have to come back to the screen and choose new technologies. Different projects also give different bonuses, such as decreasing the cost to manufacture or increase the appeal to consumers.

=== Direct Action Cards ===
Different regions may or may not have a resource in them. There are five resource types: Labor, Government, Intelligence, Marketing, and Underworld. Every year that a region is controlled that has a resource is one resource point. Having resource points allows the play of direct action cards.

The game is started with two cards and an additional card is received every year. Direct action cards cost resources, and may have a monetary cost in addition. Cards have effects such as receiving money from the government, a research boon, revealing large blocks of regions, twisting the desires of consumers, physical destruction of competitors assets, cutting costs through illegal activities, and publicity boosts. The direct action card system has been likened to the card game Magic: The Gathering.

== Development ==
The Corporate Machine expands on themes introduced in an earlier Stardock game from 1997, called Entrepreneur.

== Reception ==
Reception

Aggregate score
Aggregator	Score
Metacritic	80/100

Review scores
Publication	Score
Computer Gaming World	4/5
GameSpot	8.4/10
GameSpy	75%
GameZone	9/10
IGN	8.1/10
PC Format	64%
PC Gamer (US)	62%

The game received "favorable" reviews according to the review aggregation website Metacritic. Brett Todd from GameSpot describes the game having "winning design, powerful artificial intelligence, and a great sense of humor". GameSpy recommended it "if you're a fan of slower-paced games with more fun in the game itself than in its graphics."
