= Galactic Civilizations II: Dark Avatar =

- Developer(s): Stardock
- Publisher(s): Stardock
- Designer(s): Brad Wardell
- Platform(s): Microsoft Windows
- Release: February 8, 2007
- Genre(s): Turn-based strategy
- Mode(s): Single-player

Galactic Civilizations II: Dark Avatar is the first expansion pack to the turn-based strategy game Galactic Civilizations II: Dread Lords. It was released by Stardock in February 2007, both as a separately downloadable expansion and the combination retail box Galactic Civilizations II: Gold Edition.

== Plot ==
The Drengin Empire has conquered most of the galaxy, driving the Terrans back to Earth, where humans have created an impenetrable defence around the homeworld. The Drengin have focused their attention on the other conquered races. Krindar I'Agohl, leader of the Korath clan, a specialist military faction feared in combat even against the Terrans, urges the annihilation of all non-Drengin species. Formerly few could survive against the Korath in battle. Now none survive at all.

However, there is something mysterious about the Korath. They do not resemble normal Drengin species, and without slavelings the Drengin Empire is weaker, for genocide is not their way. You, as the Drengin Dark Avatar, are sent to enslave the universe, find out the truth about the Korath, and stop the extermination of it.

However, as the Drengin warlords begin to turn on each other, another faction called the Krynn Consulate tries to convert the other races in a crusade to spread its religion.

In the expansion, two races will die, two more will rise.

== New features ==
On October 9, 2006, Stardock owner Brad Wardell announced that the release of Dark Avatar was pushed back to February 2007.

As you guys gave us suggestions and new ideas we realized that we didn't want to have to wait until some future sequel to add in those features. So we're going to push the release date of the expansion pack to around the 1-year anniversary of the release of Galactic Civilizations II: Dread Lords

New features include:

- New parts to re-customize the player's ships.
- Certain species can thrive on worlds otherwise uninhabitable to other races until advancements in terraforming technology.
- Asteroids are mineable and give resources.
- Espionage and sabotage.
- New AI options.
- Diplomatic treaties.
- Visual make-over.
- Mega-events that can be set to intentionally destabilize the playing field from time to time, to keep things interesting.
- Race-specific super abilities.
- A streamlined tech tree that adds a few technologies and groups variations together on the tree view, so that e.g. technologies "Sensors" through "Sensors mark IV" make up one slot instead of four.
- Ship templates.

== Release ==
Dark Avatar is being distributed by electronic download, however one has the option of ordering a disk as well to negate the need to re-download should it need to be uninstalled for whatever reason. Currently all purchase options are priced in US dollars, although international customers can pay using a credit card or a service such as PayPal. A retail version of Dark Avatar is available for purchase at retail locations worldwide as Galactic Civilizations II: Gold Edition, which also includes Dread Lords and "Galactic Civilizations II: Dark Avatar".

== Reception ==
Initial reviews of Dark Avatar were highly favourable. The game received an aggregated score of 91% from Metacritic. Both GameSpy and IGN gave it Editor's Choice awards, while UGO rated the game an A. Reviewers cited the significant increase in customization options, a better artificial intelligence, and an improvement in graphics quality as decisive factors. GameSpy later named it their Game of the Month for February 2007. Criticism revolved around "uninspired" ground combat, a generic technology tree, and the continued lack of multiplayer support.
