= Serious Games Interactive =

Company in Copenhagen, Denmark

Serious Games Interactive is a games developer located in Copenhagen, Denmark. It is one of the leading developers in Europe for serious games and game-based learning.

== History ==
Serious Games Interactive was founded in 2005 in a partnership between Simon Egenfeldt-Nielsen and Unity Technologies. Since its inception the company has developed and completed more than 30 serious games related projects.

== Reception ==
In 2010 it was awarded a BETT Award in the category of "Secondary, FE & Skills Digital Content" for its flagship title Global Conflicts: Palestine. It was also awarded first place in the category of professional games costing more than 40,000 euros in the 1st European Best Learning Game competition for 'Playing History - The Plague'.

Their Playing History 2 - Slave Trade gained controversy for its trivialization of slavery, especially for its Tetris-like minigame where slaves were stacked into a slave ship.

Among their clients, Serious Games Interactive has the Danida, UNICEF, WWF, NATO, LEGO, Novo Nordisk, Amnesty International, Danish National Museum, Danish Radio and European School Network.
