= ID@Xbox =

Microsoft game development program

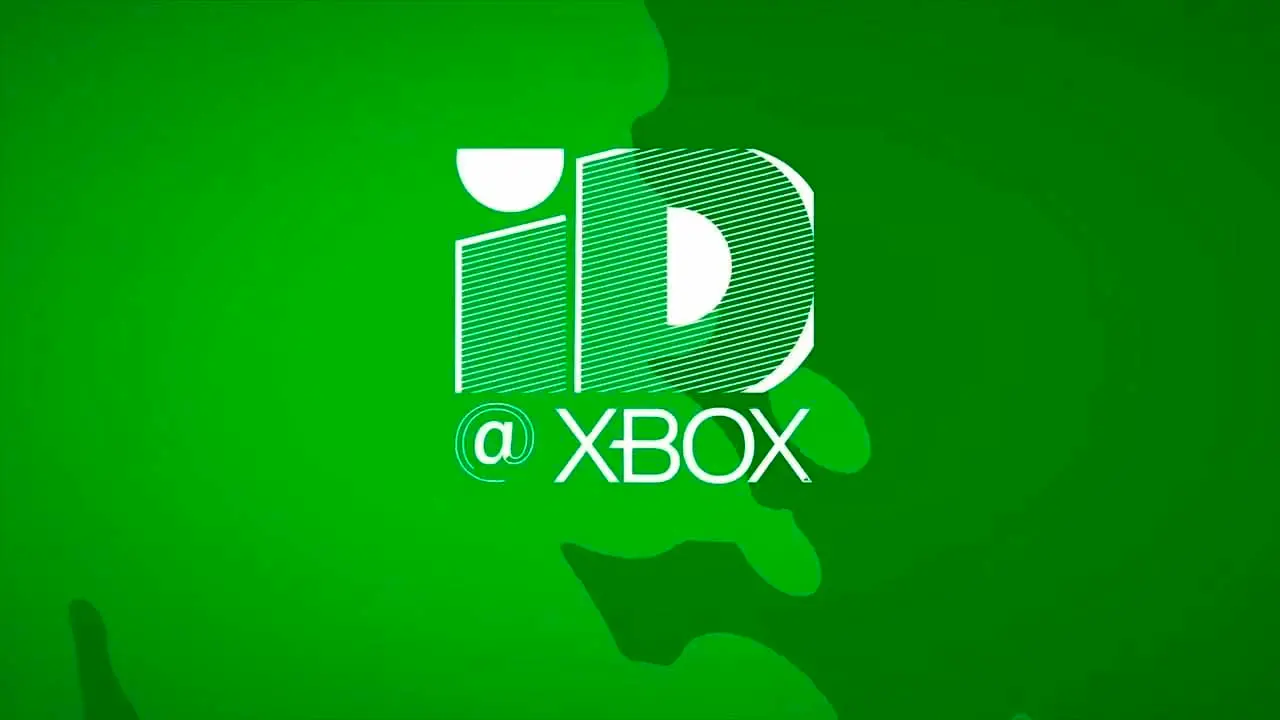
- Developer: Microsoft Gaming
- Launched: 2014
- Platforms: Xbox One, Xbox Series X and Series S, Windows
- Status: Released
- Website: Official website

ID@Xbox (Independent Developers @ Xbox) is a program by Microsoft allowing independent video game developers to self-publish titles for Windows, and the Xbox One and Xbox Series X and Series S home video game consoles.

== Overview ==
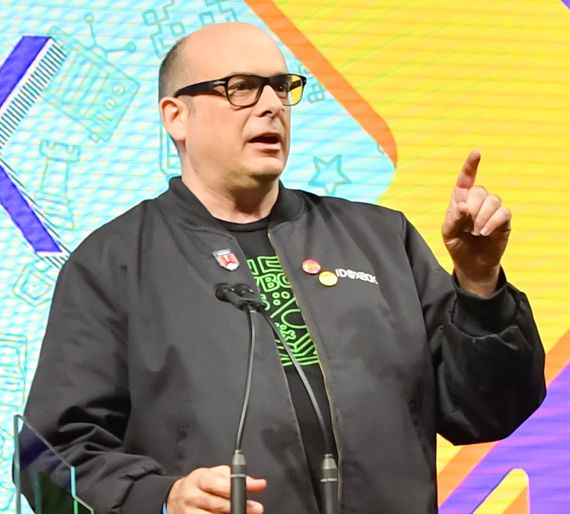
ID@Xbox director Chris Charla at the Game Developers Conference 2019

ID@Xbox was announced by Xbox Vice President Phil Harrison at Gamescom on August 20, 2013. General Manager, Marc Whitten was the sponsor of the project providing management and funding. Angela Hession was the Launch Architect of the program and developed the program based on input from Independent Developers. Chris Charla is director of the program.

Developers who are registered in the program get access to two development kits at no cost, as well as access to all required technical documentation. Additionally, there will be no fees to update any game submitted through the program. Games released through the program also have access to all Xbox One and Xbox Live components, including Kinect, Achievements and Xbox SmartGlass. Developers in the program also receive access to the Unity engine as well as an optional subscription to Unreal Engine 4.

At the 2017 Game Developers Conference, Microsoft announced it will launch the Xbox Live Creators program that, for a one-time fee, will allow anyone to develop for Xbox One and Windows 10 games using the Unified Windows Platform using any consumer Xbox One system (including Xbox One X console) and distribute directly through the Xbox Live storefront. Such applications will not have access to some Xbox Live features like achievements or multiplayer matchmaking, but will include support for leaderboards and party chat.

By August 2020, over 2000 games were released through ID@Xbox, and more than US$1.5 billion in royalties had been paid to the developers of these games. By March 2022, royalties and total revenue earned by independent developers through the program had exceeded $2.5 billion.

== Reception ==
A number of indie game developers have praised the introduction of the ID@Xbox program. Developers involved in the program have been impressed by Microsoft's responsiveness and the support provided on any issues that arise. The appointment of Chris Charla as director of ID@Xbox was met with positive reception, due to his background and previous involvement in the video game industry.

However, the program has received criticism for enforcing a launch date parity policy which means that developers can only release their titles on Xbox One if they haven't been released on other consoles first. Many developers have called for the policy to be dropped; Microsoft has since dropped the parity clause.
