= Galactic Civilizations III =

2015 video game

- Developer: Stardock
- Publisher: Stardock
- Producer: Derek Paxton
- Designer: Paul Boyer
- Programmer: Nathan Hanish
- Artist: Akil Dawkins
- Composers: Geoff Knorr; Mason Fisher; Michael Curran
- Platform: Microsoft Windows
- Release: May 14, 2015
- Genres: 4X, turn-based strategy
- Modes: Single-player, multiplayer

Galactic Civilizations III is a 4X turn-based strategy video game developed by Stardock for Microsoft Windows. It is the sequel to 2006's Galactic Civilizations II: Dread Lords. The full version of the game was released in May 2015. The game's first expansion, titled Mercenaries, was released in February 2016.

In October 2013, Stardock announced that the third installment in the Galactic Civilizations series was in production. A pre-release version was made available through Steam in March 2014, which allowed customers to play the game while it is still in development. It was the first game in the series to feature multiplayer and hex-based game tiles.

== Storyline ==
Ten years after the war against the Dread Lords, the Drengin Empire and their Yor allies reign supreme. Most of the races which allied against the Dread Lords have been exterminated or subjugated. Earth lies protected, yet isolated, behind its Precursor shield. In 2242, the Terran First Fleet returns from the pocket universe with advanced technology and a mission to liberate Earth. The three missions of the campaign detail the fleet's efforts to liberate Arcea, deal with the Thalan, and finally dismantle the Drengin presence in the Sol system before bringing down the Precursor shield. The lifting of the shield allows the massively rebuilt Terran Alliance fleet into the galaxy, thus beginning the "Terran Crusade" the Thalan had previously warned about.

== Reception ==
Reception

Aggregate score
Aggregator	Score
Metacritic	81/100

Review scores
Publication	Score
GameSpot	8/10
IGN	8.6/10
PC Gamer (US)	87 out of 100

Galactic Civilizations III received generally positive reviews from critics. Aggregating review website Metacritic gave the game 81/100. Richard Cobbet for PC Gamer said that the game was "easily the best recent 4X of this scale".
