= List of Civilization media =

Franchise of video games and media

Civilization is a franchise composed primarily of a series of turn-based strategy video games and associated media. The core of the franchise is a series of six titles for personal computers, released between 1991 and 2016. Sid Meier developed the first game in the series and has had creative input for most of its sequels. The official titles of the series, core games, and most spin-offs include his name, as in Sid Meier's Civilization. In addition to the main titles, the franchise includes multiple expansion packs and spin-off games, as well as board games inspired by the video game series. The series is considered a formulative example of the 4X genre, in which players achieve victory through four routes: "eXplore, eXpand, eXploit, and eXterminate".

The first game in the series, Civilization (1991), was created by MicroProse co-founder Meier and Bruce Shelley. MicroProse continued the series for several years, producing Civilization II (1996) as well as a spin-off title, Sid Meier's Colonization (1994). Business changes after the consolidation of the company in 1996 with Spectrum HoloByte, which bought MicroProse in 1993, resulted in Meier leaving the company to found Firaxis Games in 1996. Firaxis created a spin-off title, Sid Meier's Alpha Centauri (1999), but did not have the rights to the "Civilization" name. MicroProse did not produce any further games in the series beyond licensing the name to Activision for the spin-off Civilization: Call to Power (1999) before being purchased by Hasbro Interactive in 1998. Hasbro Interactive, along with the "Civilization" brand, was in turn purchased by Infogrames in 2001, who licensed the name to Firaxis for Civilization III (2001). The rights to the franchise were sold in 2004, however, to Take-Two Interactive, which licensed it to Firaxis again for Civilization IV (2005) just before acquiring Firaxis itself in 2005. Firaxis has since served as the primary developer and Take-Two the sole publisher for the franchise, producing main-series games Civilization V (2010) and Civilization VI (2016) along with seven spin-off titles, including console and mobile versions of the franchise in Civilization Revolution (2008) and titles such as Civilization: Beyond Earth (2014).

In addition to video games, the franchise includes several board games, artbooks, and music albums. The first board game, Civilization: The Boardgame (2002), corresponds with Civilization III, while the second game by that name (2010) is based on Civilization IV, and the latest, Civilization: A New Dawn (2017), is based on Civilization VI. A card game, created by Civilization IV lead designer Soren Johnson and based on that game, was included with the Civilization Chronicles (2006) compilation. Books containing concept art and commentary for Civilization V and VI have been included in special editions of the game. Music CDs were included with the special editions of Civilization IV and V; digital albums have been sold for Civilization VI and its expansion, as well as for Civilization: Beyond Earth and its expansions. The Grammy Award for Best Arrangement, Instrumental and Vocals-winning theme song for IV, "Baba Yetu", was included in composer Christopher Tin's album Calling All Dawns, while the theme song for VI, "Sogno di Volare", has been released as a single by Tin and included in his album To Shiver the Sky.

== Video games ==
=== Main series ===
Main series games
Game	Details
Sid Meier's Civilization Original release date: September 1991	Release years by system: 1991 – PC (MS-DOS); 1992 – PC (Amiga); 1993 – PC (Mac OS); 1994 – Super Nintendo Entertainment System; 1995 – PC (Windows); 1996 – PlayStation; 1997 – Sega Saturn
Sid Meier's Civilization Original release date: September 1991	Notes: Developed and published by MicroProse; CivNet (1995), a version of Civilization with multiplayer gameplay and a map editor, released by MicroProse in 1995; Included in The Explorer (1997) and Sid Meier's Civilization Chronicles (2006) compilations
Sid Meier's Civilization II Original release date: February 29, 1996	Release years by system: 1996 – PC (Windows); 1997 – PC (Mac OS); 1998 – PlayStation
Sid Meier's Civilization II Original release date: February 29, 1996	Notes: Developed and published by MicroProse; Two expansion packs, Sid Meier's Civilization II: Conflicts in Civilization (1996) and Civ II: Fantastic Worlds (1997), developed and published by MicroProse; Sid Meier's Civilization II: Multiplayer Gold Edition (1997) includes the original game and both expansion packs along with added multiplayer functionality and other changes; Sid Meier's Civilization II: Test of Time (1999) includes an expanded version of the original game with the multiplayer changes from the Multiplayer Gold Edition along with science fiction and fantasy campaigns for the game titled Lalande 21185 and Midgard; Included in the Sid Meier's Civilization Chronicles (2006) compilation along with expansions
Sid Meier's Civilization III Original release date: October 31, 2001	Release years by system: 2001 – PC (Windows); 2002 – PC (Mac OS)
Sid Meier's Civilization III Original release date: October 31, 2001	Notes: Developed by Firaxis Games and published by Infogrames; Two expansion packs, Sid Meier's Civilization III: Play the World (2002) and Sid Meier's Civilization III: Conquests (2003), developed by Firaxis and published by Infogrames (Conquests as Atari); Sid Meier's Civilization III: Gold Edition (2003) includes the original game and Play the World; Sid Meier's Civilization III: Complete (2004) includes the original game and both expansion packs; Included in the Sid Meier's Civilization Chronicles (2006) compilation along with expansions
Sid Meier's Civilization IV Original release date: October 25, 2005	Release years by system: 2005 – PC (Windows); 2006 – PC (macOS)
Sid Meier's Civilization IV Original release date: October 25, 2005	Notes: Developed by Firaxis Games and published by 2K Games; Two expansion packs, Sid Meier's Civilization IV: Warlords (2006) and Sid Meier's Civilization IV: Beyond the Sword (2007), developed by Firaxis and published by 2K Games; Sid Meier's Civilization IV: Gold Edition (2007) includes the original game and Warlords; Sid Meier's Civilization IV: Complete (2007) includes the original game and both expansion packs; Included without expansions in the Sid Meier's Civilization Chronicles (2006) compilation and with expansions in Sid Meier's Civilization IV: The Complete Edition (2009) compilation
Sid Meier's Civilization V Original release date: September 21, 2010	Release years by system: 2010 – PC (Windows, macOS); 2014 – PC (Linux)
Sid Meier's Civilization V Original release date: September 21, 2010	Notes: Developed by Firaxis Games and published by 2K Games; Two expansion packs, Sid Meier's Civilization V: Gods & Kings (2012) and Sid Meier's Civilization V: Brave New World (2013), developed by Firaxis and published by 2K Games; additional downloadable content (DLC) also released; Sid Meier's Civilization V: Game of the Year Edition (2011) includes the original game and all DLC released to date; Sid Meier's Civilization V: Gold (2013) includes the original game, Gods & Kings, and all DLC; Sid Meier's Civilization V: The Complete Edition (2014) includes the original game, both expansion packs, and all DLC
Sid Meier's Civilization VI Original release date: October 21, 2016	Release years by system: 2016 – PC (Windows, macOS); 2017 – PC (Linux), iOS; 2018 – Nintendo Switch; 2019 – PlayStation 4, Xbox One; 2020 – Android
Sid Meier's Civilization VI Original release date: October 21, 2016	Notes: Developed by Firaxis Games and published by 2K Games; Two expansion packs, Sid Meier's Civilization VI: Rise and Fall (2018) and Sid Meier's Civilization VI: Gathering Storm (2019), developed by Firaxis and published by 2K Games; additional DLC also released
Sid Meier's Civilization VII Proposed release date: February 11, 2025	Proposed system release: 2025 – PC (Windows, macOS, Linux), Nintendo Switch, PlayStation 4, PlayStation 5, Xbox One, Xbox Series X/S
Sid Meier's Civilization VII Proposed release date: February 11, 2025	Notes: Developed by Firaxis Games and to be published by 2K Games

=== Other games ===
Other games
Game	Details
Sid Meier's Colonization Original release date: May 19, 1994	Release years by system: 1994 – PC (Windows)
Sid Meier's Colonization Original release date: May 19, 1994	Notes: Turn-based strategy game; Developed and published by MicroProse; Spin-off of the original Civilization using the same base game; Included in The Explorer (1997) compilation
Sid Meier's Alpha Centauri Original release date: February 12, 1999	Release years by system: 1999 – PC (Windows); 2000 – PC (Mac OS, Linux)
Sid Meier's Alpha Centauri Original release date: February 12, 1999	Notes: 4X turn-based strategy game; Developed by Firaxis Games and published by Electronic Arts; Spiritual sequel to the Civilization series; An expansion pack, Sid Meier's Alien Crossfire (1999), developed by Firaxis and published by Electronic Arts; Both Alpha Centauri and Alien Crossfire included in the Alpha Centauri Planetary Pack (2000) and The Laptop Collection (2003) compilations
Civilization: Call to Power Original release date: March 31, 1999	Release years by system: 1999 – PC (Windows, Mac OS, Linux)
Civilization: Call to Power Original release date: March 31, 1999	Notes: 4X turn-based strategy game; Developed and published by Activision; Spin-off successor to Civilization series; developed by Activision due to naming rights dispute between Microprose and Avalon Hill
Call to Power II Original release date: November 20, 2000	Release years by system: 2000 – PC (Windows)
Call to Power II Original release date: November 20, 2000	Notes: 4X turn-based strategy game; Developed and published by Activision; Sequel to Civilization: Call to Power; "Civilization" removed from title due to the loss of rights to the name
Civilization Original release date: March 2, 2006	Release years by system: 2006 – N-Gage
Civilization Original release date: March 2, 2006	Notes: 4X turn-based strategy game; Developed by Gryphondale Studios and published by Atari SA; Based on Civilization II and III
CivCity: Rome Original release date: July 25, 2006	Release years by system: 2006 – PC (Windows)
CivCity: Rome Original release date: July 25, 2006	Notes: City-building game; Developed by Firaxis Games and Firefly Studios; published by 2K Games
Sid Meier's Civilization Revolution Original release date: June 6, 2008	Release years by system: 2008 – PlayStation 3, Xbox 360, Nintendo DS; 2009 – iOS; 2012 – Windows Phone
Sid Meier's Civilization Revolution Original release date: June 6, 2008	Notes: 4X turn-based strategy game; Developed by Firaxis Games and published by 2K Games
Sid Meier's Civilization IV: Colonization Original release date: September 21, 2008	Release years by system: 2008 – PC (Windows); 2009 – PC (macOS)
Sid Meier's Civilization IV: Colonization Original release date: September 21, 2008	Notes: 4X turn-based strategy game; Developed by Firaxis Games and published by 2K Games; Remake of Sid Meier's Colonization (1994); Included in the Sid Meier's Civilization IV: The Complete Edition (2009) compilation
Sid Meier's Civilization World Original release date: July 7, 2011	Release years by system: 2011 – PC (Facebook Platform)
Sid Meier's Civilization World Original release date: July 7, 2011	Notes: Massively multiplayer online real-time strategy game; Developed by Firaxis Games and published by 2K Games; Also known as CivWorld; named Civilization Network prior to launch; Shut down on May 29, 2013
Sid Meier's Civilization Revolution 2 Original release date: July 2, 2014	Release years by system: 2014 – Android, iOS; 2015 – PlayStation Vita
Sid Meier's Civilization Revolution 2 Original release date: July 2, 2014	Notes: 4X turn-based strategy game; Developed by Firaxis Games and published by 2K Games; PlayStation Vita release is an expanded version titled Sid Meier's Civilization Revolution 2 Plus
Sid Meier's Civilization: Beyond Earth Original release date: October 24, 2014	Release years by system: 2014 – PC (Windows, macOS, Linux)
Sid Meier's Civilization: Beyond Earth Original release date: October 24, 2014	Notes: 4X turn-based strategy game; Developed by Firaxis Games and published by 2K Games; One expansion pack, Sid Meier's Civilization: Beyond Earth – Rising Tide (2015), developed by Firaxis and published by 2K Games
Sid Meier's Starships Original release date: March 12, 2015	Release years by system: 2015 – PC (Windows, macOS), iOS
Sid Meier's Starships Original release date: March 12, 2015	Notes: 4X turn-based strategy game; Developed by Firaxis Games and published by 2K Games; Features cross-connectivity features with Civilization: Beyond Earth
Civilization: Eras and Allies Proposed release date: TBA	Proposed system release: TBA – iOS, Android
Civilization: Eras and Allies Proposed release date: TBA	Notes: 4X turn-based strategy game; Published by 2K Games; Created and soft launched in 2023 as Conquests and Alliances - 4X Empire Builder; rebranded as Civilization: Eras and Allies on December 6, 2023

== Tabletop games ==
Tabletop games
Title	Release date	Type	Ref.
Sid Meier's Civilization: The Boardgame	2002	Board game	
Created by Glenn Drover and published by Eagle Games; Based on Civilization III
Sid Meier's Civilization: The Card Game	2006	Card game	
Created by Civilization IV lead designer Soren Johnson and published by Firaxis Games; Included solely in the Civilization Chronicles (2006) compilation; Based on Civilization IV
Sid Meier's Civilization: The Board Game	2010	Board game	
Created by Kevin Wilson and published by Fantasy Flight Games; Based on Civilization IV; Two expansions produced: Sid Meier's Civilization: Fame and Fortune (2011) and Sid Meier's Civilization: Wisdom and Warfare (2013)
Sid Meier's Civilization: A New Dawn	2017	Board game	
Created by James Kniffen and published by Fantasy Flight Games; Based on Civilization VI

== Books ==
Books
Title	Release date	Media type	Ref.
Alpha Centauri: Power of the Mindworms	January 13, 2000	Graphic novel	
Written by Steve Darnall, illustrated by Rafael Kayanan and published by NBM Publishing Company; Depicts events early in a game of Sid Meier's Alpha Centauri; 48 pages; ISBN 978-1-56163-242-8
Centauri Dawn / Dragon Sun / Twilight of the Mind	November 28, 2000 / August 28, 2001 / January 29, 2002	Books	
Written by Alpha Centauri's story developer Michael Ely and published by Simon & Schuster; Novelization trilogy of Alpha Centauri; 304 / 277 / 288 pages; ISBN 978-0-671-04077-2 / ISBN 978-0-671-04078-9 / ISBN 978-0-671-04079-6
GURPS Alpha Centauri	December 15, 2002	Sourcebook	
Written by Jon F. Zeigler and published by Steve Jackson Games; Rulebook for using the Alpha Centauri setting in the GURPS role-playing system; 128 pages; ISBN 978-1-55634-520-3
The Chronicles of Civilization	October 25, 2006	Book	
Published by 2K Games; Interviews and concept art; 96 pages; Included with the Civilization Chronicles compilation
Sid Meier's Civilization V: The Art of The Game	September 21, 2010	Concept art	
Published by 2K Games; Concept art and commentary on Civilization V; 162 pages; Included with the "Special Edition" of the game
Sid Meier's Civilization: Civilization Through the Years	October 21, 2016	Concept art	
Published by 2K Games; Concept art and commentary on the series; 100 pages; Included with the "25th Anniversary Edition" of Civilization VI

== Music ==
Music
Title	Release date	Release type	Ref.
Sid Meier's Civilization IV Official Soundtrack	October 24, 2005	Album	
Composed primarily by Jeff Briggs and Christopher Tin for Civilization IV; Published by Take-Two Interactive; included solely with the special edition of the game; 18 tracks on a single disc with a duration of 1:09:48; The theme song, "Baba Yetu", won a Grammy Award for Best Arrangement, Instrumental and Vocals and was included in Tin's album Calling All Dawns
Sid Meier's Civilization V Official Soundtrack	September 21, 2010	Album	
Composed primarily by Geoff Knorr and Michael Curran for Civilization V; Published by 2K Games; included solely with the special edition of the game; 33 tracks on two discs with a duration of 2:37:14
Sid Meier's Civilization: Beyond Earth	October 24, 2014	Album	
Composed primarily by Geoff Knorr for Civilization: Beyond Earth; Published by 2K Games as a digital album; 42 tracks with a duration of 2:47:22
Sid Meier's Civilization: Beyond Earth – Rising Tide	September 29, 2015	Album	
Composed primarily by Geoff Knorr for Civilization: Beyond Earth – Rising Tide; Published by 2K Games as a digital album; 29 tracks with a duration of 2:03:05
Sogno di Volare (Civilization VI Main Theme)	October 20, 2016	Single	
Composed by Christopher Tin for Civilization VI; Published by Tin Works Publishing as a digital single; Contains full version of the song and shortened version used in game intro, with a duration of 6:38; Included in Tin's album To Shiver the Sky (2019)
Sid Meier's Civilization VI Original Game Soundtrack	October 21, 2016	Album	
Composed primarily by Geoff Knorr for Civilization VI; Published by 2K Games as a digital album; 38 tracks with a duration of 2:24:09; Expanded version titled Sid Meier's Civilization 25th Anniversary Soundtrack included with Digital Deluxe Edition and 25th Anniversary Editions of the game
Sid Meier's Civilization VI: Rise & Fall Original Game Soundtrack	February 8, 2018	Album	
Composed primarily by Geoff Knorr and Roland Rizzo for Civilization VI: Rise and Fall; Published by 2K Games as a digital album; 33 tracks with a duration of 2:14:40
Sid Meier's Civilization VI: Gathering Storm Original Game Soundtrack	February 14, 2019	Album	
Composed primarily by Geoff Knorr and Roland Rizzo for Civilization VI: Gathering Storm; Published by 2K Games as a digital album; 33 tracks with a duration of 1:57:00
Sid Meier's Civilization VII: Original Game Soundtrack	February 11, 2025	Album	
Composed primarily by Geoff Knorr and Roland Rizzo for Civilization VII; Published by 2K Games as a digital album; 45 tracks with a duration of 3:41:00; Released on four vinyl discs by Laced Records in 2025
