= Civilization (disambiguation) =

A civilization or civilisation is a complex society.

Civilization(s) or Civilisation(s) may also refer to these media:

== Film and television ==
- Civilization (film), a 1916 pacifist drama
- Civilisation (TV series), a 1969 BBC art history docuseries
  - Civilisations (TV series), a 2018 BBC/PBS sequel
- "Civilization" (Star Trek: Enterprise), a 2001 sci-fi episode
- Civilization: Is the West History?, a 2011 docuseries by Channel 4

== Games ==
- Civilization (1980 board game), by Francis Tresham
- Civilization (series), video games by Sid Meier
  - Civilization (video game), 1991
  - Civilization (2002 board game), by Glenn Drover
  - Civilization: The Card Game, 2006
  - Civilization (2010 board game), by Kevin Wilson

== Literature ==
- Civilization (novel), a 1994 novel by Paul Quarrington
- Civilization: How We All Became American, a 2017 book by Régis Debray
- Civilizations (novel), a 2019 novel by Laurent Binet
- Civilization (magazine), magazine founded in 2018

== Music ==
- Civilization (Front Line Assembly album), 2004
- Civilization (Tony Williams album), 1987
- Civilisation, a series of EPs by Kero Kero Bonito:
  - Civilisation I, 2019
  - Civilisation II, 2021
- "Civilization" (Bob Hilliard and Carl Sigman song), 1947
- "Civilization" (Justice song), 2011

== See also ==
- Community, a social unit
- Complex society, a theorized stage of social development
- Society
- Advanced Civilization, a 1991 board game expansion
- Civilized (album), by Stellastarr
- Uncivilised (film), a 1936 Australian film
- Uncivilised (novel), a 1936 novel by E. V. Timms
