= Sid Meier's Civilization board game =

Sid Meier's Civilization board game may refer to

- Civilization: The Boardgame, a 2002 board game by Glenn Drover, an adaptation of the computer game Civilization III
- Civilization: The Board Game, a 2010 board game by Kevin Wilson, an adaptation of the computer game Civilization IV
