= Civilization (video game) =

1991 video game

Sid Meier's Civilization
- Box art by Sally Vitsky
- Developer: MicroProse
- Publishers: MicroProse: Super NES; JP: Asmik Ace; NA: Koei PS1, Saturn; JP: Asmik Ace
- Producer: Sid Meier
- Designers: Sid Meier; Bruce Shelley
- Programmer: Sid Meier
- Writers: B. C. Milligan; Jeffery L. Briggs; Bruce Shelley
- Composer: Jeffery L. Briggs
- Series: Civilization
- Platforms: MS-DOS; Amiga; PC-98; Atari ST; Windows; Macintosh; Super NES; Sony PlayStation; Sega Saturn
- Release: September 1991
- Genre: Turn-based strategy
- Mode: Single-player

Sid Meier's Civilization is a 1991 turn-based strategy 4X video game developed and published by MicroProse. The game was originally developed for MS-DOS running on a PC, and it has undergone numerous revisions for various platforms. The player is tasked with leading an entire human civilization over the course of several millennia by controlling various areas such as urban development, exploration, government, trade, research, and military. The player can control individual units and advance the exploration, conquest and settlement of the game's world. The player can also make such decisions as setting forms of government, tax rates and research priorities. The player's civilization is in competition with other computer-controlled civilizations, with which the player can enter diplomatic relationships that can either end in alliances or lead to war.

Civilization was designed by Sid Meier and Bruce Shelley following the successes of Silent Service, Sid Meier's Pirates! and Railroad Tycoon. Civilization has sold 1.5 million copies since its release and is considered one of the most influential computer games in history due to its establishment of the 4X genre. In addition to its commercial and critical success, the game has been deemed pedagogically valuable due to its presentation of historical relationships, and one of the greatest video games ever made by several publications. A multiplayer remake, Sid Meier's CivNet, was released for the PC in 1995. Civilization was followed by several sequels starting with Civilization II, with similar or modified scenarios.

== Gameplay ==
A world map screenshot from the Amiga version of Civilization

Civilization is a turn-based single-player strategy game. The player takes on the role of the ruler of a civilization, starting with one (or occasionally two) settler units, and attempts to build an empire in competition with two to seven other civilizations. The following civilizations appear in the game: Americans, Aztecs, Babylonians, Chinese, Egyptians, English, French, Germans, Greeks, Indians, Mongols, Romans, Russians and Zulus.

The game requires a fair amount of micromanagement (although less than other simulation games). Along with the larger tasks of exploration, warfare and diplomacy, the player has to make decisions about where to build new cities, which improvements or units to build in each city, which advances in knowledge should be sought (and at what rate), and how to transform the land surrounding the cities for maximum benefit. From time to time the player's towns may be harassed by barbarians, units with no specific nationality and no named leader. These threats only come from huts, unclaimed land or sea, so that over time and turns of exploration, there are fewer and fewer places from which barbarians will emanate.

Before the game begins, the player chooses which historical or current civilization to play. In contrast to later games in the Civilization series, this is largely a cosmetic choice, affecting titles, city names, musical heralds, and color. The choice does affect their starting position on the "Play on Earth" map, and thus different resources in one's initial cities, but has no effect on starting position when starting a random world game or a customized world game. The player's choice of civilization also prevents the computer from being able to play as that civilization or the other civilization of the same color, and since computer-controlled opponents display certain traits of their civilizations this affects gameplay as well. The Aztecs are both fiercely expansionist and generally extremely wealthy, for example. Other civilizations include the Americans, the Mongols, and Romans. Each civilization is led by a famous historical figure, such as Mahatma Gandhi for India.

The scope of Civilization is larger than most other games. The game begins in 4000 BC, before the Bronze Age, and can last through to AD 2100 (on the easiest setting) with Space Age and "future technologies". At the start of the game there are no cities anywhere in the world: the player controls one or two settler units, which can be used to found new cities in appropriate sites (and those cities may build other settler units, which can go out and found new cities, thus expanding the empire). Settlers can also alter terrain, build improvements such as mines and irrigation, build roads to connect cities, and later in the game they can construct railroads which offer unlimited movement.

As time advances, new technologies are developed; these technologies are the primary way in which the game changes and grows. At the start, players choose from advances such as pottery, the wheel, and the alphabet to, near the end of the game, nuclear fission and spaceflight. Players can gain a large advantage if their civilization is the first to learn a particular technology (the secrets of flight, for example) and put it to use in a military or other context. Most advances give access to new units, city improvements or derivative technologies: for example, the chariot unit becomes available after the wheel is developed, and the granary building becomes available to build after pottery is developed. The whole system of advancements from beginning to end is called the technology tree, or simply the Tech tree; this concept has been adopted in many other strategy games. Since only one tech may be "researched" at any given time, the order in which technologies are chosen makes a considerable difference in the outcome of the game and generally reflects the player's preferred style of gameplay.

Players can also build Wonders of the World in each of the epochs of the game, subject only to obtaining the prerequisite knowledge. These wonders are important achievements of society, science, culture and defense, ranging from the Pyramids and the Great Wall in the Ancient age, to Copernicus' Observatory and Magellan's Expedition in the middle period, up to the Apollo program, the United Nations, and the Manhattan Project in the modern era. Each wonder can only be built once in the world, and requires a lot of resources to build, far more than most other city buildings or units. Wonders provide unique benefits to the controlling civilization. For example, Magellan's Expedition increases the movement rate of naval units. Wonders typically affect either the city in which they are built (for example, the Colossus), every city on the continent (for example, J.S. Bach's Cathedral), or the civilization as a whole (for example, Darwin's Voyage). Some wonders are made obsolete by new technologies.

The game can be won by conquering all other civilizations or by winning the space race by reaching the star system of Alpha Centauri.

== Development ==
=== Prior Civilization-named games ===
British designer Francis Tresham released his Civilization board game in 1980 under his company Hartland Trefoil. Avalon Hill had obtained the rights to publish it in the United States in 1981.

There were at least two attempts to make a computerized version of Tresham's game prior to 1990. Danielle Bunten Berry planned to start work on the game after completing M.U.L.E. in 1983, and again in 1985, after completing The Seven Cities of Gold at Electronic Arts. In 1983 Bunten and producer Joe Ybarra opted to first do Seven Cities of Gold. The success of Seven Cities in 1985 in turn led to a sequel, Heart of Africa. Bunten never returned to the idea of Civilization. Don Daglow, designer of Utopia, the first simulation game, began work programming a version of Civilization in 1987. He dropped the project, however, when he was offered an executive position at Broderbund, and never returned to the game.

=== Development at MicroProse ===
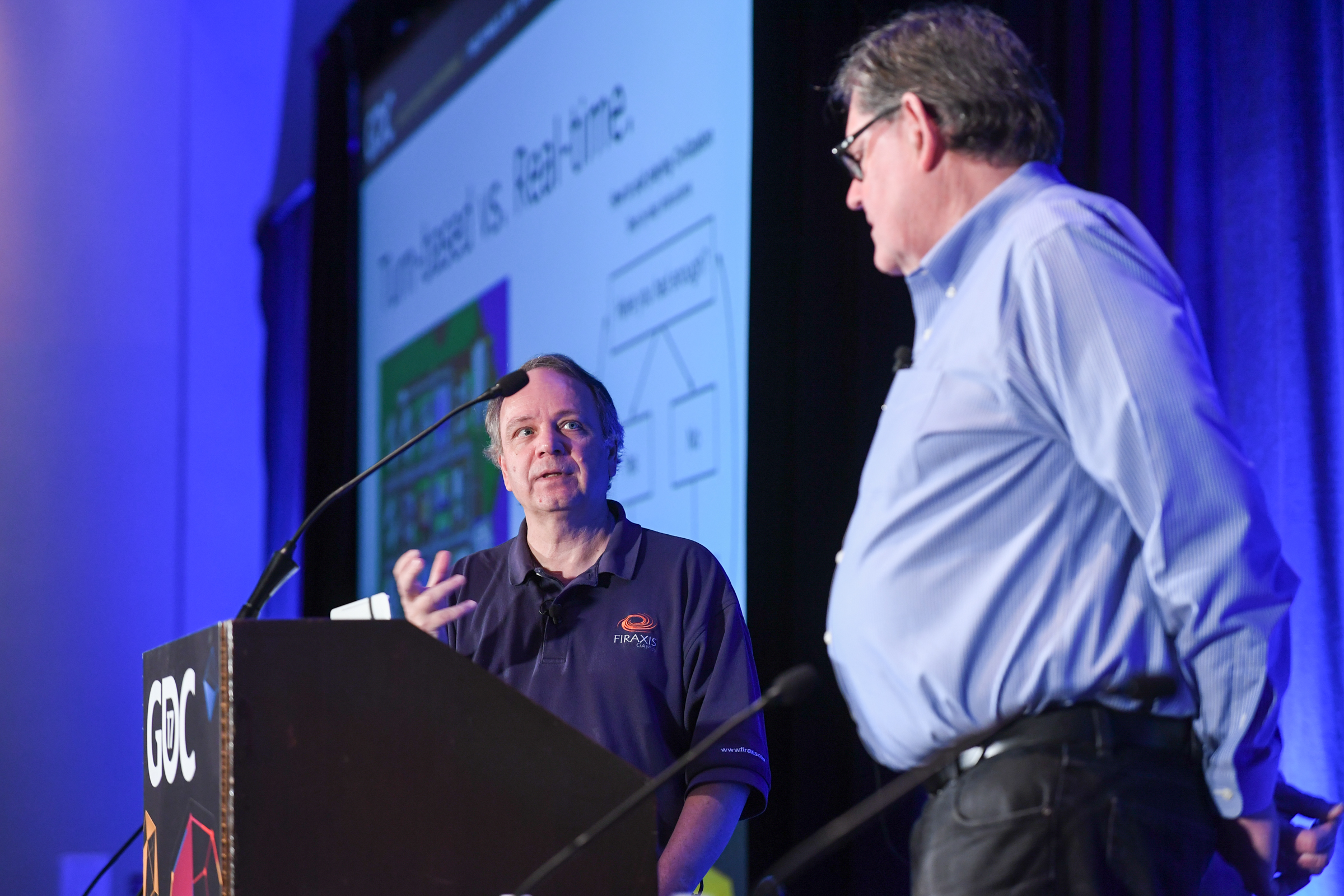
Sid Meier (left) and Bruce Shelley at the 2017 Game Developers Conference

Sid Meier and Bill Stealey co-founded MicroProse in 1982 to develop flight simulators and other military strategy video games based on Stealey's past experiences as a United States Air Force pilot. Around 1989, Meier wanted to expand his repertoire beyond these types of games, as just having finished F-19 Stealth Fighter (1988, 1990), he said "Everything I thought was cool about a flight simulator had gone into that game." He took to heart the success of the new god game genre, in particular SimCity (1989) and Populous (1989). Specifically with SimCity, Meier recognized that video games could still be entertaining based on building something up. By then, Meier was not an official employee of MicroProse but worked under contract where the company paid him upfront for game development, a large payment on delivery of the game, and additional royalties on each game of his sold.

MicroProse had hired a number of Avalon Hill game designers, including Bruce Shelley. Among other works, Shelley had been responsible for adapting the railroad-based 1829 board game developed by Tresham into 1830: The Game of Railroads and Robber Barons. Shelley had joined MicroProse finding that the board game market was weakening in contrast to the video game market, and initially worked on F-19 Stealth Fighter. Meier recognized Shelley's abilities and background in game design and took him on as personal assistant designer to brainstorm new game ideas. The two initially worked on ideas for Covert Action, but had put these aside when they came up with the concepts for Railroad Tycoon (1990), based loosely on the 1829/1830 board games. Railroad Tycoon was generally well received at its release, but the title did not fit within the nature of flight simulators and military strategy from MicroProse's previous catalog. Meier and Shelley had started a sequel to Railroad Tycoon shortly after its release, but Stealey canceled the project.

One positive aspect both had taken from Railroad Tycoon was the idea of multiple smaller systems working together at the same time and the player having to manage them. Both Meier and Shelley recognized that the complex interactions between these systems led players to "make a lot of interesting decisions", and that ruling a whole civilization would readily work well with these underlying systems. Some time later, both discussed their love of the original Empire computer games, and Meier challenged Shelley to give him ten things he would change about Empire; Shelley provided him with twelve. Around May 1990, Meier presented Shelley with a 5-1/4" floppy disk which contained the first prototype of Civilization based on their past discussions and Shelley's list.

Meier described his development process as sculpting with clay. His prototype took elements from Empire, Railroad Tycoon, SimCity and the Civilization board game. This initial version of this game was a real-time simulation, with the player defining zones for their population to grow similar to zoning in SimCity. Meier and Shelley went back and forth with this, with Shelley providing suggestions based on his playthrough and acting as the game's producer, and Meier coding and reworking the game to address these points, and otherwise without involvement of other MicroProse staff. During this period, Stealey and the other managers became concerned that this game did not fit MicroProse's general catalog as strategy computer games had not yet proven successful. A few months into the development, Stealey requested them to put the project on hold and complete Covert Action, after which they could go back to their new game. Meier and Shelley completed Covert Action which was published in 1990.

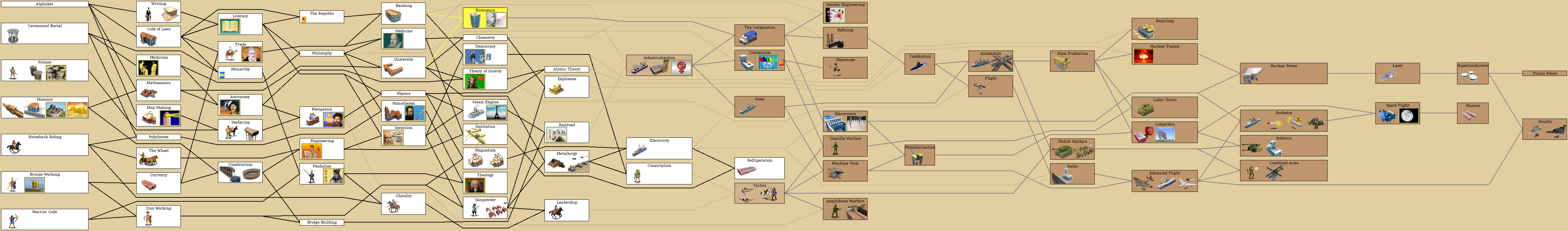
Meier introduced a technology tree in Civilization, similar to this one from the open-source variation, Freeciv, to create non-linear ways to play the game.

Once Covert Action was released, Meier and Shelley returned to the prototype. The time away from the project allowed them to recognize that the real-time aspect was not working well, and reworked the game to become turn-based and dropped the zoning aspect, a change that Meier described as "like tossing the clay in the trash and getting a new lump". They incorporated elements of city management and military aspect from Empire, including creating individual military units as well as settler units that replaced the functionality of the zoning approach. Meier felt adding military and combat to the game was necessary: "The game really isn't about being civilized. The competition is what makes the game fun and the players play their best. At times, you have to make the player uncomfortable for the good of the player." Meier also opted to include a technology tree that would help to open the game to many more choices to the player as it continued, creating a non-linear experience. Meier felt players would be able to use the technology tree to adopt a style of play and from which they could use technologies to barter with the other opponents. While the game relies on established recorded history, Meier admitted he did not spend much time in research, usually only to assure the proper chronology or spellings; Shelley noted that they wanted to design for fun, not accuracy, and that "Everything we needed was pretty much available in the children’s section of the library."

Computer Gaming World reported in 1994 that "Sid Meier has stated on numerous occasions that he emphasizes the 'fun parts' of a simulation and throws out the rest". Meier described the process as "Add another bit [of clay]—no, that went too far. Scrape it off". He eliminated the potential for any civilization to fall on its own, believing this would be punishing to the player. "Though historically accurate", Meier said, "The moment the Krakatoa volcano blew up, or the bubonic plague came marching through, all anybody wanted to do was reload from a saved game". Meier omitted multiplayer alliances because the computer used them too effectively, causing players to think that it was cheating. He said that by contrast, minefields and minesweepers caused the computer to do "stupid things ... If you've got a feature that makes the AI look stupid, take it out. It's more important not to have stupid AI than to have good AI". Meier also omitted jets and helicopters because he thought players would not find obtaining new technologies in the endgame useful, and online multiplayer support because of the small number of online players ("if you had friends, you wouldn't need to play computer games"); he also did not believe that online play worked well with turn-based play. The game was developed for the IBM PC platform, which at the time had support for both 16-color EGA to 256-color VGA; Meier opted to support both 16-color and 256-color graphics to allow the game to run on both EGA/Tandy and VGA/MCGA systems.

"I’ve never been able to decide if it was a mistake to keep Civ isolated as long as I did", Meier wrote; while "as many eyes as possible" are beneficial during development, Meier and Shelley worked very quickly together, combining the roles of playtester, game designer, and programmer. Meier and Shelley neared the end of their development and started presenting the game to the rest of MicroProse for feedback towards publication. This process was slowed by the current vice president of development, who had taken over Meier's former position at the company. This vice president did not receive any financial bonuses for successful publication of Meier's games due to Meier's contract terms, forgoing any incentive to provide the needed resources to finish the game. The management had also expressed issue with the lack of a firm completion date, as according to Shelley, Meier would consider a game completed only when he felt he had completed it. Eventually the two got the required help for publication, with Shelley overseeing these processes and Meier making the necessary coding changes.

"One of my big rules has always been, 'double it, or cut it in half'", Meier wrote. He cut the map's size in half less than a month before Civilization's release after playtesting revealed that the previous size was too large and made for boring and repetitive gameplay. Other automated features, like city management, were modified to require more player involvement. They also eliminated a secondary branch of the technology tree with minor skills like beer brewing, and spent time reworking the existing technologies and units to make sure they felt appropriate and did not break the game. Most of the game was originally developed with art crafted by Meier, and MicroProse's art department helped to create most of the final assets, though some of Meier's original art was used. Shelley wrote out the "Civilopedia" entries for all the elements of the game and the game's large manual.

External videos
- Interview with Sid Meier on the development of Civilization, from Ars Technica in 2019

The name Civilization came late in the development process. MicroProse recognized at this point the 1980 Civilization board game may conflict with their video game, as it shared a similar theme including the technology tree. Meier had noted the board game's influence but considered it not as great as Empire or SimCity, while others have noted significant differences that made the video game far different from the board game such as the non-linearity introduced by Meier's technology tree. To avoid any potential legal issues, MicroProse negotiated a license to use the Civilization name from Avalon Hill. The addition of Meier's name to the title was from a current practice established by Stealey to attach games like Civilization that diverged from MicroProse's past catalog to Meier's name, so that players that played Meier's combat simulators and recognized Meier's name would give these new games a try. This approach worked, according to Meier, and he would continue this naming scheme for other titles in the future as a type of branding.

By the time the game was completed and ready for release, Meier estimated that it had cost $170,000 (equivalent to $391,544 in 2024) in development. Civilization was released in September 1991. Because of the animosity that MicroProse's management had towards Meier's games, there was very little promotion of the title, though interest in the game through word-of-mouth helped to boost sales. Following the release on the IBM PC, the game was ported to other platforms; Meier and Shelley provided this code to contractors hired by MicroProse to complete the ports.

=== CivNet ===
Civilization was released with only single-player support, with the player working against multiple computer opponents. In 1991, Internet or online gaming was still in its infancy, so this option was not considered in Civilization's release. Over the next few years, as home Internet accessibility took off, MicroProse looked to develop an online version of Civilization. This led to the 1995 release of Sid Meier's CivNet. CivNet allowed for up to seven players to play the game, with computer opponents available to obtain up to six active civilizations. Games could be played either on a turn-based mode, or in a simultaneous mode where each player took their turn at the same time and only progressing to the next turn once all players have confirmed being finished that turn. The game, in addition to better support for Windows 3.1 and Windows 95, supported connectivity through LAN, primitive Internet play, modem, and direct serial link, and included a local hotseat mode. CivNet also included a map editor and a "king builder" to allow a player to customize the names and looks of their civilization as seen by other players.

According to Brian Reynolds, who led the development of Civilization II, MicroProse "sincerely believed that CivNet was going to be a much more important product" than the next single-player Civilization game that he and Jeff Briggs had started working on. Reynolds said that because their project was seen as a side effort with little risk, they were able to innovate new ideas into Civilization II. As a net result, CivNet was generally overshadowed by Civilization II which was released in the following year.

=== Post-release ===
Civilization's critical success created a "golden period of MicroProse" where there was more potential for similar strategy games to succeed, according to Meier. This put stress on the company's direction and culture. Stealey wanted to continue to pursue the military-themed titles, while Meier wanted to continue his success with simulation games. Shelley left MicroProse in 1992 and joined Ensemble Studios, where he used his experience with Civilization to design the Age of Empires games. Stealey had pushed MicroProse to develop console and arcade-based versions of their games, but this put the company into debt, and Stealey eventually sold the company to Spectrum HoloByte in 1993; Spectrum HoloByte kept MicroProse as a separate company on acquisition.

Meier would continue and develop Civilization II along with Brian Reynolds, who served in a similar role to Shelley as design assistant, as well as help from Jeff Briggs and Douglas Kaufman. This game was released in early 1996, and is considered the first sequel of any Sid Meier game. Stealey eventually sold his shares in MicroProse and left the company, and Spectrum HoloByte opted to consolidate the two companies under the name MicroProse in 1996, eliminating numerous positions at MicroProse in the process. As a result, Meier, Briggs, and Reynolds all opted to leave the company and founded Firaxis, which by 2005 became a subsidiary of Take-Two. After a number of acquisitions and legal actions, the Civilization brand (both as a board game and video game) is now owned by Take-Two, and Firaxis, under Meier's oversight, continues to develop games in the Civilization series.

== Reception ==
Reception

Review scores
Publication	Score
AllGame	5/5
Game Informer	8.5/10 (SNES)
Next Generation	4/5 (SNES)

Civilization has been called one of the most important strategy games of all time, and has a loyal following of fans. This high level of interest has led to the creation of a number of free and open source versions and inspired similar games by other commercial developers.

Computer Gaming World stated that "a new Olympian in the genre of god games has truly emerged", comparing Civilization's importance to computer games to that of the wheel. The game was reviewed in 1992 in Dragon #183 by Hartley, Patricia, and Kirk Lesser in "The Role of Computers" column. The reviewers gave the game 5 out of 5 stars and commented that: "Civilization is one of the highest dollar-to-play-ratio entertainments we've enjoyed. The scope is enormous, the strategies border on being limitless, the excitement is genuinely high, and the experience is worth every dime of the game's purchase price."

Jim Trunzo reviewed Civilization in White Wolf #31 (May/June, 1992) and stated that "Civilization should have great appeal to the plotters and thinkers, those who like challenges on a global scale. 'Might makes right' addicts should stick to games less cerebral."

Jeff Koke reviewed Civilization in Pyramid #2 (July/Aug., 1993), and stated that "Ultimately, there are games that are a lot flashier than Civilization, with cool graphics and animation, but there aren't many - or any - in my book that have the ability to absorb the player so totally and to provide an interesting, unique outcome each and every time it's played."

Civilization won the Origins Award in the category Best Military or Strategy Computer Game of 1991. A 1992 Computer Gaming World survey of wargames with modern settings gave the game five stars out of five, describing it as "more addictive than crack ... so rich and textured that the documentation is incomplete". In 1992 the magazine named it the Overall Game of the Year, in 1993 added the game to its Hall of Fame, and in 1996 chose Civilization as the best game of all time:

While some games might be equally addictive, none have sustained quite the level of rich, satisfying gameplay quite like Sid Meier's magnum opus. The blend of exploration, economics, conquest and diplomacy is augmented by the quintessential research and development model, as you struggle to erect the Pyramids, discover gunpowder, and launch a colonization spacecraft to Alpha Centauri. For its day, Civilization had the toughest computer opponents around - even taking into account the "cheats", that in most instances added rather than detracted from the game. Just when you think the game might bog down, you discover a new land, a new technology, another tough foe - and you tell yourself, "just one more game", even as the first rays of the new sun creep into your room ... the most acute case of game-lock we've ever felt.

A critic for Next Generation judged the Super NES version to be a disappointing port, with a cumbersome menu system (particularly that the "City" and "Production" windows are on separate screens), an unintuitive button configuration, and ugly scaled down graphics. However, he gave it a positive recommendation due to the strong gameplay and strategy of the original game: "if you've never taken a crack at this game before, be prepared to lose hours, even days, trying to conquer those pesky Babylonians." Sir Garnabus of GamePro, in contrast, was pleased with the Super NES version's interface, and said the graphics and audio are above that of a typical strategy game. He also said the game stood out among the Super NES's generally action-oriented library.

In 2000, GameSpot rated Civilization as the tenth most influential video game of all time. It was also ranked at fourth place on IGN's 2000 list of the top PC games of all time. In 2004, readers of Retro Gamer voted it as the 29th top retro game. In 2007, it was named one of the 16 most influential games in history at a German technology and games trade show Telespiele. In Poland, it was included in the retrospective lists of the best Amiga games by Wirtualna Polska (ranked ninth) and CHIP (ranked fifth). In 2012, Time named it one of the 100 greatest video games of all time. In 1994, PC Gamer US named Civilization the second best computer game ever. The editors wrote, "The depth of strategies possible is impressive, and the look and feel of the game will keep you playing and exploring for months. Truly a remarkable title." That same year, PC Gamer UK named its Windows release the sixth best computer game of all time, calling it Sid Meier's "crowning glory".

On March 12, 2007, The New York Times reported on a list of the ten most important video games of all time, the so-called game canon, including Civilization.

By the release of Civilization II in 1996, Civilization had sold over 850,000 copies. By 2001, sales had reached 1 million copies. Shelley stated in a 2016 interview that Civilization had sold 1.5 million copies.

In 2022, The Strong National Museum of Play inducted Sid Meier’s Civilization to its World Video Game Hall of Fame.

== Reviews ==
- Casus Belli #70 (July 1992)

== Legacy ==
There have been several sequels to Civilization, including Civilization II (1996), Civilization III (2001), Civilization IV (2005), Civilization Revolution (2008), Civilization V (2010), Civilization VI (2016), and Civilization VII in 2025. In 1994, Meier produced a similar game titled Colonization.

Civilization is generally considered the first major game in the genre of "4X", with the four "X"s equating to "explore, expand, exploit, and exterminate", a term developed by Alan Emrich in promoting 1993's Master of Orion. While other video games with the principles of 4X had been released prior to Civilization, future 4X games would attribute some of their basic design principles to Civilization.

A famous supposed bug in the original game - later debunked - is that a computer-controlled Gandhi, normally a highly peaceful leader, could become a nuclear warmonger if provoked. It was theorized that the game started Gandhi's "aggression value" at 1 out of a maximum 255 possible for an 8-bit unsigned integer, making a computer-controlled Gandhi tend to avoid armed conflict. However, once a civilization achieves democracy as its form of government, its leader's aggression value falls by 2. Under normal arithmetic principles, Gandhi's "1" would be reduced to "-1", but because the value is an 8-bit unsigned integer, it supposedly wraps around to "255", causing Gandhi to suddenly become the most aggressive opponent in the game.

Interviewed in 2019, developer Brian Reynolds said with "99.99% certainty" that this story was apocryphal, recalling Gandhi's coded aggression level as being no lower than other peaceful leaders in the game, and doubting that a wraparound would have had the effect described. He noted that all leaders in the game become "pretty ornery" after their acquisition of nuclear weapons, and suggested that this behaviour simply seemed more surprising and memorable when it happened to Gandhi. Meier, in his autobiography, stated "That kind of bug comes from something called unsigned characters, which are not the default in the C programming language, and not something I used for the leader traits. Brian Reynolds wrote Civ II in C++, and he didn't use them, either. We received no complaints about a Gandhi bug when either game came out, nor did we send out any revisions for one. Gandhi's military aggressiveness score remained at 1 throughout the game." He then explains the overflow error story was made up in 2012. It spread from there to a Wikia entry, then eventually to Reddit, and was picked up by news sites like Kotaku and Geek.com. The story may have originated from the fact that 2010's Civilization V was deliberately written with Gandhi having an affinity for nuclear weapons, added as a joke by developer Jon Shafer. The misinformation around this bug led to the meme known as "Nuclear Gandhi".

Another relic of Civilization was the nature of combat where a military unit from earlier civilization periods could remain in play through modern times, gaining combat bonuses due to veteran proficiency, leading to these primitive units easily beating out modern technology against all common sense, with the common example of a veteran phalanx unit able to fend off a battleship. Meier noted that this resulted from not anticipating how players would use units, expecting them to have used their forces more like a war-based board game to protect borders and maintain zones of control rather than creating "stacks of doom". Future civilization games have had many changes in combat systems to prevent such oddities, though these games do allow for such random victories.

The 1999 game Sid Meier's Alpha Centauri was also created by Meier and is in the same genre, but with a futuristic/space theme; many of the interface and gameplay innovations in this game eventually made their way into Civilization III and IV. Alpha Centauri is not actually a sequel to Civilization, despite beginning with the same event that ends Civilization and Civilization II: a crewed spacecraft from Earth arrives in the Alpha Centauri star system. Firaxis' 2014 game Civilization: Beyond Earth, although bearing the name of the main series, is a reimagining of Alpha Centauri running on the engine of Civilization V.

A 1994 Computer Gaming World survey of space war games stated that "the lesson of this incredibly popular wargame has not been lost on the software community, and technological research popped up all over the place in 1993", citing Spaceward Ho! and Master of Orion as examples. That year MicroProse published Master of Magic, a similar game but embedded in a medieval-fantasy setting where instead of technologies the player (a powerful wizard) develops spells, among other things. In 1999, Activision released Civilization: Call to Power, a sequel of sorts to Civilization II but created by a completely different design team. Call to Power spawned a sequel in 2000, but by then Activision had sold the rights to the Civilization name and could only call it Call to Power II.

An open source clone of Civilization has been developed under the name of Freeciv, with the slogan "'Cause civilization should be free." This game can be configured to match the rules of either Civilization or Civilization II. Another game that partially clones Civilization is a public domain game called C-evo.
