= Civilization: A New Dawn =

2017 strategy board game

- Civilization: A New Dawn box cover
- Players: 2-4
- Playing time: 1-2 hours
- Skills: Tactics, Strategy

Sid Meier's Civilization: A New Dawn is a 2017 strategy board game created by James Kniffen based on the Civilization series of video games. It is primarily inspired by the series' 2016 iteration, Civilization VI. Each player takes the role of a historical civilization, competing with other players with the goal of fulfilling various historically-inspired victory conditions in order to win the game.

== Civilizations ==
There are 8 base game Civilizations in A New Dawn and 10 more added in the Expansion Pack Terra Incognita.

1. America
2. Aztec
3. Egypt
4. France
5. Japan
6. Rome
7. Scythia
8. Sumeria
9. China (Terra Incognita)
10. England (Terra Incognita)
11. Georgia (Terra Incognita)
12. Inca (Terra Incognita)
13. Indonesia (Terra Incognita)
14. Netherlands (Terra Incognita)
15. Nubia (Terra Incognita)
16. Ottomans (Terra Incognita)
17. Poland (Terra Incognita)
18. Zulu (Terra Incognita)

== Reception ==
Some reviews praised A New Dawn's features, many of which simplified the game compared to its 2010 predecessor, Civilization: The Board Game. Deseret News praised the addition of "focus cards" particularly and called the game "engrossing", stating that it "doesn't have all the bells and whistles of its older brother, but it has its own secret sauce, an original new mechanism that streamlines play while keeping things detailed and interesting." Some reviews stated that the game might be "too streamlined". Luke Plunkett of Kotaku.com compared it unfavorably with the computer-game version, writing, "It reaches too far, and by cutting straight to the heart of Civilization's video game design, forgets everything else that makes Civ so much fun on a computer." The game has an overall rating of 7.3 on the website BoardGameGeek.com.
