= Civilization: Call to Power =

1999 video game

- Developer: Activision (Note: Mac OS port developed by Westlake Interactive; Linux port developed by Loki Software. BeOS port developed by Wildcard Design.)
- Publisher: Activision (Note: Mac OS port published by MacSoft. BeOS port published by Wildcard Design.)
- Director: Cecilia Barajas
- Producer: Mark Lamia
- Designer: William Westwater
- Programmer: Steve Mariotti
- Artist: Rick Glenn
- Series: Civilization
- Platforms: Windows, Linux, Mac OS, BeOS
- Release: Windows: UK: April 2, 1999; NA: April 5, 1999; Linux; May 15, 1999; Mac OS: NA: January 17, 2000; EU: 2002; BeOS: NA: March 22, 2000
- Genre: Turn-based strategy
- Modes: Single-player, multiplayer

Civilization: Call to Power is a turn-based strategy game developed by Activision for Microsoft Windows as an attempt to capitalize on the success of the Civilization computer games by Sid Meier. It was ported to Linux by Loki Software, as well as BeOS by Wildcard Design, becoming one of the very few commercial games for that operating system.

A sequel, Call to Power II, was released 18 months after the original. The sequel could not have "Civilization" in its title because Activision did not have a license for the "Civilization" name for a second game.

== Gameplay ==
=== Timeline and epochs ===
One of the most noticeable differences from the previous Civilization games is that the timeline of the game does not end in the 21st century, but rather goes to the year 3000.

There are five epochs in this game: Ancient Age, Renaissance, Modern Age, Genetic Age, and Diamond Age. Call to Power adds a more thorough space colonization as well as sea colonization, with the appropriate technological advances (available in the Genetic Age).

=== Terrain features ===
Similar to Civilization II, the game uses an isometric view, although each tile is actually two separate tiles: the space level on top of a "terrestrial" level (thus, this game has a z-coordinate to represent position). Players can toggle between "Earth view" and "space view". All land and naval units are exclusively terrestrial, although most land units can be launched into space inside a cargo pod by a rail launcher in cities or via a space plane.

Space fighters and space planes can freely travel in space and in the atmosphere. While the SWARM warrior can survive in space as well as the earth, it cannot launch itself into space. There are also some units that exist in space exclusively (i.e. cannot make a re-entry into the atmosphere) such as the Star Cruiser, the Phantom and the Space Bomber.

Space produces no resources, as it is a vast void. However, once a space colony is built, players can build food pods and assembly bays to produce resources for the colony.

"Water tiles" are also divided into several types. After submarines are available, the type of tile in oceans can be seen (e.g. continental shelf, deep sea trench, rift, etc.). Once the technology for sea colonies is discovered, undersea tunnels can be built to link to other sea colonies and dry land. Fisheries and undersea mines can also be built to produce resources.

=== Pollution ===
In Call to Power, pollution is produced in meaningful quantities after the Industrial Revolution advance. Cities that produce a lot of pollution will start to produce "dead tiles" within their city radius. Such tiles produce no resources. If pollution is left unchecked, eventually the game will give a warning that global disasters will occur. Disasters include change in climate, ozone deterioration, and global warming. In the case of global warming, the game informs the player that "ice caps have melted" and sea levels have risen. Tiles affected are turned into either coast or shallow water, and cities on tiles that become shallow water or coast are destroyed.

The destruction of the ozone layer causes a large number of land tiles to become dead tiles. If a nation is appropriately technologically advanced, then that nation can repair dead tiles, but only at a significant cost of industrial production. The "Gaia Controller" wonder removes all pollution in the game but can be built only in the Diamond Age.

Pollution is exacerbated by several city facilities such as factories and oil refineries. On the flip side, some facilities such as recycling plants and nuclear reactors will reduce the production of pollution. Additionally, certain events such as space launches and use of nuclear weapons will result in one-time additions of pollution each time that they occur.

An initial setup feature is game play without pollution problems.

=== Happiness ===
While playing the game, the happiness level of the citizens must be maintained. If a city is far away from the capital, is overcrowded, polluted, overworked, starved or underpaid, the happiness level will drop with riots and revolts occurring. Cities also experience unhappiness during wartime, especially if they have just been conquered by another empire. Many terrorist units can decrease the happiness of an enemy city. For example, if a city is "infected", it will lose both population and happiness. If the happiness' level goes under 75, then the city is in danger of rioting. If a city riots, it does not produce any work during that turn. If happiness in cities continues to decline, revolution becomes a possibility. If that happens, the city's inhabitants become "barbarians", or change nationality to another country if another country has the Egalitarian Act Wonder. However, if the happiness of a city reaches very high levels, it "celebrates". Some buildings can increase happiness (e.g. temples, cathedrals, body transplants), and wonders can increase happiness (e.g. Immunity Chip, Ramayana).

=== Wonders ===
These can be built by any civilization who has acquired the technology to do so. They take a longer time to build than ordinary buildings or units of that age, but have a greater effect, and a cinematic is shown when the player builds one. The wonders usually affect the civilization as a whole (with exceptions, such as Galileo's Telescope which effectively doubles scientific production in the city which it is built), and can only be built by one civilization. As with previous games, wonders can go obsolete with technological advances; if someone researches "Age of Reason", the Stonehenge wonder no longer has any benefits. Generally, wonders of the future have a greater effect than wonders of the past. If a city containing a wonder is taken by another player, then ownership of the wonder and its benefits go to the conqueror.

=== Victory conditions ===
Apart from conquering all opponents, players can achieve victory by completing the Alien Life Project, which is triggered by the "wormhole sensor" wonder. After a wormhole probe is sent through the wormhole, an alien life lab and a series of upgrades must be built to achieve victory. A player can also win by converting all enemy cities on the map. The final option is to get the highest score by the year 3,000.

== Release ==
Call to Power was published by Activision for Windows in 1999.

A Linux port was announced on January 26, 1999 by Loki Software. Pre-orders were collected by Loki and via GameCellar. The port was set to ship in the week of April 26, but the date was postponed by a week to include bug fixes by Activision. On May 15, Loki announced it had begun shipping. It was distributed in Europe via SUSE by Media Markt and other retailers. It marked the availability of the first major commercial video game for the Linux platform. In January 2000, the game was also released for Macintosh. A BeOS port is also known to exist.

== Reception ==
Reception

Aggregate score
Aggregator	Score
GameRankings	71%

Review scores
Publication	Score
AllGame	2.5/5 (Mac)
CNET Gamecenter	6/10
Computer Games Strategy Plus	2/5
Computer Gaming World	3.5/5
Edge	9/10
EP Daily	8/10
GamePro	2.5/5
GameSpot	6.7/10
IGN	4.8/10 (PC & Mac)
Next Generation	2/5
PC Accelerator	6/10
PC Gamer (US)	65%

The PC version received average reviews according to the review aggregation website GameRankings. Next Generation said that the former version was "not without its good points, but in the end it's difficult to enjoy. Gamers hungry for a worthy sequel to Civ II will find it in Sid Meier's Alpha Centauri."

The game was the 16th-best-selling computer game of the first half of 1999. According to PC Data, a firm that tracked sales in the U.S., it sold 293,046 units by September 2000.

The game was a nominee for GameSpot's "Most Disappointing Game of the Year" award, which went to Ultima IX: Ascension.
