= Civilization Revolution 2 =

2014 video game

- Developers: Firaxis Games; 2K China
- Publisher: 2K
- Designer: Sid Meier
- Series: Civilization
- Platforms: iOS, Android, PlayStation Vita
- Release: iOS; July 2, 2014; Android; November 7, 2014; PlayStation Vita: JP: December 3, 2015; EU: March 28, 2016; NA: March 29, 2016
- Genre: Turn-based strategy
- Modes: Single-player, multiplayer

Sid Meier's Civilization Revolution 2 is a 4X turn-based strategy video game for portable platforms, developed in 2014 by Firaxis Games with Sid Meier as designer. It is a spin-off of the Civilization series and a sequel to Civilization Revolution.

== Gameplay ==
The game features returning leaders from the original Civilization Revolution, such as Abraham Lincoln and Napoleon Bonaparte, along with new leaders such as Winston Churchill and John F. Kennedy. Players are tasked with building an empire from one of several choices, including Japan, America and Russia, among others. Once the player has founded their capital, the player may start research and city production. Other civilizations are also on the map, whom the player can discuss with and trade technologies. There are four ways to win the game: Domination (capture all enemy capitals), Economic (collect 20,000 gold pieces and build the World Bank), Cultural (acquire 20 converted cities, wonders, or great people, then build the United Nations), and Science (be the first to launch a spaceship to Alpha Centauri). Each victory has different ways of achieving it.

== Releases ==
The iOS version of the game was released in July 2014. An Android version of the game was released on November 7, 2014.

A PlayStation Vita version of the game, entitled Civilization Revolution 2 Plus (シヴィライゼーション レボリューション2＋, Shiviraizēshon Reboryūshon 2+), was announced in October 2015. Adding exclusive scenarios, units and world leaders (including Oda Nobunaga, Heihachiro Togo and Himiko), the game was set for release globally on December 3, 2015. Ultimately it only launched in Asia on that date, whereas the western release was delayed twice before coming out on late March 2016. A physical version, featuring box art designed by Hidari, is available in Asia in both local languages and English. The PS Vita version lacks multiplayer.

== Reception ==
Reception

Aggregate score
Aggregator	Score
Metacritic	(Vita) 77/100 (iOS) 66/100

Review scores
Publication	Score
Eurogamer	5/10
Famitsu	(Vita) 30/40
Game Informer	7.25/10
GameRevolution	7/10
Gamezebo	3/5
IGN	6.9/10
Pocket Gamer	3.5/5
TouchArcade	3.5/5
USgamer	2.5/5
VideoGamer.com	7/10
Digital Spy	3/5
National Post	7/10

The original Civilization Revolution 2 received "average" reviews, while Civilization Revolution 2+ received generally favorable reviews, according to the review aggregation website Metacritic. In Japan, Famitsu gave the latter version a score of 30 out of 40.

Chad Saphieha of National Post gave the original game seven out of ten, saying, "It's hard to recommend Civilization Revolution 2 to those who already played the original. But if this is your first dose of Civ, you're in for a treat." However, Sam White of Digital Spy gave it three stars out of five, saying, "As a tidy-looking package, Civilization Revolution 2 ups the ante in almost every way. It's bold and colourful, and looks fantastic on iPad's gorgeous Retina display. If you're a veteran fan of the series like me, then this mobile sequel might put you off at first. It feels constricted to the mobile world, without the sense of epic scale you get zooming out on your huge empires in the PC games." Roger Hargreaves of Metro gave it a similar score of six out of ten, saying, "Civilization on a smartphone (or tablet) is still an enticing prospect but this so-called sequel shows very little improvement over the original and is now missing a major play mode."
