= Dawn of the Ancients =

Play-by-mail wargame

- Publishers: Game Systems Inc. (US), KJC Games (UK)
- Years active: 1984 to unknown
- Genres: wargame, play-by-mail
- Languages: English
- Systems: mail
- Players: 12
- Playing time: 18–24 months
- Materials required: Instructions, order sheets, turn results, paper, pencil
- Media type: Play-by-mail or email

Dawn of the Ancients is a closed-ended, computer moderated, play-by-mail (PBM) wargame. It was published by Game Systems Inc., in August 1984 as its second offering after Earthwood. In 1988, KJC Games began offering the game in the United Kingdom.

Twelve players led major historical Mediterranean civilizations in a wargame with the purpose of achieving victory through conquest or status. Gameplay occurred on a hex map comprising the Mediterranean Sea and surrounding lands. Games lasted 18–24 months. The game received mixed reviews in various publications in the 1980s.

== History and development ==
Dawn of the Ancients was a closed-ended, computer moderated play-by-mail game. Game Systems Inc., published it on August 1, 1984, as its second offering after the PBM game Earthwood. In 1985, the publisher updated the game, increasing the required victory points from 100 to 250 and available action points per turn from 100 to 125. These changes began with game 16. In 1988, KJC Games began offering the game in the United Kingdom.

== Gameplay ==
Dawn of the Ancients is a historical fantasy wargame. Its setting was "the dawn of the great civilizations" and it had some similarities with the game Civilization. In the game, 12 players vied for control, each leading one of the nations as: "Egyptians, Phoenicians, Parthians, Trojans, Greeks, Macedonians, Romans, Carthaginians, Britons, Gauls, Persians, [and] Huns". This placed the greatest historic Mediterranean civilizations in opposition at game start. In addition, the computer played Atlantis. Players also chose a historic theme—Republic, Barbarian, and Empire—each with military and economic implications. Gameplay occurred on a hex map. This included the Mediterranean Sea and land areas comprising 1,380 hexes.

The game's purpose is to win by attaining the required number of victory points, or "to be the only nation to have a home city higher than level three" at game's end. Up to three allied nations can share a win. Players move toward victory by various actions such as acquiring map hexes, increasing the strength of home cities, increasing military strength, and waging war on other players. There are sixteen possible actions. Players are allocated a set number of points per turn to conduct actions toward these ends. Each nation could have up to 15 leaders as well. Games lasted 18–24 months.

== Reception ==
Cathy Cunning reviewed the game in a 1985 issue of Paper Mayhem. She noted some problems with the game, while stating that she would recommend it to "anyone who is looking for a simple game that still has the potential of being very interesting".

Greg Tackett and Mike Scheid reviewed the game in a 1987 issue of Flagship. They spoke positively about the publisher. Both observed various game issues with Tackett providing a generally negative review and Scheid calling it "a good introductory historical wargame" with good expansion potential.

== See also ==
- List of play-by-mail games

== Bibliography ==
- Cunning, Cathy (July–August 1985). "Dawn of the Ancients". Paper Mayhem. No. 13. p. 30.
- Webber, David (March–April 1987). "Inside Game Systems, Inc". Paper Mayhem. No. 23. p. 30.
- Tackett, Greg; Scheid, Mike (Spring 1987). Coulshed, Mark (ed.). "Mediterranean Madness". Flagship. No. 14. pp. 21–22, 26. An edited combination of two Dawn of the Ancients reviews written by Greg Tackett and Mike Scheid.
- Kavanagh, Brendan (1988). "1988 Game Offerings: Dawn of the Ancients". Crash. No. 54.
