= Civilization (series) =

Video game series

Sid Meier's Civilization
- Genres: Turn-based strategy, 4X
- Developers: MicroProse; Activision; Firaxis Games
- Publishers: MicroProse; Activision; Hasbro Interactive; Infogrames; 2K
- Creator: Sid Meier
- Platforms: Amiga, Atari ST, SNES, Windows, Linux, Mac OS, PlayStation, Nintendo Switch, PlayStation 4, Xbox One, Xbox 360, PlayStation 3, iOS, Android, Nintendo DS, N-Gage, Windows Phone, Facebook Platform, PlayStation Vita, PlayStation 5, Xbox Series X/S, Sega Saturn, Nintendo Switch 2
- First release: Civilization; September 1991
- Latest release: Civilization VII; February 11, 2025

Sid Meier's Civilization or simply Civilization is a series of turn-based strategy video games, first released in 1991. Sid Meier developed the first game in the series and has had creative input for most of the rest, and his name is usually included in the formal title of these games, such as Sid Meier's Civilization VII. There are seven main games in the series, a number of expansion packs and spin-off games, as well as board games inspired by the video game series. The series is considered a formative example of the 4X genre, in which players achieve victory through four routes: "eXplore, eXpand, eXploit, and eXterminate". Many of its installments have been cited as amongst some of the greatest video games of all time.

All titles in the series share similar gameplay, centered on building a civilization on a macro-scale from prehistory up to the near future. Each turn allows the player to move their units on the map, build or improve new cities and units, and initiate negotiations with the human or computer-controlled players. The player will also choose technologies to research. These reflect the cultural, intellectual, and technical sophistication of the civilization, and usually allow the player to build new units or to improve their cities with new structures. In most games in the series, one may win by military conquest, achieving a certain level of culture, building an interstellar space ship, or achieving the highest score, among other means. Later games have introduced gameplay concepts and victories based on religion, economics, and diplomacy. Meier had adapted an approach for each new title so that it contains a third of existing features, another third that are improvements from the previous game, and the remaining third as introducing new features. Newer games often include extendable downloadable content that adds to that game, and often will become part of the new features in the next main game of the series.

The series was first developed by Meier while at MicroProse, the studio he co-founded. After MicroProse was acquired by Spectrum Holobyte, Meier left with other designers to form Firaxis Games in 1996, which has been the principal developer of the series since. Over the years, some of the crew involved in developing the series became successful in producing their own strategy games, such as Bruce Shelley (Civilization co-designer) of Age of Empires fame, Brian Reynolds (Civilization II lead designer and programmer), who went on to create Rise of Nations, and Soren Johnson (Civilization III co-designer and Civilization IV lead designer and programmer), who worked on Spore and Offworld Trading Company. Some issues associated with the Civilization name, due to the 1980 Civilization board game created by Francis Tresham, arose during the late 1990s but have been resolved through agreements, settlements, and publishing company acquisitions; presently Take-Two, the parent company of Firaxis, owns full rights to both the name and intellectual property for the series. According to 2K, Firaxis' owner, the series has shipped more than 70 million total by June 2024.

== History ==
Release timeline Main titles in bold text MicroProse titles Firaxis titles Firaxis/Take-Two titles
1991	**Civilization**
1992
1993
1994	Colonization
1995	CivNet
1996	**Civilization II**
1997
1998
1999	Alpha Centauri
1999	Civilization: Call to Power
1999	Civilization II: Test of Time
2000	Call to Power II
2001	**Civilization III**
2002
2003
2004
2005	**Civilization IV**
2006	CivCity: Rome
2007
2008	Civilization Revolution
2008	Civilization IV: Colonization
2009
2010	**Civilization V**
2011
2012
2013
2014	Civilization: Beyond Earth
2014	Civilization Revolution 2
2015	Sid Meier's Starships
2015	Civilization Online
2016	**Civilization VI**
2017
2018
2019
2020
2021
2022
2023	Civilization: Eras & Allies
2024
2025	**Civilization VII**

=== Development at MicroProse (1989–1996) ===
Sid Meier and Bill Stealey co-founded MicroProse in 1982 to develop a number of flight simulators and military strategy software titles. Around 1989, Meier wanted to start developing new types of games to expand his repertoire, inspired by the recent successes of the god games SimCity (1989) and Populous (1989). Meier considered these games demonstrations that video games did not need to be about destruction all the time. He worked with a recent hire, Bruce Shelley, a former board game designer from Avalon Hill, to craft new god games. They first created Railroad Tycoon in 1990, inspired by Shelley's work at producing Avalon Hill's 1830: The Game of Railroads and Robber Barons, inspired by Francis Tresham's 1829. Meier brainstormed upon his idea of combining global conquest inspired by Risk, city management from the early Empire games, and adding in the concept of a technology tree. Meier worked back and forth with Shelley to refine this prototype before presenting it to the company in full to bring to a full release, which became the first Civilization game, published in September 1991. The name was selected late in the process, Tresham had already published the 1980 Avalon Hill board game Civilization, which was similar conceptually but had different game play. Sid Meier claimed that the board game was not a direct inspiration, however, MicroProse negotiated a license for the name from Avalon Hill. The addition of Meier's name to the title identifying it as Sid Meier's Civilization, was from Stealey's suggestion at the time. Since games like Civilization diverged from MicroProse's combat simulators, Stealey suggested the addition of Meier's name as to capture the interest of players that would recognize Meier's name from the previous titles he developed and give these other games a try; Meier found this worked and continued to use his name as part of the series' branding. Despite Meier's initial reservations, Reynolds built modding capabilities into the game for players, a feature that became a staple of the series.

Following on Civilization, Meier was prompted to develop a number of similar simulation titles, a situation that did not sit well with Stealey who wanted MicroProse to continue to develop flight simulators; at this point, Meier did not actually work for MicroProse but served as a contractor, having sold his shares to Stealey. One of these titles included Sid Meier's Colonization (1994), during which Meier worked with another recent hire, Brian Reynolds, as he had done with Shelley. With Meier less involved with MicroProse, he opted to give Reynolds the development lead for creating Civilization II (1996), the first sequel to any of Meier's previous games and also the first to have two expansion packs, Conflicts in Civilization and Fantastic Worlds. Meier gave Reynolds some advice on the direction to take the game, and subsequently, Reynolds worked with Doug Kaufman, another MicroProse employee that had worked on writing their adventure games, for Civilization II.

=== Formation of Firaxis (1996–2001) ===
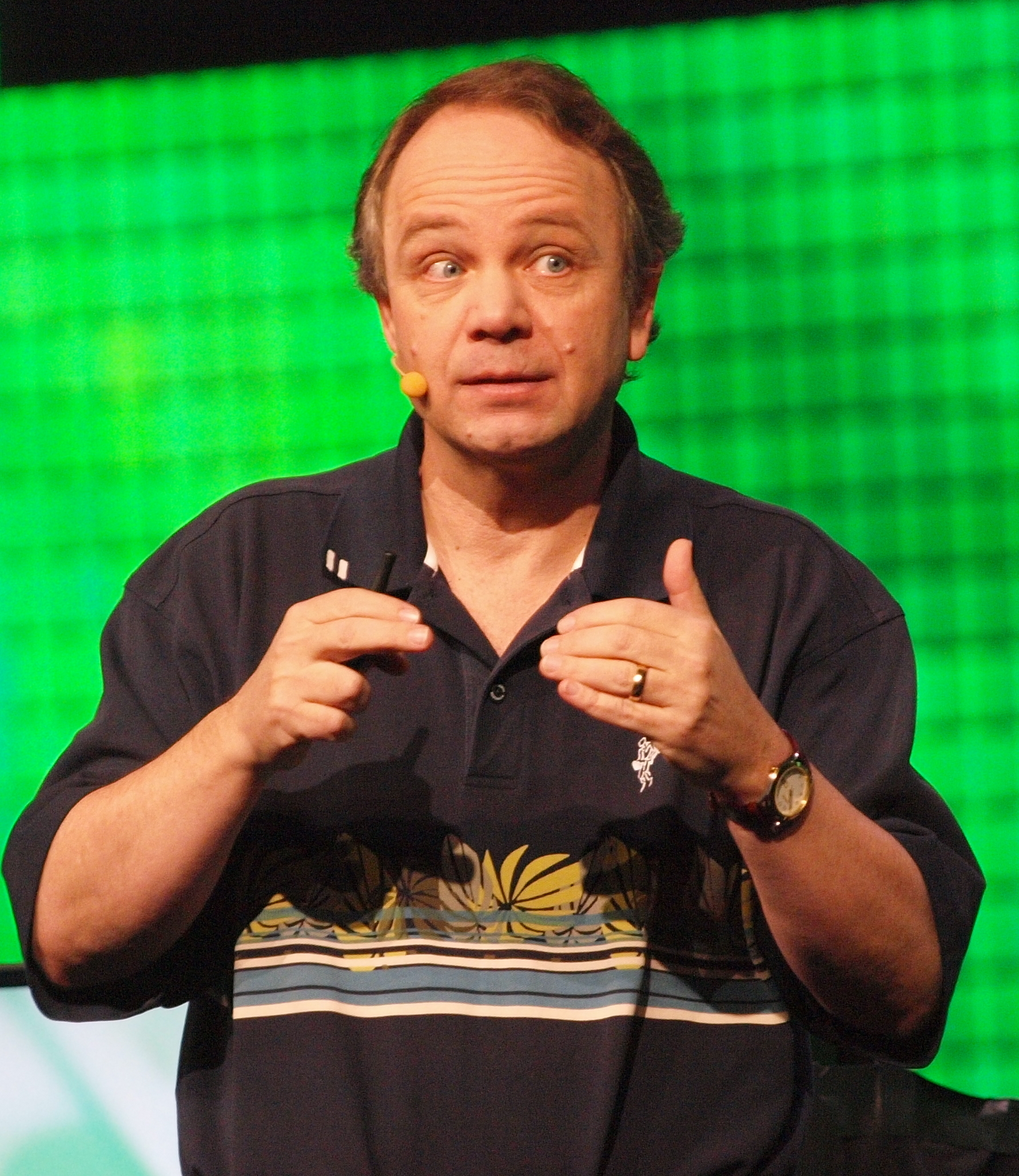
Sid Meier, who conceived the Civilization series and co-founded Firaxis

Stealey had pushed MicroProse to look towards home video consoles and arcade games based on their flight simulator software, but these investments did not pan out, putting the company into debt. After trying to arrange financing from an initial public offering, Stealey opted instead to sell the company to Spectrum Holobyte in 1993, and eventually sold his remaining shares in the company and departed it. Initially MicroProse was kept as a separate company from Spectrum Holobyte. By 1996, Spectrum Holobyte opted to consolidate its brand under the MicroProse name, with that cutting many of the MicroProse staff. At this point, Meier, Reynolds, and Jeff Briggs (one of MicroProse's developers and music composers) left MicroProse to found Firaxis.

Firaxis published additional titles by Meier, the first being Sid Meier's Gettysburg! (1997). Lacking the rights to the Civilization name, they subsequently produced Sid Meier's Alpha Centauri, a "space-based Civilization-style game" released in 1999 and published by Electronic Arts. Alpha Centauri uses a game engine similar to the one used in Civilization II and its storyline continues from where the Civilization franchise ends, namely the colonization of a planet in Alpha Centauri.

=== Naming rights litigation from Activision and Avalon Hill (1997–1998) ===
Prior to the first Civilization video game, an existing 1980 board game of the same name had been developed by Francis Tresham, published in Europe by his company Hartland Trefoil and licensed for publication in the United States by Avalon Hill. The board game and video game share many common elements including the use of a technology tree, and while Meier stated he had played the board game, he stated it had far less influence in his video game's design compared to the significant influence of SimCity and Empire. When MicroProse opted for the name Civilization for the video game, the company worked out a deal with Avalon Hill to allow them to use the Civilization name.

In April 1997, Activision acquired the rights to the name "Civilization" on its PC games from Avalon Hill. Seven months later Avalon Hill and Activision sued MicroProse over trademark infringement over the rights to the "Civilization" name, asserting that the agreement with MicroProse on the name Civilization only extended to the first game and no others, specifically targeting Civilization II. In response to the lawsuit, MicroProse bought Hartland Trefoil in December 1997. This move sought to establish "MicroProse as the preeminent holder of worldwide computer game and board game rights under the Civilization brand". In January 1998, MicroProse counter-sued Avalon Hill and Activision for false advertising, unfair competition, trademark infringement, and unfair business practices as a result of Activision's decision to develop and publish Civilization computer games.

In July 1998, Avalon Hill and Activision settled their case against MicroProse out of court. Under the terms of the settlement, MicroProse kept all the rights to the Civilization brand, Avalon Hill had to pay MicroProse $411,000, and Activision acquired a license from MicroProse to publish Civilization: Call to Power, released in April 1999. Avalon Hill accepted this settlement as there were already discussions for Hasbro Interactive to acquire both Avalon Hill and MicroProse. The acquisition of both was completed a month after this settlement, giving Hasbro Interactive the full rights to the Civilization name. which consolidated the Civilization franchise under Hasbro.

=== Publishing by Infogrames (2001–2004) ===
In January 2001, the French company Infogrames bought Hasbro Interactive for $100 million, which included the rights to the Civilization franchise, the rights to the Atari brand, and Hasbro's Game.com handheld game console. Following the sale, Hasbro Interactive was renamed Infogrames Interactive, Inc. In May 2003, Infogrames changed the name of Infogrames Interactive to Atari Interactive.

Infogrames/Atari Interactive published several of Firaxis' games, including Civilization III, released in 2001. Briggs served as the lead designer with Soren Johnson as lead programmer, and the title included two expansion packs, Play the World and Conquests.

=== Publishing and acquisition by Take-Two (2004–present) ===
Take-Two bought the rights to the Civilization franchise from Infogrames in 2004 for $22.3 million. In October 2005, 2K, a Take-Two subsidiary, published Civilization IV, which was developed by Firaxis with Johnson as game designer. By this point in the series, Meier had adopted a design philosophy of making sure each new Civilization game had "one-third old, one-third improved, and one-third new", a means to allow the new game to be enjoyed by existing fans while able to draw in new players.

Take Two bought Firaxis for $26.7 million including possible performance bonuses in November 2005 which resulted in Take Two owning both the developer and the publisher of the Civilization franchise. Since Take Two's acquisition, Firaxis has developed several more titles in the series, including three main releases, Civilization V (2010), Civilization VI (2016), and Civilization VII (2025), lightweight versions of Civilization for consoles and mobiles in Civilization Revolution (2008), its sequel Civilization Revolution 2 (2014), and Civilization: Beyond Earth (2014), inspired by their previous Alpha Centauri title. Civilization: Eras and Allies mobile game was soft-launched in some regions in 2023.

== Gameplay ==
The main game screen in Civilization II

The main Civilization games are turn-based 4X games, where players attempt to achieve one of several victory conditions against other human and computer-controlled opponents through the actions of "eXplore, eXpand, eXploit, and eXterminate". Civilization uses historical aspects from the development of mankind's civilization, and turns take place over a time scale that starts with the dawn of civilization in the millennia before 1 A.D., and continue through present times and beyond. On each turn, players oversee their civilization's government, determine what technology, culture, and civics the civilization should develop, engage in diplomacy with other civilizations, set production and place improvements within cities, and move their civilization's units across the game's world map, often engaging in combat with other civilizations' enemy units.

A representative city management screen, from Civilization III. The player can see what resources each space controlled by the city produces, the city improvements and units in the city, reallocate resources, and assign new production targets.

Games are played on either pre-defined or procedurally generated maps, creating a world with varied terrain including mountains and oceans. Map generation can be set by several parameters, such as average climate or landmass types. Maps can vary in size, which will affect the number of civilizations that can be played by that map.

Players either select or are randomly assigned a civilization led by a historical figure, based on several factual reigns and empires, including the Romans, Aztecs, and Americans; the civilization choice provides certain unique bonuses, units, and improvements for that player. Players start at random locations on the map, and must found their first city, becoming its default capital until changed by the player, and explore the map and lift its fog of war to find out what is nearby, including potential resources that can be used in production, and where other civilizations are located. Cities will generate several resources based on how large the city is which affects how many map spaces it takes up: food which is required to sustain large cities and allow them to grow; production units used to determine how fast a city can build new units and improvements, science and culture which affect progress along the technology tree, and currency which can be used by the player for several tasks including upkeep of cities and units, speeding up production of a unit or offered as gifts in diplomacy actions. Once a city is founded, the player can then start to produce new units or city improvements. Units include military units, commerce-based units such as caravans to establish trade routes with other cities, and civilian-based groups like workers to help improve the land areas around a city such as by constructing fields or mines. City improvements include buildings that help to boost production types, such a library or university to improve research output, or World Wonders, unique buildings that can only be built by one civilization that grants a large bonus to the first to complete it. Cities will grow over time, expanding to cover more territory on the map while requiring more food and money to maintain, and players can create units that will be able to found new cities, expanding their empire.

Units typically move a set number of spaces per turn, limited by terrain: swamps may slow down faster units, mountains are typically impassible except by air, and water spaces can only be traversed with sea-going vessels that can carry other units. Combat occurs when any unit moves into a space occupied by another unit that is not currently on diplomatic terms with that player. Each unit has attack, defensive, and health values, often factored by the type of terrain they are presently in and if the units are fortified. The results of combat are determined with a degree of randomness based on the attack and defense strengths. Defeated units are eliminated from the game, and if the attacks are victorious, that unit will occupy the space if no other enemy units are there. If this battle took place on a city's main map space, then the attacker unit takes over the city for that civilization, though some games in the series provide the option of razing the city as well. In this manner, a civilization can be conquered by taking over all of its cities, at which point that player is out of the game. In more recent games, cities can also be taken over through the influence of culture or religion from a nearby opposing city. Several units are available for performing espionage work, which are hidden from other players unless certain conditions are met. These units can gain information normally hidden to other players, steal technology and culture, or create unrest in an opponent's city to make it easier to capture.

Conducting negotiations with Stalin of the Soviets in the original Civilization

The player also oversees the general aspects of their civilization. They set specific types of government that can affect production rates, growth, and other factors, though these government civics must be gained through research and culture growth. The player also manages the tax rate on cities, which helps to collect currency to pay for unit and improvement maintenance. The player must manage the happiness of their population, which can be impacted by government choices, taxes, nearby military units and actions, overcrowded cities, and pollution, and mitigated by special units and city improvements. Once a player has discovered an opposing civilization, they can send communication to them to request peace treaties, non-hostile relationships, or offer trades of currency, resources, units, cities, and technology; such trades can also be used to intimidate opponents to threaten to go to war if such demands are not met.

Multiple victory paths are available to players; the following victory conditions are general routes available in most games while other routes can also exist in others. The conquest victory route requires the player to wipe out or take over all capital cities of the other civilizations on the map while still retaining their own. A player may also attempt to win through a diplomatic victory. By establishing friendly ties with other civilizations, the player can achieve victory by having their allies vote appropriately once the United Nations facility is established. Technology victories can be achieved by progressing through the technology tree to study space travel and constructing the parts required to launch a generation ship to Alpha Centauri. With culture elements in newer games, players can achieve a cultural victory by accumulating enough culture over other civilizations and building necessary structures to guide their civilization to a utopia-like state to claim this win. Finally, a player can achieve victory if they have the most points after a set number of turns have been reached; points are based on several factors including the size of the civilization, their progress towards technology and culture, and currency at hand.

To help newer players, the Civilization games include a number of artificial intelligence advisors that suggest which units, city improvements, and technology and cultures they should invest in based on the current state of the game.

The Civilization games can be played in a single-player mode, and both local and online multiplayer modes, along with a number of computer-controlled opponents. Some games provide a means to play asynchronously, where each player is given a set amount of time, such as within a day, to decide their actions and send results to a game server, when then determines the results of all actions and returns this information to players. After the massification of broadband internet access and the emergence of sprawling modding communities for video games, as well as the regular release of DLL source to the public some time after a game was released by the developer, the series saw an explosion of dedicated freeware content to greatly improve and enhance Civilization's game experience.

== Related games ==
Due to licensing disputes between Avalon Hill and MicroProse, the Civilization: Call to Power series was developed by Activision instead of MicroProse. However, the series was consolidated into the Civilization franchise when Hasbro purchased Avalon Hill and MicroProse, in 1999. Additional games, such as Freeciv and FreeCol, have taken inspiration from games within the Civilization franchise, but were developed by third parties unrelated to 2K or Firaxis.

In addition to computer games, several licensed board games inspired by the series have been developed. They include: Sid Meier's Civilization: The Boardgame (2002), Civilization: The Card Game (2006), Sid Meier's Civilization: The Board Game (2010) and Civilization: A New Dawn (2017).

Title	Release	Notes
Freeciv	1996	An open source clone of Civilization.
Civilization: Call to Power	1999	Created by Activision.
C-evo	1999	A freeware game loosely based on Civilization II, created by Steffen Gerlach
Call to Power II	2000	Sequel to Civilization: Call to Power. Due to licensing issues, Civilization could not be in the title.
FreeCol	2003	An open source clone of Sid Meier's Colonization.
Civilization Online	2015	An MMO spin-off intended for the Asian market developed as a collaboration between 2K Games, Firaxis and XL Games (developers of ArcheAge). The game featured a mix of traditional MMORPG gameplay and RTS mechanics set in a highly stylised historical world. It launched in December 2015 through an open beta in South Korea and was shut down a year later.
CivilizationEDU	2017	A modified version of Civilization V aimed to be used in the classroom as an education tool to examine the interaction between military, technology, political and socioeconomic issues. Development was in partnership with GlassLab. The project and GlassLab Games studio were both shut down in 2018.

== Reception ==
In 1996, Next Generation listed the series as number 4 on their "Top 100 Games of All Time", commenting that, "[Sid Meier's] goal was to give players the chance to play God. And he succeeded, admirably." In 1999, Next Generation listed Civilization and Civilization II as number 4 on their "Top 50 Games of All Time", commenting that, "The variables are so complex, it remains the deepest, most replayable strategy game ever designed."

By June 2024, 2K Games stated overall sales of the series had reached 70 million.

== Influence ==
Although not the first such released game to have 4X gameplay elements, the Civilization series is considered to have introduced the defining elements of that genre, in particular the complexity of interlocking gameplay systems introduced in the first Civilization game.

The Civilization games, as well as other 4X games that follow their approach, are frequently associated with the "One More Turn syndrome", in which a player, nearing the end of a play session, might state they will end their game after "one more turn" but be compelled to play on for several more hours and lose track of time. This phenomenon is attributed to the core gameplay loop that provides players feedback on upcoming goals and rewards that they can obtain by playing additional turns while new goals and rewards appear during the intervening turns. Historian Apostolos Spanos has argued that one reason for the success of the Civilization games is that it allows individual players to see themselves as shapers of history: "Finally, the popularity of the game since its first release and until the present shows, that the global community is still deeply charmed by the historical development of the human being as a form of cognitively valuable entertainment. This is probably the most encouraging message communicated through Civilization, not only for us historians but for anyone who understands the importance of historical knowledge and consciousness in life."

Scottish science fiction and mainstream author Iain Banks noted that he spent much time playing the game (appearing to refer to the first version) and that it was one of the inspirations for the concept of the 'Outside Context Problem' central to his Excession novel - the appearance of invaders or travellers who are so advanced that they are totally outside the society's frame of reference. In an interview, Banks specifically compares this to having a Civilization battleship arrive while the player is still using wooden sailing ships. One of the two viewpoint characters in his novel Complicity plays a fictional Civilization-like game, Despot, compulsively.

== Cultural criticism ==
The Civilization series has received criticism for its perceived eurocentrism. Scholar Diane Carr suggests that "games within the Civilization series perpetuate a reductive folk-history that positions Western-style technology oriented progress as 'the only logical development' for humanity. Indigenous groups that have been represented in the Civilization series have previously criticized the game's approach to adapting their cultures and leaders. One such case emerged with the Cree in Canada, who criticized Cree chief Poundmaker's depiction in Civilization VI as promoting "ideologies that are connected to concepts of colonialism and imperialism... which are totally contrary to the beliefs and values of Chief Poundmaker." Building on Ian Bogost's idea of procedural rhetoric, Matt King argues that the Civilization series reinforces, both through its game play and aesthetics, explicitly European notions of progress; extending to European definitions of science, statecraft, state growth, and religion. However, Kate Spowage has argued that Civilization players regularly resist the game's procedural rhetoric, specifically in relation to toponymy. The ability to rename cities is a popular feature of Civilization games, which for Spowage is related to a fan culture that is "critical of colonialism, symbolic dominance, and indigenous erasure".

== See also ==
- Dawn of the Ancients
