= Sid Meier's Alpha Centauri =

1999 strategy video game

- Developer: Firaxis Games (Note: Mac OS version developed by Westlake Interactive)
- Publishers: Electronic Arts (Win); Aspyr Media (Mac); Loki Software (Linux)
- Designers: Brian Reynolds; Bing Gordon; Sid Meier; Douglas Kaufman; Timothy Train
- Composers: Jeff Briggs; David Evans
- Series: Civilization
- Platforms: Windows, Mac OS, Linux
- Release: February 9, 1999: Alpha Centauri Microsoft Windows; NA: February 9, 1999; UK: February 19, 1999 Mac OS; NA: February 3, 2000; EU: March 10, 2000 Linux; WW: August 2000 Alien Crossfire Windows; NA: October 20, 1999; UK: November 25, 1999 Mac OS; EU: March 10, 2000; NA: May 16, 2000 Linux; WW: August 2000
- Genres: 4X, Turn-based strategy
- Modes: Single-player, multiplayer

Sid Meier's Alpha Centauri is a 4X video game, considered a spiritual sequel to the Civilization series. Set in a science fiction depiction of the 22nd century, the game begins as seven competing ideological factions land on the planet Chiron ("Planet") in the Alpha Centauri star system. As the game progresses, Planet's growing sentience becomes a formidable obstacle to the human colonists.

Sid Meier, designer of Civilization, and Brian Reynolds, designer of Civilization II, developed Alpha Centauri after they left MicroProse to join with Jeff Briggs in creating a new video game developer: Firaxis Games. Electronic Arts released both Alpha Centauri and its expansion, Sid Meier's Alien Crossfire, in 1999. The following year, Aspyr Media ported both titles to Classic Mac OS while Loki Software ported them to Linux.

Alpha Centauri features improvements on Civilization II's game engine, including simultaneous multiplay, social engineering, climate, customizable units, alien native life, additional diplomatic and spy options, additional ways to win, and greater mod-ability. Alien Crossfire introduces five new human and two non-human factions, as well as additional technologies, facilities, secret projects, native life, unit abilities, and a victory condition.

The game received wide critical acclaim, being compared favorably to Civilization II. Critics praised its science fiction storyline (comparing the plot to works by Stanley Kubrick, Frank Herbert, Arthur C. Clarke, and Isaac Asimov), the in-game writing, the voice acting, the user-created custom units, and the depth of the technology tree. Alpha Centauri also won several awards for best game of the year and best strategy game of the year.

== Synopsis ==
=== Setting ===
Space-race victories in the Civilization series conclude with a journey to Alpha Centauri. Beginning with that premise the Alpha Centauri narrative starts in the 22nd century, after the 2060 launch of the United Nations colonization mission "Unity" to Alpha Centauri's planet Chiron ("Planet"). Unbeknownst to humans, advanced extraterrestrials ("Progenitors") had been conducting experiments in vast distributed nervous systems, culminating in a planetary biosphere-sized presentient nervous system ("Manifold") on Chiron, leaving behind monoliths and artifacts on Chiron to guide and examine the system's growth. Immediately prior to the start of the game, a reactor malfunction on the Unity spacecraft wakes the crew and colonists early and irreparably severs communications with Earth. After the captain is assassinated, the most powerful leaders on board build ideological factions with dedicated followers, conflicting agendas for the future of mankind, and "desperately serious" commitments. As the ship breaks up, seven escape pods, each containing a faction, are scattered across Planet.

In the Alien Crossfire expansion pack, players learn that alien experiments led to disastrous consequences at Tau Ceti, creating a hundred-million-year evolutionary cycle that ended with the eradication of most complex animal life in several neighboring inhabited star systems. After the disaster (referred to by Progenitors as "Tau Ceti Flowering"), the Progenitors split into two factions: Manifold Caretakers, opposed to further experimentation and dedicated to preventing another Flowering; and Manifold Usurpers, favoring further experimentation and intending to induce a controlled Flowering in Alpha Centauri's Planet. In Alien Crossfire, these factions compete along with the human factions for control over the destiny of Chiron.

=== Characters and factions ===
The game focuses on the leaders of seven factions, chosen by the player from the 14 possible leaders in Alpha Centauri and Alien Crossfire, and Planet (voiced by Alena Kanka). The characters are developed from the faction leaders' portraits, the spoken monologues accompanying scientific discoveries and the "photographs in the corner of a commlink – home towns, first steps, first loves, family, graduation, spacewalk." The leaders in Alpha Centauri comprise: Lady Deirdre Skye, a Scottish activist (voiced by Carolyn Dahl), of Gaia's Stepdaughters; Chairman Sheng-Ji Yang, a Chinese Legalist official (voiced by Lu Yu), of the Human Hive; Academician Prokhor Zakharov, a Russian academic (voiced by Yuri Nesteroff) of the University of Planet; CEO Nwabudike Morgan, a Namibian businessman (voiced by Regi Davis), of Morgan Industries; Colonel Corazon Santiago, a Puerto Rican militiawoman (voiced by Wanda Niño) of the Spartan Federation; Sister Miriam Godwinson, an American minister and social psychologist (voiced by Gretchen Weigel), of the Lord's Believers; and Commissioner Pravin Lal, an Indian surgeon and diplomat (voiced by Hesh Gordon), of the Peacekeeping Forces.

The player controls one of the leaders and competes against the others to colonize and conquer Planet. The Datalinks (voiced by Robert Levy and Katherine Ferguson) are minor characters who provide information to the player. Each faction excels at one or two important aspects of the game and follows a distinct philosophical belief, such as technological utopianism, Conclave Christianity, "free-market" capitalism, militarist survivalism, Chinese Legalism, U.N. Charter humanitarianism, or Environmentalist Gaia philosophy. The game takes place on Planet, with its "rolling red ochre plains" and "bands of lonely terraformed green".

The seven additional faction leaders in Alien Crossfire are Prime Function Aki Zeta-Five, a Norwegian research assistant-turned-cyborg (voiced by Allie Rivenbark), of The Cybernetic Consciousness; Captain Ulrik Svensgaard, an American fisherman and naval officer (voiced by James Liebman), of The Nautilus Pirates; Foreman Domai, an Australian labor leader (voiced by Frederick Serafin), of The Free Drones; Datajack Sinder Roze, a Trinidadian hacker (voiced by Christine Melton), of The Data Angels; Prophet Cha Dawn, a human born on Planet (voiced by Stacy Spenser) of The Cult of Planet; Guardian Lular H'minee, a Progenitor leader (voiced by Jeff Gordon), of The Manifold Caretakers; and Conqueror Judaa Maar, a Progenitor leader (voiced by Jeff Gordon), of The Manifold Usurpers.

=== Plot ===
The story unfolds via the introduction video, explanations of new technologies, videos obtained for completing secret projects, interludes, and cut-scenes. The native life consists primarily of simple wormlike alien parasites and a type of red fungus that spreads rapidly via spores. The fungus is difficult to traverse, provides invisibility for the enemy, provides few resources, and spawns "mindworms" that attack population centres and military units by neurally parasitising them. Mindworms can eventually be captured and bred in captivity and used as terroristic bioweapons, and the player eventually discovers that the fungus and mindworms can think collectively.

A voice intrudes into the player's dreams and soon waking moments, threatening more attacks if the industrial pollution and terraforming by the colonists is not reversed. The player discovers that Planet is a dormant semi-sentient hive organism that will soon experience a metamorphosis which will destroy all human life. To counter this threat, the player or a computer faction builds "The Voice of Alpha Centauri" secret project, which artificially links Planet's distributed nervous system into the human Datalinks, delaying Planet's metamorphosis into full self-awareness but incidentally increasing its ultimate intelligence substantially by giving it access to all of humanity's accumulated knowledge. Finally, the player or a computer faction embraces the "Ascent to Transcendence" in which humans too join their brains with the hive organism in its metamorphosis to godhood. Thus, Alpha Centauri closes "with a swell of hope and wonder in place of the expected triumphalism", reassuring "that the events of the game weren't the entirety of mankind's future, but just another step."

== Gameplay ==
Alpha Centauri and Alien Crossfire feature similar gameplay. Diplomatic actions are handled in pop-up windows, while combat and unit movement are handled on the isometric field shown in the background. Information such as unit health and status changes are displayed on the black field across the bottom.

Alpha Centauri, a turn-based strategy game with a hard science fiction setting, is played from an isometric perspective. Many game features from Civilization II are present, but renamed or slightly tweaked: players establish bases (Civilization II's cities), build facilities (buildings) and secret projects (Wonders of the World), explore territory, research technology, and conquer other factions (civilizations). In addition to conquering all non-allied factions, players may also win by obtaining votes from three-quarters of the total population (similar to Civilization IV's Diplomatic victory), "cornering the Global Energy Market", completing the Ascent to Transcendence secret project, or for alien factions, constructing six Subspace Generators.

The main map (the upper two-thirds of the screen) is divided into squares, on which players can establish bases, move units and engage in combat. Through terraforming, players may modify the effects of the individual map squares on movement, combat and resources. Resources are used to feed the population, construct units and facilities, and supply energy. Players can allocate energy between research into new technology and energy reserves. Unlike Civilization II, new technology grants access to additional unit components rather than pre-designed units, allowing players to design and re-design units as their factions' priorities shift. Energy reserves allow the player to upgrade units, maintain facilities, and attempt to win by the Global Energy Market scenario. Bases are military strongpoints and objectives that are vital for all winning strategies. They produce military units, house the population, collect energy, and build secret projects and Subspace Generators. Facilities and secret projects improve the performance of individual bases and of the entire faction.

In addition to terraforming, optimizing individual base performance and building secret projects, players may also benefit their factions through social engineering, probe teams, and diplomacy. Social engineering modifies the ideologically based bonuses and penalties forced by the player's choice of faction. Probe teams can sabotage and steal information, units, technology, and energy from enemy bases, while diplomacy lets the player create coalitions with other factions. It also allows the trade or transfer of units, bases, technology and energy. The Planetary Council, similar to the United Nations Security Council, takes Planet-wide actions and determines population victories.

In addition to futuristic technological advances and secret projects, the game includes alien life, structures and machines. "Xenofungus" and "sea fungus" provide movement, combat, and resource penalties, as well as concealment for "mind worms" and "spore launchers". Immobile "fungal towers" spawn native life. Native life, including the seaborne "Isles of the Deep" and "Sealurks" and airborne "Locusts of Chiron", use psionic combat, an alternate form of combat which ignores weapons and armor. Monoliths repair units and provide resources; artifacts yield new technology and hasten secret projects; landmarks provide resource bonuses; and random events add danger and opportunity. Excessive development leads to terraforming-destroying fungus blooms and new native life.

Alpha Centauri provides a single player mode and supports customization and multiplayer. Players may customize the game by choosing options at the beginning of the game, using the built-in scenario and map editors, and modifying Alpha Centauri's game files. In addition to a choice of seven (or 14 in Alien Crossfire) factions, pre-game options include scenario game, customized random map, difficulty level, and game rules that include victory conditions, research control, and initial map knowledge. The scenario and map editors allow players to create customized scenarios and maps. The game's basic rules, diplomatic dialog, and the factions' starting abilities are in text files, which "the designers have done their best to make it reasonably easy to modify..., even for non-programmers." Alpha Centauri supports play by email ("PBEM") and TCP/IP mode featuring simultaneous movement, and introduces direct player-to-player negotiation, allowing the unconstrained trade of technology, energy, maps, and other elements.

== Development ==
=== Inspirations ===
In 1996, MicroProse released the lauded Civilization II, designed by Brian Reynolds. Spectrum Holobyte who owned MicroProse at the time, opted to consolidate their business under the MicroProse name, moving the company from Maryland to California by the time the game shipped, and laying off several MicroProse employees. Disagreements between the new management and its employees prompted Reynolds, Jeff Briggs, and Sid Meier (designer of the original Civilization) to leave MicroProse and found Firaxis. Although unable to use the same intellectual property as Civilization II, the new company felt that players wanted "a new sweeping epic of a turn-based game". Having just completed a game of human history up to the present, they wanted a fresh topic and chose science fiction.

With no previous experience in science fiction games, the developers believed future history was a fitting first foray. For the elements of exploring and terraforming an alien world, they chose a plausible near future situation of a human mission to colonize the solar system's nearest neighbour and human factions. Reynolds researched science fiction for the game's writing. His inspiration included "classic works of science fiction", including Frank Herbert's The Jesus Incident and Hellstrom's Hive, A Fire Upon the Deep by Vernor Vinge, and The Mote in God's Eye by Larry Niven and Jerry Pournelle for alien races; Kim Stanley Robinson's Red Mars, Slant by Greg Bear, and Stephen R. Donaldson's The Real Story for future technology and science; and Dune by Herbert and Bear's Anvil of Stars for negative interactions between humans.

Alpha Centauri set out to capture the whole sweep of humanity's future, including technology, futuristic warfare, social and economic development, the future of the human condition, spirituality, and philosophy. Reynolds also said that "getting philosophy into the game" was one of the attractions of the game. Believing good science fiction thrives on constraint, the developers began with near-future technologies. As they proceeded into the future, they tried to present a coherent, logical, and detailed picture of future developments in physics, biology, information technology, economics, society, government, and philosophy. Alien ecologies and mysterious intelligences were incorporated into Alpha Centauri as external "natural forces" intended to serve as flywheels for the backstory and a catalyst for many player intelligences. Chris Pine, creator of the in-game map of Planet, strove to make Planet look like a real planet, which resulted in evidence of tectonic action. Another concern was that Planet matched the story, which resulted in the fungus being connected across continents, as it is supposed to be a gigantic neural network.

Terraforming is a natural outgrowth of colonizing an alien world. The first playable prototype was just a map generator that tested climate changes during the game. This required the designers to create a world builder program and climatic model far more powerful than anything they had done before. Temperature, wind, and rainfall patterns were modeled in ways that allow players to make changes: for example, creating a ridge-line and then watching the effects. In addition to raising terrain, the player can also divert rivers, dig huge boreholes into the planet's mantle, and melt ice caps.

In addition to scientific advances, the designers speculated on the future development of human society. The designers allow the player to decide on a whole series of value choices and choose a "ruthless", "moderate", or "idealistic" stance. Reynolds said the designers don't promote a single "right" answer, instead giving each value choice positive and negative consequences. This design was intended to force the player to "think" and make the game "addictive". He also commented that Alpha Centauri's fictional nature allowed them to draw their characters "a lot more sharply and distinctly than the natural blurring and greyness of history". Chiron, the name of the planet, is the name of the only non-barbaric centaur in Greek mythology and an important loregiver and teacher for humanity. The name also pays homage to James P. Hogan's 1982 space opera novel Voyage from Yesteryear, in which a human colony is artificially planted by an automatic probe on a planet later named by colonists as Chiron. In the game, Chiron has two moons, named after the centaurs Nessus and Pholus, with the combined tidal force of Earth's Moon, and is the second planet out from Alpha Centauri A, the innermost planet being the Mercury-like planet named after the centaur Eurytion. Alpha Centauri B is also dubbed Hercules, a reference to him killing several centaurs in mythology, and the second star preventing the formation of larger planets. The arrival on Chiron is referred to as "Planetfall", which is a term used in many science fiction novels, including Robert A. Heinlein's Future History series, and Infocom's celebrated comic interactive fiction adventure Planetfall. Vernor Vinge's concept of technological singularity is the origin of the Transcendence concept. The game's cutscenes use montages of live-action video, CGI, or both; most of the former is from the 1992 experimental documentary Baraka.

=== Alpha Centauri ===
In July 1996, Firaxis began work on Alpha Centauri, with Reynolds heading the project. Meier and Reynolds wrote playable prototype code and Jason Coleman wrote the first lines of the development libraries. Because the development of Gettysburg took up most of Firaxis' time, the designers spent the first year prototyping the basic ideas. By late 1996, the developers were playing games on the prototype, and by the middle of the next year, they were working on a multiplayer engine. Although Firaxis intended to include multiplayer support in its games, an important goal was to create games with depth and longevity in single-player mode because they believed that the majority of players spend most of their time playing this way. Reynolds felt that smart computer opponents are an integral part of a classic computer game, and considered it a challenge to make them so. Reynolds' previous games omitted internet support because he believed that complex turn-based games with many player options and opportunities for player input are difficult to facilitate online.

Reynolds said that the most important principle of game design is for the designer to play the game as it is developed; Reynolds claimed that this was how a good artificial intelligence (AI) was built. To this end, he would track the decisions he made and why he made them as he played the game. The designer also watched what the computer players did, noting "dumb" actions and trying to discover why the computer made them. Reynolds then taught the computer his reasoning process so the AI could find the right choice when presented several attractive possibilities. He said the AI for diplomatic personalities was the best he had done up to that point.

Doug Kaufman, a co-designer of Civilization II, was invited to join development as a game balancer. Reynolds cited the Alpha Centauri's balance for the greater sense of urgency and the more pressing pacing than in his earlier game, Sid Meier's Colonization. According to producer Timothy Train, in designing the strengths and weaknesses of the factions, the goal was to suggest, without requiring, certain strategies and give the player interesting and fun things to do without unbalancing the game. He didn't want a faction to be dependent on its strength or a faction's power to be dominant over the rest. Train felt that fun meant the factions always have something fun to do with their attributes.

Around the summer of 1997, the staff began research on the scientific realities involved in interstellar travel. In late 1997, Bing Gordon—then Chief Creative Officer of Electronic Arts—joined the team, and was responsible for the Planetary Council, extensive diplomacy, and landmarks. A few months before the 1998 Electronic Entertainment Expo (E3), the team incorporated the Explore/Discover/Build/Conquer marketing campaign into the game. The game was announced in May 1998 at E3.

In the latter half of 1998, the team produced a polished and integrated interface, wrote the game manual and foreign language translations, painted the faction leader portraits and terrain, built the 3D vehicles and vehicle parts, and created the music. Michael Ely directed the Secret Project movies and cast the faction leaders. 25 volunteers participated in Firaxis' first public beta test. The beta testers suggested the Diplomatic and Economic victories and the Random Events.

There were a lot of "firsts" for our team in the making of Alpha Centauri. We had never done a public beta test before Alpha Centauri, and this was also the first time we released a demo before the game was out. Since we'd not done one before, we didn't know exactly what to expect when we released it, but it turned out to fit right in with Firaxis' iterative design method.

— Brian Reynolds on development aspects Firaxis introduced during Alpha Centauri

The design team started with a very simple playable game. They strengthened the "fun" aspects and fixed or removed the unenjoyable ones, a process Sid Meier called "surrounding the fun". After the revision, they played it again, repeating the cycle of revision and play. Playing the game repeatedly and in-depth was a rule at Firaxis. In the single-player mode, the team tried extreme strategies to find any sure-fire paths to victory and to see how often a particular computer faction ends up at the bottom. The goal was a product of unprecedented depth, scope, longevity, and addictiveness, where the player is always challenged by the game to come up with new strategies with no all-powerful factions or unstoppable tactics. According to Reynolds, the process has been around since Sid Meier's early days at Microprose. At Firaxis, as iterations continue, they expand the group giving feedback, bringing in outside gamers with fresh perspectives. Alpha Centauri was the first Firaxis game with public beta testers.

Finally, Brian Reynolds discussed the use of the demo in the development process. Originally a marketing tool released prior to the game, they started getting feedback. They were able to incorporate many suggestions into the retail version. According to Brian Reynolds, they made improvement in the game's interface, added a couple of new features and fixed a few glitches. They also improved some rules, fine-tuned the game balance and improved the AI. Finally, he adds that they continued to add patches to enhance the game after the game was released. In the months leading to the release of Alpha Centauri, multimedia producer Michael Ely wrote the 35 weekly episodes of Journey to Centauri detailing the splintering of the U.N. mission to Alpha Centauri.

=== Alien Crossfire ===
A month after Alpha Centauri's February 1999 release, the Firaxis team began work on the expansion pack, Sid Meier's Alien Crossfire. Alien Crossfire features seven new factions (two that are non-human), new technologies, new facilities, new secret projects, new alien life forms, new unit special abilities, new victory conditions (including the new "Progenitor Victory") and several additional concepts and strategies. The development team included Train as producer and designer, Chris Pine as programmer, Jerome Atherholt and Greg Foertsch as artists, and Doug Kaufman as co-designer and game balancer.

The team considered several ideas, including a return to a post-apocalyptic earth and the conquest of another planet in the Alpha Centauri system, before deciding to keep the new title on Planet. The premise allowed them to mix and match old and new characters and delve into the mysteries of the monoliths and alien artifacts. The backstory evolved quickly, and the main conflict centered on the return of the original alien inhabitants. The idea of humans inadvertently caught up in an off-world civil war focused the story.

Train wanted to improve the "build" aspects, feeling that the god-game genre had always been heavily slanted towards the "Conquer" end of the spectrum. He wanted to provide "builders" with the tools to construct an empire in the face of heated competition. The internet community provided "invaluable" feedback. The first "call for features" was posted around April 1999 and produced the Fletchette Defense System, Algorithmic Enhancement, and The Nethack Terminus.

The team had several goals: factions should not be "locked-in" to certain strategies; players should have interesting things to do without unbalancing the game, and the factions must be fun to play. The team believed the "coolness" of the Progenitor aliens would determine the success or failure of Alien Crossfire. They strove to make them feel significantly different to play, but still compatible with the existing game mechanics. The developers eventually provided the aliens with Battle Ogres, a Planetary survey, non-blind research, and other powers to produce "a nasty and potent race that would take the combined might of humanity to bring them down". Chris Pine modified the AI to account for the additions. The team also used artwork, sound effects, music, and diplomatic text to set the aliens apart. Other than the aliens, the Pirates proved to be the toughest faction to balance because their ocean start gave them huge advantages.

Upon completion, the team felt that Alien Crossfire was somewhere between an expansion and a full-blown sequel. In the months leading to the release of Alien Crossfire, multimedia producer Michael Ely wrote the 9 episodes of Centauri: Arrival, introducing the Alien Crossfire factions. The game initially had a single production run. Electronic Arts bundled Alpha Centauri and Alien Crossfire in the Alpha Centauri Planetary Pack in 2000 and included both games in The Laptop Collection in 2003. In 2000, both Alpha Centauri and Alien Crossfire were ported to Classic Mac OS by Aspyr Media and to Linux by Loki Software.

== Reception ==
Alpha Centauri received wide critical acclaim upon its release, with reviewers voicing respect for the game's pedigree, especially that of Reynolds and Meier. The video game review aggregator websites GameRankings and Metacritic, which collect data from numerous review websites, listed scores of 92% and 89%, respectively. The game was favorably compared to Reynold's previous title, Civilization II, and Rawn Shah of IT World Canada praised the expansion for a "believable" plot. However, despite its critical reception, it sold the fewest copies of all the games in the Civilization series. It sold more than 100,000 copies in its first two months of release. This was followed by 50,000 copies in April, May and June. In the United States, Alpha Centauri was the tenth-best-selling computer game of 1999's first half. Its sales in that country alone reached 224,939 copies by the end of 1999, and rose to 281,115 units by September 2000.

=== Critical reaction ===
Reception

Aggregate score
Aggregator	Score
Metacritic	92/100

Review scores
Publication	Score
Edge	9/10
GamePro	5/5
GameRevolution	B+
IGN	9.5/10
Next Generation	5/5
The Adrenaline Vault	4.5/5
FiringSquad	90%

The game showed well at the 1998 Electronic Entertainment Expo (E3). Walter Morbeck of GameSpot said that Alpha Centauri was "more than hi-tech physics and new ways to blow each other up", and that the game would feature realistic aliens. Terry Coleman of Computer Gaming World predicted that Alpha Centauri would be "another huge hit". OGR awarded it "Most Promising Strategy Game" and one of the top 25 games of E3 '98. In a vote of 27 journalists from 22 gaming magazine, Alpha Centauri won "Best Turn Based Strategy" of E3 Show Award. Aaron John Loeb, the Awards Committee Chairman, said "for those that understand the intricacies, the wonder, the glory of turn based 'culture building,' this is the game worth skipping class for."

Alpha Centauri's science fiction storyline received high praise; IGN considered the game an exception to PC sci-fi cliches, and GamePro compared the plot to the works of writers Stanley Kubrick and Isaac Asimov. J.C. Herz of The New York Times suggested that the game was a marriage of SimCity and Frank Herbert's Dune. GamePro's Dan Morris said "As the single-player campaign builds to its final showdown, the ramifications of the final theoretical discoveries elevate Alpha Centauri from great strategy game to science-fiction epic." Game Revolution said, "The well crafted story, admirable science-fiction world, fully realized scenario, and quality core gameplay are sure to please." Edge praised the uniqueness of expression saying it was "the same kind of old-fashioned, consensual storytelling that once drew universes out of ASCII." The in-game writing and faction leaders were also well-received for their believability, especially the voice acting. GameSpot reviewer Denny Atkin called the factions and their abilities Alpha Centauri's "most impressive aspect". Greg Tito of The Escapist said, "the genius of the game is how it flawlessly blends its great writing with strategy elements."

Alpha Centauri's turn-based gameplay, including the technology trees and factional warfare, was commonly compared to Civilization and Civilization II. The Adrenaline Vault's Pete Hines said, "While Alpha Centauri is the evolutionary off-spring to [Civilization] and [Civilization II], it is not [Civilization II] in space. Although the comparison is inevitable because of the lineage, it is still short-sighted." Edge in 2006 praised "Alpha Centauri's greater sophistications as a strategy game." IGN said "Alpha Centauri is a better game than Civilization II; it's deep, rich, rewarding, thought-provoking in almost every way." Game Revolution's reviewer was less magnanimous, saying "Alpha Centauri is at least as good a game as Civilization 2. But it is its great similarity that also does it the most detriment. Alpha Centauri simply does not do enough that is new; it just doesn't innovate enough to earn a higher grade." The ability to create custom units was praised, as was the depth of the tech tree. The artificial intelligence of computer-controlled factions, which featured adaptability and behavioral subtlety, was given mixed comments; some reviewers thought it was efficient and logical, while others found it confusing or erratic. Edge was disappointed in the game's diplomacy, finding "no more and no less than is expected from the genre" and unhappy with "the inability to sound out any real sense of relationship or rational discourse."

If you're looking for gratuitous eye candy, then you're obviously in the wrong place. Alpha Centauri's graphics are quite good, but they're not going to make anyone sit up and take notice.

— Bob Colayco, FiringSquad

The game's graphics were widely acknowledged to be above average at the time of its release, but not revolutionary. Its maps and interface were considered detailed and in accordance with a space theme, but the game was released with a limited color palette. The in-game cutscenes, particularly the full motion video that accompanied technological advances, were praised for their quality and innovation. Alpha Centauri's sound and music received similar comments; FiringSquad said "[The sound effect quality] sort of follows the same line as the unit graphics – not too splashy but enough to get the job done."

Next Generation reviewed the PC version of the game, rating it five stars out of five, and stated that "Sid Meier creates yet another masterpiece in this game that, at a glance, looks all too familiar."

Alpha Centauri has won several Game of the Year awards, including those from the Denver Post and the Toronto Sun. It won the "Turn-based Strategy Game of the Year" award from GameSpot as well. The Academy of Interactive Arts & Sciences awarded Alpha Centauri for "PC Strategy Game of the Year" at the 2nd Annual Interactive Achievement Awards; it also received nominations for "Game of the Year", "Computer Entertainment Title of the Year", and "Outstanding Achievement in Interactive Design". In 2000, Alpha Centauri won the Origins Award for Best Strategy Computer Game of 1999. The editors of PC Gamer US named Alpha Centauri their "Best Turn-Based Strategy Game" of 1999, and wrote that it "set a new standard for this venerable genre." Alpha Centauri has the distinction of receiving gaming magazine PC Gamer's highest score to date as of 2019 (98%), alongside Half-Life 2 and Crysis, surpassing Civilization II's score (97%). Alien Crossfire was a runner-up for Computer Games Strategy Plus's 1999 "Add-on of the Year" award, which ultimately went to Heroes of Might and Magic III: Armageddon's Blade.

== Legacy ==
There have been no direct sequels beyond Alien Crossfire, something that writer Greg Tito attributed to Reynolds leaving Firaxis in 2000 to form Big Huge Games. Alien Crossfire producer and lead designer Timothy Train also left Firaxis with Reynolds. However, a spiritual sequel, Civilization: Beyond Earth, was announced by Firaxis in April 2014 and released on October 24, 2014; several of those that worked on Alpha Centauri helped to develop the new title. A review in Polygon noted however that while the new game has better graphics, its story fails to rival the original, a sentiment echoed by another review in PC Gamer. Another in Engadget noted "as a spiritual successor to Sid Meier's Alpha Centauri, however, it's a cut-rate disappointment".

Many of the features introduced in Alpha Centauri were carried over into subsequent Civilization titles; upon its release, Civilization III was compared negatively to Alpha Centauri, whose Civilization characteristics were reminiscent of faction bonuses and penalties. The government system in Civilization IV closely resembles Alpha Centauri's, and Civilization V includes a new victory condition: the completion of the 'Utopia project', which is reminiscent of the Ascent to Transcendence secret project.

According to Edge magazine, Alpha Centauri remained "highly regarded" in 2006. A decade after its release, Sold-Out Software and GOG.com re-released the game for online-download sales. Escapist Magazine reviewed the game in 2014, noting that "Alpha Centauri is still playable. It still has a unique flavor that is unlike anything else".

After the release of the expansion, multimedia producer Michael Ely wrote a trilogy of novels based on the game. Writer Steve Darnall and illustrator Rafael Kayanan also made a graphic novel entitled Alpha Centauri: Power of the Mindworms. Steve Jackson Games published GURPS Alpha Centauri, a sourcebook for the GURPS role-playing game set in the Alpha Centauri universe.

== See also ==
- Alpha Centauri in fiction
- Group mind (science fiction)
