= Call to Power II =

2000 video game

- Developer: Activision
- Publisher: Activision
- Producers: Parker A. Davis; Doug Pearson
- Designer: David White
- Programmers: Joe Rumsey; Steve Mariotti
- Artist: David Dalzell
- Composer: Carey James Chico
- Series: Civilization
- Platform: Windows
- Release: NA: November 20, 2000; EU: November 24, 2000
- Genre: Turn-based strategy
- Modes: Single-player, multiplayer

Call to Power II is a PC turn-based strategy game released by Activision as a sequel to Civilization: Call to Power, which itself was named after the Civilization series by Sid Meier; this game could not have "Civilization" in its title because the license to the Civilization name was lost.

In October 2003, Activision released the source code, enabling the Apolyton gaming community to debug, improve, and add new features. After being unavailable for a long time, the game was re-released in the digital distribution on GOG.com in 2010.

== Gameplay ==
Call to Power II had a number of differences from the previous Call to Power. Chiefly, the first game was criticized for its user interface, which prompted a redesign for the sequel.

Call to Power II also included several gameplay differences. Maximum army size was increased, some balance adjustments were made to avoid the balance problems from the original Call to Power, and the economic system in Call to Power II was reworked so that controlling good terrain became more profitable. Another difference is that the player can receive bonuses for certain achievements, if they are the first to perform the action (recapturing a city, sailing around the world, etc.).

The diplomacy model in Call to Power II was improved, with more agreements available for negotiation. Players could, for example, ask the AI controlled civilizations to stop researching some technology, or to reduce their nuclear weapons arsenal.

Space colonization and the space layer were removed from Call to Power II, along with the "Alien Life Project" as science victory. It was replaced by the new Gaia Controller victory. Here the player builds the Gaia Controller. It requires a certain amount of Gaia Controller Cores and Gaia Satellites which are built in cities, and obelisks, which are built on the terrain. The obelisks cover a certain amount of terrain, which can be increased by building more satellites. The first player who covers 60 % of the map wins the game. Beside the Gaia Controller victory is the diplomatic victory (achieved by forming a world alliance with all other civilizations), the Bloodlust victory (achieved by conquering all other civilizations) and the 2300 AD victory, in which the player who has the highest score in the year 2300 AD wins.

== Community support ==
=== Mods ===
One significant feature of Call to Power II is its support for mods. A large number of game data are stored in database text files such as the Units.txt, where the data about the units are stored. For instance, how much a unit costs to build, its strength, how many move points it has, and which technology the player needs to know to build it. Even more importantly, Call to Power II has a fully documented scripting language called SLIC, with a C-like syntax, through which many things about the game can be tweaked. The game comes with four scenarios. One is just a world map with preset starting positions for the different civilizations. The other three are "Nuclear Detente", "Alexander the Great", and "The Magnificent Samurai". In all three scenarios SLIC is used to trigger game events. The most extreme is the Samurai scenario, where the game is transformed from a turn-based empire building game into a turn-based adventure game demonstrating the modding capabilities. The sole released patch for Call to Power II enhanced the functionality of SLIC, allowing creation of mods that change the gameplay significantly. The game's community created many mods, with the primary goals of fixing the AI and balance issues that were in the original game. Later, new game play features were incorporated through mods as well.

=== Source code release ===
After Activision ceased to support Call to Power II, the Apolyton Civilization Site became the de facto support center for the game, being the only active online community of this game and offering help with technical problems. That site is also largely where the modding efforts occurred.

At one point, the members of the Apolyton site contacted Activision and asked them to release the source code to Call to Power II. After several months of negotiation, Activision agreed and the source code was released in October 2003 exclusively to the Apolyton Civilization Site to allow the community to support the game themselves with community patches. There were limitations to how the source code might be used; for example, no commercial use of anything created with the source base was allowed and that anything created can only be used with the retail version of the game, basically patches.

Originally, the source code project was accessible through a Subversion server, later development moved to GitHub. The community produced several patches over the years, the last version is from January 2025 and supports Windows and Linux.

== Reception ==
Reception

Aggregate score
Aggregator	Score
Metacritic	72/100

Review scores
Publication	Score
CNET Gamecenter	7/10
Computer Games Strategy Plus	4/5
Computer Gaming World	3/5
EP Daily	7/10
Eurogamer	9/10
Game Informer	6/10
GameSpot	7.2/10
GameSpy	87%
GameZone	7.5/10
IGN	6/10
Next Generation	3/5
PC Gamer (US)	48%
X-Play	3/5

The game received "mixed or average reviews" according to the review aggregation website Metacritic. Bruce Geryk of GameSpot highlighted the improved interface, animations and sound, and the game's replay value. Criticisms included the lack of feedback during diplomacy, lack of tactical control during combat, the shift from city micromanagement to army micromanagement, and weak AI. John Lee of NextGen said of the game, "It's a hoot, but it still feels like Civilization, and we've been there, done that, several times over. Luckily for Activision, some of us are eager to go there and do it again."
