= Civilization Revolution =

2008 video game

Sid Meier's Civilization Revolution
- Developer: Firaxis Games
- Publisher: 2K
- Designer: Sid Meier
- Series: Civilization
- Engine: Gamebryo
- Platforms: PlayStation 3, Xbox 360, Nintendo DS, iOS, Windows Phone
- Release: June 13, 2008: PlayStation 3, Xbox 360; PAL: June 13, 2008; NA: July 8, 2008 Nintendo DS; NA: July 8, 2008; PAL: September 5, 2008 iPhone August 10, 2009 iPad April 2, 2010 Windows Phone March 26, 2012
- Genre: Turn-based strategy
- Modes: Single-player, multiplayer

Sid Meier's Civilization Revolution is a 4X, turn-based strategy game developed in 2008 by Firaxis Games with Sid Meier as designer. It is a spin-off of the Civilization series. The video game was released for the PlayStation 3, Xbox 360, Nintendo DS, Windows Phone, and iOS. A Wii version was originally expected but was cancelled. The absence of a PlayStation Portable version was attributed to a lack of development manpower.

A demo was released on Xbox Live Marketplace and the North American PlayStation Store on June 5, 2008. The demo allows players to play until 1250 AD on a fixed map as Cleopatra or Julius Caesar, and also allows multiplayer play. A similar demo, Civilization Revolution Lite, was released for iOS that allows play until the Modern Era as Julius Caesar, Abraham Lincoln, or Genghis Khan. It is also available on Xbox Live Marketplace as a download.

A sequel, Civilization Revolution 2, was released on July 2, 2014. The original game was removed from the iOS App Store on September 1, 2016.

== Gameplay ==
The Xbox 360 version

The main game of Civilization Revolution begins in 4000 BC, with a lone settler unit in the middle of a little-explored region. That settler has the capability to found a city, which, depending on its specific mix of geographical surroundings, begins harvesting food (for the continued growth of the city), production (for the creation of units and buildings), and trade (that can be then turned into either research points or wealth). In the early stages of the game, uncivilized villages consisting of primitives, such as barbarians, and friendly villages will be encountered.

Over time, further settlers can be created, forming new cities; buildings can be built to improve each city's overall productivity; military units can be formed, focusing either on defense, offense, or exploration; and technologies can be researched, allowing for newer buildings and units, among others. Buildings in a final category, Wonders, provide major advantages to the civilization that builds it, either across their entire empire or just in the building city, depending on the Wonder. Meanwhile, rival civilizations are encountered, which can be both valuable trade partners, strategic allies, or dangerous enemies. Ultimately, each civilization competes for land and resources with the purpose of eventual military, technological, cultural, or economic domination.

Civilization Revolution is a turn based strategy game, with every turn representing the passage of several years within the game, which changes from 100 years in the beginning to two years by the end, reflecting the faster pace of contemporary society made possible by technological advancements. Later-era units and buildings are also more expensive to build (in terms of production points) than earlier ones, which is matched with cities' increased efficiency and population. Where the early game tends to be focused on exploring and expanding one's empire, the later game is dominated by the interactions forced upon the player by rival civilizations.

A victory can be achieved in five different ways. Unless specified in a scenario, all five victory conditions are open to be used. Different civilizations have distinct advantages over others depending on their bonuses.

- Domination: Capture all of the other civilizations' capital cities and hold them for one full round; it is not necessary to destroy or capture every city though.
- Culture: Obtain a total of 20 great persons, wonders, and/or converted cities in any combination, then build the United Nations wonder.
- Economic: Acquire 20,000 gold, then build the World Bank wonder.
- Technological: Research all technologies necessary to build and launch a space ship and be the first to reach Alpha Centauri.
- Score (Under Domination): The civilization with the highest score by 2100 AD (If no other victory conditions are met) will win a domination victory.

If the player's civilization is nearing one of the above-mentioned victory conditions other than Domination, all other civilizations will declare war on them in an attempt to delay or stop them from winning. The construction of the World Bank, the construction of the United Nations, and the launching of the ship to Alpha Centauri can all be stopped by capturing the enemy's capital and palace.

Players can control one of 16 different civilizations, each with a different leader. Each civilization starts the game with a different special bonus that can be either a technology, a Great Person, or a special ability. As the game progresses through time, the civilizations also obtain new abilities after researching a specific number of technologies. In a given game each civilization can have up to four bonuses that vary from civilization to civilization. Many of the civilizations have unique specialized units that only they can build, however they are mostly renamed versions of already existing units with identical stats. For example, the Spanish civilization obtains a special unit called the conquistador, but it has the same attack, defense, and movement as the knight, a pre-existing unit.

There are also non-player characters (NPCs) barbarians who will declare war on any civilization they encounter, regardless of that civilization's strength or their own. In contrast to the barbarians in previous installments of the Civilization series, the barbarians in Civilization Revolution live in villages and generally attack from them, although they occasionally venture toward nearby units or cities. In addition, the level of barbarian activity cannot be adjusted as in previous installments, although the level of barbarian activity changes in certain scenarios.

=== Multiplayer ===
Nintendo DS version

Civilization Revolution features multiplayer options, including match making and ranked games for up to four players (in free-for-all, one-on-one, and two-on-two team battle modes), as well as leaderboards and support for voice and video chat. Although many critics and players agree that the multiplayer is slow, there is an option to turn on a turn timer such as in chess to attempt to make the game go faster and one can only use the diplomacy panel and the city screen during other players' turns. Neither split-screen nor hot-seat multiplayer is supported. During online play, the players may move during other online players' turns but computer players will move when every human player has ended their turn.

== Development ==
The game was announced in June 2007.

=== Unreleased Wii version ===
On February 4, 2008 2K Games and Firaxis announced that the Wii version of Civilization Revolution was put on indefinite hold due to lack of manpower and no PlayStation 2 or PlayStation Portable editions of the game to share assets with. Firaxis programmer Scott Lewis explained, "CivRev was originally an Xbox 360/PlayStation 3 project and was in development for over a year before the Wii/DS platforms were added. The result was that the time and effort it would have taken to remake a game built for higher-end hardware from the ground up would simply have been too costly." On June 10, 2008, Sid Meier reaffirmed plans to develop a Wii version, stating that Firaxis had "no intentions of turning backs on the Wii version". However, there were no further updates about the developmental status of the planned Wii version to this day, and thus it remains unreleased.

=== Mobile ports ===
On August 10, 2009, 2K Games released an iPhone version of Civilization Revolution in the App Store, followed by the iPad version on April 2, 2010, available in various countries, including the US, UK and Australia. Multiplayer support was added on February 21, 2013.

On April 4, 2012, it was released for Windows Phone.

=== Downloadable content ===
For the home video game versions, each week a new Firaxis created scenario would become available to players for download. Players would compete to earn the best Civilization Revolution leaderboard score for that scenario during that week. Firaxis also released DLC for the console versions which included wonders, relics, and even specific maps such as deserts, continent look-alikes and several others; new wonders include the Tower of Babel, the Leaning Tower of Pisa and several others which can be utilized in game like any other wonder.

== Reception ==
Reception

Aggregate scores
| Aggregator | Score | | | |
| Aggregator | DS | iOS | PS3 | Xbox 360 |
|---|---|---|---|---|
| GameRankings | 81% | 79% | 85% | 85% |
| Metacritic | 80/100 | N/A | 85/100 | 84/100 |

Review scores
| Publication | Score | | | |
| Publication | DS | iOS | PS3 | Xbox 360 |
|---|---|---|---|---|
| Eurogamer | 9/10 | N/A | 8/10 | 8/10 |
| Famitsu | 28/40 | N/A | 31/40 | 31/40 |
| Game Informer | 8.5/10 | N/A | 9/10 | 9/10 |
| GameRevolution | N/A | N/A | B− | B |
| GameSpot | 8.5/10 | 7.5/10 | 9/10 | 9/10 |
| GameSpy | 4/5 | N/A | 3.5/5 | 3.5/5 |
| GameTrailers | N/A | N/A | 8.4/10 | N/A |
| Giant Bomb | N/A | N/A | 4/5 | 4/5 |
| IGN | (US) 8.2/10 (EU) 8/10 | 6.5/10 | 8.8/10 | 8.8/10 |
| Nintendo Power | 7.5/10 | N/A | N/A | N/A |
| Official Xbox Magazine (US) | N/A | N/A | N/A | 9/10 |
| Pocket Gamer | 4.5/5 | 3/5 | N/A | N/A |
| PlayStation: The Official Magazine | N/A | N/A | 4/5 | N/A |
| The Guardian | N/A | N/A | 4/5 | 4/5 |
| Variety | N/A | N/A | (favorable) | N/A |

Award
| Publication | Award |
|---|---|
| IGN | Best Xbox 360 Strategy Game |

The DS, PlayStation 3, and Xbox 360 versions received "generally favorable reviews" according to the website Metacritic, a review aggregator. GameSpot praised the gameplay and visual design of the PlayStation 3 and Xbox 360 versions but found the multiplayer to be slow. In Japan, where the same console versions were ported and published by CyberFront on December 25, 2008, followed by the DS version on January 29, 2009, Famitsu gave it a score of one six, one eight, and two sevens for the latter console version, and three eights and one seven for the former two console versions.

Edge gave the PlayStation 3 version a score of eight out of ten in its July 2008 issue, saying, "While the streamlined and brisk approach that brushes over some of the minutiae of the previous games might cause some PC fans to baulk, Revolution has concentrated rather than diluted the Civ experience, creating an expression of the concept that's perfectly suited to its platform." Three issues later, however, the magazine gave the DS version seven out of ten, saying, "In terms of distilling the core Civilization experience from PC to handheld, this is almost as victorious as the PC-to-console iterations." Steven Hopper of GameZone gave the same DS version 7.5 out of 10, saying that it "capitalizes on the DS's strengths with some great stylus-based controls. Unfortunately, there are some problems, as the gameplay feels a bit scaled down and the maps feel pretty cramped." Michael Lafferty gave the PlayStation 3 version 8.7 out of 10, saying that it "plays very well on the PS3 with intuitive controls, solid graphics, and streamlined game mechanics that ensure entertainment value." Nick Valentino gave the Xbox 360 version 8.9 out of 10, calling it "a genuinely addictive simulator that will not fail to impress and please fans of the Civ series." Michael Knutson later gave the iPhone version 8.7 out of 10, saying, "Civilization Revolution is a good game for the iPhone, which could have been even better. The biggest pitfalls are the really simplistic graphics, graphical glitches, and lack of multiplayer modes. Even with these issues players will not want to miss out on Civilization Revolution for the iPhone."

Darren Jones of Retro Gamer gave the DS version 70%, saying, "If you want a 'Civ Lite' to play on the bus - due to 'proper' Civ demanding too much time - this largely succeeds. Drop your expectations accordingly, and you'll find a fun, fast-paced game, with built-in scenarios increasing longevity and balancing the simple gameplay. Just don't expect this to replace your PC-based Civ games, or you'll be disappointed." George Jones of GamePro gave the PS3 version a score of 4.25 out of 5, saying, "Cerebral gamers and those with world-conquering ambitions should definitely give this one a try."

The Xbox 360 version won Strategy Game of the Year at the 2008 Official Xbox Magazine Awards. During the 12th Annual Interactive Achievement Awards, the Academy of Interactive Arts & Sciences nominated Civilization Revolution for "Strategy/Simulation Game of the Year".

The game sold 147,600 units on Xbox 360 in North America during July 2008. The iOS version was the ninth best-selling game for the iPhone and iPod Touch in 2009.
