= Civilization (2002 board game) =

2002 board game

Sid Meier's Civilization: The Boardgame is a 2002 board game created by Glenn Drover based on the Civilization series of video games, in particular, Civilization III. Drover himself was a sales manager at Microprose during the original development of Civilization, though he was not directly involved in the creation of the video game.

Sid Meier's Civilization: The Boardgame bears no relation to the Avalon Hill board game of similar name, though the video game series was alleged to have been based on the Avalon Hill game. Sid Meier's Civilization: The Boardgame was published by Eagle Games, but is now considered out-of-print. Up to six players may play, with each player playing as one of six great civilizations.

Sid Meier's Civilization: The Boardgame may be used with either of two different rulesets: the simpler "standard rules" or the "advanced rules", the latter employing more elements taken from the video games.

A further game based on the Civilization series, Civilization: The Board Game, was released in 2010 by Fantasy Flight Games.

== Gameplay ==
The game is played on a stylized map of Earth. At the start of the game, a series of exploration markers are placed face-down on each of the land regions of the board, and each player begins with two small settlements, consisting of a town, a settler unit, and a swordsman unit, on a land region of their choosing (in the advanced rules, each player also begins with one technology). At the start of the game, each player uncovers the exploration markers in the regions where they have settlements, following its effects if necessary (some markers are ignored, based on the type of marker).

Each turn consists of four phases. All players perform actions simultaneously in each phase, though the starting player rotates among the players between turns. The phases are as follows:

- Movement Phase - In this phase, players may move any or all of the units on the board. Depending on how the movement concludes, there may be battles that are needed to be resolved.
- Trade Phase - Players may freely conduct trades for material, mainly for use in a later point in the game. In the advanced game, players are constrained on who they may trade with, based on the technologies that have been researched and the proximity of a player's settlements with another player's.
- Production Phase - Each of the players then produce gold. The amount of gold produced is based on the size of a player's settlements, the numbers and types resources that are near the city, and the technologies that are researched by the player.
- Purchase Phase - Players may purchase units, build or upgrade settlements, and discover new technologies. In the advanced rules, the units and city improvements available for purchase is constrained by the technologies that have been researched, with the player discovering an enabling technology receiving a portion of the unit's cost when other players purchase anything (except settlement upgrades) that the technology enables. Technologies also grant a bonus for the player to research them in the advanced rules. A player may also sell obsolete units for an amount of gold under the advanced rules.

In the standard rules, players reaching a series of milestones may claim a wonder of the world at any point in the game. In the advanced rules, wonders are granted by the purchase of various technologies, and provide a benefit to the player for the era that they are associated with.

The game is divided into four eras: ancient, medieval, industrial, and modern. The era is advanced at the end of a turn in which the following occur:

- In the standard rules, either all technologies of an era are researched, or in which one player discovers three technologies from the current era.
- In the advanced rules, when the first technology from a future era is researched.

Wonders from past eras are no longer available to be claimed, while technologies from older eras become unavailable in the standard game or remain available at a reduced cost in the advanced game. In the advanced game, players may be granted obsolete wonders from researching past-era technologies.

The game ends when any of these happens:

- When only one player with settlements remain
- In the standard rules, when one player discovers three technologies from the modern era
- In the advanced rules, when a player builds a certain wonder that allows them to declare the game over at any point they wish.

In the first case, the player remaining is declared the winner. In all other cases, players are awarded victory points for their settlements, technologies, and wonders. The player with the greatest number of victory points wins the game.

=== Units ===
There are two main types of units in Sid Meier's Civilization: The Boardgame: settlers and military units. Military units are further subdivided into armies (infantry, cavalry, and artillery), fleets, and aircraft. With the exception of aircraft, military units are also distinguished by the era they are first purchased: either the ancient, medieval, industrial, or modern eras. In the advanced game, units of the same type and in the same era are also distinguished by level, based on the technologies that have been discovered (When a technology upgrades the level, all units for all players are automatically upgraded to the new level. Similarly, catapults, which are shared between the ancient and medieval eras as the artillery piece, are all automatically upgraded with the change in age.).

During the movement phase, all armies may move to any adjacent land territory, while fleets may move a number of water spaces based on their eras. Settlers may move two land territories per turn, while aircraft may move up to three territories away. Fleets may be used to move land units across water, while aircraft must end their movement either in a friendly-occupied land territory or in a naval territory with either a friendly battleship (the modern-era fleet) in the standard game or a friendly carrier (the second-level of the modern-era fleet) in the advanced game.

Settlers may be used to peek into any unclaimed exploration markers, though doing so ends their movement. Exploration markers may contain events, which are resolved immediately and removed from the board; terrain, which are replaced face-up and provide production bonuses or penalties to players who build settlements there; resources, which are replaced face-down and permanently turned face-up if a player later builds a settlement there; or the lack of any special feature, which may be removed or replaced as a player sees fit. During the purchase phase, settlers may be converted into settlements for a price; any exploration markers that are face-down are resolved.

=== Combat ===
After one player has moved their pieces, the player may declare a battle against any other player whose pieces are in the same territory; likewise, any opponent may also declare a battle against the player on move in areas where their pieces share territory. Declaration of battles is entirely optional: players may freely share territory with their opponents, and may even share one territory while attacking each other in another. At the start of each battle, other players with units in the contested territory may choose to join either belligerent in the battle, though control of the pieces are temporarily given to the main belligerents for the duration of the battle.

At the start of combat, each player selects one of the pieces under their control. Both opposing units are revealed simultaneously, and a number of dice are rolled based on the era of the units involved: as few as one for ancient era units and as many as four for modern era units. The number of dice rolled also differs by the types of units in combat (for example, cavalry units may roll more dice when facing infantry units), the number of technologies researched by the players involved (standard rules only), whether a player is defending a city (advanced rules only), or whether the unit is supported by aircraft. Aircraft themselves do not conduct combat on their own, and must support other units. Only one aircraft may support one unit at a time. The player with the greatest total of the dice rolled wins the combat, and the losing unit is eliminated (in the event of a tie, both units are eliminated). If a unit supported by aircraft loses in combat, both the unit and the aircraft are eliminated. Likewise, if a fleet is carrying land units across water when it loses in combat, both the fleet and its cargo are lost.

Combat continues until one side is out of units. Any aircraft belonging to the defeated player (which may exist if there are a surplus of aircraft, or not all aircraft were used in support) are destroyed.

=== Settlements ===
In Sid Meier's Civilization: The Boardgame, there are four types of settlements: villages, towns, cities, and metropolises. Only one settlement is permitted on any territory, and settlers may be converted to villages for a price during the purchase phase. Settlements may be upgraded to a higher-level through further purchases, while they may be downgraded due to the effects of exploration markers. Higher levels of settlements produce more gold during the production phase, and are worth more victory points at the end of the game. Settlements may be captured as a result of combat when their owner has no friendly units in the same territory as the settlement. A player is instantly eliminated if they lose their last city.

In the advanced game, each settlement can also be assigned city improvements. Each city improvement may either improve happiness or productivity, and a settlement may be assigned up to two improvements (one each for happiness and productivity). City improvements can be reassigned freely as needed, and are not lost when a city is captured. If the era is advanced, all city improvements are removed from cities.

In the advanced game, settlements are either "happy" or "unhappy", "productive" and "unproductive". Each settlement founded on territories with the "wine" and "gems" resources (found on exploration markers) are automatically happy. A player may designate any one of their other settlements as being happy, while all other settlements (except those under the effect of a city improvement or wonder) are unhappy. Each settlement, unless affected by city improvement or wonder, is considered unproductive, unless it was founded on productive terrain (found on exploration markers). Happy and productive settlements generally produce more gold during the production phase compared to unhappy or unproductive ones. Cities with resources also tend to produce more gold compared to cities without resources.

== Release ==
The game was announced on May 24, 2002. It was released in stores on September 6 or October 5, 2002.

== Reception ==
The Wargamer called it a very enjoyable game, although they noted some glitches in components and gameplay.

=== Reviews ===
- Pyramid

=== Honors and awards ===
- Origins Awards Best Historical Board Game Winner (2002)
