= Civilization: The Card Game =

2006 card game

Civilization: The Card Game is a card game designed by Civilization IV lead designer Soren Johnson, based on Civilization IV. It was developed in 2006 by Firaxis Games, as a bonus in the Sid Meier's Civilization Chronicles boxed set (a collection of every Civilization series game up to that point), and is not available independently.

== Overview ==
Civilization: The Card Game simulates the rise of empires as in the computer game Civilization. Players will collect resources, obtain plots of land, construct Buildings and Wonders, discover Technologies, and fight each other on their way to victory. The game ends when the final Technology is bought. The player with the most Victory Points (one each per Wonder, Technology, and Population) is declared the Winner, with tiebreakers found in number of technologies, and then number of populations acquired, and then the number of Wonders.

== Gameplay ==
=== Card Types ===
Plot Cards provide the basis for the game's economy. The cards each show a symbol ("Coin" for commerce, "Hammer" for production, and "Wheat" for food) and a number. Each turn, players will get the yield specified on each card plus bonuses for population cards on that plot. Players begin with four plot cards, but additional plot cards can be purchased for 15 resources (any combination of the three resources totaling 15) for the fifth plot, and then increasing by an additional 5 resources thereafter. (The sixth plot costs 20, seventh 25, and so on). Each plot may hold one "building" card (i.e. Library, Forge, Pyramids) unless the player has the Engineering technology or three Population Cards on that plot, in which case it can hold two Buildings. At any given time, there should be three plot cards shown face up that are available for purchase.

Resource Cards are used to purchase things in game. Food is used to purchase new population cards, Hammers are for purchasing buildings and wonders, and Commerce (coins) are for purchasing new technologies. Any resource combination may be used to purchase new plots of land. Resources may be traded with the bank at a 3:1 ratio. Resources are also found on cards drawn from the play deck, and are used in the same manner as regular resource cards.

Population Cards represent the population of a player's empire. Each population card is worth one victory point. Population cards are assigned to individual plots and remain there until either the end of the game or until they are stolen away in combat. Each population card is purchased at an escalating price relative to the plot it's for. A plot with no population cards may add a population card for 6 food, a second for 8, a third for 10, and so on. There are no rules about evenly distributing populations and it is entirely possible to put all populations onto the same card. When plot resource yields are calculated, each population card provides one additional resource of a type that the plot could produce. Thus, a plot with three population that produces 1 Food and 1 Hammer will produce an additional combination of Food and Hammers totaling to three. (2 Foods & 1 Hammer, 3 Foods, etc.). Having three or more populations on a plot also allows the plot to hold two buildings.

Technology Cards Technology Cards each count as one victory point and provide bonuses or additional functionalities that are exclusive to the player that purchased the Technology. Engineering, for example, allows a player to place two buildings on every plot regardless of the number of population cards on it. Mining allows a one-time bonus of one production per plot.

Military Cards Military Cards are drawn from the deck and are only used to either attack another player during the Combat step, or in response to another player attacking you during their Combat step. They are kept hidden in a player's hand any other time. Each Military Card shows a specific type of unit found in the computer game, and specifies its traits. Some units (Archers, Spearmen, Axemen) can defend, and others (Chariot, Swordsmen, Spearmen, Axemen) can attack. Each card also specifies details about how it can participate in combat.

Building Cards Building cards are drawn from the deck and reflects a building found in the computer game. Each card has a purchase price that is paid in Hammers, and also an "effect" that happens once the building is purchased and placed on a plot of land. A Granary, for example, causes its plot to produce twice its base production of food. Other buildings, such as Libraries or Monasteries will grant the controller Culture points and/or reduce the cost of purchasing Technology cards. Buildings and Wonders are limited to one (total) per plot of land unless that plot has either 3 or more population or the player controls the Engineering technology. Buildings can be destroyed in combat by Swordsmen and Axemen. When destroyed, a building returns to its controller's hand and must be re-purchased to build it again.

Wonder Cards Wonder cards are drawn from the deck and reflect the wonders found in the computer game. Wonders are worth one victory point each. Like buildings, each wonder has a purchase price that is paid in Hammers, and an "effect" that happens once the Wonder is placed on a plot of land. Wonders cannot be destroyed by an opponent.

== Game Concepts ==
Victory Points are used for determining the winner of the game when the last technology is purchased. Victory points are granted one at a time by each population card, Wonder, and Technology owned and active. They are denoted by a light blue circle with a crown icon and a numeral "1" superimposed.

Culture is determined for each player by totaling up any technologies, wonders, and buildings they have that grant culture. Culture is denoted by a purple musical note symbol and a number specifying how many "culture points" it is worth. A player with the highest culture that is also greater than 2 receives the "Highest culture" status. "Highest Culture" lets a player draw and discard one additional card during their draw step.

Happiness is determined in a similar fashion to culture, but with yellow "happy face" icons instead of musical notes. Having the highest happiness score of all players (minimum 2) grants the "Highest Happiness" status, which reduces that players technology and building AND Wonder cost by 1.

== Game Setup ==
All cards should be separated into their respective groups and shuffled. Resource cards should be sorted and set aside, along with population cards.

=== Plot Cards ===
Beginning with the player to the left of the dealer, each player is dealt two Plot cards, face-up, randomly from the Plot card deck. Once those plots are dealt out, the dealer places a number of plot cards, one per player, in the middle of the play area face up. Beginning with the player to the left of the dealer, each player "drafts" one of the face up plots. Another set of plot cards are placed face-up on the table and this time the dealer drafts first and proceeds back in the opposite direction, with the player seated to the left of the Dealer receiving the last plot.

With plots distributed, three more plots are dealt face up but this time set aside. Three technology cards are now dealt face up and set aside, next to the land plots. These are all available for purchase during each player's turn. As each one is purchased, it should be replaced so that there are always three of each available. If there are less than three of either type remaining, then display the remaining cards of that type.

=== Population ===
Each player receives one free population card, to be placed on a plot of their own choosing.

=== Initial Hands ===
Beginning with the player to the left of the dealer, that player draws 6 cards from the play deck. The next player draws 7, the third player (if present) draws 8, and the fourth player (if present) draws 9. All players, in that same order, then immediately discard 2 of the cards drawn. Play begins with the player to the left of the Dealer.

== Turn Sequence ==
=== Collect Resource Cards ===
The current player first collects the yield shown on each of his plot cards. If there are any modifiers from buildings or technologies, those are collected. If the player has any populations on his cards, he may take one additional resource per population. The additional resource must be of a type produced by that plot. If there are multiple populations on one plot, the player may mix and match the bonus resources provided by populations provided that the total bonus equals the number of populations and that the resources are that which the plot can yield.

=== Purchasing ===
The current player may play buildings or wonders from their hand by paying the cost in hammers, minus any modifiers they may have due to technologies, happiness or wonders. The player may also choose to purchase a face up technology, additional population, or an additional plot of land.

Population: The player selects which plot they wish to add a population to. The cost for a new population is calculated as: 6 + 2P where "P" is the number of populations currently on that plot.

Plots of Land: The player first counts the number of plots they currently possess, and cost is determined by: 15 + 5(P - 4) where "P" is the number of plots they currently have.

Technology, Buildings, Wonders: Calculated by taking the base cost found on each individual card, and subtracting any bonuses from buildings, technologies, wonders, or "Highest Happiness".

=== Combat ===
The current player may optionally engage in combat with adjacent players. The attacking player may attack either adjacent player, or both, by sending at least one attacking unit at each defending player. Combat proceeds like this (Current player is called "Attacker". Players being attacked are referred to collectively as "Defenders". Players not being attacked do not participate in combat.):

1. Attacker declares which units are attacking (played from hand) and designates one defender for each attacker. A defender may be attacked by some or all of the units, and units do not need to be evenly distributed across defenders.
2. Resolve Walls:
  - If the Attacker is attacking with a catapult, and the defending player possesses city walls, the City Walls are destroyed (returned to the player's hand) and the catapult is discarded. This does not apply to the Great Wall. This may be repeated if the defender possesses more than one City Walls and the Attacker attacked with more than one catapult.
  - If any City Walls remain or a defender has the Great Wall in play, that defender chooses one attacking unit "~~per City Walls they still have in play~~" and that unit is "bounced" back to the attackers hand for the duration of the attacker's turn. ~~Repeat this for each City Walls and/or Great Wall that the defender has~~. City Walls remain in play even after "bouncing" an attacking unit.
3. Beginning with the first defender to the attacker's left, each defender plays any defending units from their hand. All defense assignments must be legal (i.e. Swordsman cannot defend at all, and Spearmen cannot defend against anything other than Chariots). The defender may choose not to defend the attackers and accept the full brunt of the attack -- players are not required to defend. Players may not play more defenders than necessary, nor may they defend for other players.
4. Once all defenders have played their defending units (if any), all attacking units that are blocked by defending units, as well as the defending units themselves, are all discarded from combat to the discard pile.
5. If there are any remaining attackers, follow the instructions on the card to determine the damage. Some units steal population, others destroy buildings. In either case, it is the defender's choice how the damage is applied. (i.e. they choose which population is stolen and which building is destroyed, if any) Destroyed building are returned to the defender's hand, stolen populations are given to the attacker. The attacker determines on which plot the new populations are placed. If an attacking unit has abilities that cannot be executed (such as "Destroy a Building" against a player with no buildings remaining) the unit performs what it can and ignores any impossible instructions.
6. After combat, all units that participated in combat are now discarded to the discard pile.

=== Draw and Discard ===
The player declares the end of their turn, draws 4 cards from the Play Deck and adds them to their hand. Then, they review their hand in its entirety and discard two cards from it to the discard pile. The Astronomy technology allows an additional card to be drawn. Highest Culture allows an additional card to be drawn, at the cost of also discarding an additional card.

== Discrepancies and unclear rules ==
Some of the cards or rules are unclear about their implementation, and currently no rules errata exists and no word is available from Soren Johnson, Firaxis, or 2k Games that any errata is forthcoming.

=== Writing and Code of Laws ===
Cards such as Writing (Steal one random card from opponent's hand) and Code of Laws (Steal three resources from an opponent) make no provisions about when they can be played. It can be assumed that it's only OK to do these things during a player's own turn, but the rules are not explicit in this either way.
