= National Register of Historic Places listings in Franklin County, Idaho =

Location of Franklin County in Idaho

This is a list of the National Register of Historic Places listings in Franklin County, Idaho.

This is intended to be a complete list of the properties on the National Register of Historic Places in Franklin County, Idaho, United States. Latitude and longitude coordinates are provided for many National Register properties and districts; these locations may be seen together in a map.

There are 10 properties listed on the National Register in the county, including 1 National Historic Landmark. More may be added; properties and districts nationwide are added to the Register weekly.

This National Park Service list is complete through NPS recent listings posted May 23, 2025.

== Current listings ==
	Name on the Register	Image	Date listed	Location	City or town	Description
1	Bear River Battleground	Bear River Battleground	March 14, 1973 (#73000685)	Northwest of Preston off U.S. Route 91; 42°08′33″N 111°54′45″W	Preston	
2	Matthias Cowley House	Matthias Cowley House	July 19, 1976 (#76000673)	110 S. 100 East; 42°05′38″N 111°52′25″W	Preston	
3	Franklin City Hall	Franklin City Hall	November 19, 1991 (#91001716)	128 E. Main St. 42°01′02″N 111°47′57″W	Franklin	
4	Franklin Co-operative Mercantile Institution	Franklin Co-operative Mercantile Institution	November 19, 1991 (#91001717)	113 E. Main St. 42°01′03″N 111°48′00″W	Franklin	
5	Franklin County Courthouse	Franklin County Courthouse	September 27, 1987 (#87001585)	39 W. Oneida St. 42°05′45″N 111°52′38″W	Preston	
6	L.H. Hatch House	L.H. Hatch House	May 7, 1973 (#73000684)	125 E. Main St. 42°01′05″N 111°48′08″W	Franklin	
7	Oneida Stake Academy	Oneida Stake Academy	May 21, 1975 (#75000630)	90 E. Oneida St. 42°05′46″N 111°52′28″W	Preston	
8	Relic Hall	Relic Hall	January 11, 2001 (#00001627)	111 E. Main St. 42°01′03″N 111°48′00″W	Franklin	
9	U.S. Post Office – Preston Main	U.S. Post Office – Preston Main	March 16, 1989 (#89000135)	55 E. Oneida St. 42°05′47″N 111°52′28″W	Preston	
10	Weston Canyon Rock Shelter	Weston Canyon Rock Shelter	July 25, 1974 (#74000738)	Address Restricted	Weston	

== See also ==
- List of National Historic Landmarks in Idaho
- National Register of Historic Places listings in Idaho
