= Moson Kahni =

Moson Kahni was a wintering town used by the Northern Shoshone tribe during the 19th century. It is located within the Cache Valley, in parts of current-day Franklin and Preston, Idaho. In Shoshoni, Moson Kahni means "Home of the Lungs", a reference to the plentiful amounts of holocrystalline syeno-diorite, which appeared to look like lungs to the Shoshone. Moson Kahni is considered to be a major Shoshone shelter and permanent winter encampment for the tribe.

== In popular culture ==
In the turn-based strategy video game Civilization V, Moson Kahni appears as the capital of the playable Shoshone civilization for the Civilization V: Brave New World expansion pack.
