= Leonard C. Brostrom =

U.S. Army Medal of Honor recipient (1919–1944)

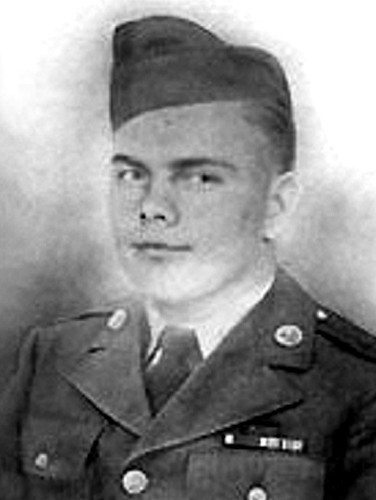
- Pfc. Leonard C. Brostrom, U.S. Army
- Born: November 23, 1919; Preston, Idaho, US
- Died: October 28, 1944 (aged 24); Dagami, Leyte, Philippines
- Burial place: Preston Cemetery, Preston, Idaho
- Military career
- Allegiance: United States of America
- Branch: United States Army
- Service years: 1942–1944
- Rank: Private First Class
- Units: F Company, 2nd Battalion, 17th Infantry Regiment, 7th Infantry Division
- Conflicts: World War II: Aleutian Islands campaign; Battle of Attu; Operation Cottage; Gilbert and Marshall Islands campaign; Battle of Kwajalein; Philippines campaign; Battle of Leyte †
- Awards: Medal of Honor; Purple Heart

Leonard C. Brostrom (November 23, 1919 – October 28, 1944) was a United States Army infantry soldier who was killed in action near Dagami, Leyte, Philippine Islands, now the Republic of the Philippines, during the Philippines Campaign of 1944–45, in World War II. He received the Medal of Honor posthumously for his heroic actions above and beyond the call of duty. Brostrom was a member of and served a mission for the Church of Jesus Christ of Latter-day Saints before he entered the Army.

== Biography ==
=== Early years ===
Brostrom was born on November 23, 1919, in Preston, Franklin County, Idaho. He was the first child of Carl John Brostrum (February 17, 1894 – March 13, 1975) and Louise Adolfina Hillstead (August 17, 1893 – September 25, 1961), who were married on August 21, 1918.

Brostrum grew up in the farming community of Preston, Idaho, and attended primary and secondary school at the Oneida Stake Academy, built by the Oneida Stake of the Church of Jesus Christ of Latter-day Saints (LDS Church). In 1922, this school was renamed Preston High School even though it was referred to as the Academy for some time thereafter. Nathan K. Van Noy, another Medal of Honor recipient, attended the newer Preston High School.

Brostrum attended church at the Oneida Ward in Preston. During the depression years, he farmed, hunted, and fished while doing odd jobs for both pocket money and LDS Church service. His younger brothers, Dean (1921–1999) and Dale (1925–2003), often tagged along until Leonard served a three-year LDS mission to California. Brostrum was on his church mission when Japan bombed Pearl Harbor on December 7, 1941. After successfully completing his mission, he returned home and joined the U.S. Army in March 1942.

=== Military service ===
7th Infantry Division shoulder sleeve insignia

Brostrom completed basic training at Fort Ord, California, and was assigned to the 7th Motorized Division. Shortly after arriving at Camp San Luis Obispo, the division began training in the Mojave Desert in preparation for its planned deployment to the African theater.

On January 1, 1943, the motorized division was renamed the 7th Infantry Division (light). Brostrom and the other soldiers began rigorous amphibious assault training under U.S. Marines from the Fleet Marine Force, before being deployed to fight in the Pacific theater instead of Africa. Marine General Holland Smith oversaw the 7th Division's training.

==== Aleutian Islands ====
Private Brostrom was assigned to F Company, 2nd Battalion, 17th Infantry Regiment, 7th Infantry Division and participated in the amphibious assaults and retaking of the Aleutian Islands, Eastern Mandates, and Leyte.

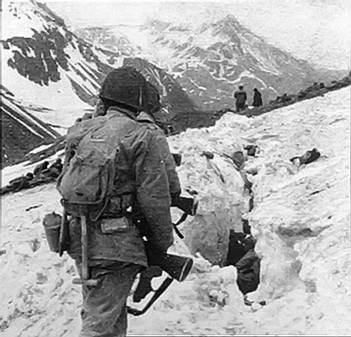
7th Infantry Division troops negotiate snow and ice during the battle on Attu in May 1943.

Brostrom first saw combat in the amphibious assault on Attu Island's "red beach", which was the westernmost Japanese entrenchment in the Aleutian Islands chain. He landed with his company on May 11, 1943, spearheaded by the 17th Infantry, and fought an intense battle over the tundra against strong Japanese resistance.

Brostrom and the rest of the soldiers from the 17th Infantry were not trained or properly equipped for Arctic combat on Attu, for in those days the U.S. Army knew practically nothing about waging extensive winter warfare. Nevertheless, Brostrom and his fellow soldiers from the regiment carried on. During the battle, Company F's attack in the pass between the valleys was magnificent. The GIs used rifles, bayonets, and hand grenades to drive the enemy out of a series of trenches near the vital Cold Mountain. The fight for the island culminated in a battle at Chichagof Harbor, where the 7th Infantry Division destroyed all Japanese resistance on the island on May 29, after a suicidal Japanese bayonet charge. The 17th Infantry then invaded Kiska expecting another serious fight, but Brostrom and the others of the regiment found out that the Japanese had evacuated the island prior to the American landing.

==== Eastern Mandates ====
The Eastern Mandates are part of the Marshall Islands where Brostrom and the 17th Infantry Division invaded Kwajalein atoll after four months of training in Hawaii. Under their new leader Major General C. H. Corlett, the amphibious assaults on the 42 islands of the atoll went "most nearly perfect". It is not certain which specific island (s) that F Company captured. The division returned to Hawaii for rest and recuperation, and then trained for the next assault.

==== Leyte ====
Leyte, the third-largest island of the Philippines, was invaded by the 7th Infantry Division on October 20, 1944. Brostrom in Company F, 2nd Battalion, 17th Infantry, attacked from the center, driving down the Dulag–Burauen Road. Within 48 hours, they had captured San Pablo, Burauen, and Bayug Airfield.

On October 27, 1944, the 17th Infantry took the strong points south of the town of Dagami. At 7:30 AM, 0730 hours in military time, Brostrum, "a lead scout" with F Company, struck out on the left flank of the attack. Their job with the rest of the 2nd Battalion was to envelop Dagami from the American left to pin and destroy Japanese Army resistance in the town.

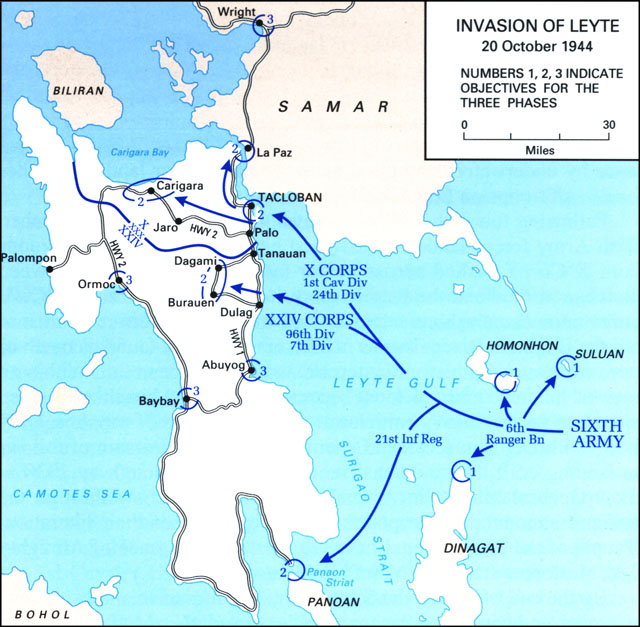
Invasion of Leyte map, October 1944

Brostrom with the lead assault platoon of F Company encountered "withering fire from pillboxes, trenches, and enemy spider holes". The Japanese soldiers were well entrenched and camouflaged. Enemy fields of fire were well calculated with criss-crossing machine gun bunkers supported by infantry in trenches. Pfc. Brostrom was hit by enemy weapon fire three times as he fought his way through a bamboo thicket that was part of the enemy line. Brostrom dashed to the rear of a large enemy machine gun bunker/pillbox. During his charge from the bamboo thicket, he was visible not only to the rest of his rifle company, but to the Japanese riflemen shooting at him as well. As he threw several grenades into the bunker, six Japanese infantrymen charged with fixed bayonets. Brostrom was able to kill one soldier and wound others, causing them to retreat. Brostrom was hit a fourth time and fell to the ground. Again, in view of the Americans and Japanese soldiers, he rose to his feet and assaulted the bunker with grenades and rifle fire. The Japanese soldiers ran out of the bunker as Brostrom fell seriously wounded.

Staff Sergeant Paul Doty and Pfc's Howard J. Evans and Eldridge V. Sorenson, who had caught up with Brostrom by this time, killed many of the fleeing enemy and called for a company medic. Brostrom was carried to the aid station but succumbed to his wounds.

During the same combat action and period, Pfc. John F. Thorson, from G Company, 2nd Battalion, 17th Infantry, attacked an enemy trench with his BAR and was within twenty feet when he was seriously wounded. The rest of Thorson's platoon rushed forward sweeping the enemy from the trench line. After an enemy grenade landed nearby, Thorson rolled on top of it to protect his comrades and was killed instantly.

Pfc. Brostrom, F Company, is one of the only two members of the 17th Infantry to have received the Medal of Honor for their actions in combat during the war. The other was Thorson.

Brostrom is buried in the Preston Cemetery.

== Medal of Honor citation ==
General Orders: War Department, General Orders No. 104 (November 15, 1945) Action Date: 28-Oct-44 Service: Army Rank: Private First Class Company: Company F Regiment: 17th Infantry Regiment Division: 7th Infantry Division

Citation:

He was a rifleman with an assault platoon which ran into powerful resistance near Dagami, Leyte, Philippine Islands, on 28 October 1944. From pillboxes, trenches, and spider holes, so well camouflaged that they could be detected at no more than 20 yards, the enemy poured machinegun and rifle fire, causing severe casualties in the platoon. Realizing that a key pillbox in the center of the strong point would have to be knocked out if the company were to advance, Pfc. Bostrom, without orders and completely ignoring his own safety, ran forward to attack the pillbox with grenades. He immediately became the prime target for all the riflemen in the area, as he rushed to the rear of the pillbox and tossed grenades through the entrance. Six enemy soldiers left a trench in a bayonet charge against the heroic American, but he killed 1 and drove the others off with rifle fire. As he threw more grenades from his completely exposed position he was wounded several times in the abdomen and knocked to the ground. Although suffering intense pain and rapidly weakening from loss of blood, he slowly rose to his feet and once more hurled his deadly missiles at the pillbox. As he collapsed, the enemy began fleeing from the fortification and were killed by riflemen of his platoon. Pfc. Brostrom died while being carried from the battlefield, but his intrepidity and unhesitating willingness to sacrifice himself in a l-man attack against overwhelming odds enabled his company to reorganize against attack, and annihilate the entire enemy position.

== Military awards ==
Pfc. Brostrom's decorations and awards include:

== Brostrom's MOH journey ==
In the early 1950s, Brostrom's Medal of Honor was donated by his family to the Franklin County Courthouse in Preston, where it was displayed with his picture and a few mementos.

When a new set of county commissioners decided to remove the display cases, the local American Legion post then displayed Brostrom's Medal of Honor. In time, local veterans dwindled and the Legion Hall was taken over by the County. The last commander of the Preston American Legion Chapter in Preston then took Brostrom's display home for safe keeping. By this time, all of Brostrom's family had died except for a niece, who did not want the Medal of Honor display, citing that she would not be able to preserve it properly. A local lawyer, Jay McKenzie, was asked to keep the display safe in his office. The medal sat there until a retired U.S. Army lieutenant colonel, Sherman L. Fleek, who was then the command historian for the United States Military Academy at West Point and doing research on Pfc. Brostrom's life, called McKenzie. This eventually led to a discussion of how to properly honor Brostrom and display his Medal of Honor. Since Brostrom had been a lifetime member of the Church of Jesus Christ of Latter-day Saints, the Church History Library was contacted and agreed to preserve and display the medal there.

Brostrom is one of five members of the Church of Jesus Christ of Latter-day Saints to have received the Medal of Honor during World War II including another former Preston resident, Nathan K. Van Noy.

== Legacy ==
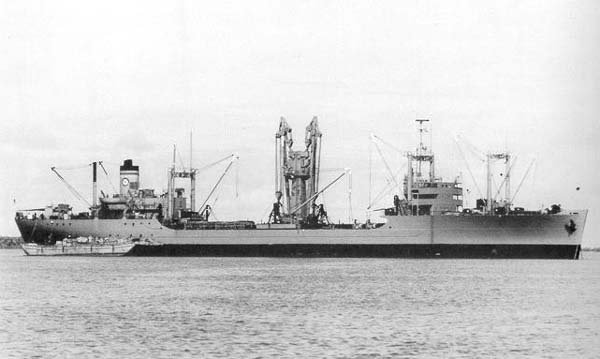
USNS Pvt. Leonard C. Brostrom (T-AK-255)

A United States Army transport ship, USAT Private Leonard C. Brostrom, was named after Brostrom in 1948.

The ship was built in 1943, for the United States Maritime Commission as SS Marine Eagle, a Type C4-S-B1 tank carrier, by Sun Shipbuilding. In March 1948, the Marine Eagle was transferred to the United States Army and renamed USAT Private Leonard C. Brostrom. In August 1950, during the Korean War, the ship was transferred to the Military Sea Transport Service of the U.S. Navy as USNS Pvt. Leonard C. Brostrom (T-AK-255), a United States Naval Ship staffed by a civilian crew. During the Vietnam War, the ship transferred cargo to South Vietnam. In early 1980, the USNS Pvt. Leonard C. Brostrom (T-AK-255) was placed out of service and entered the National Defense Reserve Fleet in California the following May. In June 1982, the ship was sold for scrapping.

== See also ==
- List of Medal of Honor recipients for World War II
