= Weston Canyon Rock Shelter =

- U.S. National Register of Historic Places
- Location: Address restricted, vicinity of Weston, Idaho
- Area: less than one acre
- NRHP reference No.: 74000738
- Added to NRHP: July 25, 1974

The Weston Canyon Rock Shelter, located in Franklin County, Idaho in the vicinity of Weston, Idaho is a historic site listed on the National Register of Historic Places in 1974.

The site was investigated in archeology study in 1969 and 1970. The site shows association with the Great Basin culture, with northwestern Great Plains culture, and with Rocky Mountain culture. Its earliest occupation was deemed to be approximately 7000–3500 years ago, relative to the 1970s, and it was believed the rockshelter was inhabited continuously into the 1800s.
