= Civilization V: Brave New World =

- Developer: Firaxis Games
- Publishers: 2K Games (Windows); Aspyr (OS X, Linux)
- Designer: Ed Beach
- Series: Civilization
- Platforms: Microsoft Windows, Mac OS X, Linux
- Release: NA: July 9, 2013; WW: July 12, 2013
- Genres: Turn-based strategy, 4X
- Modes: Single-player, multiplayer

Sid Meier's Civilization V: Brave New World is the second official expansion pack for the turn-based strategy video game Civilization V. It was released on July 9, 2013, in North America and on July 12, 2013, in the rest of the world.

== Gameplay ==
The expansion adds nine Civilizations, eight Wonders (the Parthenon, Broadway, Globe Theatre, Borobudur, the Uffizi, the Red Fort, Prora and the International Space Station), eight buildings, twenty units, two scenarios (American Civil War and Scramble for Africa), a new Trade Route system using Caravans and Cargo Ships trade units, Ideologies, the World Congress, which expands the diplomatic aspect of the game, and an improved Cultural Victory including Tourism, Archaeology and a Great Work mechanic to the core game. Thus, the Great Artist, along with the Great Musician and Great Writer, has undergone significant changes with the aforementioned features. The expansion pack includes and expands on all the mechanics of Gods & Kings. Brave New World reintroduces Christianity to split into three religion branches, Catholicism, Eastern Orthodoxy and Protestantism.

Social policies have been overhauled in Brave New World with the introduction of the new ideology system. Once players reach the Modern era or complete three factories, they must choose an ideology to continue the game. There are three available ideologies: Order, Freedom, and Autocracy, which were previously the Industrial era social policies. Each ideology consists of 16 unique tenets that unlock and provide bonuses similar to the social policies in the core game. To replace the former policies turned ideologies, two new social policy trees have been added: Aesthetics, which focuses on culture, and Exploration, which emphasizes naval activities. Additionally, the Piety policy tree has been updated to exclusively deal with religion.

The diplomatic gameplay aspect has been improved in the expansion. With the introduction of the world congress, beginning in the Renaissance era upon one civilization discovering printing press and meeting every other civilization, proposals can be voted on that influence the conditions within the world, trade embargoes, as well as world activities such as the World's fair. In order to achieve the diplomatic victory, one must be voted the world leader at a World Congress meeting.

The cultural victory has also changed with the introduction of tourism. Tourism is achieved by creating great works of art, music, and writing. A civilization's tourism output must be greater than every other civilization's culture output to achieve the cultural victory.

In addition, The Statue of Zeus, previously released in the Seven Wonders of the Ancient World DLC, is included in the game.

== New civilizations ==
Brave New World adds nine playable civilizations and leaders: Casimir III of Poland, Ashurbanipal of Assyria, Pedro II of Brazil, Shaka of the Zulus, Maria I of Portugal, Gajah Mada of Indonesia, Ahmad al-Mansur of Morocco, Enrico Dandolo of Venice, and Pocatello of the Shoshone. Additionally, Haile Selassie of Ethiopia, previously released in the first expansion, is included along with the nine new civilizations for those who did not purchase Gods & Kings.

The developers stated that they wanted to include civilizations from parts of the world less commonly represented, namely Africa (Zulu, Morocco) and South America (Brazil). Other new civilizations were added to provide players with a more "interesting gameplay experience", many of them showcasing the gameplay features new to Brave New World; for example, players as Portugal or Venice are encouraged to make use of the new trading route system.

Nineteen new city states were added to replace old city states that were merged into their civilization counterpart. The new city states include Riga, Vancouver, and Kyiv.

== Reception ==
Reception

Aggregate scores
Aggregator	Score
GameRankings	85.78%
Metacritic	85

Review scores
Publication	Score
GameSpot	9.5/10
IGN	9.4/10
PC Gamer (US)	88/100

Critical response to Brave New World has been positive.

GameSpot gave the game a 9.5/10 praising its gameplay that allows for varied play styles and new mechanics.

PC Gamer gave the game an 88/100, calling it "A recipe for hundreds of hours more delicious turn-based strategy." The reviewer praised the game's modification to later eras and victory conditions.

IGN gave the game a score of 9.4/10, calling it the "best Civilization expansion so far" that "takes the dangling threads of Gods & Kings and brings them to their full potential." The review went on to praise the new mechanics such as tourism and ideologies for removing the late-game tedium and allowing for more complex and flexible strategies.

The Game Scouts gave Brave New World a 9/10, saying "Brave New World shows me that Sid Meier and the development teams responsible for the Civilization franchise aren't resting on their laurels."

During the 17th Annual D.I.C.E. Awards, the Academy of Interactive Arts & Sciences nominated Brave New World for "Strategy/Simulation Game of the Year".
