= Preston Main Post Office =

- US Post Office--Preston Main
- U.S. National Register of Historic Places
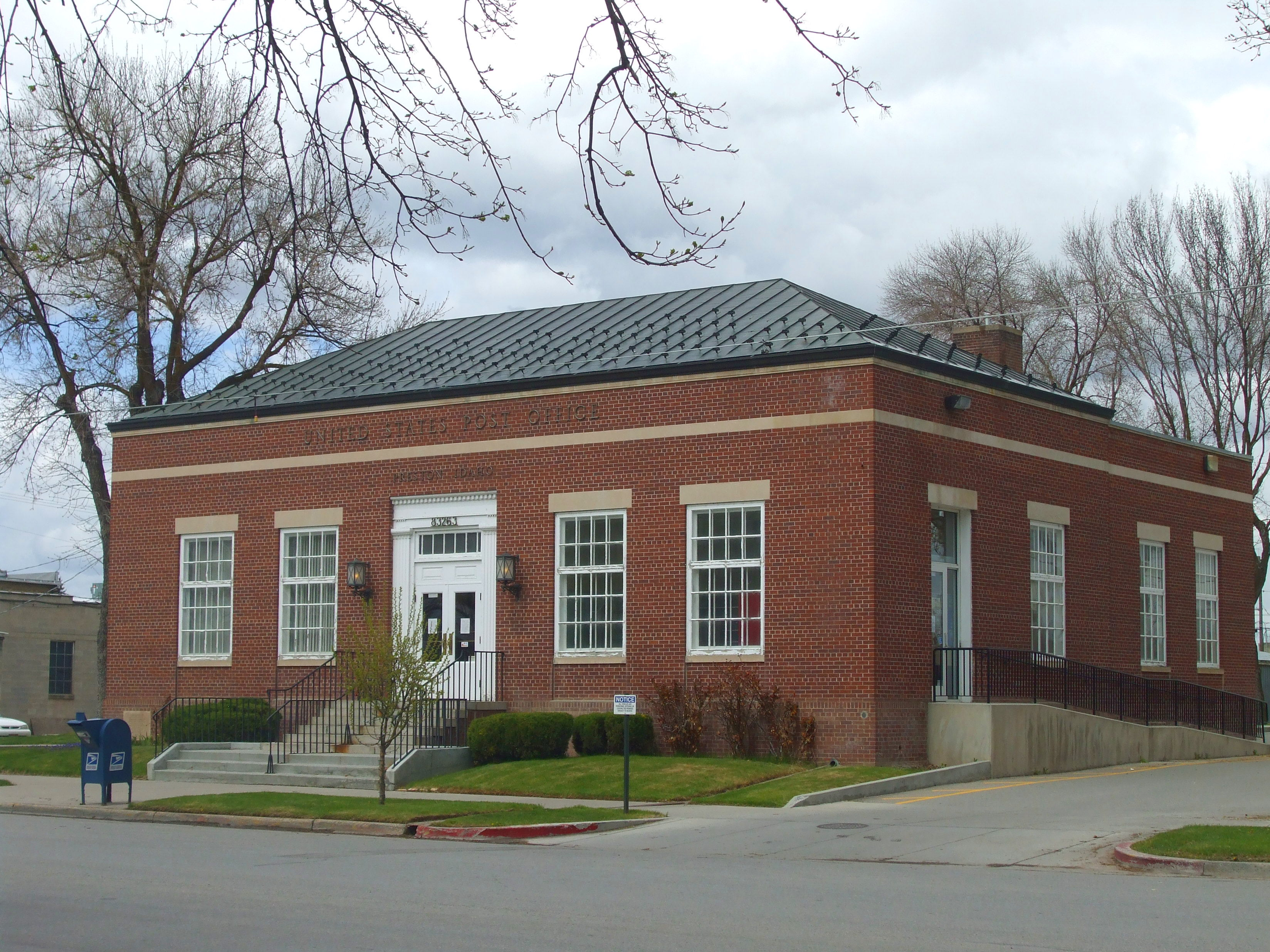

- Location within Idaho Location within the United States
- Location: 55 E. Oneida St., Preston, Idaho
- Coordinates: 42°5′47″N 111°52′28″W
- Area: 0.7 acres (0.28 ha)
- Built: 1940
- Architect: Office of the Supervising Architect under Louis A. Simon
- Architectural style: Classical Revival
- MPS: US Post Offices in Idaho 1900--1941 MPS
- NRHP reference No.: 89000135
- Added to NRHP: March 16, 1989

The Preston Main Post Office, located at 55 E. Oneida St. in Preston, Idaho, was built in 1940. It was listed on the National Register of Historic Places in 1989 as US Post Office-Preston Main.

Its Classical Revival design is credited to Louis A. Simon.

The interior includes a New Deal mural depicting U.S. cavalry attacking and burning a Native American village, titled "The Battle of Bear River". The approximately 5 by 12 feet (1.5 m × 3.7 m) mural was painted by Edmond J. Fitzgerald in 1941.
