= Matthias Cowley House =

Historic house in Preston, Idaho

- U.S. National Register of Historic Places
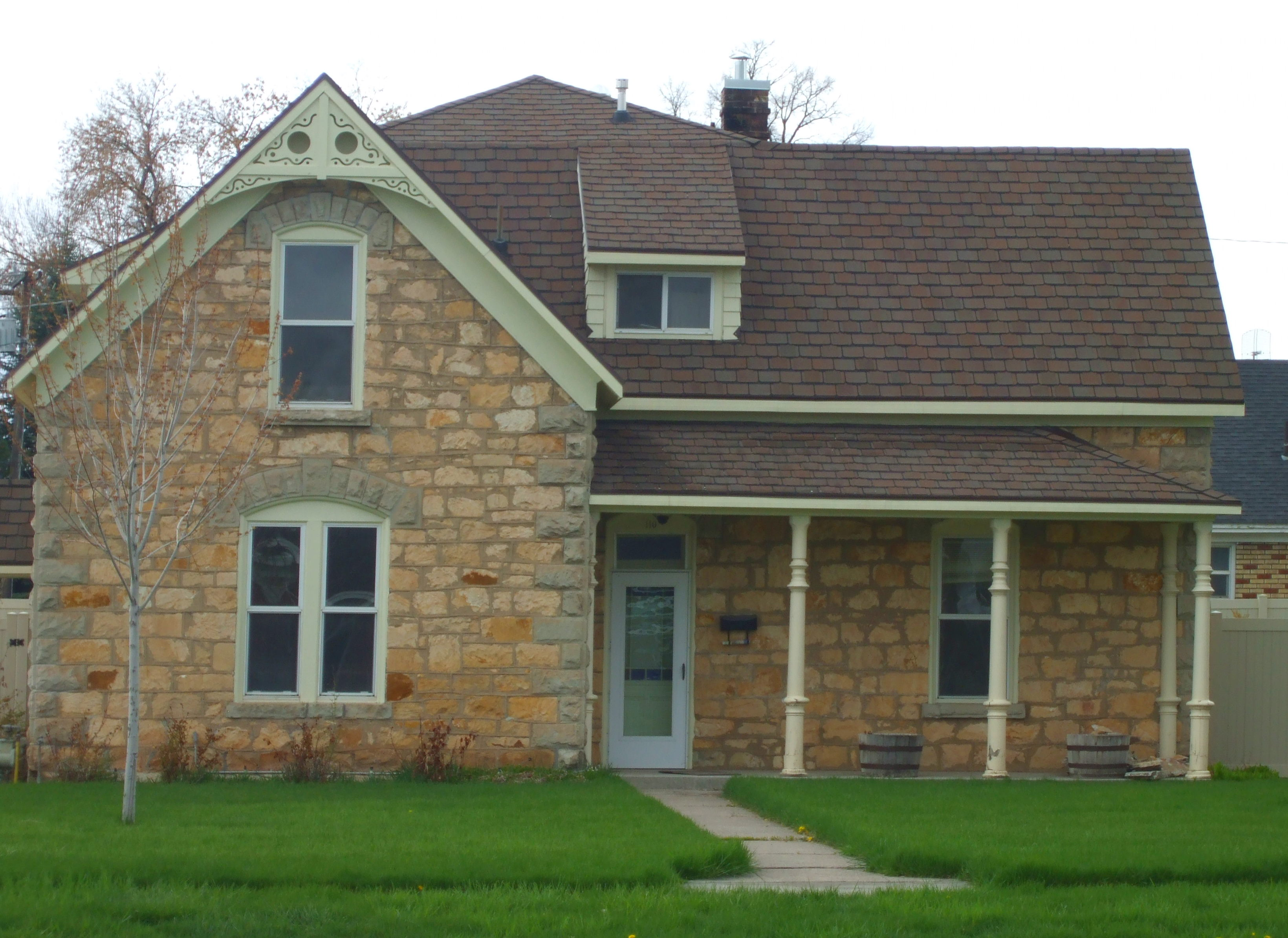

- Location within Idaho Location within the United States
- Location: 110 S. 1st St. East, Preston, Idaho
- Coordinates: 42°5′38″N 111°52′25″W
- Area: less than one acre
- Built: 1895
- NRHP reference No.: 76000673
- Added to NRHP: July 19, 1976

The Matthias Cowley House, located at 110 S. 1st St. East in Preston, Idaho, United States, was built in 1895. It was listed on the National Register of Historic Places in 1976.

Its NRHP nomination describes it as "a recognizable example of late nineteenth century Mormon residential architecture in which local stone was employed in construction of symmetrical, one and a half story substantial dwellings." Cowley's house has a T-shaped floor plan and, "as was customary for plural marriage families, his house had more than one front doorway."
