= USNS Private Leonard C. Brostrom =

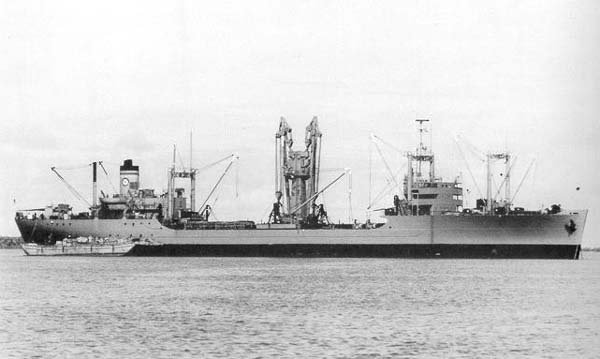
- USNS Private Leonard C. Brostrom (T-AK-255)

History
- Name: SS Marine Eagle
- Owner: United States Maritime Commission
- Operator: American Hawaiian Steamship Company
- Port of registry: (United States) Philadelphia, Pennsylvania
- Builder: Sun Shipbuilding; Chester, Pennsylvania
- Yard number: 340
- Laid down: 5 December 1942
- Launched: 10 May 1943
- Sponsored by: Mrs. R. M. Stevenson
- Completed: 18 September 1943
- Out of service: 29 October 1946
- Fate: laid up in NDRF, October 1946

History

United States
- Name: USAT Private Leonard C. Brostrom
- Namesake: Leonard C. Brostrom
- Acquired: 27 March 1948
- Out of service: 3 March 1950
- Fate: laid up in NDRF, Match 1950

History

United States
- Name: USNS Private Leonard C. Brostrom
- Acquired: 27 March 1948
- Out of service: 1980
- Fate: laid up in NDRF, May 1980; sold for scrapping, June 1982

General characteristics (as USNS Private Leonard C. Brostrom)
- Type: Type C4-S-B1 ship
- Displacement: 22,094 long tons (22,449 t) (full)
- Length: 520 ft (160 m)
- Beam: 72 ft (22 m)
- Draft: 33 ft (10 m)
- Speed: 17 knots (31 km/h)
- Complement: 51

USNS Private Leonard C. Brostrom (T-AK–255) was a cargo ship for the United States Navy that was converted into a heavy lift cargo ship in the early 1950s. She was built in 1943 for the United States Maritime Commission as SS Marine Eagle, a Type C4-S-B1 tank carrier, by Sun Shipbuilding during World War II. In 1948, she was transferred to the United States Army as USAT Private Leonard C. Brostrom after Leonard C. Brostrom, a recipient of the Medal of Honor. In 1950, the ship was transferred to the Military Sea Transport Service of the U.S. Navy as a United States Naval Ship staffed by a civilian crew. After ending her naval service, she entered the National Defense Reserve Fleet in October 1980 and was sold for scrapping in June 1982.

== Career ==
Marine Eagle (MC hull 735) was laid down by the Sun Shipbuilding and Dry Dock Company of Chester, Pennsylvania under a United States Maritime Commission contract on 5 December 1942 and launched 10 May 1943 sponsored by Mrs. R. M. Stevenson. The ship was delivered to the War Shipping Administration on 18 September 1943 for operation by its agent the American-Hawaiian Steamship Company allocated to Army requirements.

Marine Eagle, the only C4 completed as originally intended, as a tank carrier, operated between New York and European ports until July 1945. During those 18 months she completed nine eastbound Atlantic crossings to the United Kingdom and, after the Normandy invasion, French and Belgian ports. Departing Antwerp on 10 July 1945, she sailed to Panama, instead of New York, then headed out across the Pacific. For the next nine months she carried cargo to the Philippines, then, in March 1946, returned to the west coast. In May, she steamed to Portland, Oregon, for inactivation overhaul, after which she was laid up in the National Defense Reserve Fleet (NDRF) at Olympia, Washington, on 29 October.

The ship was reactivated on 27 March 1948 with title transferred to the Army Transportation Service which renamed the ship Private Leonard C. Brostrom, a Medal of Honor recipient for his actions in the Philippines in October 1944. After two years service, however, the ship was returned, on 3 March 1950, to the NDRF at Olympia.

Private Leonard C. Brostrom was reactivated again, 9 August 1950, transferred to Navy custody and designated T–AK–255. Originally assigned to Military Sea Transport Service, Atlantic, she was converted for heavy lift in 1953–54 by the Bethlehem Steel Company of Brooklyn, New York. Transferred to the Pacific after conversion, the cargo ship sailed to the Far East to begin cargo operations under ComMSTSFE. Private Leonard C. Brostrom continued heavy lift operations through the 1960s and 1970s, carrying such diverse cargoes as chemical weapons to Okinawa for Project Red Hat in 1963 through 1964, a 101-long-ton (103 t) turbo-electric power plant, several 85-long-ton (86 t) diesel-electric locomotives (85 t. ea.), a 116-long-ton (118 t) turbine-generator car, and a 110-long-ton (110 t) IMODCO tanker mooring buoy from Yokohama to Taiwan.

Private Leonard C. Brostrom was removed from service in 1980 and entered into the NDRF at Suisun Bay, California on 29 May. She was sold for scrapping on 8 June 1982.

== See also ==
- Type C4 class ship

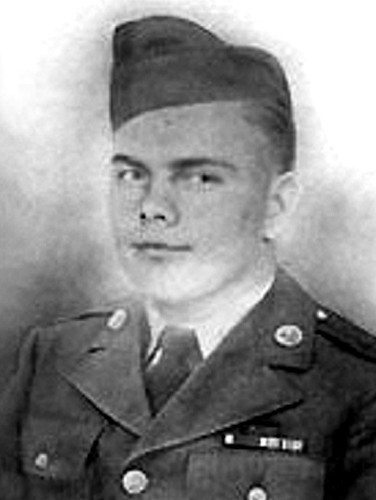
PFC Leonard Brostrom, US Army photo released 1945.

== Bibliography ==
- Grover, David (1987). U.S. Army Ships and Watercraft of World War II. Naval Institute Press. ISBN 0-87021-766-6. LCCN 87015514.
- Maritime Administration. "Marine Eagle". Ship History Database Vessel Status Card. U.S. Department of Transportation, Maritime Administration. Archived from the original on April 18, 2015.
- Naval History And Heritage Command. "Private Leonard C. Brostrom". Dictionary of American Naval Fighting Ships. Naval History And Heritage Command.
- Priolo, Gary P. (21 September 2007). "USNS PVT. Leonard C. Brostrom (T-AK-255)". NavSource.
