= Preston Joint School District 201 =

School district in Idaho, United States

Address
- 120 East 2nd South Street Preston, Idaho, 83263; United States

District information
- Type: Public
- Grades: PreK–12
- NCES District ID: 1600960

Students and staff
- Students: 2,468 (2022-23)
- Teachers: 129.93
- Staff: 97.13
- Student–teacher ratio: 18.16

Other information
- Website: www.psd201.org

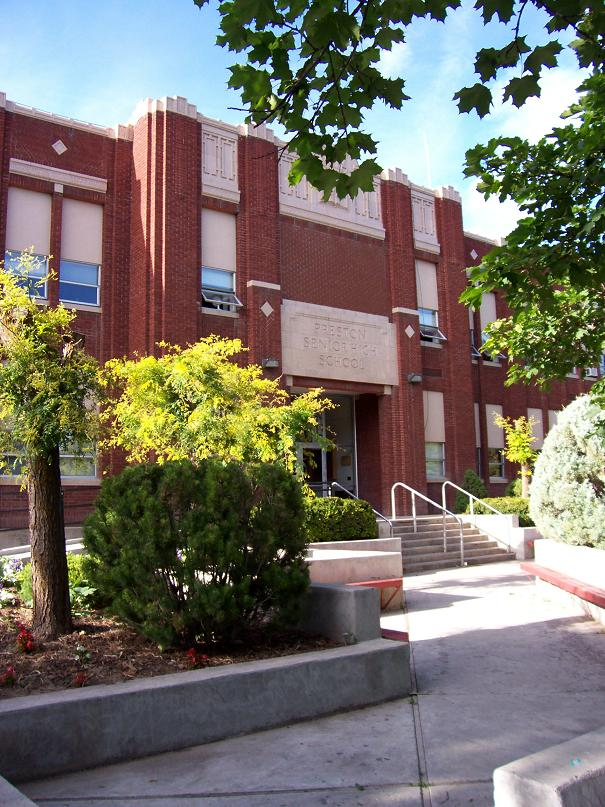
Preston High School

Preston Joint School District 201 is the school district of Preston, Idaho.

== Schools ==
- Preston High School
- Preston Junior High School
- Oakwood Elementary School
- Pioneer Elementary School
- Franklin County High School
