= Franklin Historic Properties =

Franklin Historic Properties is a historical site operated by the Idaho State Historical Society in Franklin, Idaho. The site consists of the L. H. Hatch House, the Relic Hall, and Franklin Cooperative Mercantile Institution, which were separately listed on the National Register of Historic Places in 1973, 2001, and 1991 respectively.

== Hatch House ==
- L. H. Hatch House
- U.S. National Register of Historic Places
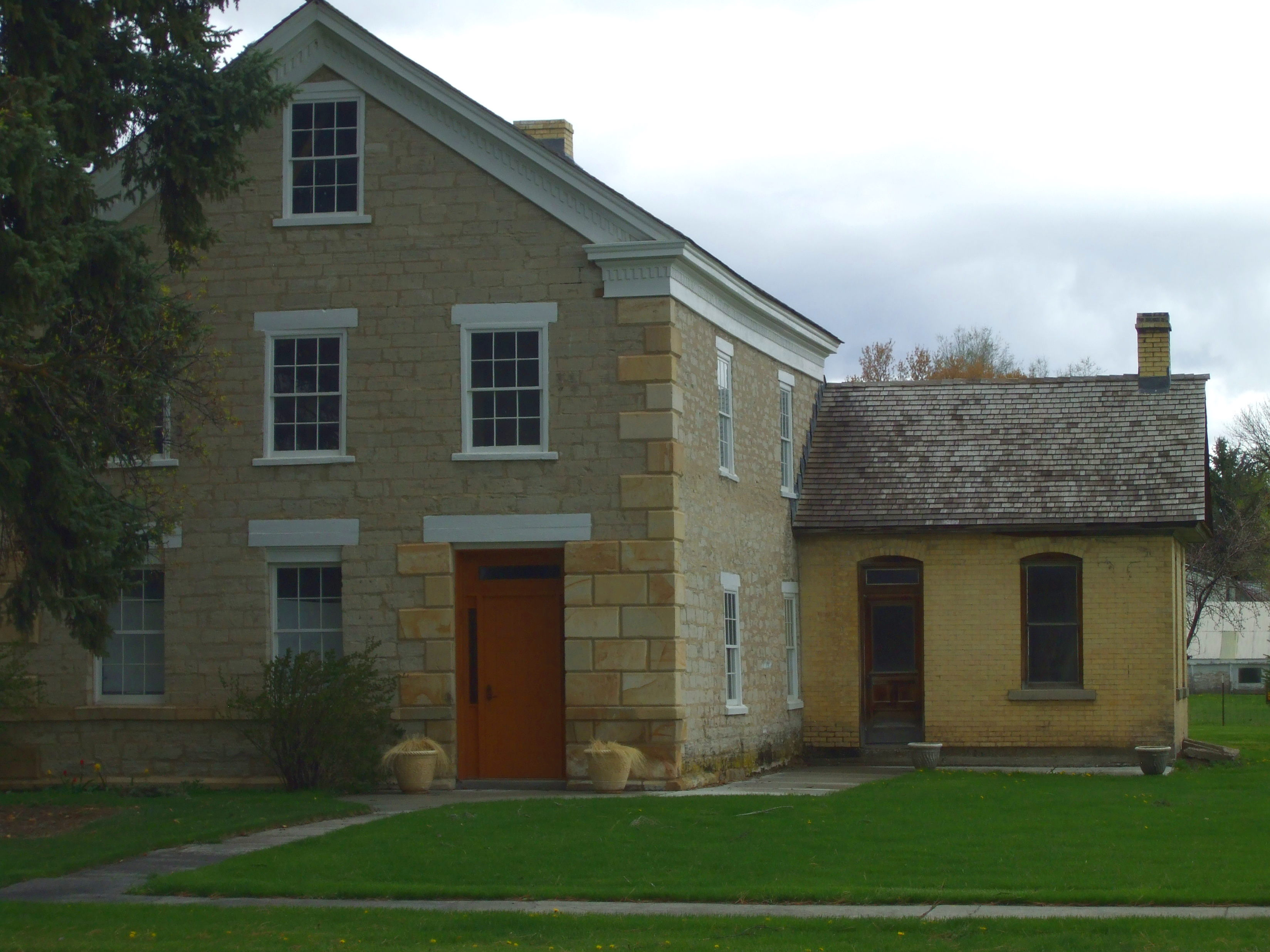

- Location within Idaho Location within the United States
- Location: 125 E. Main St., Franklin, Idaho
- Coordinates: 42°1′5″N 111°48′8″W
- Built: 1874
- Architectural style: Greek Revival
- NRHP reference No.: 73000684
- Added to NRHP: May 7, 1973

The L. H. Hatch House is a two-story stone Greek Revival house. Its design features the typical street-facing gable end and three-bay front facade; details include stone quoins at the corners and decorative woodwork. The house was constructed in 1874, after the Greek Revival's height of popularity in America, and is one of the best-preserved examples of the style in Idaho.

== Relic Hall ==
- Relic Hall
- U.S. National Register of Historic Places
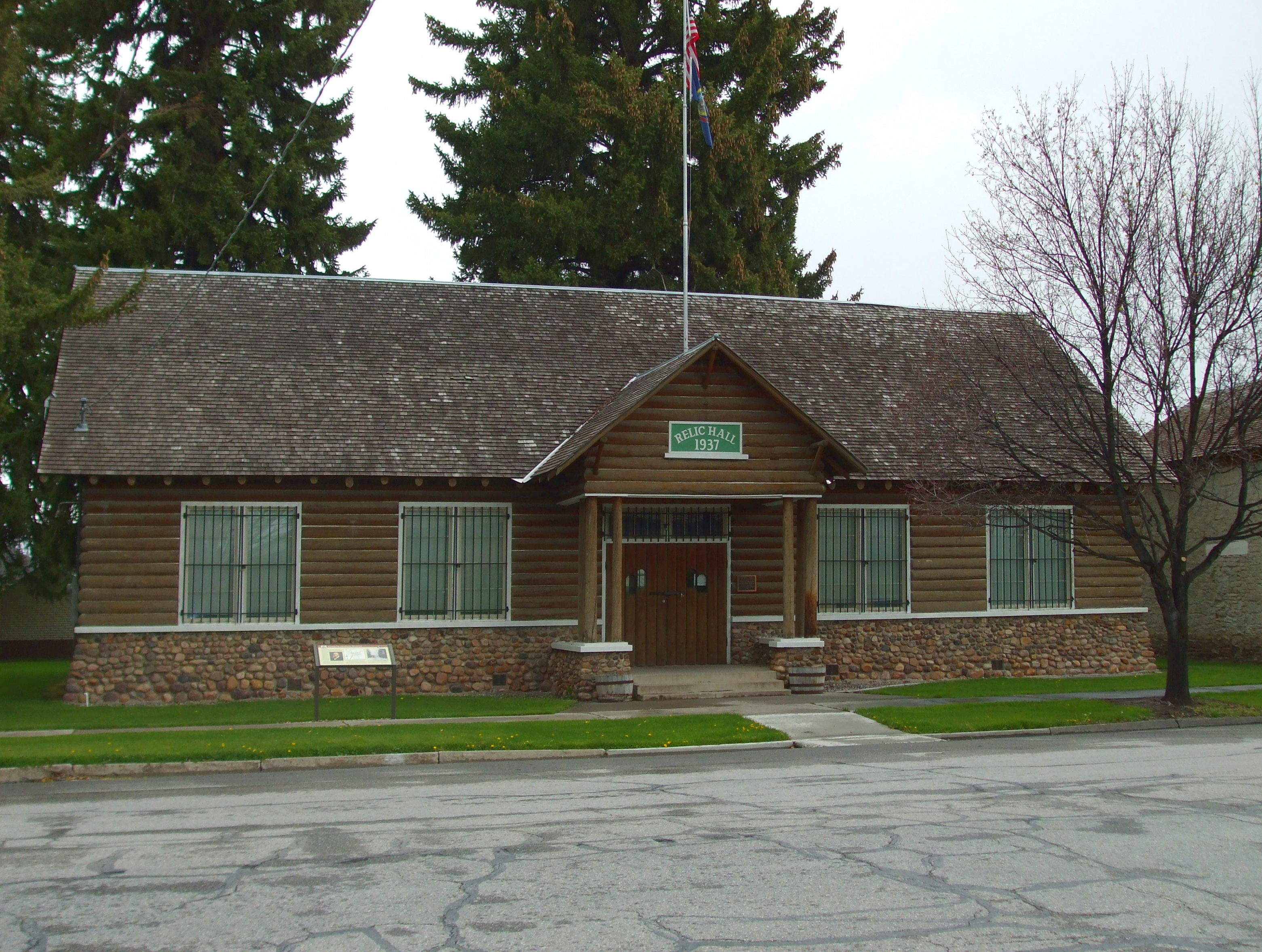
- Location: 111 E. Main St., Franklin, Idaho
- Coordinates: 42°1′3″N 111°48′0″W
- Built: 1937
- Architect: Chris Gunderson
- NRHP reference No.: 00001627
- Added to NRHP: January 11, 2001

The Relic Hall is a rustic-style building constructed in 1937. The Civilian Conservation Corps built the structure, and its design exhibits the typical log architecture used by the CCC; this design consists of a stone foundation, log walls, and a shingle roof with exposed rafters. The building houses a variety of historical collections; while the Idaho State Historical Society owns the building, the collections are administered by the Idaho Pioneer Association.

== Franklin Cooperative Mercantile Institution ==
- Franklin Cooperative Mercantile Institution
- U.S. National Register of Historic Places
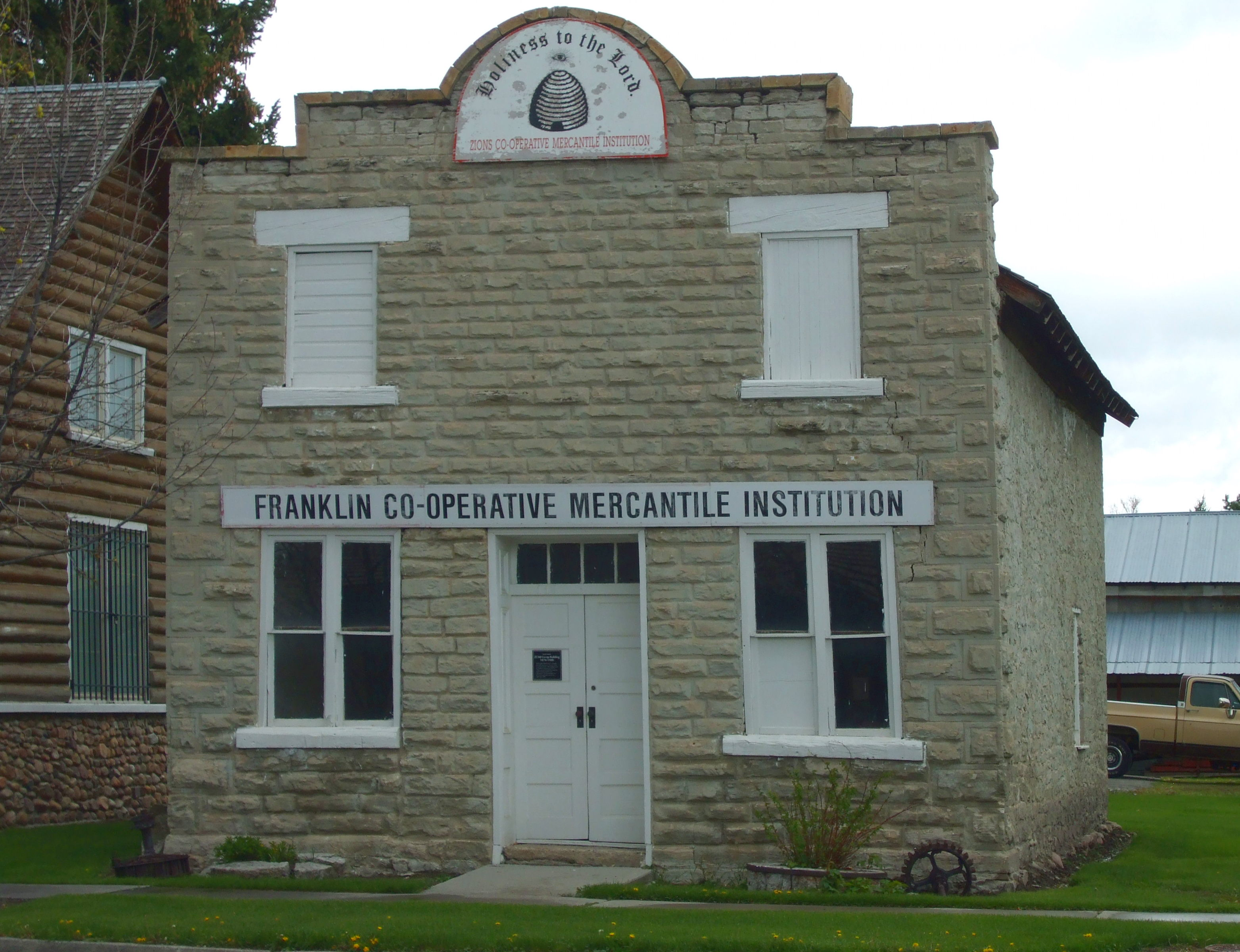
- Location: 113 E. Main St., Franklin, Idaho
- Coordinates: 42°1′3″N 111°48′0″W
- Built: 1869
- Architectural style: Greek Revival
- NRHP reference No.: 91001717
- Added to NRHP: November 19, 1991

The Franklin Cooperative Mercantile Institution, which was built in 1869, was a cooperative general store organized as part of a wider Mormon movement. The movement, which was centrally led by Mormon authorities, saw the opening of local general stores which received their goods both from wholesalers and community residents. The store building is a stone Greek Revival structure; while stone was a common building material during the Mormon settlement of Idaho, few of Franklin's early stone buildings survive. The cooperative store operated until the 1880s, when the cooperative movement faded and it was bought by a single owner. In 1923, the building became one of Idaho's first history museums and was the predecessor of the Relic Hall.
