= Franklin City Hall =

- U.S. National Register of Historic Places
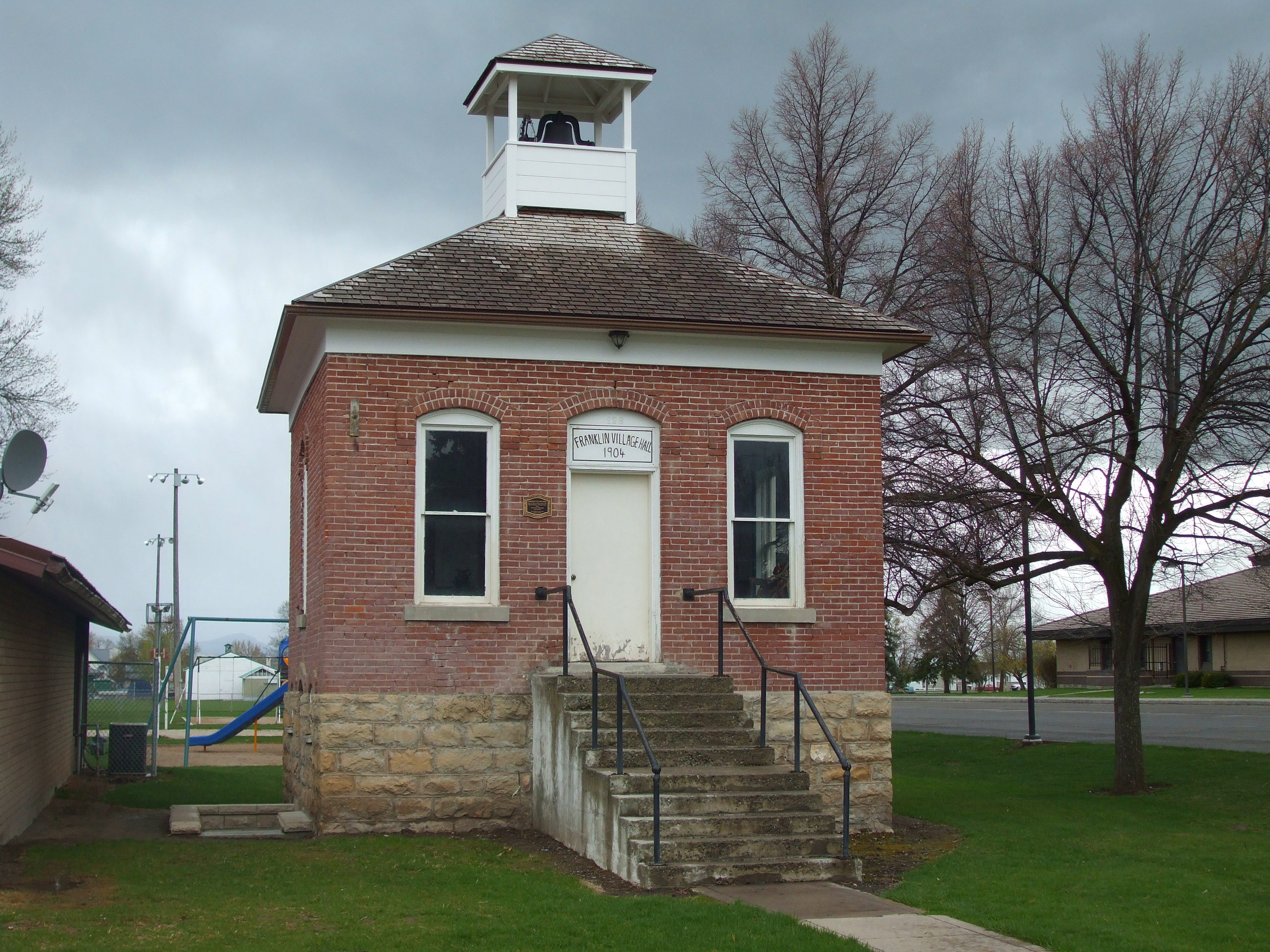

- Location within Idaho Location within the United States
- Location: 128 E. Main St., Franklin, Idaho
- Coordinates: 42°1′2″N 111°47′57″W
- Area: less than one acre
- Built: 1904
- Built by: Worley & Nelson
- Architect: Barrett, J.W.
- Architectural style: Colonial Revival, Italianate
- NRHP reference No.: 91001716
- Added to NRHP: November 19, 1991

The Franklin City Hall, located at 128 E. Main St. in Franklin, Idaho, was built in 1904. It was listed on the National Register of Historic Places in 1991.

It is a one-room one-story brick building. It was deemed "historically significant as a local manifestation of the gradual distinction between church and civil government that developed in Mormon political and religious thought during the turn-of-the-century period. The building is architecturally significant as an example of the transition from Italianate to Colonial Revival forms for institutional buildings in Idaho during the period between about 1890 and 1905. The building also reveals the stylistic preference for Colonial Revival forms in southeast Idaho's Mormon communities, a preference that existed throughout the first half of the twentieth century. The building provides a good example of early brickwork in the region."
