= Fairview, Franklin County, Idaho =

Unincorporated community in the state of Idaho, United States

Fairview
- Unincorporated community
- Location within Idaho Location within the United States
- Coordinates: 42°00′48″N 111°52′33″W
- Country: United States
- State: Idaho
- County: Franklin
- Elevation: 4,518 ft (1,377 m)
- Time zone: UTC-7 (Mountain (PST))
  - Summer (DST): UTC-6 (PDT)
- Postal code: 83263
- Area codes: 208, 986
- GNIS feature ID: 372646

Fairview is an unincorporated community located in Franklin County, Idaho, United States.
