= Preston High School (Idaho) =

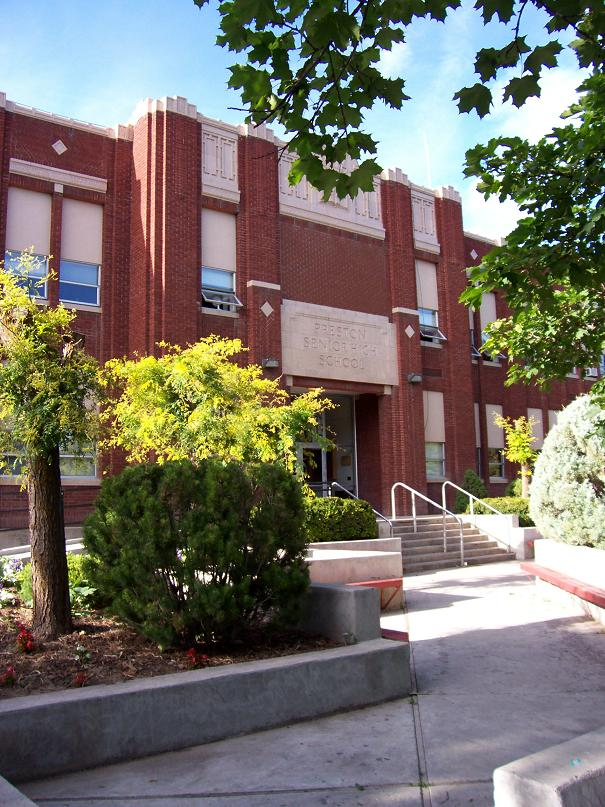
- Main entrance in 2006

Location
- 151 East 200 South; Preston, Idaho; United States; 42.0922°N 111.8725°W

Information
- Type: Public
- School district: Preston Joint School District 201
- NCES School ID: 160096000182
- Principal: Russ Lee
- Faculty: 36.56 (FTE)
- Grades: 9–12
- Enrollment: 723 (2023–2024)
- Student to teacher ratio: 19.78
- Colors: Blue, white, and gold
- Athletics: IHSAA Class 4A
- Athletics conference: Great Basin (East)
- Mascot: Indian
- Yearbook: Quiver
- Feeder schools: Preston Jr. High
- Elevation: 4,710 ft (1,440 m) AMSL
- Website: Preston High School

Preston High School is a four-year public secondary school in Preston, Idaho, the only traditional high school in the Preston School District #201. The school colors are blue, white, and gold and the mascot is a Native American.

The school was one of the primary filming locations for the 2004 hit movie Napoleon Dynamite; the film's director, Jared Hess, graduated from Preston in 1997.

== Athletics ==
Preston competes in athletics in IHSAA Class 4A in the 4A South East Idaho Conference with [American Falls High School American Falls and Bear Lake High School Montpelier, Idaho)Bear Lake of Montpelier. Snake River High School Snake River Longtime in Class A-2 and its successor 3A, Preston moved up to 4A in 2004.

=== State titles ===
Boys

- Football (1): fall (A-2, now 3A) 1993 (official with introduction of A-2 playoffs, fall 1978)
  - (unofficial poll titles - 0) (poll introduced in 1963, through 1977)
- Cross Country (4): fall (A-2, now 3A) 1994, 2000; (3A) 2001, 2002 (introduced in 1964)
- Basketball (9): (A, now 5A) 1946; (A-2, now 3A) 1968, 1989, 1990; (3A) 2001, 2003 (4A) 2016, 2017, 2018, 2020, 2025
- Wrestling (1): (A-2, now 3A) 1979 (introduced in 1958)

Girls

- Cross Country (6): fall (A-2, now 3A) 1994, 2000; (3A) 2001; (4A) 2008, 2022, 2023 (introduced in 1974)
- Soccer (1): fall (4A) 2015 (introduced in 2000)
- Volleyball (5): fall (A-2, now 3A) 1981, 1983, 1994, 1995; (3A) 2002 (introduced in 1976)
- Basketball (1): (A-2, now 3A) 1986 (introduced in 1976)
