= Civilization V =

2010 video game

- Developer: Firaxis Games
- Publishers: 2K (Windows); Aspyr (Mac OS X, Linux)
- Director: Jon Shafer
- Producers: Dennis Shirk; Lisa Miller
- Designers: Jon Shafer; Ed Beach; Scott Lewis
- Programmers: Brian Wade; Tim Kipp; Ed Beach
- Artists: Dorian Newcomb; Chris Hickman; Brian Busatti
- Writers: Michelle Menard; Paul Murphy
- Composers: Michael Curran; Geoff Knorr
- Series: Civilization
- Platforms: Windows, Mac OS X, Linux
- Release: Windows; NA: September 21, 2010; PAL: September 24, 2010; Mac OS X; WW: November 23, 2010; Linux; WW: June 10, 2014
- Genres: Turn-based strategy, 4X
- Modes: Single-player, multiplayer

Sid Meier's Civilization V is a 4X turn-based strategy video game developed by Firaxis Games and published by 2K. It is the sequel to Civilization IV, and was released for Windows in September 2010, for Mac OS X on November 23, 2010, and for Linux on June 10, 2014.

In Civilization V, the player leads a civilization from prehistoric times into the future on a procedurally generated map, attempting to achieve one of a number of different victory conditions through research, exploration, diplomacy, expansion, economic development, government and military conquest. The game is based on an entirely new game engine with hexagonal tiles instead of the square tiles of earlier games in the series. Many elements from Civilization IV and its expansion packs have been removed or changed, such as religion and espionage (although these were reintroduced in its subsequent expansions). The combat system has been overhauled, by removing stacking of military units and enabling cities to defend themselves by firing directly on nearby enemies. In addition, the maps contain computer-controlled city-states and non-player characters that are available for trade, diplomacy and conquest. A civilization's borders also expand one tile at a time, favoring more productive tiles, and roads now have a maintenance cost, making them much less common. The game features community, modding, and multiplayer elements. It is available for download on Steam.

Its first expansion pack, Civilization V: Gods & Kings, was released on June 19, 2012, in North America and June 22 internationally. It includes features such as religion, espionage, enhanced naval combat, and combat AI, as well as nine new civilizations.

A second expansion pack, Civilization V: Brave New World, was announced on March 15, 2013. It includes features such as international trade routes, a world congress, tourism, great works, nine new civilizations, eight additional wonders, and three ideologies. It was released on July 9, 2013, in North America and in the rest of the world three days later.

It was succeeded by a new entry in the series, Civilization VI, in 2016.

== Gameplay ==
A player starting location with one city and one warrior unit

Civilization V is a turn-based strategy game, where each player represents the leader of a certain nation or ethnic group ("civilization") and must guide its growth over the course of thousands of years. The game starts with the foundation of a small settlement and ends after achieving one of the victory conditions—or surviving until the number of game turns ends, at which point the highest-scoring civilization, based on several factors, such as population, land, technological advancement, and cultural development, is declared the winner.

During their turn, the player must manage units representing civilian and military forces. Civilian units can be directed to found new cities, improve land, and spread religion while military units can go into battle to take over other civilizations. The player controls production in their cities to produce new units and buildings, handles diplomacy with other civilizations in the game, and directs the civilization's growth in technology, culture, food supply, and economics. The player ends the game when a victory condition is met. Victory conditions include taking over the entire world by force, convincing the other civilizations to acknowledge the player as a leader through diplomacy, becoming influential with all civilizations through tourism, winning the space race to build a colony spaceship to reach a nearby planet, or being the most powerful civilization on the globe after a set number of turns.

The artificial intelligence (AI) in Civilization V is designed to operate a civilization on four levels: the tactical AI controls individual units; the operational AI oversees the entire war front; the strategic AI manages the entire empire; and the grand strategic AI sets long-term goals and determines how to win the game. The four levels of AI complement each other to allow for complex and fluid AI behaviors, which will differ from game to game. Each of the AI-controlled leaders has a unique personality, determined by a combination of 'flavors' on a ten-point scale; however, the values may differ slightly in each game. There are 26 flavors, grouped into categories including growth, expansion, wide strategy, military preferences, recon, naval recon, naval growth, and development preferences.

As in previous versions, cities remain the central pillar of Civilization gameplay. A city can be founded on a desired location by a settler unit, produced in the same way as military units. The city will then grow in population; produce units and buildings; and generate research, wealth and culture. The city will also expand its borders one or more tiles at a time, which is critical in claiming territory and resources. The expansion process is automated and directed towards the city's needs, but tiles can be bought with gold.

Siege warfare has been restructured from previous Civ games. Previous cities games relied entirely on garrisoned units for defense, whereas cities in Civ V now defend themselves and can attack invading units with a ranged attack expanding two tiles outward. Cities have hit points that, if taken down to zero, will signal the city's defeat to invading forces. Surviving an attack allows a city to recover a fraction (approximately 15%) of its hit points automatically each turn. In addition, any melee unit loses hit points upon attacking a city, dependent upon the unit and strength of the city which can be increased by garrisoning a unit or building defensive structures (e.g. walls).

Captured cities can be annexed, razed, or transformed into a puppet state, each option having distinct advantages and disadvantages. For example, puppet states will provide resources, give less unhappiness, and provide smaller increases to the cost of cultural policies, but have reduced science and culture yields. Also, puppet states are directly controlled by the A.I. instead of by the player.

In this iteration of the series, tactical gameplay in combat is encouraged in place of overwhelming numerical force with the introduction of new gameplay mechanisms. Most significantly, the square grid of the world map has been replaced with a hexagonal grid, a feature inspired by the 1994 game Panzer General according to lead designer Jon Shafer. In addition, each hexagonal tile can accommodate only one military unit and one civilian unit or great person at a time. This accommodation forces armies to spread out over large areas rather than be stacked onto a single tile, and moves most large battles outside the cities, increasing realism in sieges. City attacks are now most effective when surrounding the city tiles because of bonuses from flanking.

Units can now be more precisely moved with increased movement points, simpler transportation over water (embarkment instead of unit transport with water vessels), ranged attacks, and swapping of adjacent units. Ranged and melee units are now more balanced. Ranged units can attack melee units without retribution, but melee units will normally destroy ranged units.

In an effort to make individual units more valuable to the player (compared to previous games in the series), they take longer to produce and gain experience from defeating enemy units. At set levels, this experience can be redeemed for promotions, which provide various bonuses for increasing their effectiveness, or to substantially heal themselves. In a further departure from previous games, units are no longer always destroyed if defeated in combat. Instead, units can take partial damage, which can be healed at various rates depending on their type, location, and promotions earned. However, healthy units can still be completely destroyed in a single engagement if the opposing unit is much stronger.

Special "Great Person" units are still present in the game, providing special bonuses to the civilization that births them, with each Great Person named after a historic figure such as Albert Einstein or Leonardo da Vinci. Great people come in several varieties, and those available in the base game can be consumed to produce one of three effects: start a golden age, build a unique terrain improvement, or perform a unique special ability. For example, a Great General can create a 'Citadel' (a strong fort with the ability to inflict damage on nearby enemy units) or passively increase the combat strength of nearby friendly units. Capturing a Great Person destroys them, except for Great Prophets in the expansion sets. Many Great People are given bonuses linked to the special ability of the Civilization. For example, one of Mongolia's special abilities is to increase the movement rate of great generals from 2 to 5 and rename them into "Khans".

Civilizations can no longer trade technologies like in previous versions of the game; instead, civilizations can perform joint technological ventures. Two civilizations at peace can form a research agreement, which requires an initial investment of gold and provides both civilizations a certain amount of science so long as they remain at peace. Prior to the 1.0.1.332 PC version of the game, civilizations were provided with an unknown technology after a set number of turns of uninterrupted peaceful relations. It is possible for a civilization to sign a research agreement for the sole purpose of getting an enemy to spend money which could be used for other purposes; AI civilizations are programmed to sometimes use this tactic before declaring war. British actor W. Morgan Sheppard provides the narration for the opening cinematics to the original game and its expansion packs, the quotations at the discovery of new technologies and the building of landmarks, and the introduction of the player's chosen civilization at the start of each new game.

=== City-states ===
City-states, a feature new to the series, are minor civilizations that can be interacted with, but are incapable of achieving victory. Unlike major powers, city-states may expand in territory but they never establish new cities (they can conquer other cities with their military units). In addition to outright conquest, major civilizations have the option to befriend city-states, via bribery or services. City-states provide the player with bonuses such as resources and units, which increase as players advance to new eras. In the Brave New World expansion pack, city-states grant allied players additional delegates in the World Congress starting in the Industrial Era. There are three types of city-state in the base game, each with different personalities and bonuses: maritime, cultured, and militaristic. Two additional city-state types (mercantile and religious) were added in the Gods & Kings expansion pack to complement new gameplay mechanics. City-states play a prominent role in diplomacy among larger civilizations, as well as make specific requests and grant rewards.

=== Culture system ===
In a change to the culture system, Civilization V players have the ability to purchase social policies with earned culture. These social policies are organized into ten separate trees each containing five separate policies. Prior to the Brave New World expansion pack, the player was required to fill out five of the ten trees to win a cultural victory. Social policies replace the "Civics" government system of Civilization IV (where players had to switch out of old civics to adopt a new one) while social policies in Civilization V are cumulative bonuses.

According to Jon Shafer, "With the policies system, we wanted to keep the feel of mixing and matching to construct one's government that was part of Civ IV, but we also wanted to instill a sense of forward momentum. Rather than having to switch out of one policy to adopt another, the player builds upon the policies already unlocked. The thought process we want to promote is 'What cool new effect do I want?' rather than the feeling of needing to perform detailed analysis to determine if switching is a good idea."

=== Victory ===
As in previous games, there are multiple ways to achieve victory. The player may focus on scientific research and become the first to assemble and launch a spaceship, winning a Space Race victory. The player may focus on a diplomatic victory, which requires support from other civilizations and city-states in the United Nations. In the new culture system of Civilization V consisting of social policy "trees", the cultural victory prior to the Brave New World expansion pack involved filling out five of the ten "trees" and completing the Utopia project (reminiscent of the Ascent to Transcendence secret project in Sid Meier's Alpha Centauri).

World domination is an option, but the victory condition has been simplified compared to previous games in the series. Rather than completely destroying the other civilizations, the last player who controls their original capital wins by conquest. Since the Brave New World expansion pack, the player must control all original capitals (including their own) to win by Domination. The player can also win by having the highest score at the year 2050 AD, or all victory conditions can be disabled. This and other settings, for example, turning off city razing, can be modified in the "advanced setup" screen while setting up a game.

=== Civilizations ===
There are 18 playable civilizations available in the standard retail version of Civilization V. 7 DLC civilizations and a further 18 were added by the two expansions, leading to a total of 43 civilizations. The player chooses a civilization and assumes the role of its leader, based on prominent historical figures such as Napoleon Bonaparte. Each leader of a civilization has a combination of two unique units, improvements, or buildings. For example, Arabia has the camel archer which replaces the standard knight unit, and the bazaar which replaces the market. In addition to the two unique units, improvements, or buildings, there is a unique ability for each civilization. For example, Japan has Bushido, which causes their units to do maximum damage even when damaged themselves, and gives 1 culture from each Fishing Boat and 2 culture from each Atoll. The player is able to interact with the leaders of other civilizations via the diplomacy screen, accessed through clicking on a city of that civilization, or through the diplomacy button at the top of the screen. For the first time in the series, fully animated leaders are featured, who speak their native languages. For instance, Augustus Caesar speaks in his native Latin and Montezuma speaks in his native Nahuatl. According to Émile Khordoc, who voiced Augustus Caesar, the voices for the leaders were recorded in early 2009, approximately a year and a half before the release of the game.

The 18 base game civilizations were: America (led by George Washington), the Aztecs (led by Montezuma I), Egypt (led by Ramesses II), England (led by Elizabeth), Germany (led by Bismarck), Greece (led by Alexander), Songhai (led by Askia), the Iroquois (led by Hiawatha), the Ottomans (led by Suleiman), Rome (led by Augustus), France (led by Napoleon), China (led by Wu Zetian), Japan (led by Oda Nobunaga), Russia (led by Catherine), India (led by Gandhi), Persia (by Darius), Arabia (led by Harun al-Rashid), and Siam (led by Ramkhamhaeng). Genghis Khan of Mongolia was added as a preorder DLC, until October 25, 2010, when it was made free.

Six other DLCs were added: Nebuchadnezzar II of Babylon, Isabella of Spain, Pachacuti of the Incas, Kamehameha I of Polynesia, Harald Bluetooth of Denmark, and Sejong of Korea.

== Development ==
Firaxis began work on Civilization V sometime in 2007. Initially, the team working on the game consisted of seven artists led by Jon Shafer; this team gradually grew to 56 members. For initial tests of gameplay ideas, the team used the Civilization IV game engine (Gamebryo), while a new graphics engine was built from the ground up; this new engine, called LORE, came online only 18 months prior to the game's release. Teams working on different aspects of the game were located close to each other, which enabled the developers to solve some of the issues they were facing quickly.

According to producer Dennis Shirk, the move to one unit per tile had a great impact on the game's core systems. This forced the developers to create an entirely new AI system and caused the game's later eras to lose emphasis. The increased emphasis of the game's new features also meant that the developers had to trim some of the systems that existed in previous Civilization games. The developers also lost critical team members and lacked members working on the multiplayer aspects. After approximately 3 years and 3 months of development, the game was finally released in North America on September 21, 2010, and internationally on September 24.

=== LORE ===
LORE (Low Overhead Rendering Engine) is the name of the graphics engine used by Civilization V (and its successor Civilization: Beyond Earth). There was a presentation of LORE at the GDC2011. While Direct3D 11 was still in alpha stage, Firaxis decided to design the rendering engine natively for the Direct3D 11 architecture, and then map backwards to Direct3D 9. A major addition to the Direct3D 11 API was Tessellation and Civilization V contains one of the most complex terrain systems ever made. The rendering engine uses the GPU to ray-trace and anti-alias shadows.

The native ports to Mac OS X (November 23, 2010) and Linux (June 10, 2014) use an OpenGL rendering path.

=== Patches ===
As of November 21, 2012, the Windows and Mac OS X versions of Civilization V have had regular patches since being released, which included major gameplay alterations, numerous crash fixes, and other changes. Patch support for Mac OS X has often been delayed, with some patches being released more than a month after their Windows counterparts.

Using released source code the game's community continues the support for the game from where Firaxis left it with a community patch called Vox Populi.

== Release ==
2K Games released Civilization V and its demo on September 21, 2010, It is distributed through retail and the Steam content delivery system. The Mac OS X version was released on November 23, 2010, and the Linux/SteamOS version was released on June 10, 2014. In conjunction with its release, the State of Maryland, where Meier and Firaxis are based, named September 21, 2010, as "Sid Meier's Civilization V Day", in part due to Meier's success and for him "continuing a tradition of developing the talent and creativity of future generations".

A special edition of Civilization V was also set for worldwide release on the same day as the standard edition. The package consists of a 176-page artbook, a "behind-the-scenes" DVD at Firaxis, two-CD game soundtrack selections, and five metal figurines of in-game units, as well as the game itself.

A Game of the Year edition was released on September 27, 2011. It includes all four of the "Cradle of Civilization" map packs, as well as some of the new civilizations (Babylon, Spain, Inca, and Polynesia), their respective scenarios, and the official digital soundtrack. However, the "Explorer's Map Pack", "Civilization and Scenario Pack: Denmark - The Vikings", "Civilization and Scenario Pack - Korea" and "Wonders of the Ancient World Scenario Pack" are not included.

A Gold edition was released on February 12, 2013. It includes all "Cradle of Civilization" map packs, the "Explorer's Map Pack", the "Wonders of the Ancient World Scenario Pack", all the DLC civilizations and the Gods & Kings expansion pack.

A Complete edition was released on February 4, 2014. It includes both expansions and all the DLC packs.

== Additional content ==
Besides the 18 civilizations available in the standard retail version, additional civilizations are available as DLCs. Babylon under Nebuchadnezzar II was announced as a bonus civilization included in the Steam and Direct2Drive Digital Deluxe Editions, and later offered for all on October 25, 2010. Mongolia under Genghis Khan as well as a Mongolian themed scenario was added with a free update on October 25, 2010.

Spain, under Isabella, and the Inca Empire, under Pachacuti, as well as a similarly themed scenario were offered as the first "Double Civilization and Scenario Pack" on December 16, 2010. The "Civilization and Scenario Pack: Polynesia" was released on March 3, 2011, and adds the Polynesian Empire under Kamehameha I. The "Civilization and Scenario Pack: Denmark" was released on May 3, 2011, and features the Danish civilization under Harald Bluetooth, similar to the Viking civilization from previous games. On August 11, 2011, the "Civilization and Scenario Pack: Korea" was released featuring the Korean civilization under Sejong the Great.

On August 11, 2011, a "Wonders of the Ancient World Scenario Pack" was released adding three new ancient wonders – The Temple of Artemis, The Statue of Zeus, and The Mausoleum of Halicarnassus – as well as a scenario based around the Seven Wonders of the Ancient World. This was the first time that new wonders were added as DLC.

Additionally, several downloadable map packs were offered as a pre-order bonus from various retailers: Steam, "Cradle of Civilization: Mesopotamia"; Amazon.com, "Cradle of Civilization: Asia"; Gamestop and Play.com, "Cradle of Civilization: The Mediterranean"; and "Cradle of Civilization: The Americas." All four maps were later made available for purchase through Steam. Coinciding with the release of the "Civilization and Scenario Pack: Denmark" on May 3, 2011, an "Explorers Map Pack" was released featuring map types inspired by real-world locations like the Amazon and Bering Strait. In late 2012 the developers released the source code of the core game part to support the modding community. Mods may be downloaded via the Steam Workshop for either version. As of July 2013, the Mac OS X version (not to be confused with the Steam version) does not officially support mods, although working around and moving files from and to certain folders will enable them.

An independently developed software known as Giant Multiplayer Robot makes use of the hotseat multiplayer mode in Civilization V to mimic the play-by-email functionality that was present in previous Civilization series titles.

== Expansion packs ==
=== Gods & Kings ===
On February 16, 2012, an expansion pack titled Gods & Kings was announced. It was released on June 19, 2012, in North America, and June 22 in the rest of the world. The expansion added new features to the base game such as religion, espionage, three new scenarios, an expanded technology tree, several new units, new religious and mercantile city states, nine new wonders and nine new playable civilizations: Austria (led by Maria Theresa), Byzantium (led by Theodora), Carthage (led by Dido), the Celts (led by Boudica), Ethiopia (led by Haile Selassie), the Huns (led by Attila), the Maya (led by Pacal), the Netherlands (led by William), and Sweden (led by Gustavus Adolphus). Additionally, Spain (led by Isabella), previously available only as DLC in Civilization V, is included with the expansion.

=== Brave New World ===
On March 15, 2013, an expansion pack titled Brave New World was announced and released in North America on July 9, 2013, and internationally on July 12. The expansion added new features to the base game such as international trade routes, World Congress, tourism, Great Works, two new scenarios, eight new wonders, several new units and nine new civilizations: Assyria (led by Ashurbanipal), Brazil (led by Pedro II), Indonesia (led by Gajah Mada), Morocco (led by Ahmad al-Mansur), Poland (led by Casimir), Portugal (led by Maria I), the Shoshone (led by Pocatello), Venice (led by Enrico Dandolo), and the Zulus (led by Shaka). Additionally, Ethiopia, previously available in the first expansion pack, is included with the expansion.

== Reception ==
Reception

Aggregate scores
Aggregator	Score
GameRankings	89.17% (49 reviews)
Metacritic	90/100 (70 reviews)

Review scores
Publication	Score
1Up.com	C
Eurogamer	8/10
G4	5/5
Game Informer	9.75/10
GameSpot	9.0/10
GameTrailers	9.4/10
IGN	9.0/10
PC Gamer (US)	93/100
MMGN	9.5/10

Civilization V received critical acclaim, achieving a Metacritic score of 90/100 after 70 reviews and 89.17% after 49 reviews in GameRankings.

G4TV gave it 5 out of 5, describing it as a "fantastic turn-based strategy game... In many ways... the best representation of the series and certainly the most accessible for new and old players alike", adding that the "diplomatic model is anemic" and describing the AI as "fairly average." IGN gave the game an "Outstanding 9.0", saying "This is the first Civilization for PC that is worth just about every person's time," but also criticizing the AI for being too aggressive and noting that players who played Civilization IV may miss the civics and religion features. GameSpot praised the game's addictiveness, claiming it to be "yet another glistening example of turn-based bliss that will keep you up long past your bedtime".

Some reviews were less positive, with the most common criticisms being directed at the game's artificial intelligence. 1UP.com says that the game features an "A.I. that can't play the game," and noted that the game has "some nice innovations that will make it hard to go back to Civilization IV. But in other ways, it's a disappointment that needs a lot more work." Eurogamer gave the game an 8/10 despite their criticism that "the AI in Civ V is still curiously terrible," while GameShark gave the game a B+ while stating that "the computer opponents are ill equipped for the military side of things."

During the 14th Annual Interactive Achievement Awards, the Academy of Interactive Arts & Sciences nominated Civilization V for "Strategy/Simulation Game of the Year".

=== Legacy ===
Nearly ten years later, Rock, Paper, Shotgun cited Civilization V as one of their top 50 PC games of the decade, noting its impact on future games in the 4X game genre, particularly for "hexifying the formerly square-based world of Civ, and complicating war by allowing only one fightsperson per map tile". Despite the release of Civilization VI a few years later, they made the case that the fifth edition "arguably set the high water mark for the series". Kotaku rated it the best game in the series, explaining that "ten years on from its release, and with a whole new game having followed suit, Civilization V remains the pinnacle of the Civilization experience, the most ideal balance between its competing systems and ideas".

Lead designer Jon Shafer did reflect back on the project, and acknowledged criticisms of the game's AI, noting that the player's opponents "were completely enslaved to their gameplay situation, and as a result they appeared random", and that the AI "floated from one 'strategy' to another without any real cohesion behind [its] decisions."
