= Civilization V: Gods & Kings =

- Developer: Firaxis Games
- Publishers: 2K Games (Windows); Aspyr (OS X, Linux)
- Designer: Ed Beach
- Series: Civilization
- Platforms: Microsoft Windows, Mac OS X, Linux, Cloud (OnLive)
- Release: NA: June 19, 2012; WW: June 22, 2012
- Genres: Turn-based strategy, 4X
- Modes: Single-player, multiplayer

Sid Meier's Civilization V: Gods & Kings is the first official expansion pack for the turn-based strategy video game Civilization V. It was released on June 19, 2012 in North America, and on June 22, 2012 in the rest of the world. It adds both religion and espionage mechanics to the game as well as reworking the combat and diplomacy features. It is available either in disc form or as download content via Steam.

== Gameplay ==
Gods & Kings includes 27 new units, 13 new buildings, nine new wonders, two new eras, and nine new playable civilizations. A new religion mechanic featuring a "faith" resource allows players to found their own religion which they can grow into a "world-spanning fully customized religion." Diplomacy has been reworked to include espionage, foreign embassies, and new types of city-states (religious and mercantile). City-states also feature a new quest system and strategic importance. Additionally, the combat system has been re-worked to include smarter AI, an expanded early modern era, and enhanced naval combat featuring Great Admiral and melee naval units. Gods & Kings adds an additional 52 Steam achievements to Civilization V.

Three new scenarios are included in the expansion: "Fall of Rome", focusing on the decline of the Roman Empire; "Into the Renaissance", focusing on religion in the Middle Ages into the Renaissance era; and "Empires of the Smoky Skies", a Victorian steampunk scenario.

Gods & Kings reintroduces a religion mechanic to the series. Players are able to found a religion and customize its various beliefs, resulting in differing in-game benefits, through the cultivation of a "faith" resource similar to how culture and science already function in the game. The use of Great Prophet, missionary, and inquisitor units also allows players to spread and control their chosen religion. Religion will feature prominently in the first two-thirds of the game, affecting diplomacy and international relations, but its effect will taper off as players approach the modern era. Gods & Kings includes eleven religions: Buddhism, Christianity, Confucianism, Hinduism, Islam, Judaism, Shinto, Sikhism, Taoism, Tengrism and Zoroastrianism. However, the player has the option to rename a religion as they wish.

Espionage in Gods & Kings can be used to invade rival civilizations as well as city-states. Spies are capable of stealing technology, rigging elections, performing reconnaissance, as well as various other espionage missions available in previous Civilization games. Unlike in previous games, however, spies are not trained by a civilization. Instead, they are awarded at certain intervals along the timeline. Additionally, unlike in past games, spies can gain levels by successfully performing a mission, just as combat units gain experience whenever they engage in a battle and succeed. Captured spies can also reveal information to the opposing civilization. The espionage system is designed to take effect just as the religion system begins to taper off. As such, spies are not available until the Renaissance era.

The expansion includes nine new playable civilizations and leaders: William I of the Netherlands, Boudicca of the Celts, Pacal the Great of the Maya, Dido of Carthage, Theodora of Byzantium, Attila of the Huns, Maria Theresa of Austria, Haile Selassie of Ethiopia, and Gustavus Adolphus of Sweden. Additionally, Isabella of Spain, previously released as DLC for Civilization V, is included with the expansion along with the nine new playable civilizations.

== Reception ==
Reception

Aggregate score
Aggregator	Score
Metacritic	80/100 (53 reviews)

Review scores
Publication	Score
G4	4/5
Giant Bomb	4/5
IGN	9.0/10

Early reviews on the game were positive, with a score of 80 out of 100 on review aggregator Metacritic, based on 53 reviews.

IGN stated that the expansion "enhances the base game immensely, so much so that I can't imagine playing Civilization V without it", and concludes that "longtime Civ fans and newcomers alike have plenty of reason to go forth and find faith in Gods and Kings", giving it a score of 9 out of 10. Forbes called it "a terrific expansion - and as addictive as ever", praising the reintroduction of both religion and espionage to the series. The Escapist said that "more than just additional civs, units and technologies, Gods & Kings brings whole new systems to Civ V's turn-based design which force you to rethink old strategies", awarding the game with a four and a half stars out of five. The Verge praised especially the new religion mechanics, stating its superiority to the previous Civilization IV: "it's not the half-assed pick from a list and watch the game do stuff that doesn't matter religion system in Civilization IV. (...) It adds a new layer to world interactions and provides just one more way to conquer the world."

A less enthusiastic opinion came from GameSpy, which criticized espionage for its reduced importance in the overall gameplay and stated that the expansion bears little difference from its core game, giving it a three and a half stars out of five.
