= Franklin County, Idaho =

County in Idaho, United States

- County
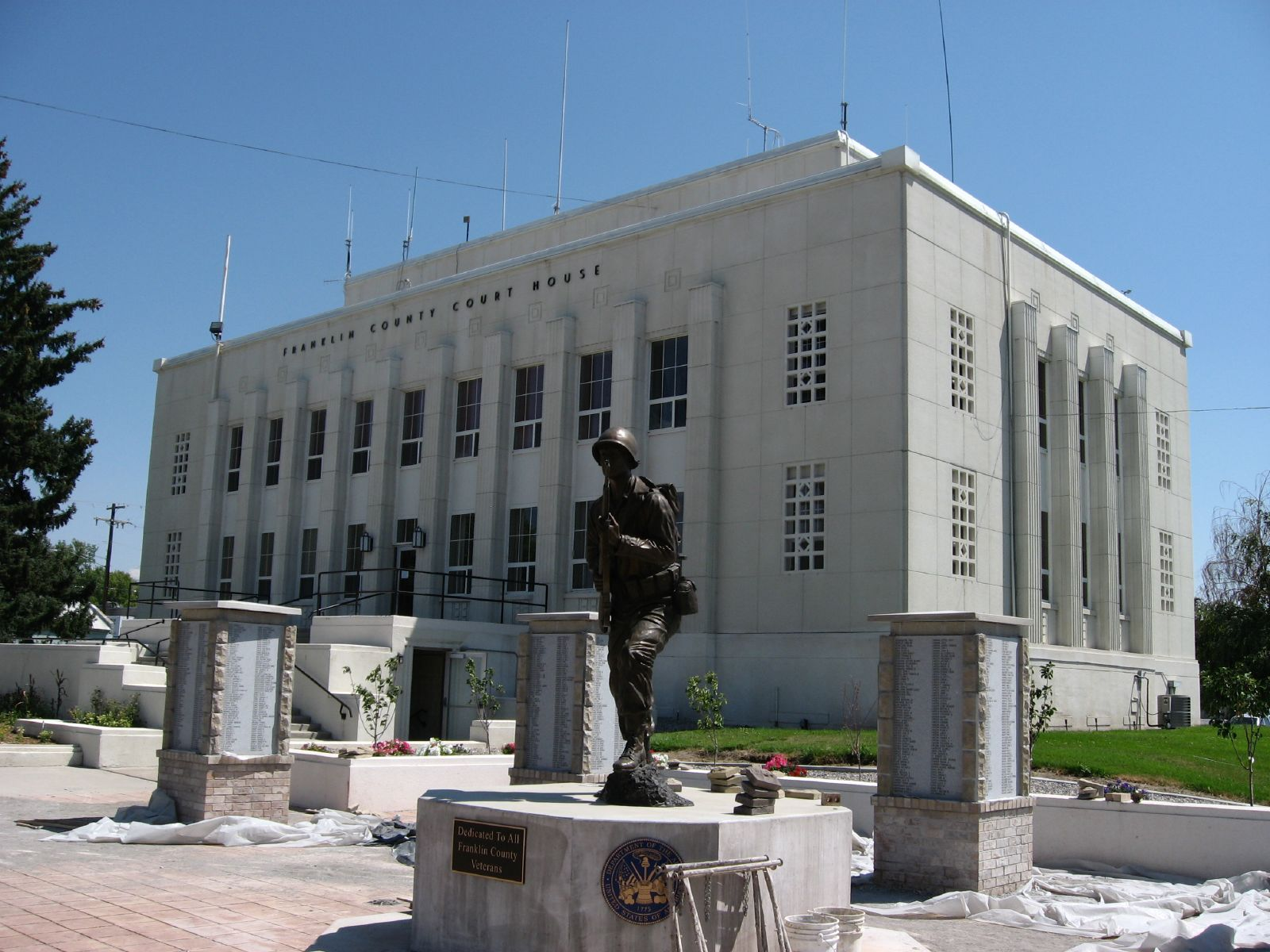
- Franklin County Courthouse, Preston

- Seal

- Location within the U.S. state of Idaho
- Coordinates: 42°11′N 111°49′W
- Country: United States
- State: Idaho
- Founded: January 20, 1913
- Named for: Franklin D. Richards
- Seat: Preston
- Largest city: Preston

Area
  - Total: 668 sq mi (1,730 km^{2})
  - Land: 664 sq mi (1,720 km^{2})
  - Water: 4.7 sq mi (12 km^{2}) 0.7%

Population (2020)
  - Total: 14,194
  - Estimate (2025): 15,889 ▲
  - Density: 21.4/sq mi (8.25/km^{2})
- Time zone: UTC−7 (Mountain)
  - Summer (DST): UTC−6 (MDT)
- Congressional district: 2nd
- Website: franklincountyidaho.org

Franklin County is a county located in the U.S. state of Idaho. As of the 2020 Census the county had a population of 14,194. The county seat and largest city is Preston. The county was established in 1913 and named after Franklin D. Richards, an Apostle of the Church of Jesus Christ of Latter-day Saints. It is one of two Franklin Counties in the United States that is not named after Benjamin Franklin, along with Franklin County, Texas. Franklin County is part of the Logan, UT-ID Metropolitan Statistical Area.

== History ==
Idaho's oldest permanent non-native settlement occurred at Franklin on April 14, 1860, when members of The Church of Jesus Christ of Latter-day Saints led by Thomas S. Smart established the settlement at its present location on the Cub River. It was the seventh and northernmost settlement in the Cache Valley at the time of its settlement and was believed to be in Utah until the Idaho boundary with Utah was finalized in 1872. All of the county's incorporated cities were settled by 1868 with Oxford settled in 1864, Weston in 1865, Dayton in 1868, Clifton in 1869, and Preston by 1868. The Bear River Massacre took place in present-day Franklin County on January 29, 1863.

While the settlers at Franklin were effectively governed by Utah Territory until 1872, the settlers were actually located within Washington Territory from 1860 to 1863 and not within the boundary of any county until Shoshone was created in 1861. They became part of Idaho County in 1861, and Boise in 1863. And finally, under Idaho Territory, they briefly became part of Owyhee County before being transferred to Oneida County in 1864. At the 1870 census, the three Franklin County precincts were enumerated in Cache County, Utah, containing 1,053 residents. In 1885, the northern portion of the county was transferred to Bingham County at its creation. At the 1890 Census, Bingham and Oneida Counties returned five precincts of Dayton, Franklin, Oxford, Preston, and Treasureton with 4,969 residents. The Oxford and Treasureton precincts were transferred to Bannock County at its establishment in 1893. Bannock County retained the Oxford precinct and renamed the Treasureton Precinct as Cleveland. By 1900, Oneida contained seven precincts that would later be entirely within Franklin County. Together, the nine precincts comprised a population of 6,566 at that time. The Cleveland and Treasureton areas were transferred to Franklin County in 1918. The portion of the Thatcher area in Franklin County remained within Bannock County until 1946.

In 1953, an aircraft carrying 37 Korean War veterans crashed in the mountains of eastern Franklin County, killing all aboard. This is the most deadly aviation accident in Idaho. A memorial was dedicated in 1967. It is locally known as the Pat Hollow crash site.

== Geography ==
According to the U.S. Census Bureau, the county has a total area of 668 square miles (1,730 km^{2}), of which 664 square miles (1,720 km^{2}) is land and 4.7 square miles (12 km^{2}) (0.7%) is water.

=== Adjacent counties ===
- Oneida County – west
- Bannock County – northwest
- Caribou County – north
- Bear Lake County – east
- Cache County, Utah – south

=== Major highways ===
- US 91
- SH-34
- SH-36

=== National protected area ===
- Cache National Forest (part)
- Caribou National Forest (part)

== Demographics ==
Historical population
Census	Pop.	Note	%±
1920	8,650		—
1930	9,379		8.4%
1940	10,229		9.1%
1950	9,867		−3.5%
1960	8,467		−14.2%
1970	7,373		−12.9%
1980	8,895		20.6%
1990	9,232		3.8%
2000	11,329		22.7%
2010	12,786		12.9%
2020	14,194		11.0%
2025 (est.)	15,889	▲	11.9%
U.S. Decennial Census; 1790–1960 1900–1990; 1990–2000 2010–2020 2020

=== Racial and ethnic composition ===
Franklin County, Idaho – Racial and ethnic composition Note: the US Census treats Hispanic/Latino as an ethnic category. This table excludes Latinos from the racial categories and assigns them to a separate category. Hispanics/Latinos may be of any race.
Race / Ethnicity (NH = Non-Hispanic)	Pop 1980	Pop 1990	Pop 2000	Pop 2010	Pop 2020	% 1980	% 1990	% 2000	% 2010	% 2020
White alone (NH)	8,716	8,947	10,619	11,743	12,701	97.99%	96.91%	93.73%	91.84%	89.48%
Black or African American alone (NH)	0	5	10	28	22	0.00%	0.05%	0.09%	0.22%	0.15%
Native American or Alaska Native alone (NH)	23	32	27	33	75	0.26%	0.35%	0.24%	0.26%	0.53%
Asian alone (NH)	10	10	16	15	28	0.11%	0.11%	0.14%	0.12%	0.20%
Native Hawaiian or Pacific Islander alone (NH)	x	x	5	7	7	x	x	0.04%	0.05%	0.05%
Other race alone (NH)	6	1	1	1	20	0.07%	0.01%	0.01%	0.01%	0.14%
Mixed race or Multiracial (NH)	x	x	60	121	318	x	x	0.53%	0.95%	2.24%
Hispanic or Latino (any race)	140	237	591	838	1,023	1.57%	2.57%	5.22%	6.55%	7.21%
Total	8,895	9,232	11,329	12,786	14,194	100.00%	100.00%	100.00%	100.00%	100.00%

=== 2020 census ===
As of the 2020 census, the county had a population of 14,194. The median age was 33.9 years. 31.8% of residents were under the age of 18 and 15.2% of residents were 65 years of age or older. For every 100 females there were 102.1 males, and for every 100 females age 18 and over there were 99.1 males.

The racial makeup of the county was 90.9% White, 0.2% Black or African American, 0.7% American Indian and Alaska Native, 0.2% Asian, 0.0% Native Hawaiian and Pacific Islander, 3.2% from some other race, and 4.7% from two or more races. Hispanic or Latino residents of any race comprised 7.2% of the population.

0.0% of residents lived in urban areas, while 100.0% lived in rural areas.

There were 4,601 households in the county, of which 41.0% had children under the age of 18 living with them and 15.3% had a female householder with no spouse or partner present. About 15.9% of all households were made up of individuals and 8.0% had someone living alone who was 65 years of age or older.

There were 4,985 housing units, of which 7.7% were vacant. Among occupied housing units, 81.9% were owner-occupied and 18.1% were renter-occupied. The homeowner vacancy rate was 1.2% and the rental vacancy rate was 2.6%.

=== 2010 census ===
As of the 2010 United States census, there were 12,786 people, 4,079 households, and 3,259 families living in the county. The population density was 19.3 inhabitants per square mile (7.5/km^{2}). There were 4,528 housing units at an average density of 6.8 units per square mile (2.6 units/km^{2}). The racial makeup of the county was 94.4% White, 0.4% American Indian, 0.2% black or African American, 0.1% Pacific islander, 0.1% Asian, 3.3% from other races, and 1.6% from two or more races. Those of Hispanic or Latino origin made up 6.6% of the population. In terms of ancestry, 34.6% were English, 11.5% were German, 11.0% were Danish, 8.0% were American, and 7.2% were Swedish.

Of the 4,079 households, 44.1% had children under the age of 18 living with them, 70.6% were married couples living together, 6.3% had a female householder with no husband present, 20.1% were non-families, and 17.9% of all households were made up of individuals. The average household size was 3.11 and the average family size was 3.56. The median age was 31.5 years.

The median income for a household in the county was $45,682 and the median income for a family was $50,586. Males had a median income of $41,208 versus $25,717 for females. The per capita income for the county was $17,967. About 9.4% of families and 13.7% of the population were below the poverty line, including 20.4% of those under age 18 and 6.7% of those age 65 or over.

=== 2000 census ===
As of the census of 2000, there were 11,329 people, 3,476 households, and 2,874 families living in the county. The population density was 17 people per square mile (6.6 people/km^{2}). There were 3,872 housing units at an average density of 6 units per square mile (2.3 units/km^{2}). The racial makeup of the county was 95.11% White, 0.11% Black or African American, 0.29% Native American, 0.14% Asian, 0.04% Pacific Islander, 3.42% from other races, and 0.89% from two or more races. 5.22% of the population were Hispanic or Latino of any race. 34.6% were of English, 15.2% American, 9.1% Danish, and 8.8% German ancestry.

There were 3,476 households, out of which 48.00% had children under the age of 18 living with them, 73.60% were married couples living together, 5.80% had a female householder with no husband present, and 17.30% were non-families. 16.00% of all households were made up of individuals, and 8.90% had someone living alone who was 65 years of age or older. The average household size was 3.24 and the average family size was 3.64.

In the county, 37.30% of residents were under the age of 18, 9.30% were from 18 to 24, 24.20% from 25 to 44, 17.50% from 45 to 64, and 11.70% were 65 years of age or older. The median age was 28 years. For every 100 females, there were 99.40 males. For every 100 females age 18 and over, there were 98.30 males.

The median income for a household in the county was $36,061, and the median income for a family was $40,185. Males had a median income of $30,071 versus $21,077 for females. The per capita income for the county was $13,702. About 5.40% of families and 7.40% of the population were below the poverty line, including 8.00% of those under age 18 and 5.30% of those age 65 or over.

== Communities ==
=== Cities ===
- Clifton
- Dayton
- Franklin
- Preston (county seat)
- Weston

=== Unincorporated communities ===
- Fairview
- Linrose
- Mink Creek
- Oxford
- Riverdale
- Thatcher
- Whitney

== Politics ==
Franklin County is overwhelmingly Republican. The last Democrat to carry the county was Franklin D. Roosevelt in 1944. In fact, the last Democrat to win 21 percent of the county's ballots was Jimmy Carter in 1976, and Bill Clinton in 1996 was the last Democrat to gain so much as one-eighth of the county's vote. In 2016 and 1992 third-party candidates easily outpolled the Democratic candidate, and in the latter case Bo Gritz was only 23 votes shy of forcing Bill Clinton into fourth place.

United States presidential election results for Franklin County, Idaho
Year	Republican		Democratic		Third party(ies)	
Year	No.	%	No.	%	No.	%
1916	1,089	42.77%	1,425	55.97%	32	1.26%
1920	1,612	64.20%	899	35.80%	0	0.00%
1924	1,361	51.87%	540	20.58%	723	27.55%
1928	1,718	58.71%	1,193	40.77%	15	0.51%
1932	1,764	48.45%	1,871	51.39%	6	0.16%
1936	1,396	38.04%	2,255	61.44%	19	0.52%
1940	2,069	48.95%	2,158	51.05%	0	0.00%
1944	1,950	49.68%	1,971	50.22%	4	0.10%
1948	2,028	53.19%	1,763	46.24%	22	0.58%
1952	3,252	73.31%	1,181	26.62%	3	0.07%
1956	2,795	70.30%	1,181	29.70%	0	0.00%
1960	2,633	66.07%	1,352	33.93%	0	0.00%
1964	2,400	60.26%	1,583	39.74%	0	0.00%
1968	2,509	66.11%	831	21.90%	455	11.99%
1972	2,787	71.59%	611	15.69%	495	12.72%
1976	2,720	67.80%	1,157	28.84%	135	3.36%
1980	3,669	85.31%	511	11.88%	121	2.81%
1984	3,261	87.15%	439	11.73%	42	1.12%
1988	2,992	77.29%	806	20.82%	73	1.89%
1992	2,115	52.22%	524	12.94%	1,411	34.84%
1996	2,435	62.56%	807	20.73%	650	16.70%
2000	3,594	84.70%	513	12.09%	136	3.21%
2004	4,527	89.57%	456	9.02%	71	1.40%
2008	4,246	83.68%	600	11.82%	228	4.49%
2012	5,195	92.77%	325	5.80%	80	1.43%
2016	3,901	70.94%	385	7.00%	1,213	22.06%
2020	5,845	87.71%	657	9.86%	162	2.43%
2024	6,279	87.40%	703	9.79%	202	2.81%

== See also ==
- Bear River Massacre Site
- National Register of Historic Places listings in Franklin County, Idaho
