= Weston, Idaho =

- City
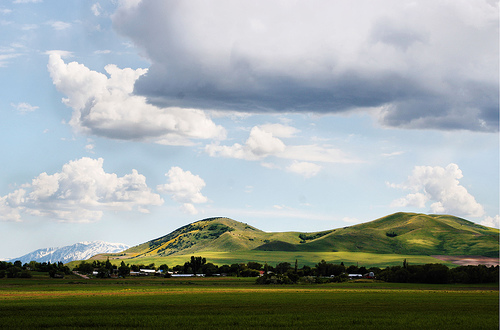

- Location of Weston in Franklin County, Idaho.
- Coordinates: 42°02′13″N 111°58′42″W
- Country: United States
- State: Idaho
- County: Franklin

Area
  - Total: 1.90 sq mi (4.93 km^{2})
  - Land: 1.90 sq mi (4.92 km^{2})
  - Water: 0.0039 sq mi (0.01 km^{2})
- Elevation: 4,741 ft (1,445 m)

Population (2020)
  - Total: 511
  - Density: 247/sq mi (95.5/km^{2})
- Time zone: UTC-7 (Mountain (MST))
  - Summer (DST): UTC-6 (MDT)
- ZIP code: 83286
- Area code: 208
- FIPS code: 16-87040
- GNIS feature ID: 2412240
- Website: www.westonidaho.org

Weston is a city in Franklin County, Idaho, United States. The population was 511 at the 2020 census. It is part of the Logan, Utah-Idaho Metropolitan Statistical Area. It was first settled in 1865. The community was so named due to its location at the west bank of the Bear River.

== Geography ==
According to the United States Census Bureau, the city has a total area of 1.98 square miles (5.13 km^{2}), of which, 1.97 square miles (5.10 km^{2}) is land and 0.01 square miles (0.03 km^{2}) is water.

== Demographics ==
Historical population
Census	Pop.	Note	%±
1910	308		—
1920	452		46.8%
1930	429		−5.1%
1940	439		2.3%
1950	382		−13.0%
1960	284		−25.7%
1970	230		−19.0%
1980	310		34.8%
1990	390		25.8%
2000	425		9.0%
2010	437		2.8%
2020	511		16.9%
U.S. Decennial Census

=== 2010 census ===
As of the census of 2010, there were 437 people, 139 households, and 112 families residing in the city. The population density was 221.8 inhabitants per square mile (85.6/km^{2}). There were 147 housing units at an average density of 74.6 per square mile (28.8/km^{2}). The racial makeup of the city was 98.4% White, 0.5% African American, and 1.1% from two or more races. Hispanic or Latino of any race were 0.5% of the population.

There were 139 households, of which 45.3% had children under the age of 18 living with them, 74.1% were married couples living together, 4.3% had a female householder with no husband present, 2.2% had a male householder with no wife present, and 19.4% were non-families. 18.7% of all households were made up of individuals, and 7.2% had someone living alone who was 65 years of age or older. The average household size was 3.14 and the average family size was 3.63.

The median age in the city was 29 years. 37.1% of residents were under the age of 18; 6.6% were between the ages of 18 and 24; 22.2% were from 25 to 44; 24.9% were from 45 to 64; and 9.2% were 65 years of age or older. The gender makeup of the city was 49.9% male and 50.1% female.

=== 2000 census ===
As of the census of 2000, there were 425 people, 118 households, and 105 families residing in the city. The population density was 214.6 inhabitants per square mile (82.9/km^{2}). There were 129 housing units at an average density of 65.1 per square mile (25.1/km^{2}). The racial makeup of the city was 97.18% White, 0.24% Pacific Islander, 1.88% from other races, and 0.71% from two or more races. Hispanic or Latino of any race were 3.29% of the population.

There were 118 households, out of which 56.8% had children under the age of 18 living with them, 81.4% were married couples living together, 5.1% had a female householder with no husband present, and 11.0% were non-families. 11.0% of all households were made up of individuals, and 4.2% had someone living alone who was 65 years of age or older. The average household size was 3.60 and the average family size was 3.84.

In the city, the population was spread out, with 39.5% under the age of 18, 9.9% from 18 to 24, 24.9% from 25 to 44, 17.9% from 45 to 64, and 7.8% who were 65 years of age or older. The median age was 25 years. For every 100 females, there were 103.3 males. For every 100 females aged 18 and over, there were 107.3 males.

The median income for a household in the city was $35,556, and the median income for a family was $35,750. Males had a median income of $31,458 versus $17,188 for females. The per capita income for the city was $10,206. About 8.6% of families and 11.0% of the population were below the poverty line, including 11.8% of those under age 18 and 12.9% of those age 65 or over.

== Notable people ==
- Glenn Beck, American conservative political commentator and radio host
- Parley Parker Christensen, Los Angeles City Council member
- Ray D. Free, U.S. Army Reserve general and member of the Utah House of Representatives
- Harold B. Lee (1899-1973), educator, religious leader
