= Preston, Idaho =

- City
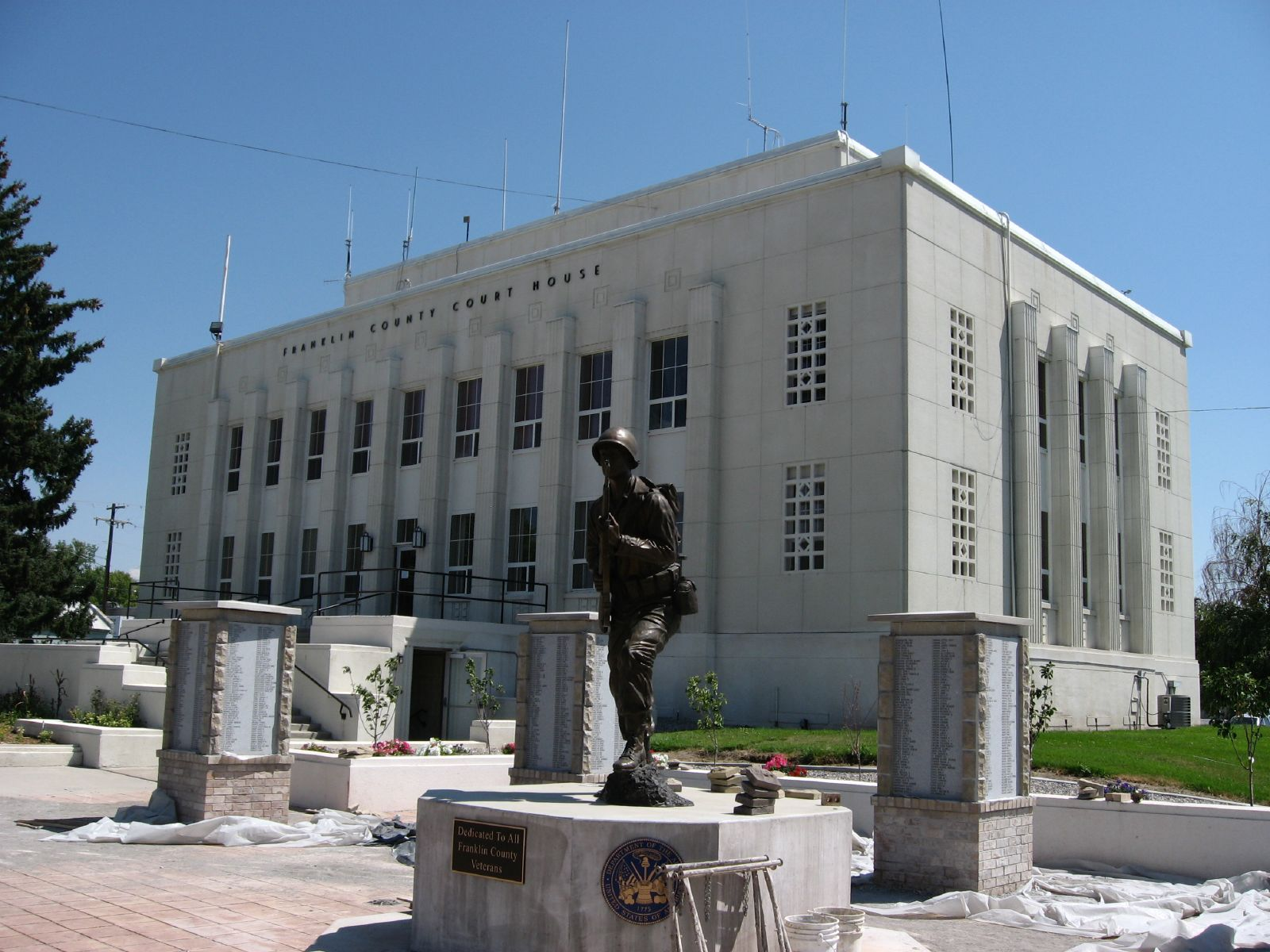
- Franklin County Courthouse, Preston, Idaho

- Location of Preston in Franklin County, Idaho

- Location in the United States
- Coordinates: 42°06′43″N 111°52′42″W
- Country: United States
- State: Idaho
- County: Franklin

Area
  - Total: 6.80 sq mi (17.61 km^{2})
  - Land: 6.80 sq mi (17.60 km^{2})
  - Water: 0.0039 sq mi (0.01 km^{2})
- Elevation: 4,715 ft (1,437 m)

Population (2020)
  - Total: 5,591
  - Estimate (2022): 5,994
  - Density: 822.8/sq mi (317.7/km^{2})
- Time zone: UTC-7 (Mountain (MST))
  - Summer (DST): UTC-6 (MDT)
- ZIP code: 83263
- Area code: 208
- FIPS code: 16-65260
- GNIS feature ID: 2411490
- Website: prestonidaho.net

Preston is a city in Franklin County, Idaho, United States. The population was 5,591 at the 2020 census, up from 5,204 at the 2010 census. The city is the county seat of Franklin County. It is part of the Logan metropolitan area.

== History ==
The Bear River Massacre occurred in 1863 at a point a few miles northwest of Preston. The Bear River Massacre Site is a National Historic Landmark.

In 1866, Latter-day Saint pioneers arrived in the northern end of the Cache Valley, stretching across southeastern Idaho and northeastern Utah. They founded a community in that location and named it Worm Creek, but in 1881 changed it to Preston because leaders of the Church of Jesus Christ of Latter-day Saints (LDS Church) in Salt Lake City objected to the name "Worm Creek" being part of any church congregation's name. The name Preston was suggested by a local member to honor William B. Preston, who at the time was president of the LDS Church's Cache Stake.

It was not until the 1880s while William C. Parkinson was serving as the bishop of the Preston LDS Ward that a regular townsite was laid out.

== Geography ==
According to the United States Census Bureau, the city has a total area of 6.66 square miles (17.25 km^{2}), of which, 6.65 square miles (17.22 km^{2}) is land and 0.01 square miles (0.03 km^{2}) is water.

Nearby is the Cub River Canyon, which is a popular recreation area.

Within Preston itself, U.S. Highway 91 is the main north–south street, State Street. By driving south on US-91, it is a 25-minute drive from Preston to the larger Logan, Utah. Oneida Street, also State Highway 36 is the primary west–east road. Preston is a half-hour drive from Interstate 15.

=== Climate ===
Preston has a warm-summer humid continental climate (Köppen climate classification: Dfb).

Climate data for Preston, Idaho, 1991–2020 normals, extremes 1964–present
Month	Jan	Feb	Mar	Apr	May	Jun	Jul	Aug	Sep	Oct	Nov	Dec	Year
Record high °F (°C)	58 (14)	63 (17)	76 (24)	85 (29)	94 (34)	100 (38)	110 (43)	100 (38)	98 (37)	87 (31)	70 (21)	65 (18)	110 (43)
Mean maximum °F (°C)	45.5 (7.5)	51.7 (10.9)	66.9 (19.4)	76.5 (24.7)	84.7 (29.3)	92.5 (33.6)	97.5 (36.4)	95.8 (35.4)	89.4 (31.9)	79.2 (26.2)	61.3 (16.3)	49.0 (9.4)	98.1 (36.7)
Mean daily maximum °F (°C)	32.3 (0.2)	37.7 (3.2)	50.3 (10.2)	59.1 (15.1)	69.1 (20.6)	79.4 (26.3)	89.2 (31.8)	87.4 (30.8)	76.9 (24.9)	62.6 (17.0)	46.5 (8.1)	33.5 (0.8)	60.3 (15.8)
Daily mean °F (°C)	23.8 (−4.6)	28.0 (−2.2)	38.8 (3.8)	46.0 (7.8)	54.8 (12.7)	63.1 (17.3)	71.4 (21.9)	69.9 (21.1)	59.9 (15.5)	48.0 (8.9)	35.3 (1.8)	25.0 (−3.9)	47.0 (8.3)
Mean daily minimum °F (°C)	15.3 (−9.3)	18.3 (−7.6)	27.2 (−2.7)	32.9 (0.5)	40.4 (4.7)	46.8 (8.2)	53.5 (11.9)	52.4 (11.3)	43.0 (6.1)	33.4 (0.8)	24.1 (−4.4)	16.5 (−8.6)	33.7 (0.9)
Mean minimum °F (°C)	−3.3 (−19.6)	0.4 (−17.6)	11.5 (−11.4)	21.4 (−5.9)	27.7 (−2.4)	35.5 (1.9)	44.5 (6.9)	41.4 (5.2)	31.1 (−0.5)	20.1 (−6.6)	7.4 (−13.7)	−1.7 (−18.7)	−7.1 (−21.7)
Record low °F (°C)	−25 (−32)	−31 (−35)	−12 (−24)	11 (−12)	21 (−6)	22 (−6)	32 (0)	30 (−1)	13 (−11)	4 (−16)	−8 (−22)	−31 (−35)	−31 (−35)
Average precipitation inches (mm)	1.66 (42)	1.40 (36)	1.50 (38)	1.89 (48)	2.24 (57)	1.24 (31)	0.74 (19)	0.81 (21)	1.48 (38)	1.59 (40)	1.18 (30)	1.57 (40)	17.30 (439)
Average snowfall inches (cm)	13.5 (34)	10.8 (27)	5.1 (13)	3.0 (7.6)	0.2 (0.51)	0.0 (0.0)	0.0 (0.0)	0.0 (0.0)	0.0 (0.0)	0.8 (2.0)	4.9 (12)	14.1 (36)	52.4 (132.11)
Average precipitation days (≥ 0.01 in)	9.9	9.6	9.1	10.2	10.3	5.6	4.5	4.7	5.5	7.4	7.6	9.8	94.2
Average snowy days (≥ 0.1 in)	7.5	5.7	4.0	2.2	0.2	0.0	0.0	0.0	0.0	0.7	3.1	7.2	30.6
Source 1: NOAA
Source 2: National Weather Service

== Demographics ==
Historical population
Census	Pop.	Note	%±
1880	49		—
1910	2,110		—
1920	3,235		53.3%
1930	3,381		4.5%
1940	4,236		25.3%
1950	4,045		−4.5%
1960	3,640		−10.0%
1970	3,310		−9.1%
1980	3,759		13.6%
1990	3,710		−1.3%
2000	4,682		26.2%
2010	5,204		11.1%
2020	5,591		7.4%
2022 (est.)	5,994		7.2%
U.S. Decennial Census

=== 2020 census ===
As of the 2020 census, Preston had a population of 5,591. The population density was 820.0 inhabitants per square mile (316.6/km^{2}), and there were 2,025 housing units at an average density of 297.79 units per square mile (114.98 units/km^{2}).

The median age was 33.4 years. 30.5% of residents were under the age of 18 and 16.2% were 65 years of age or older. 33.8% of residents were under the age of 20; 5.7% were between the ages of 20 and 24; 24.3% were from 25 to 44; and 20.0% were from 45 to 64. The gender makeup of the city was 49.6% male and 50.4% female. For every 100 females there were 98.5 males, and for every 100 females age 18 and over there were 94.5 males age 18 and over.

0.0% of residents lived in urban areas, while 100.0% lived in rural areas.

Of the 1,932 households, 38.5% had children under the age of 18 living with them. Of all households, 60.1% were married-couple households, 21.0% were households with a female householder and no spouse or partner present, 14.8% were households with a male householder and no spouse or partner present, and 4.1% were cohabiting-couple households. About 20.6% of all households were made up of individuals, and 10.3% had someone living alone who was 65 years of age or older. The average household size was 2.85.

Of the 2,025 housing units, 4.6% were vacant. The homeowner vacancy rate was 1.2% and the rental vacancy rate was 3.7%.

Racial composition as of the 2020 census
Race	Number	Percent
White	5,025	89.9%
Black or African American	15	0.3%
American Indian and Alaska Native	55	1.0%
Asian	20	0.4%
Native Hawaiian and Other Pacific Islander	3	0.1%
Some other race	182	3.3%
Two or more races	291	5.2%
Hispanic or Latino (of any race)	444	7.9%

=== Income and poverty ===
As per the 2021 American Community Survey 5-Year Estimates, the median income was $48,651. The median income for families was $56,799, $59,205 for married-couple families, and $27,264 for non-family households. About 19.8% of the population were below the poverty line.

=== 2010 census ===
As of the census of 2010, there were 5,204 people, 1,751 households, and 1,327 families residing in the city. The population density was 782.6 inhabitants per square mile (302.2/km^{2}). There were 1,873 housing units at an average density of 281.7 units per square mile (108.8 units/km^{2}). The racial makeup of the city was 93.7% White, 0.2% African American, 0.7% Native American, 0.2% Asian, 0.1% Pacific Islander, 3.3% from other races, and 1.7% from two or more races. Hispanic or Latino residents of any race were 7.5% of the population.

There were 1,751 households, of which 42.0% had children under the age of 18 living with them, 62.9% were married couples living together, 9.3% had a female householder with no husband present, 3.5% had a male householder with no wife present, and 24.2% were non-families. 21.3% of all households were made up of individuals, and 10.8% had someone living alone who was 65 years of age or older. The average household size was 2.92 and the average family size was 3.43.

The median age in the city was 31.7 years. 33.2% of residents were under the age of 18; 8.3% were between the ages of 18 and 24; 24.1% were from 25 to 44; 19.2% were from 45 to 64; and 15.2% were 65 years of age or older. The gender makeup of the city was 49.5% male and 50.5% female.

=== 2000 census ===
As of the census of 2000, there were 4,682 people, 1,529 households, and 1,200 families residing in the city. The population density was 701.0 inhabitants per square mile (270.7/km^{2}). There were 1,640 housing units at an average density of 245.6 units per square mile (94.8 units/km^{2}).

The racial makeup of the city was 95.22% White, 5.04% Hispanic or Latino, 0.09% African American, 0.45% Native American, 0.13% Asian, 0.06% Pacific Islander, 3.12% from other races, and 0.94% from two or more races.

There were 1,529 households, out of which 44.0% had children under the age of 18 living with them, 67.2% were married couples living together, 8.0% had a female householder with no husband present, and 21.5% were non-families. 20.0% of all households were made up of individuals, and 11.4% had someone living alone who was 65 years of age or older. The average household size was 3.01 and the average family size was 3.50.

In the city, 35.3% of residents were under the age of 18, 10.5% were from 18 to 24, 24.1% from 25 to 44, 15.9% from 45 to 64, and 14.3% were 65 years of age or older. The median age was 28 years. For every 100 females, there were 95.9 males. For every 100 females age 18 and over, there were 90.2 males.

The median income for a household in the city was $35,204, and the median income for a family was $39,537. Males had a median income of $29,247 versus $20,652 for females. The per capita income for the city was $13,751. About 5.9% of families and 6.7% of the population were below the poverty line, including 5.9% of those under age 18 and 6.2% of those age 65 or over.

== Arts and culture ==
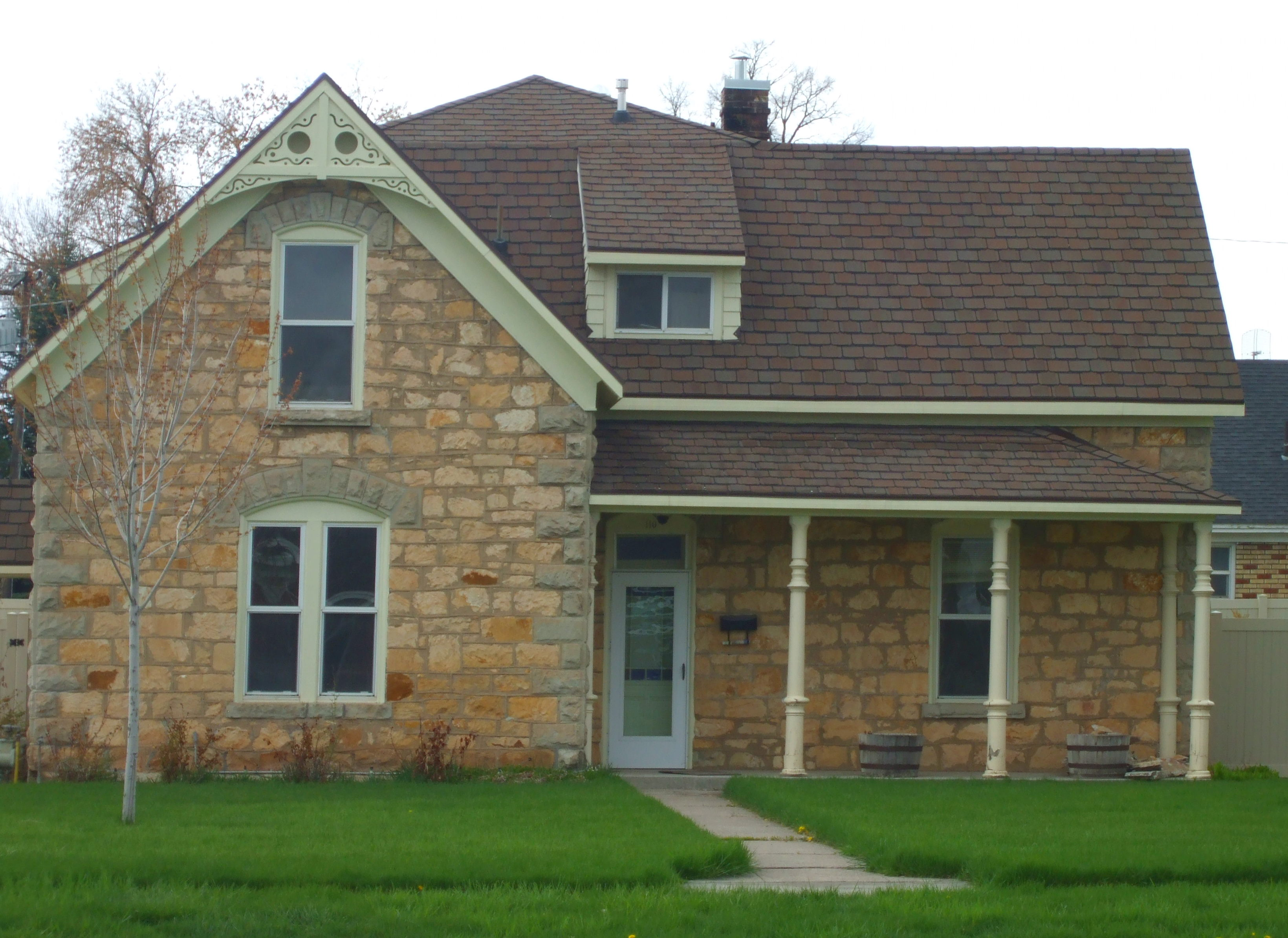
The Matthias Cowley House is one of four sites in Preston listed on the National Register of Historic Places.

=== Festivals ===
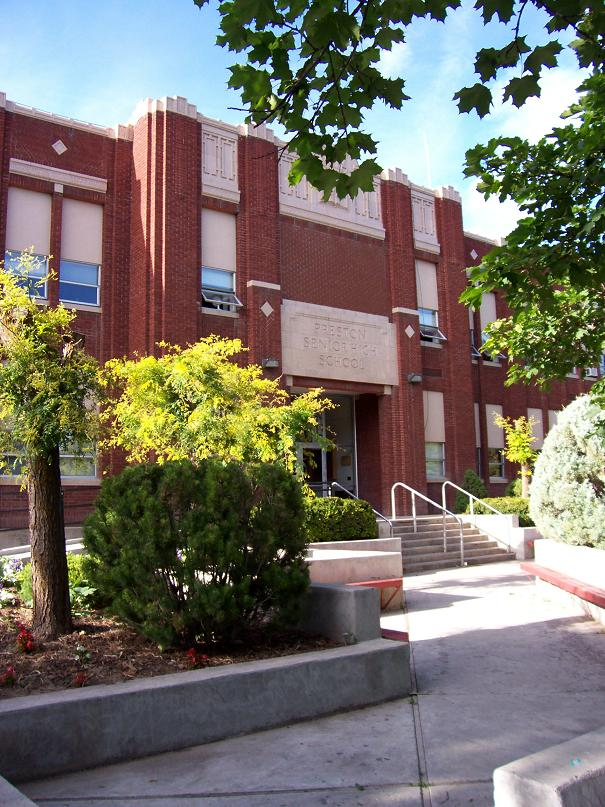
Preston High School

For several years, the city held a Napoleon Dynamite Festival in the summer.

The 2007 and 2008 event was held along with the That Famous Preston Night Rodeo in Preston.

==== Festival of Lights ====
Each year, Preston holds the Idaho Festival of Lights, which starts the day after Thanksgiving and goes until December 31.

== Education ==
Preston Joint School District 201 operates public schools, including Preston High School.

== Media ==
Much of the 2004 film Napoleon Dynamite was shot in the city of Preston, including at Preston High School, located several blocks from U.S. Highway 91. Several area landmarks can be seen throughout the film. Preston is the home of the film's creators, Jared and Jerusha Hess; Jared attended high school in Preston.

== Notable people ==
- Mervyn S. Bennion — awarded the Medal of Honor
- Leonard C. Brostrom — awarded the Medal of Honor
- L. Edward Brown — politician, general authority of the LDS church
- Ross T. Christensen — archaeologist
- Spencer J. Condie — general authority of the LDS church
- Matthew Cowley — missionary; member of the Quorum of the Twelve Apostles in the LDS church
- Earl C. Crockett — economist; served as acting president of Brigham Young University
- Richard F. Daines — commissioner of the New York State Department of Health
- Richard C. Edgley — general authority of the LDS church
- R. E. Edlefsen — four term mayor of Boise, Idaho
- Robert L. Geddes — 39th president pro tempore of the Idaho Senate
- Jared and Jerusha Hess — husband-and-wife filmmakers known for their comedy films
- Archie Johnson Inger — artist, author and religious lecturer
- Harold B. Lee (1899–1973) — educator; president of the LDS church
- Nathan K. Van Noy — awarded the Medal of Honor
