= Franklin, Idaho =

- City
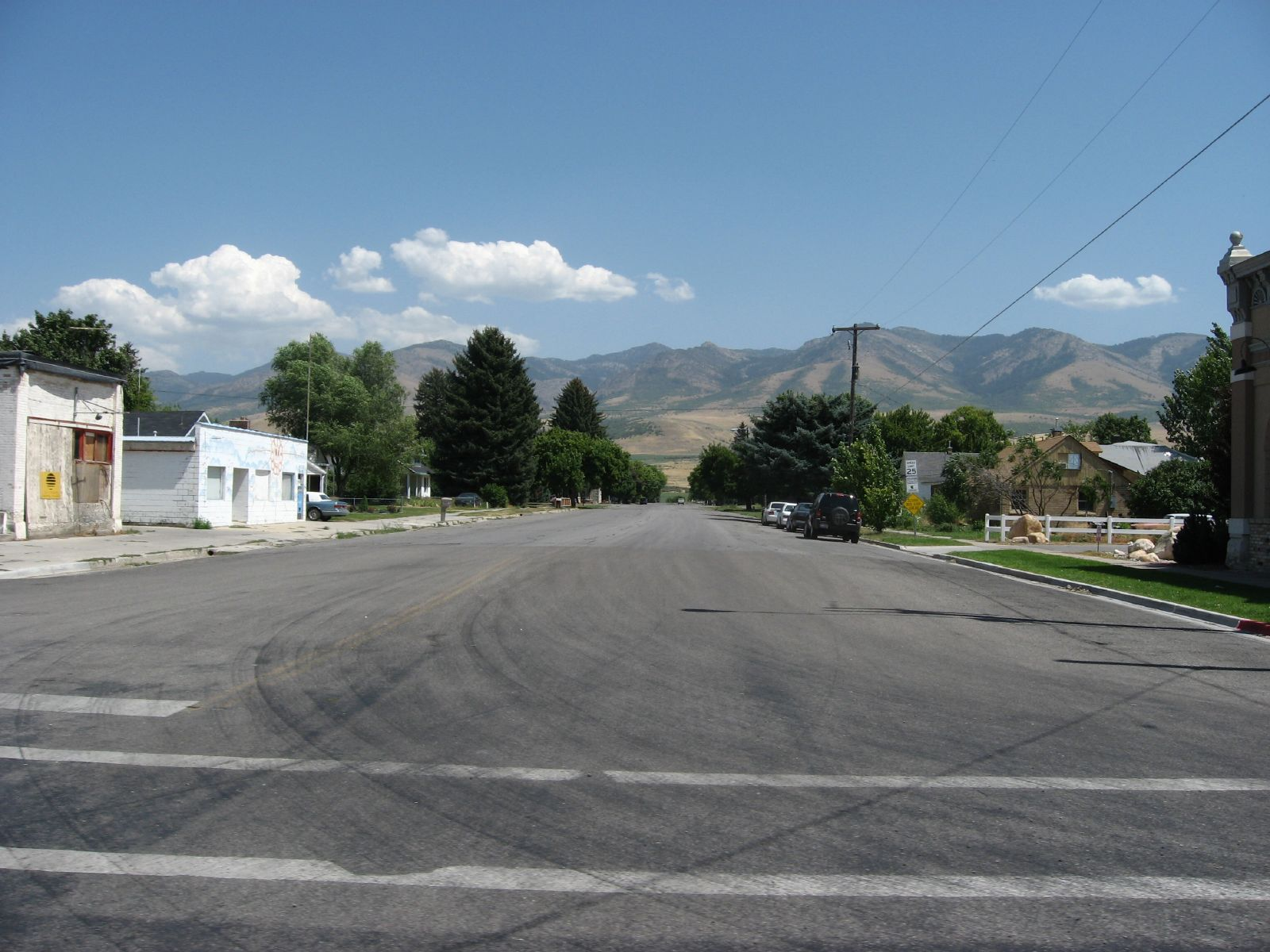
- Street Scene in Franklin

- Location of Franklin in Franklin County, Idaho
- Coordinates: 42°00′22″N 111°48′17″W
- Country: United States
- State: Idaho
- County: Franklin
- Founded: 1860

Area
  - Total: 1.33 sq mi (3.44 km^{2})
  - Land: 1.30 sq mi (3.37 km^{2})
  - Water: 0.027 sq mi (0.07 km^{2})
- Elevation: 4,505 ft (1,373 m)

Population (2020)
  - Total: 1,025
  - Density: 641/sq mi (247.6/km^{2})
- Time zone: UTC-7 (Mountain (MST))
  - Summer (DST): UTC-6 (MDT)
- ZIP code: 83237
- Area code: 208
- FIPS code: 16-28810
- GNIS feature ID: 2410539
- Website: franklinidaho.org

Franklin is a city in Franklin County, Idaho, United States. The population was 1,025 at the 2020 census. It is part of the Logan, Utah-Idaho Metropolitan Statistical Area.

== History ==
The town was founded by Mormon pioneers led by Thomas S. Smart on April 14, 1860, in what was then Washington Territory, although at the time it was believed the settlement was within the bounds of Utah Territory. The town was named for Franklin Richards, an Apostle for the Church of Jesus Christ of Latter-day Saints. Franklin is the first permanent European settlement in present-day Idaho. Its political status remained ambiguous until an 1872 survey determined the townsite was in Idaho Territory about 1-mile (1.6 km) north of the Utah Territory border. The area within the town limits was platted into square blocks in 1864.

Part of the 2004 comedy film Napoleon Dynamite were shot near Franklin. The chicken farm scenes were filmed on Ritewood Egg Farms property, and the supervisor's character is loosely based on Marlow Woodward, a late Franklin resident and one of the farm's founders.

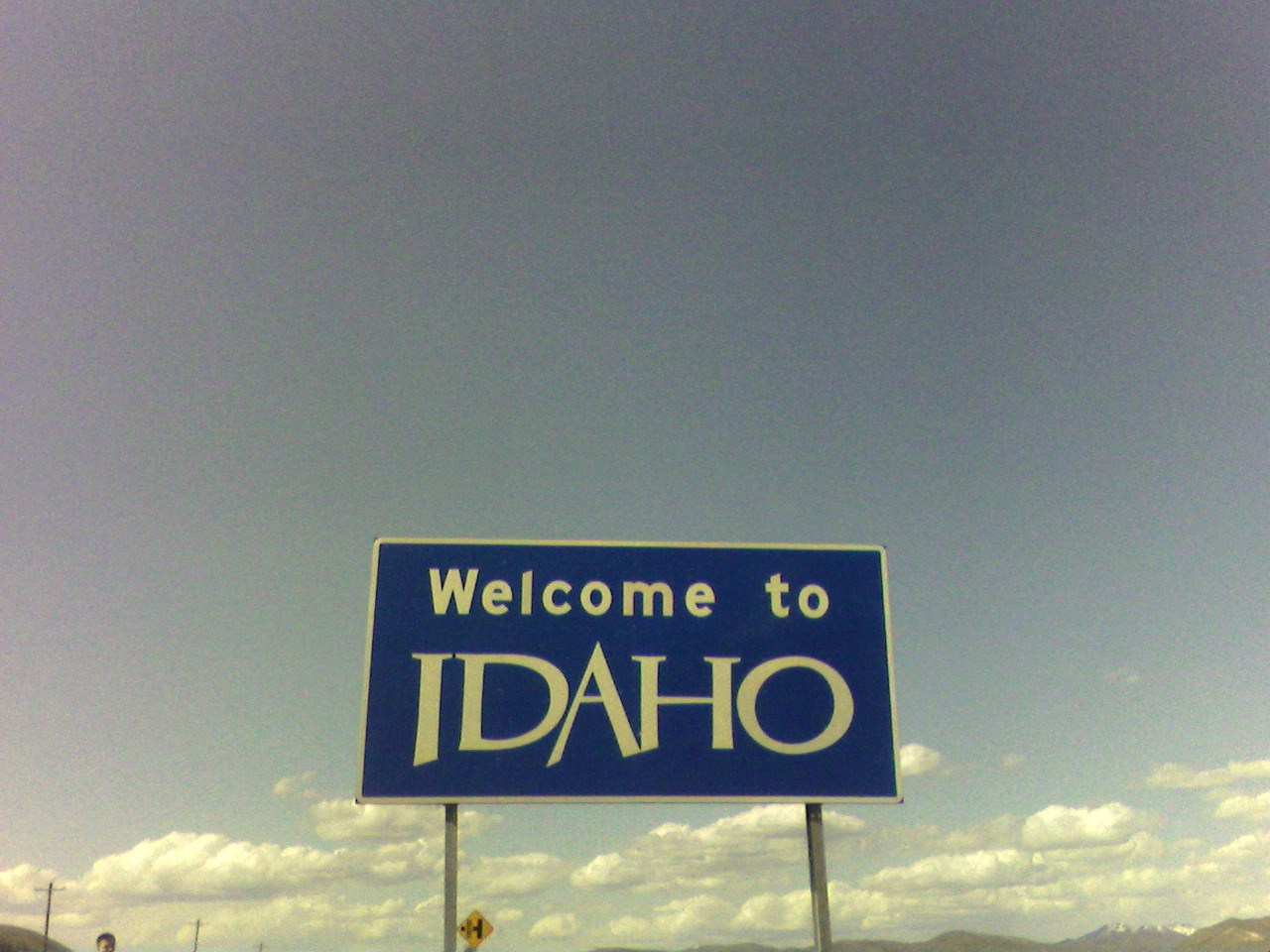
Welcome sign near Franklin

== Geography ==
According to the United States Census Bureau, the city has a total area of 1.29 square miles (3.34 km^{2}), of which, 1.26 square miles (3.26 km^{2}) is land and 0.03 square miles (0.08 km^{2}) is water.

== Demographics ==
Historical population
Census	Pop.	Note	%±
1900	435		—
1910	534		22.8%
1920	589		10.3%
1930	531		−9.8%
1940	523		−1.5%
1950	467		−10.7%
1960	446		−4.5%
1970	402		−9.9%
1980	423		5.2%
1990	478		13.0%
2000	641		34.1%
2010	641		0.0%
2020	1,025		59.9%
U.S. Decennial Census

=== 2020 census ===
As of the 2020 census, Franklin had a population of 1,025. The median age was 29.1 years. 33.5% of residents were under the age of 18 and 10.5% of residents were 65 years of age or older. For every 100 females there were 100.6 males, and for every 100 females age 18 and over there were 100.6 males age 18 and over.

0.0% of residents lived in urban areas, while 100.0% lived in rural areas.

There were 320 households in Franklin, of which 50.0% had children under the age of 18 living in them. Of all households, 65.6% were married-couple households, 13.4% were households with a male householder and no spouse or partner present, and 15.6% were households with a female householder and no spouse or partner present. About 15.7% of all households were made up of individuals and 7.2% had someone living alone who was 65 years of age or older.

There were 331 housing units, of which 3.3% were vacant. The homeowner vacancy rate was 2.3% and the rental vacancy rate was 0.0%.

Racial composition as of the 2020 census
Race	Number	Percent
White	865	84.4%
Black or African American	4	0.4%
American Indian and Alaska Native	6	0.6%
Asian	1	0.1%
Native Hawaiian and Other Pacific Islander	0	0.0%
Some other race	100	9.8%
Two or more races	49	4.8%
Hispanic or Latino (of any race)	150	14.6%

=== 2010 census ===
As of the census of 2010, there were 641 people, 221 households, and 155 families living in the city. The population density was 508.7 inhabitants per square mile (196.4/km^{2}). There were 236 housing units at an average density of 187.3 units per square mile (72.3 units/km^{2}). The racial makeup of the city was 91.1% White, 0.5% African American, 0.5% Native American, 6.2% from other races, and 1.7% from two or more races. Hispanic or Latino of any race were 13.1% of the population.

There were 221 households, of which 42.5% had children under the age of 18 living with them, 62.4% were married couples living together, 5.0% had a female householder with no husband present, 2.7% had a male householder with no wife present, and 29.9% were non-families. 26.7% of all households were made up of individuals, and 12.2% had someone living alone who was 65 years of age or older. The average household size was 2.90 and the average family size was 3.61.

The median age in the city was 29.9 years. 34.3% of residents were under the age of 18; 9.8% were between the ages of 18 and 24; 23.9% were from 25 to 44; 19.2% were from 45 to 64; and 12.6% were 65 years of age or older. The gender makeup of the city was 49.8% male and 50.2% female.

=== 2000 census ===
As of the census of 2000, there were 641 people, 195 households, and 156 families living in the city. The population density was 839.0 inhabitants per square mile (323.9/km^{2}). There were 219 housing units at an average density of 286.6 units per square mile (110.7 units/km^{2}). The racial makeup of the city was 88.92% White, 0.16% Native American, 9.05% from other races, and 1.87% from two or more races. Hispanic or Latino of any race were 9.67% of the population.

There were 195 households, out of which 47.7% had children under the age of 18 living with them, 69.2% were married couples living together, 5.1% had a female householder with no husband present, and 20.0% were non-families. 17.9% of all households were made up of individuals, and 10.8% had someone living alone who was 65 years of age or older. The average household size was 3.29 and the average family size was 3.79.

In the city, the population was spread out, with 40.1% under the age of 18, 8.9% from 18 to 24, 26.8% from 25 to 44, 14.7% from 45 to 64, and 9.5% who were 65 years of age or older. The median age was 26 years. For every 100 females, there were 94.2 males. For every 100 females age 18 and over, there were 101.0 males.

The median income for a household in the city was $33,026, and the median income for a family was $34,191. Males had a median income of $27,417 versus $24,000 for females. The per capita income for the city was $10,346. About 10.9% of families and 14.1% of the population were below the poverty line, including 19.0% of those under age 18 and 10.3% of those age 65 or over.
