= Virtuos =

Singaporean video game developer

Virtuos Ltd
- Type: Private
- Industry: Video games
- Founded: December 2004; 21 years ago in Shanghai, China
- Headquarters: Fusionopolis, Singapore
- Number of locations: 25 offices (2025)
- Key people: Gilles Langourieux; (CEO); Jasmine Cheong; (CFO); Samuel Stevenin; (managing director, art division); Christophe Gandon; (managing director, games division)
- Number of employees: 4,000 (2025)
- Subsidiaries: Sparx* Studios; Black Shamrock; CounterPunch; Volmi Games; Glass Egg Digital Media; Beyond-FX; Third Kind Games; Pipeworks Studios; Umanaïa Interactive
- Website: virtuosgames.com

Virtuos Ltd is a Singaporean video game development company headquartered in Fusionopolis, Singapore, with studios across Asia, Europe, and North America. Virtuos specializes in game development and art production for AAA consoles, PC, and mobile titles. Virtuos does not develop its own original games; instead, it works as an external developer for other companies.

== History ==
Virtuos was established in Shanghai in December 2004 and opened its European office in Paris in July 2005. In June 2006, it received investment from Legend Capital. Virtuos opened its Chengdu office in January 2008 and Vancouver offices in January and November 2008, respectively. In March 2009, the company acquired BSP Audio Production Studios. In May 2009 Terminator Salvation was released in theaters, featuring 3D art made by Virtuos.

Virtuos entered Japan after signing a partnership with Kyos in December 2009. In March 2010, it reached 500 employees, and announced new-gen work-for-hire game development. In May 2010, the company ported The Price is Right to the PlayStation Network.

Virtuos produced Monster Jam: Path of Destruction for the PlayStation 3, Xbox 360, Wii, Nintendo DS and PlayStation Portable. Subsequently, it reached 800 employees and signed a work-for-hire online game development agreement with Tencent in August 2011. Virtuos acquired Sparx* Animation Studios in September 2011, increasing its employee count to over 900.

In 2012, Virtuos opened its Xi’an office in May and reached the 1,000 employees mark in October. Within the same year, Virtuos also released its first fully developed Facebook game - The Enchanted Library for GSN, as well as its first Android game, NBA 2013, for client 2K sports on the Wii, Nintendo DS and PlayStation Portable.

In July 2013, Virtuos opened an office in San Francisco. Virtuos ported XCOM: Enemy Unknown to IOS in October 2013, and won the Golden Joystick Award for "Best Mobile/Tablet Game of the Year". The company also developed Fangs Dash for China Mobile Game Entertainment in December 2013.

Virtuos also developed ports of Final Fantasy X and Final Fantasy X-2 for the PlayStation 3 and PlayStation Vita in April 2014. In December 2014, Virtuos started its operations in South Korea.

In July 2016, Virtuos ported Batman: Return To Arkham to the Xbox One and PlayStation 4. In February 2017, the company acquired Black Shamrock. In March 2018, it raised $15M and set up a new headquarters and R&D center in Singapore.

Virtuos provided art support on 2017's Horizon Zero Dawn and 2022's Horizon Forbidden West. In August 2020, Virtuos ported Horizon Zero Dawn to Microsoft Windows.

Virtuos Montreal was launched in September 2019. In October 2020, the company acquired CounterPunch Studios.

In May 2020, Virtuos developed the Nintendo Switch version of XCOM 2 jointly with Firaxis Games. In June 2020, Virtuos developed the Switch port for The Outer Worlds.

Virtuos secured $150M investment from Baring Private Equity Asia in September 2021. It subsequently opened a new studio in Lyon, France in December 2021. In January 2022, Virtuos acquired Volmi Games in Kyiv, Ukraine.

In April 2022, Virtuos announced its investment in Umanaïa Interactive, an up-and-coming game development studio in Quebec, Canada.

In May 2022, it was announced that Virtuos had acquired the Ho Chi Minh City-based 2D and 3D art production company, Glass Egg Digital Media. That was followed by the official launch of Virtuos Kuala Lumpur in Malaysia in August 2022, and co-development studio Calypte — a Virtuos Studio in the San Francisco Bay Area in September 2022. In October 2023, the company confirmed the closure of Calypte, citing it as an "isolated decision and will not affect other studio locations".

In October 2022, Virtuos developed NieR:Automata The End of YoRHa Edition for the Nintendo Switch which has been hailed as a “miracle port”. Virtuos also unveiled a new studio, Virtuos Labs - Montpellier, which will provide various support to partners such as creating new tools for proprietary engines and shifting to new engines.

In March 2023, Virtuos developed a remaster for The Outer Worlds, subtitled Spacer's Choice Edition. The remaster's initial reviews were largely focused on performance issues such as stuttering, which were partly addressed in a v1.1 patch - the first of a series of updates to fix known issues and optimise performance across all platforms.

On March 17, 2023, Glass Egg, one of Virtuos’ subsidiaries, announced the launch of its new 2D and 3D art production studio located in Dalat, Vietnam.

In May 2023, Konami confirmed Virtuos was assisting in the development of Metal Gear Solid Δ: Snake Eater, a remake of Metal Gear Solid 3: Snake Eater for PlayStation 5, Windows, and Xbox Series X/S.

In March 2024, Virtuos acquired Beyond-FX, a full-service visual effects (VFX) studio in Los Angeles.In August 2024, Virtuos acquired British indie developer Third Kind Games.

On December 10, 2024, CD Projekt revealed in a livestream that Virtuos co-developed a new update for their game Cyberpunk 2077 and will also help with the development of future updates to the game.

In January 2025, Virtuos acquired Pipeworks Studios, Umanaïa Interactive and Abstraction.

In July 2025, Virtuos announced that they would layoff around 270 employees, representing approximately 7% of their workforce.

On December 14, 2025, Virtuos announced that an agreement was reached with the founders of Abstraction to perform a management buyout, allowing the studio to regain its independence.

== Games co-developed by Virtuos ==
Release	Title	Platform
2006	Street Riders	PSP
2007	Asphalt: Urban GT 2	PSP, Nintendo DS
2007	Beowulf	PSP
2007	Dora the Explorer	Leapster Explorer
2007	Hannah Montana	Leapfrog Didj
2007	Indiana Jones	Leapfrog Didj
2007	SpongeBob SquarePants: the Clam Prix	Leapster Explorer
2007	Wolverine	Leapfrog Didj
2008	Crash: Mind over Mutant	PSP
2008	Hot Wheels Battle Force 5	Nintendo DS
2008	The Price is Right	PS3, iPad
2008	Speed Racer	Nintendo DS
2009	Family Feud	PS3, iPad
2009	Madagascar Kartz	Nintendo DS
2009	MotorStorm: Arctic Edge	PS2
2009	Pimp My Ride: Street Racing	PS2, Nintendo DS
2009	Press Your Luck	PS3, iPad
2010	Ghost Recon Predator	PSP
2010	Hole in the Wall	Xbox 360 Kinect
2011	Civilization Revolution	WP7
2011	DreamWorks Super Star Kartz	Nintendo DS
2011	The Enchanted Library	Facebook
2011	Family Feud Decades	PSN
2011	The Game of Life	PC, MacOS
2011	Generator Rex: Agent of Providence	PS3, Xbox 360, Nintendo Wii, 3DS, Nintendo DS
2011	Hollywood Squares	PSN
2011	MLB 2K11	PSP, PS2, Nintendo DS
2011	MLB 2K12	PSP, PS2, Nintendo DS, Nintendo Wii
2011	Might & Magic Heroes VI: Shades of Darkness	PC
2011	Monopoly Collection	Nintendo Wii
2011	Monster Jam: Path of Destruction	PS3, Xbox 360, Nintendo Wii, Nintendo DS, PSP
2011	NBA 2K12	PS2
2011	The Price is Right: Decades	Xbox 360
2011	Sid Meier's Pirates!	Nintendo Wii
2011	Who Wants to be a Millionaire 2012 Edition	Xbox 360
2012	Bubble Safari	iOS, Android
2012	NBA 2K13	Android, Wii, PSP, PS2
2012	XCOM: Enemy Unknown	iOS
2013	Fable Anniversary	Xbox 360
2013	Injustice: Gods Among Us	Android
2013	NBA 2K14	iOS/Android/FireOs
2014	Assassin's Creed Liberation Remastered	PS4, PC, Xbox One
2015	LeapFrog Kart Racing Supercharged	LeapTV
2016	Assassin's Creed: The Ezio Collection	PS4, Xbox One
2016	Batman: Return to Arkham	PS4, Xbox One
2016	Final Fantasy X/X-2 HD Remaster	PS3, PS Vita, PS4, PC, Xbox One, Nintendo Switch
2016	Heavy Rain	PS4
2017	Final Fantasy XII: The Zodiac Age	PS4, PC, Xbox One, Nintendo Switch
2017	Horizon Zero Dawn	PS4, PC
2017	Injustice 2	PC, PS4, Xbox One, IOS, Android
2017	L.A. Noire	PS4, Xbox One, Nintendo Switch
2017	L.A. Noire: The VR Case Files	PC, PS4
2018	Dark Souls Remastered	Nintendo Switch
2018	Shadow of the Tomb Raider	PC, PS4, Xbox One, MacOS, Linux, Stadia
2018	Starlink: Battle for Atlas	Nintendo Switch
2019	Astral Chain	Nintendo Switch
2019	Monster Jam Steel Titans	Stadia
2019	Star Wars Jedi: Fallen Order	PC, PS5, PS4, Xbox One, Xbox Series X/S
2019	Vader Immortal: A Star Wars VR Series	PlayStation VR
2020	BioShock: The Collection	Nintendo Switch
2020	Cyberpunk 2077	PC, PS4, PS5, Xbox One, Xbox Series
2020	The Dark Pictures Anthology: Little Hope	PC, Nintendo Switch, PS4, PS5, Xbox One, Xbox Series
2020	Destroy All Humans!	Nintendo Switch
2020	Medal of Honor: Above and Beyond	Oculus Rift
2020	The Outer Worlds	Nintendo Switch
2020	PUBG: Battlegrounds	Stadia
2021	Kena: Bridge of Spirits	PC, Nintendo Switch 2, PS4, PS5, Xbox One, Xbox Series
2021	The Dark Pictures Anthology: House of Ashes	PC, PS4, PS5, Xbox One, Xbox Series
2021	The Lord of the Rings: The Card Game	
2021	Outriders	
2021	XCOM 2 Collection	Nintendo Switch
2022	The Callisto Protocol	PS5, PS4, Xbox One, Xbox Series X/S, PC
2022	The Dark Pictures Anthology: The Devil in Me	PC, PS4, PS5, Xbox One, Xbox Series
2022	Gundam Evolution	PS4, PS5, Xbox One, Xbox Series X/S
2022	Marvel's Midnight Suns	PS5, PS4, Xbox One, Xbox Series X/S
2022	Monster Jam Steel Titans 2	Nintendo Switch
2022	NieR Automata: End of Yorha Edition	Nintendo Switch
2022	The Quarry	PC, PS4, PS5, Xbox One, Xbox Series
2023	AEW: Fight Forever	PC, PS5, PS4, Nintendo Switch, Xbox Series, Xbox One
2023	Call of Duty: Modern Warfare III	PC, PS5, PS4, Xbox Series, Xbox One
2023	The Dark Pictures: Switchback VR	PS5
2023	Dead Island 2	PC, PS4, PS5, Xbox One, Xbox Series, Amazon Luna, MacOS
2023	Disney Speedstorm	PC, Windows Apps, PS5, PS4, Nintendo Switch, Xbox Series, Xbox One
2023	Dying Light: Platinum Edition	Nintendo Switch
2023	Final Fantasy XVI	PC, PS5, Xbox Series
2023	Hogwarts Legacy	PC, Xbox Series, Xbox One
2023	Horizon Forbidden West - Complete Edition	PC, PS5
2023	Horizon Call of the Mountain	PS5
2023	Kerbal Space Program 2	PS4, PS5, Xbox One, Series X/S
2023	Mahokenshi	PC
2023	Mortal Kombat 1	PC, Nintendo Switch, PS5, Xbox Series
2023	Star Wars Jedi: Survivor	PC, PS4, PS5, Xbox One, Xbox Series
2023	The Outer Worlds: Spacer's Choice Edition	PC, Windows Apps, PS5, Xbox Series
2023	The Settlers: New Allies	PC, PS4, Nintendo Switch, Xbox Series, Xbox One
2023	The Settlers Online	PS4, Xbox One, Nintendo Switch
2024	Beyond Good & Evil: 20th Anniversary Edition	PC, Nintendo Switch, PS5, PS4, Xbox Series, Xbox One
2024	Final Fantasy VII Rebirth	PC, PS5, Xbox Series, Nintendo Switch 2
2024	Outcast: A New Beginning	PC, PS5, Xbox Series
2024	South Park: Snow Day!	PC, PS5, Xbox, Nintendo Switch
2024	Stellar Blade	PC, PS5
2024	Suicide Squad: Kill the Justice League	PC, PS5, Xbox Series
2024	The Casting of Frank Stone	PC, PS5, Xbox Series
2024	Until Dawn	PC, PS5
2025	Metal Gear Solid Delta: Snake Eater	PC, PS5, Xbox Series
2025	Metroid Prime 4: Beyond	Nintendo Switch, Nintendo Switch 2
2025	Sonic Racing: CrossWorlds	PC, Nintendo Switch 2, Nintendo Switch, PS5, PS4, Xbox Series, Xbox One
2025	Split Fiction	PC, PS5, Xbox Series, Nintendo Switch 2
2025	The Elder Scrolls IV: Oblivion Remastered	PC, PS5, Xbox Series, Nintendo Switch 2
2026	Forza Horizon 6	PC, Xbox Series
2026	Gears of War: E-Day	PC, Xbox Series
2026	Subnautica 2	PC, Xbox Series
2026	Kiln	PC, PS5, Xbox Series
2026	Marathon	PC, PS5, Xbox Series
2026	Crimson Moon	PC, PS5, Xbox Series
