= Terra Invicta =

- Developer: Pavonis Interactive
- Publisher: Hooded Horse
- Engine: Unity
- Platform: Windows
- Release: January 5, 2026
- Genres: Grand strategy
- Mode: Single-player

Terra Invicta is a science fiction grand strategy video game developed by Pavonis Interactive and published by Hooded Horse for Windows that was released in January 2026, following an early access release in September 2022. The game is set during an alien invasion of Earth, and has players control a human faction and complete their geopolitical objectives while colonizing space. Terra Invicta represents the first game that developer Pavonis Interactive has developed independently after their previous modding work with Long War for XCOM: Enemy Unknown. Reception to the early access release has been generally positive.

== Gameplay ==
The Earth section of Terra Invicta features political intrigue between factions while alien incidents simultaneously occur around the world.

In Terra Invicta, the player controls one of seven factions on Earth, each with their own goals and unique asymmetric ways to reach victory, as well as differing relations and rivalries based on their ideological beliefs. The game is split into two largely separated, yet interconnected parts. The first part is a geopolitical simulation on Earth, where the factions fight for influence in Earth's nations through methods ranging from espionage and military actions to research and development and industrialization. The other section of the game is a simulation of humanity's expansion into the Solar System in light of the encroaching alien threat, including the widespread militarization and industrialization of space as each faction vies for resources and control. Transferring resources from Earth to space takes extra resources because of gravity, incentivizing the player to build space infrastructure outside of Earth's atmosphere.

Later in the early-to-mid game, factions can build warships using shipyards. There are 13 different ship types in the game which include, in size order: fighters, gunships, escorts, corvettes, frigates, monitors, destroyers, cruisers, battlecruisers, battleships, dreadnoughts, and titans. Ships could have many different weapons such as Railguns, Coilguns, Particle beam Weapons, Missiles and Torpedoes, and Lasers.

== Setting ==
The base game of Terra Invicta is set after January 31, 2026, when an alien spacecraft crash-lands on Earth. More spacecraft are detected to be approaching Earth from the Kuiper belt with hostile intent, part of an alien species that lost their homeworld to a powerful alien empire and now seek to neuter similar highly-developed intelligent species that could pose a threat, such as humanity, through "domestication". To "domesticate" humanity, the aliens send space probes to gather intelligence on Earth, while abducting and mind-controlling humans to serve as spies and remotely defeat humanity through infighting.

In the aftermath of first contact, various conflicting political movements arise based on how humanity should proceed that deeply influence the nations of Earth: The Resistance, an internationalist anti-alien coalition seeking to repel the aliens from the Solar System and secure humanity's independence; The Servants, a pro-alien global cult bent on supporting the aliens; Humanity First, a fanatically xenophobic force seeking to genocide the aliens and exterminate their human sympathizers; The Protectorate, a collaborationist movement seeking appeasement with the aliens while researching their species and motives; The Initiative, a kleptocratic conspiracy seeking to exploit the extraterrestrial crisis for personal gain; The Academy, a scientific organization seeking to form an equal galactic alliance between humanity and the aliens; and Project Exodus, a space colonization project led under the belief that humanity must abandon Earth to avoid the alien threat. The aliens themselves and their controlled territories are represented by a non-player faction, the Alien Administration, which seeks world domination on the pretense of "solving Earth's problems".

== Development ==
After developing the Long War mod for XCOM: Enemy Unknown, the volunteers who had worked on the mod were contacted by Firaxis Games and paid to help with development for day-one mods and a Long War 2 mod for XCOM 2, the latter of which they received compensation for from Firaxis. After gaining experience working on both mods, the volunteers came together and formed a company called Long War Studios, which they eventually rebranded as Pavonis Interactive, and announced the development of Terra Invicta, their own grand strategy game. The game began development in 2017. In 2020, Pavonis Interactive launched a Kickstarter campaign to help fund development which quickly met its goal and eventually raised $216,000 at closing. The game was delayed in late 2021 until a 2022 early access release date. In January 2026, the game ended early access and launched its version 1.0, which sets the default starting year for gameplay to 2026. According to the developers, numerous concepts and mechanics remained to be implemented. These included new game scenarios such as a Cold War starting scenario and an alien invasion scenario set during Earth's post-nuclear reconstruction, alongside broader systems like loyalty mechanics, global environmental tipping points, refugee management, and more.

== Reception ==
Reception

Aggregate scores
Aggregator	Score
Metacritic	83/100
OpenCritic	89% recommend

Terra Invicta received generally favorable reviews from critics, according to the review aggregation website Metacritic. Fellow review aggregator OpenCritic assessed that the game received strong approval, being recommended by 89% of critics.

Critical reception to Terra Invicta's early access release has focused on its ambitious and interesting gameplay along with its complicated systems. IGN's Jon Bolding remarked that the gameplay was interesting and fun to play, but criticized the game's obtuse mechanics. PC Gamer's Leana Hafer noted that "the barrier to entry is high" but felt that she was "captivated by how it all comes together and delivers on its sky high promises while telling a compelling story with so many twists and turns." Vice's Renata Price noted in her initial thoughts on the game from playing just the very beginning of it that "it is possibly the densest game I've ever played, and I think I'm in love with it."

== See also ==
- Sid Meier's Alpha Centauri – similarly themed game
