= Marvel's Midnight Suns =

2022 video game

- Developer: Firaxis Games
- Publisher: 2K
- Director: Jake Solomon
- Producer: Garth DeAngelis
- Designer: Joe Weinhoffer
- Programmer: Michael Springer
- Artists: Dennis Moellers; Greg Foertsch
- Writers: Chad Rocco; Steve Ogden; Scott Wittbecker
- Composers: Tim Wynn; Phill Boucher
- Engine: Unreal Engine 4
- Platforms: PlayStation 5; Windows; Xbox Series X/S; PlayStation 4; Xbox One
- Release: December 2, 2022: PS5, Windows, Xbox Series X/S; December 2, 2022; PS4, Xbox One; May 11, 2023
- Genre: Tactical role-playing
- Mode: Single-player

Marvel's Midnight Suns is a 2022 tactical role-playing game developed by Firaxis Games and published by 2K. The game features comic book characters from multiple Marvel Comics properties, such as Midnight Sons, Avengers, X-Men, and Runaways. Players are able to create their own superhero named "The Hunter", who must lead other characters to rebel against Lilith, the "mother of demons", as she attempts to bring her master, Chthon, back to life. Combat in the game is turn-based and mixed with deck-building. Between combat missions, players manage their base of operations called "The Abbey" which they can walk around in a third-person view, research upgrades, interact with the game's cast of characters and build friendships with them.

Marvel Games approached Firaxis Games for the development of a new Marvel project in 2017, after being impressed by their work on the modern XCOM games. Initially, the team attempted to apply the XCOM gameplay formula, such as a focus on cover system and permadeath, on Midnight Suns, though they were scrapped as they realized that they did not make thematic sense in a game centered on powerful superheroes. Its deck-building gameplay was inspired by games such as Slay the Spire, while its social elements were inspired by Japanese role-playing games such as Fire Emblem and Persona. The game was inspired by Saturday morning cartoons, and Rise of the Midnight Sons and Inferno were the comic book events that influenced the game's setting and characters.

Midnight Suns released for PlayStation 5, Windows, and Xbox Series X/S on December 2, 2022. PlayStation 4 and Xbox One versions were released on May 11, 2023. A Nintendo Switch version was also planned but later canceled. The game received generally positive reviews, with critics praising the game's strategic gameplay, narrative, and its focus on relationship building with Marvel heroes. Its writing, however, has been criticized. It was nominated for Strategy/Simulation Game of the Year at the 26th Annual D.I.C.E. Awards. Despite the game's strong critical reception, it was a commercial failure for its publisher. Firaxis released four downloadable content packs which follow the Midnight Suns as they fight against Dracula and his forces of vampires.

== Gameplay ==
Combat in Midnight Suns is turn-based, though it also features elements commonly found in deck-building games.

Midnight Suns is a tactical role-playing game. Players take the role of "The Hunter", the child of Lilith, as they lead a selection of heroes in various missions to defeat her. Combat is turn-based, mixed with deck-building. Each hero, including the Hunter, has their own customizable deck of eight cards. At the start of each mission, players choose three heroes to take into battle, with their decks combined into one that is to be drawn from each round. In each turn, players have three Card Plays, two opportunities to redraw cards, and a chance to move and reposition one of their heroes. The heroes will automatically move to attack their enemy after a card is chosen.

There are three types of cards: Attack, Skill, and Heroic. Attack cards deal damage to enemies, some of which have a "knockback" effect, allowing players to push them towards environmental hazards or other allies for additional damages. Skill cards play a support role, such as healing characters, redrawing cards, and applying status effects on both the heroes and enemies. Heroic cards are powerful attacks that resemble the iconic abilities of each hero. Using Heroic attacks consumes "Heroism", a resource that is generated through using Skill and Attack cards. Players can also take advantage of items in the battlefield to launch environmental attacks, which consume Heroism but do not consume a card. Combat typically occurs in an arena where the player's squad of heroes must battle several waves of enemies. Some cards have a "quick" property, which refunds a Card Play to the squad if the card defeats an enemy. This allows players to chain the use of several cards together without using up any Card Plays.

The base game includes 13 playable characters (Blade, Captain America, Captain Marvel, Doctor Strange, Ghost Rider, Hulk, the Hunter, Iron Man, Magik, Nico Minoru, Scarlet Witch, Spider-Man and Wolverine), with four additional characters (Deadpool, Morbius, Venom and Storm) released as DLC. Each hero has their own unique skills and abilities, and plays different roles in combat. For instance, Scarlet Witch specializes in abilities that can deal area of effect damage, Blade has cards that allow him to attack enemies and drain their health, and Magik can reposition enemies by sending them through portals. Players can customize the Hunter and their superpowers from over 40 different abilities. The Hunter has three types of abilities: Light skills, which focus on supporting the team and generating heroic points; Dark abilities, which deal powerful damage to enemies at the cost of the Hunter's health or heroic points; and Power skills, which provide a balanced mix between offense and defense. Eventually, players will obtain a neck collar and outfits, which also grant them passive perks. While the Hunter exists as a blank slate for the player, players can align them towards the light side or the dark side for role-playing purpose through ability usage and interacting with other heroes. Players can also play as The Hunter's pet, Hellhound Charlie, in specific missions.

=== The Abbey ===
Between combat missions, players manage their base of operations called "The Abbey" which they can walk around in a third-person view to explore the grounds and interact with other heroes. At the Forge, players can analyze gamma coils collected from each mission, and unlock new cards for the heroes who participated in the preceding mission. Some missions also reward players with "artifacts"; analyzing them raises the research level, allowing players to upgrade the Abbey with new rooms and areas, and build an item station that allows players to craft cards for single-use items for combat. In the yard, the Hunter can spar with other heroes, heal injured characters, and upgrade their cards. Upgrading cards requires the player to have at least two copies of the same card, and consumes "essence", which are also earned through missions or recycling duplicated cards. Mods can also be applied to each card to add additional perks. Players can also send characters for Hero Ops through the C.E.N.T.R.A.L. workstation, and start main and optional missions by accessing the Mirror Table at the War Room.

After each combat mission, players can interact with other heroes, or participate in a "Hangout" or a "club meeting" in the Abbey. Players must select the activities that cater to the interest of a hero in order to gain maximum friendship with them. Purchasing an appropriate gift, as well as choosing the response that aligns with that hero's morality, will further boost the friendship XP gained in a hangout. With a high relationship level, the hero will open themselves up to the Hunter, and unlock additional costumes, the hero's legendary skills, and challenge levels. The area surrounding the Abbey can also be explored. As players progress, they will gain "Words of Power" which allow the Hunter to use magical powers to open up blocked paths. Through exploration, players will encounter optional puzzles, treasure chests, Tarot Card collectibles, and Havens, which are locations for special Hangouts.

== Synopsis ==
Hydra scientist Doctor Faustus uses dark magic and science to resurrect Lilith in the hopes of using her to help Hydra conquer the world. Six months later, a star called the "Midnight Sun" approaches Earth, destabilizing magic and heralding the return of Lilith's master, Chthon.

Doctor Strange and Iron Man attempt to get a page of the Darkhold called the Parchment of Power from Johnny Blaze, but he refuses. After being alerted to magic converging at the Sanctum Sanctorum, the two are joined by Carol Danvers and return to aid Wanda Maximoff in fighting Lilith and a Hydra squad until Strange can create a mystic shield to repel them. Realizing the Avengers are outmatched, Strange leaves Maximoff to maintain the shield while he takes Stark and Danvers to the Abbey to recruit the Midnight Suns — Nico Minoru, Magik, Blade, and Robbie Reyes — and Lilith's estranged sister, the Caretaker, to resurrect the Hunter, Lilith's child and killer. During the resurrection ritual, the Hunter's collar emits dark magic, forcing Minoru to complete the spell. Strange attempts to contact Maximoff for help in restoring the Hunter's memories, but learns she is in trouble. He, the Hunter, and Blade travel to the Sanctum, where they learn Lilith has enthralled Venom to help her destroy the shield and abduct Maximoff. Venom overpowers the Hunter until Spider-Man intervenes, allowing the heroes to retreat.

After learning the Midnight Sun's gamma energy is preventing Bruce Banner from transforming into the Hulk, the heroes recruit Spider-Man before capturing Faustus to learn Lilith's next objective. Although Hydra operative Crossbones kills him before he can talk, they find Faustus' journal and learn Hydra is stealing artifacts from the Sanctum. Meanwhile, Crossbones hires Sabretooth to kill the Hunter, but he is wounded by Wolverine and later enthralled by Lilith, who destroys Avengers Tower to steal a gamma accelerator and enthralls Banner. The Hunter and Stark recruit Steve Rogers, and the Hunter joins Minoru and Magik in using a divination spell to teleport to a Hydra base, where Banner uses the accelerator to empower an enthralled Maximoff. Unable to reason with her, the heroes retreat.

While stopping an attack by Lilith's demons, the heroes recruit Wolverine and fashion a new suit for the Hunter so they can bypass the Hydra base's mystic defenses. With the help of the upgraded suit, The Hunter can use the accelerator to destroy the Parchment, and free Maximoff. Blaze contacts Reyes and gives him the Parchment, but also attempts to give the Hunter to Mephisto, trapping them in Limbo and preventing Lilith from reaching the Hunter. Nonetheless, Magik frees them so the heroes can enact their plan, banishing Sabretooth to Limbo along the way. Blaze sacrifices himself to destroy the Parchment via the accelerator and free Maximoff, but Banner uses the device to transform into a smarter, demonic Hulk.

The heroes track Hydra and Lilith to her tomb, where Reyes tries to seal her and the Hulk in a cave before they can restore the Darkhold, but she unleashes demons around the world. After defeating Crossbones and his forces, the heroes steal a dagger imbued with Chthon's power while Maximoff and the Hunter subdue and free Banner. The heroes confront Lilith, who reveals her plot to destroy Chthon upon learning of his plans for her child and destroys the Hunter's collar, learning too late that it kept Chthon from possessing them. Nonetheless, the Hunter expels him while Lilith uses the dagger to destroy the Darkhold, restoring her human form. Realizing she and her child were corrupted by the grimoire, Lilith sends the heroes back to the Abbey while she, the Hunter, and Chthon's realm are consumed by the Darkhold. Although the heroes mourn the Hunter's death, the Caretaker believes that they are still alive. Elsewhere, Doctor Doom witnesses the events that transpired and takes the Darkhold for himself, deeming the other users "amateurs".

=== Downloadable content ===
In The Good, the Bad, and the Undead, the Hunter investigates an art collection theft perpetrated by a Hydra battalion led by Sin. The Hunter encounters Deadpool, who was hired by Doom to recover a magic statue called the Magna Corrigo in the collection. After Sin betrays Hydra, steals the Magna Corrigo, and unleashes a group of infected "vampyres", the Hunter offers Deadpool sanctuary at the Abbey to protect him from Doom over the heroes' protests. With the Magna Corrigo in their possession, the emboldened vampyres publicly attack innocents and establish nests across Manhattan. With Deadpool's help, the Midnight Suns eventually track Sin to Transia, where she intends to use the Magna Corrigo in a ritual to empower the vampyres until Deadpool destroys it. Sin escapes and reports to Dracula, who assures her the Magna Corrigo was not vital to his plans.

In Redemption, Spider-Man and the Hunter locate Venom, who went underground and became infected by eating vampyres. Mephisto, seeking revenge on Dracula for breaking a deal between them, offers to cure Venom in exchange for the heroes killing Dracula's forces, which Spider-Man agrees to. Upon being cured, Venom calls for a truce and joins the Midnight Suns. Mephisto helps the Hunter, Venom, and Spider-Man find the vampyres' core nest and Dracula. Working together, the trio destroy the nest and force Dracula to retreat.

In The Hunger, the vampyres convert Hydra troopers and attack New York City. Spider-Man convinces Blade to help him recruit a mutual acquaintance of theirs, Michael Morbius. The heroes accompany Morbius to his lab, only to find the vampyres have stolen his research and a prototype "sunlight serum" capable of dampening his and the vampyres' photosensitivity. After the trio fend off vampyres who came to kill Morbius and destroy his remaining equipment, Spider-Man offers Morbius a sanctuary at the Abbey despite Blade's and the Hunter's reluctance. Spider-Man, after deducing that vampyres intend to mass-produce the sunlight serum, locates a Hydra facility sieged by a vampyre horde led by Sin. Spider-Man, Morbius, and the Hunter mobilize to stop them and recover the prototype serum, though they learn too late that Sin has already delivered several completed batches of sunlight serum to Dracula. Nonetheless, while fighting off Dracula and his empowered forces, the heroes discover the vampyres diluted Morbius' sample while mass-producing it, weakening its effects. Defeated, Dracula escapes to the sewers.

In Blood Storm, Magik and Wolverine are requested by their fellow X-Man, Storm, to assist her search for Dahlia, a mutant orphan who has gone missing. They locate Dahlia in New York's sewers, where she lives alongside the Morlocks, mutants with monstrous appearances who were rejected by society and refused to join the X-Men. Though initially resentful of the X-Men, Dahlia later opens up to Storm and accepts her offer to help. Some time later, Dahlia is kidnapped by Dracula, who wants to use her healing power to create a perfect vampyre race. Storm, the Hunter, and Blade confront and defeat Dracula and Sin, freeing Dahlia in the process. Afterwards, Dahlia accepts Storm's invitation to take refuge at Charles Xavier's school.

Following a lengthy investigation, Blade, Deadpool, Venom, Morbius, and Storm travel to Dracula's castle to kill him and end the vampyre threat. After successfully killing Dracula, the team escapes the collapsing castle and returns to the Abbey to celebrate. Meanwhile, an injured and disfigured Sin vows to find a new master.

== Development ==
=== Gameplay ===
Impressed by Firaxis Games' work on the XCOM series, Marvel Games approached Firaxis Games for the development of a Marvel video game following the release of XCOM 2: War of the Chosen in 2017. Jake Solomon, who directed the modern XCOM games, served as the game's creative director. The initial plan was to create a game centered on S.H.I.E.L.D. agents, though the team felt that players would be more interested in controlling superheroes directly. At the beginning, the team tried to translate major XCOM mechanics to the game. They used HeroClix figures of Marvel characters and began prototyping the game using a paper map. However, the team soon felt that core elements from XCOM, such as a cover system, permadeath, attack randomness and limited movement range, do not make thematic sense in a game about superheroes who should be powerful and heroic, and the studio decided to restart from scratch in favor of new systems and designs. To maintain a layer of unpredictability to tactical gameplay, the team first experimented with a "counter" system in which enemies will counter a hero attack and cut the player's turn short. However, this system was scrapped as it discouraged players from attacking enemies. The randomness aspect was instead achieved through the card-drawing mechanic, in which the suite of hero abilities players can select in each turn is randomized, but each ability is guaranteed to work. This is in direct contrast to XCOM in which players make a consistent gameplay decision only to deliver an unpredictable outcome.

Since the heroes are always powerful, the game foregoes a traditional progression system where they have to "train" their heroes. Players can deal devastating damage to enemies through careful planning of card plays and finding cards that synergize with each other. Solomon, who designed the skills for Magik and Iron Man, kept pushing his team to include overpowered moves for the superheroes, so that players felt that every skill is useful and effective. As a result, the game was largely uninterested in ensuring all characters builds are balanced, and the team had to abandoned some hallmark mechanics commonly found in tactical role-playing games. Card plays are shared among the whole team, so players were encouraged to use all of the characters' skills in combat as opposed to using a single, stronger character all the time. The ability of cards are further balanced by a secondary resource named "heroism", which adds additional complexity to the skill system. While a player may end up with a deck of cards that do not have enough heroism to play, redrawing cards would always guarantee a usable card requiring less heroism to use. The heroes often have stylistic attack animations for their powerful moves, inspired by anime with art director Dennis Moellers citing Dragon Ball FighterZ as a point of reference for the team. They were also inspired by the works of Marvel artists Jim Lee and Andy Kubert.

Combat in the game was designed to be "fast" and "approachable", ensured by the absence of a grid system, with characters moving to attack enemies automatically after a card is selected. However, positioning heroes remained a significant part of gameplay due to the introduction of environment hazards and the "knockback" mechanic from certain cards. Whereas XCOM was about surviving a difficult mission, Midnight Suns was about maximizing players' efficiency in dispatching enemies, with the team stressing that the enemies are the ones trapped in a combat arena with the superheroes. Solomon described Midnight Suns as a "more fun puzzle to solve", as it was "almost impossible to do something wrong" in the game. The developers designed the presentation of the heroes' abilities as cards to make strategic decisions more understandable for players, since most players are familiar with the basic rules of card games. Slay the Spire was cited by the team as a source of inspiration for the card-based battle system, though the system in the game is more simplistic, enabling for a lower number of tactical considerations in each turn. The team was initially hesitant to include deck-building card combat in the game, as they felt that it was not something common for a triple-A video game.

=== Story and characters ===
The team stressed the importance of superheroes' narrative outside of combat, fleshed out with friendship or rivalry. For the Abbey, the team was inspired by Mass Effect, Fire Emblem and Persona, as well as Japanese role-playing games and dating simulation games. This segment of the game and its third-person perspective were designed for players who are less familiar with strategy games. The Abbey was described by Solomon as a "social environment", and it was intended for players to build up their bonds with the playable heroes. The team tried to ensure that all the playable heroes have a "colourful personalities", so players would want to interact with them. An original character named the Hunter was chosen as the game's protagonist, so players could feel that they are being part of a "new" Marvel story instead of replaying an existing narrative. The Hunter was described by the game as "a blank slate" for players to project themselves into without having the baggage of existing expectations of a Marvel hero. Marvel worked with Firaxis on the appearance of the Hunter on the game's cover art, but did not restrict the inclusion of any customization features Firaxis had planned for them. DeAngelis compared the character creation system, and the concept of building up a party of characters, to games by BioWare and Bethesda Game Studios.

The story in the game was inspired by Rise of the Midnight Sons, Inferno and Spirits of Vengeance. The roster of characters assembles members of the supernatural team Midnight Sons, as well as popular Marvel characters. Initially, the team planned to have 25 playable characters, including Frank Drake and Hannibal King. Firaxis renamed the group to "Midnight Suns" to make them more inclusive. Solomon described the team, especially its founding members (Blade, Nico, Magik and Ghost Rider), as an outsider superhero group, heroes that were "cool" but "under-the-radar". The story explores the tension and rivalry between superhero groups, and sees heroes of vastly different backgrounds and experiences unite together to face a common threat. The game's antagonist, Lilith, is the mother of the Hunter. According to the team, Lilith felt that she was the hero of her own story, and the two characters shared a very "asymmetrical" relationship. While the Hunter vows to stop Lilith at all costs, Lilith made multiple attempts to persuade them to join her cause.

Unlike XCOM, which is system-led game with a focus on emergent storytelling, Midnight Suns had a fixed narrative with preconceived personalities. However, the game retained some opportunities for players to tell story through gameplay, such as having customizable cards and allowing players to choose their squad to enter combat. Through the story, Firaxis wanted players to be able to visit multiple iconic Marvel locations, such as the Sanctum Sanctorum, Stark Tower, the Quentin Carnival, and Transia. Solomon and his writing team were inspired by Saturday morning cartoons, and added that the characters in the game were "earnest" and took the conflict seriously, though there are frequently moments of levity and humor. Both X-Men: The Animated Series and Dungeons and Dragons influenced the team. According to the team, the game has around "65,000 lines of voiced dialogue" and "over two hours of cinematics". More than 30 conversations with characters were cut from the final game.

== Release ==
Midnight Suns was announced by Firaxis and publisher 2K during Gamescom in August 2021. It was given a scheduled release date of March 2022. The game was first delayed to October 7, 2022, and then delayed to December 2, 2022, for Windows, PlayStation 5, and Xbox Series X and Series S. A series of animated shorts serving as a prequel to the game were released in October 2022. At the Webby Awards (27th Annual ceremony), the game was nominated in the category Video – General Video: Trailer.

The game's Season Pass includes access to four downloadable content packs released during the year following the game's launch and the "Legendary Premium Pack", which introduced additional costumes for the playable heroes. The first DLC pack, titled The Good, The Bad, and The Undead, was released on January 26, 2023, and introduced Deadpool. The second pack, titled Redemption, added Venom as a playable character, and was released on February 16, 2023. The third pack, titled The Hunger, added Morbius, and was released on March 21, 2023. The last pack, titled Blood Storm, introduced Storm, and was released on May 11, 2023, the same day the game was released for PlayStation 4 and Xbox One. A Nintendo Switch version of the game was canceled.

== Reception ==
Reception

Aggregate score
Aggregator	Score
Metacritic	PC: 83/100; PS5: 81/100; XSXS: 81/100

Review scores
Publication	Score
Destructoid	7.5/10
Game Informer	8.5/10
GameSpot	8/10
GamesRadar+	4/5
IGN	8/10
PC Gamer (US)	88/100
The Guardian	4/5
VG247	4/5

Marvel's Midnight Suns received "generally favorable" reviews from critics, according to review aggregator website Metacritic. During the 26th Annual D.I.C.E. Awards, the Academy of Interactive Arts & Sciences nominated the game for "Strategy/Simulation Game of the Year".

Matt Miller from Game Informer praised the fast-paced gameplay, liked the attack animations, and praised the inclusion of environmental destructibility that adds a cinematic element to superhero fight. Jordan Ramée from GameSpot praised the deck-building system, which offered a layer of unpredictability to gameplay without being frustrating and allowed players to bring their plans to fruition through careful planning, as well as challenging player's ability to make improvised strategy decision. While several critics praised the game's varied mission design, Jon Bailes, writing for GamesRadar, was disappointed by the lack of enemy variety and mission objectives with "more substantial tactical shifts". Several critics disliked how the characters move automatically to their target.

Writing for IGN, Dan Stapleton felt that its combat system was innovative and "radically and refreshingly different" from XCOM. He also praised the game's progression system for providing more combat options in the late game, keeping the experience fresh despite the game's long campaign. Matthew Byrd from Den of Geek remarked that Midnight Suns was not as punishing as XCOM 2, though he felt that gameplay remained challenging throughout. Bailes described the third-person gameplay as a mix of XCOM 2 and Fire Emblem: Three Houses, though he felt like that battle preparations each morning could feel like a "checklist of chores". Jim Trinca from VG247 praised its clean user interface and remarked that Midnight Suns was "deftly engineered to make the player feel smart, or lucky, without really challenging them too much". Keith Stuart from The Guardian, however, praised Firaxis for not making the game's strategic element too simplistic to cater to general comic book fans. Chris Carter from Destructoid wrote that it was easy to recommend the game for Marvel fans and it was accessible enough for newcomers for the strategy game genre, though he felt that it was not Firaxis' best work.

Miller compared the game's relationship simulation to BioWare games. While he enjoyed the character development of each hero, he felt that interacting with them became repetitive and exhausting. Jeremy Peel from PC Gamer remarked that scenes from the Abbey were "frequently searching, and endearingly silly", and noted that its emphasis on developing friendships brought "warmth and approachability". Stapleton criticized the companion gameplay as "self-insertion fan fiction", noting that "so much of Midnight Suns is spent getting all of these heroes to really like Hunter". Ramée felt that the story was intriguing, adding that it had a lot of interesting character moments for the cast of heroes. Ramée also liked how conversations with characters often "culminate in heartwarming reveals or devastating discoveries", citing Magik and Nico as his personal favourites. Several critics also liked the story's exploration of complicated themes and sensitive subjects. While Bailes wrote that the Hunter was a "significant presence", and liked how players are often required to manage conflicts between disagreeing factions of characters in the Abbey, Bryd felt that he was the simultaneously the "center of the story" and "the least developed person" in it. Bryd added that the game was filled with "bad one-liners" and noted that its writing struggled to match other AAA video games. Kevin Nguyen from The Verge wrote that outside of combat, Midnight Suns was "a slog" filled with filler content, and remarked that Firaxis' writers were trying too hard to match the energy of the Marvel Cinematic Universe. Several critics expressed disappointment regarding the game's facial capture technology.

=== Sales ===
For the week ending 3 December 2022, Marvel's Midnight Suns ranked as the 26th best-selling physical game in the United Kingdom. In the United States and Canada, the title placed 14th among most-downloaded PlayStation 5 titles for December. On Steam, the game reached a peak concurrent player count of approximately 15,500 users.

Following the game’s release, Strauss Zelnick, chief executive officer of Take-Two Interactive, stated that although Marvel's Midnight Suns received positive critical reception, it did not meet the company’s commercial expectations. He suggested that the release window may have affected its performance and indicated that the title could achieve longer-term sales over time, similar to previous games developed by Firaxis Games. In retrospective commentary, director Jake Solomon believed that the inclusion of deck-building mechanics may have complicated the game’s market positioning and contributed to its commercial results. Writing for Game Developer, Bryant Francis noted that recent Marvel-licensed titles Marvel's Avengers and Marvel's Guardians of the Galaxy had also underperformed commercially, which he described as indicating limited market momentum for narrative-driven Marvel games at the time. Francis further suggested that Marvel's Midnight Suns occupied a hybrid niche that may not have aligned clearly with either mainstream Marvel audiences or established turn-based strategy players.
