= Long War (video game mod) =

2015 mod for XCOM: Enemy Unknown

- Developers: JohnnyLump; Amineri; XMarksTheSpot; Ellatan
- Release: Initial release; January 4, 2013; Latest release December 28, 2015
- Genre: Partial conversion mod

Long War is a fan-made partial conversion mod for the turn-based tactics video game XCOM: Enemy Unknown and its expansion, XCOM: Enemy Within. It was first released in early 2013, and it exited beta at the end of 2015. Almost every aspect of the original game is altered, creating a longer, more complex campaign that presents players with more strategic choices and customization options. Long War adds a significant number of new soldier classes, abilities, weapons, armors, and usable items, and also introduces new features, including soldier fatigue and improvements to alien units over the course of the game.

The mod was developed by Long War Studios, a team that came to include four core members, with assistance from 29 contributors, 20 voice actors, and three members of Firaxis Games, the developer of Enemy Unknown and Enemy Within. According to one of the mod's core developers, Amineri, the mod started as a series of changes to the base game's configuration file, and grew more expansive as the team's capabilities grew. By the end of the mod's development, the team was working directly with the Unreal Development Kit and had created a Java-based tool to help manage the changes that the mod was making.

Long War has received praise from both video game journalists and from the developers at Firaxis. It has been downloaded over 1,000,000 times, by almost 400,000 different users. Firaxis pointed to the popularity of Long War as a reason they added built-in support for modding into the sequel XCOM 2, and used Long War Studios to provide initial add-ons for the game at release. On 19 January 2017, the core team that released Long War, now going by the name Pavonis Interactive, released Long War 2 for XCOM 2, and has created their own independent game, Terra Invicta.

== Long War ==
=== Background and development ===
XCOM: Enemy Unknown is a turn-based tactics video game developed by Firaxis Games and released in October 2012. In XCOM: Enemy Unknown, the player assumes the role of the commander of a secret multinational military organization, XCOM, as it fights off an invasion by a numerically and technologically superior invading alien force. The player directs the organization's research and development, manages its finances, and controls its soldiers in combat. XCOM: Enemy Within is an expansion of Enemy Unknown, and was released in November 2013. Enemy Within added two additional ways for players to upgrade their soldiers - through genetic modification and through cybernetic combat suits called MECs - as well as new alien units and a new enemy faction, a secret paramilitary organization called EXALT.

Long War is a partial conversion mod for XCOM: Enemy Unknown and XCOM: Enemy Within. It was first uploaded to NexusMods on 4 January 2013, and exited beta with the release of version 1.0 on 28 December 2015. The developers announced in July 2015 with beta 15f2 that they had finished adding new features, and that any future releases would only correct bugs or balance issues. At the time that it exited beta, the mod's development was led by four core members, JohnnyLump (John J. Lumpkin), Amineri (Rachel Norman), XMarksTheSpot, and Ellatan (Alex Rozenfeld). They were joined by four senior contributors, 20 voice actors, and 29 contributors assisting with programming, art, sound engineering, translations, research, and porting the mod to Mac and Linux. Three members of Firaxis Games also provided assistance. (Note: The release dates for the first and last version can be found by clicking "Logs" in the "Actions" section.) The team released separate versions for Enemy Unknown and Enemy Within until the end of 2013, and thereafter only released versions for Enemy Within. (Note: The release date for the last version of the Enemy Unknown mod can be found under the "Old versions" heading in the "Files" tab.) Long War has been downloaded from NexusMods over 1,090,000 times by over 395,000 separate users.

First and foremost, the mod invites you to struggle through a longer, harsher campaign, but provides you with some new options to endure the prolonged alien assault.

— Christopher Livingston, covering the mod for PC Gamer

The aim of the Long War mod is, in the words of its developers, to create "much deeper strategic and tactical play and a greater variety of problems to throw at the player". The mod makes changes to many of the game's existing features, adds new concepts, and brings back concepts from the first game in the franchise, Julian Gollop's UFO: Enemy Unknown. As the mod's name implies, a campaign in Long War takes significantly longer than a campaign in the unmodified game, with Eurogamer's Chris Bratt estimating it at around 150 hours. However, the mod does have an option that significantly shortens the campaign.^{(at 3:20)}

According to Amineri, one of the mod's core developers, initial versions of Long War used changes to the game's configuration file to change content in the game. After other mod makers that were not part of the Long War project discovered how to make changes to the game by directly working with its Unreal Engine, more significant game alterations became possible, and the forums of NexusMods became a hub where such changes were exchanged. Many of the mod's key features, including the increased number of soldiers and the lengthened campaign, first appeared in version beta 1.9, which was released in mid 2013. Shortly after Enemy Within released, Amineri and XMarksTheSpot completed development of a Java-based tool called upkmodder that allowed the team to more effectively manage and implement the changes made by the mod. In the late stages of the mod's development, the team worked directly with the Unreal Development Kit.

=== Gameplay differences ===
Long War adds a large number of new weapons, suits of armor, and items. Every weapon and piece of equipment shown in this screenshot was added by the mod. Additionally, the soldier's class (Infantry) and many of the soldier's abilities are new content added by the mod.

Long War introduced several new concepts into the game. Soldiers that are sent on missions come back fatigued. If they are sent back out on another mission before resting off their fatigue, they return from the second mission with injuries. The combination of fatigue and much longer injury times requires players to maintain a larger number of soldiers.^{(at 2:10)} The mod also adds improvements over time for the enemy forces. Over the course of the game, both the aliens and the EXALT paramilitary group introduced in Enemy Within conduct their own research, granting their units new abilities. The player has the opportunity to slow down this research by defeating the aliens or EXALT when they launch missions, and conversely, the research happens faster when the player is unable to stop missions and when members of the council of nations that fund the player pull out of the council. It is difficult to halt their research completely, as the aliens capture a council nation early in the game and will occasionally launch missions with vastly superior forces that the player does not have a reasonable chance to defeat. The mod does add special missions that the player can launch to re-take council nations that have fallen under alien control.^{(at 3:45)}

In the original game, players can initially field four soldiers at a time, which can be upgraded to six soldiers later in the game. In the mod, players begin the game able to deploy six soldiers, which can be upgraded to eight, with certain missions allowing the player to bring as many as twelve soldiers. The number of classes that the soldiers can be is doubled from four to eight, with each original class being split into two in the mod. Each class has a corresponding class of cybernetic MEC soldier that they can be upgraded into. The mod also adds new classes of weapons including battle rifles, carbines, marksman rifles, and sub-machine guns. These choices affect soldiers' damage and movement compared to the assault rifle from the base game.^{(at 0:45)} New usable items and armor types are also added. The mod increases the number of soldier abilities and gives players three choices instead of two when selecting new abilities each time a soldier levels up. Additionally, some of the abilities that were only available to one class in the base game became available to other classes in the mod. The mod increases psionic abilities, and gives players access to psionics earlier than in the base game. Underpinning all of these changes is a larger technology tree. Research also takes longer and has a higher cost.^{(at 1:20)}

Each campaign in Long War also takes much longer than in the original game. This is because of the new tiers of research Long War adds which must be completed before the game's objectives can be completed. Also, the total amount of missions per month is much higher so the player will have to go on more missions, increasing the time it takes to beat the campaign.

=== Reception ===
The developers of the base game have been effusive in their praise for Long War. XCOM 2 lead producer Garth DeAngelis said "It's unbelievable what they did" and called it his "go-to recommendation" for hardcore fans. Jake Solomon, the lead designer of XCOM: Enemy Unknown and XCOM 2, and Ryan McFall, the lead engineer for XCOM 2, praised the technical skill of the team behind Long War in a panel discussion at Firaxion. Solomon, who recommended the mod in a tweet in 2014, also praised the mod for adding so much content and for answering a desire within the player community. He called the base game "basically a 20-hour tutorial for The Long War", which Chris Bratt of Eurogamer considered an exceptionally strong recommendation for the mod. (Note: The speaker in the video is identified in the article: Bratt, Chris (24 June 2015). "Video: It's not a bad time to check out XCOM Long War". Eurogamer.)^{(at 0:00)}

The mod has also been warmly received by video game journalists. Wired praised the amount of content added by the game and called it "the absolute best way to play XCOM". In a video explaining the mod, Eurogamer's Chris Bratt also praised the amount of new content, but was especially appreciative that the mod forced players to develop new strategies instead of relying on the tactics they used in the base game.^{(at 1:20)} Alec Meer of Rock, Paper, Shotgun complimented the mod for keeping the game fresh and capturing the feeling of surviving impossible odds, and gave the mod his strongest possible recommendation. The mod was profiled in PC Gamer's "Mod of the Week" feature in late 2014, and in a separate piece a year later, the publication praised how much the team behind the mod was able to accomplish considering that the base game was not built to support modding. Rock, Paper, Shotgun's Adam Smith, in an article announcing that the Long War team were in "pre-Kickstarter development" of their own game, called Long War "one of the best mods of all time".

As of January 2017, the mod has been downloaded from Nexus Mods over 844,000 times.

=== Legacy ===
In his article recommending the mod, Alec Meer of Rock, Paper, Shotgun speculated that the Long War mod influenced the development of XCOM 2. One area where Long War's influence was acknowledged was in the decision to support modding. The development team recognized that Enemy Unknown and Enemy Within were exceptionally difficult to mod, and aimed to make modding more accessible in the sequel. At a panel with XCOM 2 developers, Ryan McFall remarked that "we kind of watched in morbid fascination the Long War crew kind of hacking our game apart" before going on to provide a list of features and assets that would be available to people interested in modding XCOM 2. Jake Solomon pointed to the successes of Long War and mods to games in the Civilization franchise in explaining the decision to support modding.

== Long War 2 ==
=== Development ===
Around mid-2016, the team behind the Long War mod adopted the name "Long War Studios", and assisted Firaxis in providing some of the day-one add-ons for XCOM 2.

By January 2017, Long War Studios announced they have changed their name to Pavonis Interactive, and among other projects, are working with Firaxis to bring a new mod, Long War 2, in the same vein as the original Long War, to XCOM 2. The Long War 2 mod was released on January 19, 2017.

=== Gameplay differences ===
Long War 2 makes significant changes to the XCOM 2 game. The campaign becomes much longer, running for 100 to 120 missions on average. The mod increases the number of soldiers the commander can take on each mission, allowing for more rapid promotions, and adds a number of classes, some based on the add-ons previously developed by Pavonis. Several new mechanics are added to the game, including infiltration missions that require you to send out multiple squads at once, and managing resistance havens and their members. Two new weapon tiers, lasers and coilguns, as well as a number of new enemies, are also added. Finally, the mod overhauls the enemy's AI to create more responsive, challenging encounters.
