= XCOM 2: War of the Chosen =

2017 video game expansion pack

- Cover art featuring the Chosen (from left to right, Hunter, Assassin and Warlock)
- Developer: Firaxis Games
- Publisher: 2K
- Director: Jake Solomon (creative)
- Series: XCOM
- Engine: Unreal Engine 3.5
- Platforms: PlayStation 4; Windows; Xbox One; Linux; macOS; Nintendo Switch
- Release: PS4, Windows, Xbox One; August 29, 2017; Linux, macOS; August 31, 2017; Nintendo Switch; May 29, 2020
- Genre: Turn-based tactics
- Modes: Single-player, multiplayer

XCOM 2: War of the Chosen is an expansion pack for the 2016 turn-based tactics video game XCOM 2, released for PlayStation 4, Windows, and Xbox One on August 29, 2017. Versions for Linux and macOS were released on August 31, 2017, and a Nintendo Switch port was released on May 29, 2020.

== Gameplay ==
XCOM 2 is a turn-based tactics video game. A defensive guerrilla organization known as XCOM must resist and repel an alien occupation of a futuristic Earth. The War of the Chosen expansion makes changes to XCOM 2's campaign structure and adds new enemies, story elements, new hero characters, modifiers, and more options for apparence and behavior for characters.

The expansion introduces a new set of enemy aliens called the Chosen, three elite alien-human hybrid warriors tasked by the Elders to defeat XCOM and recapture the Commander: the Assassin, who relies on stealth and melee attacks; the Hunter, who uses a long range rifle which fires bullets that track their targets; and the Warlock, who uses psionic powers and can take control of several of the player's units at once. As the game progresses, the Chosen gain new exclusive abilities over time, and eventually become able to launch a direct attack on the Avenger. The Chosen continue to appear occasionally during missions even after being defeated, and can only be killed for good once their base is destroyed as well.

The game also introduces three rebel factions that antagonize each other, but grant the player access to special hero classes once their allegiance is earned; the Reapers, specialized in sniping and stealth, the Templars, who employ unique psionic abilities, and the Skirmishers, former ADVENT soldiers with exclusive equipment and tactics. Each faction also provides covert ops missions in which soldiers can be deployed to obtain extra resources, delay the Avatar project, or gather info about the Chosen's strongholds, as well as other benefits. Other new features include a revamped strategic layer and the "Bond" system, in which pairs of soldiers develop special abilities that are accessible when both are deployed during a mission, however, when a bonded soldier is killed, their partner may temporarily enter a "berserk mode", ignoring any of the player´s orders and attacking targets at random, or they may panic, becoming uncontrollable and fleeing from battle. While researching projects and equipment, breakthroughs and "inspirations" can randomly occur, to increase the speed researchers work at, or even instantly completing a research project.

The expansion also adds a neutrally-aligned zombie-like enemy type called the Lost, who were created from some humans during the alien invasion, that will form swarms and attack both ADVENT and XCOM in battle, along with new ADVENT units with exclusive abilities.

Other new features include a daily challenge mode, as well as the ability for the player to create posters featuring custom characters that will appear inside the game world.

Six of the voice actors new in the expansion are known for their roles on Star Trek: The Next Generation: Denise Crosby, John de Lancie, Jonathan Frakes, Michael Dorn, Dwight Schultz, and Marina Sirtis.

== Plot ==
The plot remains mostly unchanged from the original game except from a few cutscenes. One of them introduces three factions who also oppose the alien occupation: the Reapers, survivalists who have been hiding in the wilderness since the alien invasion; the Templars, surviving XCOM Psi Operatives who went into hiding; and the Skirmishers, former ADVENT soldiers who have rebelled against their masters. The Spokesman orders the commander to join forces with them to bolster the resistance's efforts. As the game progresses, XCOM is occasionally attacked by the Chosen, three elite alien warriors with orders from the Elders to recapture the Commander. Despite being killed in battle, each Chosen is revived and returns to attack on a later occasion. Should XCOM successfully locate and destroy a Chosen's stronghold, they are eliminated permanently.

The final mission also remains the same, except that each Chosen who was not killed permanently will appear to fight the Commander's avatar and his forces. After the Elders are defeated, a new cutscene after the original ending shows the three new resistance factions emerging from the shadows. One of them, the Templars, notice the glow coming from a rift in the sea and points out that a new conflict will soon begin.

== Release ==
War of the Chosen was announced at the Electronic Entertainment Expo 2017. It was released on August 29, 2017.

=== Tactical Legacy Pack ===
An add on for the game called "Tactical Legacy Pack" was released on October 9, 2018. It features a series of missions set between the events of XCOM: Enemy Unknown and XCOM 2, new items, new maps and the option to play the game using either the original XCOM: Enemy Unknown's soundtrack or an all-new soundtrack based on UFO: Enemy Unknown (known as X-Com: UFO Defense in North America), the first game of the original X-COM series.

== Reception ==
Reception

Aggregate score
Aggregator	Score
Metacritic	(PS4) 93/100 (PC) 88/100

Review scores
Publication	Score
Game Informer	9.25/10
IGN	8.8/10

XCOM 2: War of the Chosen received "generally favorable" reviews from professional critics according to review aggregator website Metacritic.

IGN's reviews editor Dan Stapleton praised the amount of variety War of the Chosen added to the mission objectives and campaign of XCOM 2. Although he found there to be some balance issues, he thought that both the Hero classes and the Chosen were great additions. Game Informer reviewer Ben Reeves was impressed by the amount of content included in the expansion, noting that it could almost have been a standalone game.

=== Accolades ===
Eurogamer ranked the game 46th on their list of the "Top 50 Games of 2017", while Polygon ranked it 17th on their list of the 50 best games of 2017. Readers and staff of Game Informer voted it for "Best Strategy Game". It also won the award for "Best Expansion" in PC Gamer's 2017 Game of the Year Awards; and was nominated for "Best Strategy Game" at The Game Awards 2017, and for "Strategy/Simulation Game of the Year" at the 21st Annual D.I.C.E. Awards. It won the award for "Game, Strategy" at the 17th Annual National Academy of Video Game Trade Reviewers Awards, whereas its other nomination was for "Game Engineering".
