= Bubble Safari =

2012 video game

- Developer: Zynga
- Platform: Browser
- Release: Facebook; May 9, 2012 Zynga.com; May 9, 2012 iOS; December 12, 2012
- Genres: Puzzle, social network game
- Modes: Single-player, multiplayer

Bubble Safari is a defunct tile-matching social network game by Zynga. The object is to help a monkey named Bubbles reconnect with his friends. Following its May 2012 release, Bubble Safari became the fastest-growing Facebook game, with 1.9 million active users for the week of July 9. PC Magazine ranked Bubble Safari as no. 5 on its Best Facebook Games list. Arcade game designer Mark Turmell, noted for such games as NBA Jam, received credit for Bubble Safari’s development. Bubble Safari is Zynga's first arcade game, the first Zynga game released on Zynga.com and Facebook simultaneously, and the first game from Zynga San Diego.

== History ==
Bubble Safari was announced and launched on May 9, 2012

Noted arcade game designer Mark Turmell, Zynga's senior creative director, was credited for the development of Bubble Safari. Turmell began designing arcade game machines over 20 years ago and was the lead programmer and designer of NBA Jam, a popular 1993 basketball arcade game.

By June 12, 2012, Bubble Safari had become the fastest-growing Facebook game with 14,800,000 monthly active users, growing by 10.6 million within the prior week. As of July 9, 2012, Bubble Safari had 30 million monthly active users. The game launched with 65 levels but by June 12, 2012, had grown to 77. The game, as of January 30, 2014 has 749 levels plus up to 80 additional un-numbered levels.

Bubble Safari is the first true arcade game Zynga developed; the first game from Zynga San Diego; and the first Zynga game to launch simultaneously on Zynga.com and Facebook.

PC Magazine ranked Bubble Safari no. 5 on its Best Facebook Games list in July 2012.

On December 12, 2012, Zynga announced the launch of Bubble Safari Ocean, a version of the game with an underwater twist for Facebook in 13 languages, and a mobile version of Bubble Safari for iOS.

Bubble Safari has been indefinitely closed as of September 30, 2015, as Zynga announced in a message on Bubble Safari's Facebook page on August 10, 2015.

== Gameplay ==
Bubble Safari’s storyline focuses on Bubbles, a monkey trying to reconnect with his friends, who have been captured by poachers. Bubbles sets off into the jungle to find the poachers. Players pop bubbles to supply Bubbles fruit for his journey.

The bubble-popping gameplay is in the tradition of Puzzle Bobble and Bubble Bobble. Players aim and fire colored bubbles into a field at the top of the screen; matching three bubbles pops them. Every level-up gets Bubbles closer to finding the poachers against obstacles such as swarming bees and bubble spawners.

Though playing costs energy, gamers can keep earning energy back as long as they clear levels, enabling users to play longer than in some other games.

Players can also tap into their social network and ask friends for extra plays and share bubbles. Friends who give gamers extra bubbles also get a boost themselves. Bubbles can be shared with Facebook friends who are playing the game, and players can participate in a weekly tournament with friends and family.

Bubble Safari on Facebook allows gamers to play in timed challenges, while the game on Zynga.com also allows multi-player challenges in real time.

== Currency ==
Bubble Safari uses two virtual currencies. Cash is earned through normal play or can be purchased with real currency. The premium currency can be used to buy super power-ups. Gamers can spend standard coins to continue playing after a fail at any stage, to avoid having to start over from the beginning.

== Partnerships ==
Zynga partnered with the Wildlife Conservation Society (WCS) to give Bubble Safari users the opportunity to donate money to protect wildlife. Users purchase a WCS game bundle, with 100 percent of the purchase price going to WCS.
