= Jake Solomon =

Game designer

- Education: University of Oklahoma
- Occupation: Game designer
- Notable work: XCOM series

Jacob Solomon, better known as Jake Solomon, is an American game designer. A long-time employee of Maryland-based Firaxis Games who applied due to his interest in the XCOM series of turn-based strategy games, he is best known for his work on the design of XCOM: Enemy Unknown, a reboot of the series, and its sequel, XCOM 2. In 2023, he left Firaxis to become an indie developer for Midsummer Studios, working on Burbank, a life simulation game.

== Early life ==
After graduating from high school, Solomon began studying for medical school at the behest of his parents. However, in 1995, he switched his major at the University of Oklahoma from pre-med to computer science, influenced by the numerous games being released that year. Four years later, Solomon, a heavy fan of XCOM with the desire to make a similar game, applied to Firaxis and was hired by the studio.

== Career ==
Solomon described being hired by Firaxis as "complete luck", though he was noted for his design talent and creativity while at the company, causing him to rise quickly through the ranks. He positioned himself as a "fixer" helping to solve complicated problems. Considering it a dream job, he began asking to create an XCOM game. In 2003, he was given the opportunity to create a prototype for a new version of XCOM. After working with a small team for six months, Solomon revealed an "awful" prototype that he stated ironically nearly "killed" the franchise. Also describing the game as "un-fun", it resulted in Firaxis shutting down the project almost immediately.

Another four years afterwards in 2007, Solomon got a second chance at designing an XCOM reboot, one which was also considered a failure. He and the rest of his team finished the game's "vertical slice" on August 23, 2009, celebrating the achievement with a party. However, they soon realized the prototype, which heavily resembled the original games, had limited appeal to all but a small group of hardcore fans, and was overly complex, with Solomon saying that the revelation caused him to grow up as a designer.

By this time, Solomon had developed a close bond with Sid Meier. He was advised by Meier to listen to the feedback and take it to heart, overriding his own ideas. Solomon decided to discard the vertical slice entirely and start from scratch on what would eventually become Enemy Unknown. He worked closely with Meier to refine the gameplay while it was in development. The game ultimately released in 2012 to widespread critical acclaim, albeit leaving Solomon emotionally spent from 5 years of stressful work.

As the years went on, Solomon became more and more interested in simulating interpersonal relationships in video games rather than just combat, resulting in the soldier bond system of XCOM 2 and the friendship system of Marvel's Midnight Suns, a game he described as a "hero dating simulator". He eventually soured on combat entirely and decided to leave Firaxis in 2023 to pursue designing new types of games. Becoming the creative director of Midsummer Studios in 2023, he planned on creating a life sim game similar to The Sims, but focused on creating their own small-town drama. However, the studio announced its closure in February 2026.

== Works ==
- Civilization III (2001) (programmer)
- Sid Meier's SimGolf (2002) (programmer)
- Sid Meier's Pirates! (2004) (programmer)
- Civilization Revolution (2008) (programmer, additional design)
- XCOM: Enemy Unknown (2012) (designer)
- XCOM 2 (2016) (creative director)
- XCOM 2: War of the Chosen (2017) (creative director)
- Marvel's Midnight Suns (2022) (creative director)
