= XCOM: Enemy Within =

2013 expansion pack

- North American cover art of XCOM: Enemy Within Commander Edition
- Developer: Firaxis Games
- Publishers: 2K Games; Feral Interactive (OS X, Linux)
- Producers: Clint McCaul; Garth DeAngelis
- Designer: Ananda Gupta
- Programmer: Justin Boswell
- Artist: David Black
- Writers: Scott Wittbecker; Liam Collins
- Composer: Michael McCann
- Series: XCOM
- Engine: Unreal Engine 3
- Platforms: Microsoft Windows, Linux, OS X, iOS, Android, PlayStation Vita, PlayStation 3, Xbox 360
- Release: Windows, OS X, PlayStation 3, Xbox 360; NA: November 12, 2013; EU: November 15, 2013; AU: November 15, 2013; Linux, SteamOS; WW: June 19, 2014; Android, iOS; WW: November 13, 2014; PlayStation Vita; NA: March 22, 2016; EU: March 21, 2016; AU: March 21, 2016
- Genre: Turn-based tactics
- Modes: Single-player, multiplayer

XCOM: Enemy Within is an expansion pack for the turn-based tactical video game XCOM: Enemy Unknown. The expansion pack primarily adds new gameplay elements to the base game, as well as introducing new themes of transhumanism via aggressive gene therapy.

XCOM: Enemy Within was released for Microsoft Windows, PlayStation 3, and Xbox 360 in November 2013 and received generally favorable reviews from critics. In June 2014, Feral released both XCOM: Enemy Within and its base game XCOM: Enemy Unknown for Linux. The game also came to the iOS App Store and Google Play Store a year after the initial release, on November 12, 2014. On March 22, 2016, the game was released on the PlayStation Store for PlayStation Vita.

The Windows, OS X and Linux editions require XCOM: Enemy Unknown to play; Enemy Within was released for Xbox 360 and PlayStation 3 as part of the Commander Edition bundle with Enemy Unknown. The iOS and Android versions were released as stand-alone apps not requiring the original mobile port of Enemy Unknown to play. The PlayStation Vita version is only available bundled with Enemy Unknown under the title, XCOM: Enemy Unknown Plus.

== Gameplay ==
The gameplay and plot of XCOM: Enemy Within largely remains the same as XCOM: Enemy Unknown with some additional features. The player manages the XCOM headquarters in almost real time progress, but much of the gameplay consists of turn-based battles against the invading aliens and some with the rogue human faction EXALT across the globe. Similar to the numerous expansions of the Civilization series, the pack retains the core storyline but adds a broad variety of content.

=== New features ===
- A new resource, called "Meld", is introduced. XCOM operatives will be forced to advance swiftly in order to secure Meld canisters with delay-activated self-destruct systems; some of the aliens' more sophisticated cybernetic units such as Mechtoids also grant Meld when killed. Meld is a suspension made up of billions of cybernetic nanomachines. These nanites are each made up of organic and mechanical components. It is required for some of the newly introduced XCOM transhuman technologies.
- Alien robotic units have gained an increase in effectiveness, as well as introduction of two new units:
  - The Seeker is an airborne squid-like machine with a cloaking device armed with plasma blast as primary weapon. The cloaking ability doesn't last indefinitely and will run out. If it gets close to a lone XCOM operative while cloaked, it can use its Strangle ability. It usually appears in a pair and will cloak when discovered. Their AI will avoid direct confrontation with XCOM operatives, preferring to cloak until the soldiers engage another group of aliens. At that point the Seeker strikes - sneaking up on an lone unsuspecting human and activating the strangle ability on the target, which deals increasing amounts of damage until a soldier can shoot it off the targeted squadmate.
  - The Mechtoid is a Sectoid fitted into a large, heavily armed suit of powered armor armed with two plasma mini cannons. The Mechtoid can shoot twice in a single round on a single target. Sectoids can Mind Merge with the Mechtoid, providing the Mechtoid with additional psionic shielded health. Killing the Sectoid in this state does not kill the Mechtoid as it does when two Sectoids merge, but merely removes the shielded health.
- Alien autopsies and Meld allow XCOM scientists to modify operatives of existing classes to give them superhuman abilities, e.g. to leap several stories, to sense nearby enemies, or a backup heart.
- Alternatively, they can be modified into the brand-new class "MEC Trooper", which is capable of wearing Mechanized Exoskeleton Cybersuits into battle; however, they are rendered unable to participate in combat without a MEC, as the cybernetic modification includes amputation of all four limbs. MECs are large bipedal combat platforms with a cyborg pilot in their upper torso; while staggeringly expensive to deploy and upgrade and unable to take cover behind objects, they are more robust, better-armed and more mobile than conventional operatives. Additionally, XCOM's more basic S.H.I.V. a.k.a. Super Heavy Infantry Vehicle combat robots receive upgrades as well.
- EXALT, a new enemy faction in the form of a covert fifth column paramilitary human organization is introduced. EXALT seek to embrace the aliens' technologies and outlast their invasion in order to rule the world afterwards. They undermine XCOM's war effort with a variety of underhanded tactics through the covert cells located across the globe by stealing funds, creating more panic in Council nations and delaying research on important technology. The player is actually not obligated to actively engage them, and they will not seek open combat either; to root out their cells around the world, the player would have to perform Intel Scans and send soldiers on Covert Missions. EXALT's main base is located in one of the countries of the Council and with each successful covert operation, hints are given about which country it is, and the player has the option of launching an assault to take it down for good. However, performing a raid in the wrong country will cause it to withdraw from the Council. When forced to fight XCOM head-on, EXALT deploys "men in black"-style operatives that mirror those of XCOM troops with the same combat roles, squad tactics and equipment.
- Enemy Within re-introduces the Base Defense mission. Without forewarning or a chance for the player to select and arm a squad, XCOM headquarters fall victim to a number of acts of sabotage caused by multiple instances of mind-controlled personnel, followed by an alien assault. Failure of this mission leads to immediate defeat.
- Operation Progeny, originally scheduled to be released as a separate DLC, is included. It allows EXALT to make an inferred early appearance and includes three missions over the course of which XCOM recovers four talented psionics from alien captivity, including the one responsible for the base attack.
- Site Recon further details the effects of the alien invasion on Earth's ecosystem. XCOM operatives investigate a fishing village in Newfoundland, discovering a Chryssalid infestation using a whale as an incubation chamber.
- Thanks to collating localization voice files, XCOM soldiers can now be customized to speak in one of several languages.
- 47 new maps have been added for the single player game, adding to the existing 80 maps bringing the total to well over 120 maps. Eight new multiplayer maps have also been added to the existing five, bringing the total to 13 multiplayer maps.

== Development and release ==
XCOM: Enemy Within was originally announced with a scheduled release date of November 15, 2013. XCOM: Enemy Within was released in stores on November 12, 2013 in the US, and November 15, 2013 internationally. The game was released for digital distribution via Steam on November 11, 2013.

== Mods ==
Long War is a partial conversion mod originally developed for XCOM: Enemy Unknown. After the release of Enemy Within, development of the mod switched to Enemy Within. The mod makes changes to many of the game's existing features, adds entirely new features, and brings back concepts from UFO: Enemy Unknown.

Changes include the ability to send a larger number of soldiers into battle, additional soldier classes, psionic abilities, weapons, and items, and an expanded technology tree. In the mod aliens and EXALT conduct their own research and get stronger over the course of the game, a process that speeds up or slows down based on the player's success in stopping missions launched by the hostile forces.

The mod was heavily praised by Enemy Unknown lead designer Jake Solomon and producer Garth DeAngelis, with DeAngelis calling it his "go-to recommendation" for hardcore fans.

== Reception ==
Reception

Aggregate score
Aggregator	Score
Metacritic	PC: 86/100; PS3: 88/100; X360: 88/100 iOS: 92/100

Review scores
Publication	Score
Destructoid	9/10
Eurogamer	9/10
Game Informer	9.25/10
GameSpot	8/10
GamesRadar+	4.5/5
IGN	9/10
TouchArcade	5/5
VideoGamer.com	9/10

XCOM: Enemy Within received generally favorable reviews from critics. Ben Reeves of Game Informer lauded the game, advising that "anyone who loves an intense firefight should test their mettle on Enemy Within," although also noting that "Despite Firaxis' improvements, the developer wasn't able to fix the line-of-sight issues" of the main game and that "acquiring new squad members still feels unbalanced; since you can't assign your soldiers' roles, and they only learn their specialty once they've ranked up, it's easy to end up with holes in your squad".

Eurogamer's Stace Harman echoed similar statements, stating that despite its flaws, "Enemy Within is an improvement on an already excellent game," Destructoid's Chris Carter proffered similar praise, headlining his review with "It almost feels like a sequel." Regarding all the new content, he thought that it was "a really weird way" to approach an expansion due to its blending of old and new content, but summarized his review by saying, "If you haven't played the newest XCOM yet, now is a perfect time to do so with the Enemy Within package." Matt Lees of VideoGamer.com similarly summarized his review with, "The best game of 2012 is back, and it might be the best game of 2013."

IGN's Dan Stapleton criticized the late-game, stating that all the new content and unlockables make the later half of the game too easy; however, Stapleton still ultimately awarded the game a 9/10, calling it "an amazing expansion to a brilliant tactical game", and that it "is best enjoyed in Iron Man mode on Classic difficulty to enhance the emotional highs and lows of victory and permanent defeat."

Conversely, GamesRadar's Ryan Taljonick argued that "Enemy Within's new additions don't make the experience any easier [because] the added benefit of having access to gene mods and MEC Troopers is offset by new alien types and a whole new faction of fanatical humans. If anything, saving the world is harder than ever." Although GameSpot's Leif Johnson applauded the game, he was critical of the expansion pack's pricing disparity between PC and consoles: "All of [its content] is certainly enough for PC players to fork out the $20 for the upgrade, but unfortunately, console players face the more daunting task of buying Firaxis' new creation for almost the price of a new game."

During the 17th Annual D.I.C.E. Awards, the Academy of Interactive Arts & Sciences awarded XCOM: Enemy Within with "Strategy/Simulation Game of the Year".
