= XCOM 2 =

2016 video game

- Developer: Firaxis Games (Note: Switch version jointly developed by Firaxis Games and Virtuos. PlayStation 4 and Xbox One versions developed by Blind Squirrel Games.)
- Publisher: 2K
- Director: Jake Solomon
- Producer: Garth DeAngelis
- Designers: Brian Hess; Mark Nauta; Joseph Weinhoffer
- Programmer: Ryan McFall
- Artist: Gregory Foertsch
- Writer: Scott Wittbecker
- Composer: Tim Wynn
- Series: XCOM
- Engine: Unreal Engine 3.5
- Platforms: Linux; OS X; Windows; PlayStation 4; Xbox One; Nintendo Switch; iOS; Android
- Release: February 5, 2016: Linux, OS X, Windows; WW: February 5, 2016 PlayStation 4, Xbox One; NA: September 27, 2016; WW: September 30, 2016 Nintendo Switch; WW: May 29, 2020 iOS; WW: November 5, 2020 Android; WW: July 13, 2021
- Genre: Turn-based tactics
- Modes: Single-player, multiplayer

XCOM 2 is a 2016 turn-based tactics video game developed by Firaxis Games and published by 2K. It is the sequel to 2012's reboot of the series, XCOM: Enemy Unknown; it takes place 20 years after the events of Enemy Unknown. XCOM, a military organization trying to fight off an alien invasion, has lost the war and is now a resistance force against the occupation of Earth and the established totalitarian regime and military dictatorship. Gameplay is split between turn-based combat in which players command a squad of soldiers to fight enemies, and strategy elements in which players manage and control the operations of the Avenger, an alien ship that is used as a mobile base for XCOM.

Following players' feedback on Enemy Unknown, Firaxis added procedural generation of maps and mod support to the game. The developers set the game after the bad ending of the 2012 reboot because it allowed them to change gameplay, introduce various new features and redesign some enemies. To encourage players to play more offensively, the developers introduced time-based objectives to boost the game's pacing. Compared with its predecessor, XCOM 2 has more emphasis on narrative. The artists drew inspiration from sci-fi movies including Elysium and Oblivion when creating the game's aesthetic. The game is powered by Unreal Engine 3.5.

XCOM 2 was released in February 2016 for personal computers; PlayStation 4 and Xbox One versions were released in September 2016. Upon release, the game received critical acclaim. Critics praised the new concealment system, which they said adds a new layer of depth, and the procedural generation of maps. The game was also praised for its difficulty and the addition of modding tools; criticism was mainly directed at its poor performance at launch. It was nominated for multiple year-end accolades by several gaming publications. Firaxis supported the game with downloadable content and released XCOM 2: War of the Chosen, the game's expansion, in 2017. It was released for Nintendo Switch and iOS in 2020, and Android in 2021.

== Gameplay ==
=== Turn-based combat ===
A member of the player's squad is hiding behind low cover as indicated by the blue half shield icon.

In XCOM 2, the player-character is the commander of the XCOM military organization that is now reduced to a resistance force opposing the ongoing alien occupation of Earth. Played from a top-down perspective, the game uses turn-based tactics in which players issue commands to a squad of human soldiers to eliminate the aliens in a map and dependent on missions, complete secondary objectives. Many of the missions are timed, requiring players to complete it within several turns. Maps are procedurally generated to create a wide variety of levels. Every map features different terrain and buildings in each playthrough. The game offers four difficulty settings: Rookie, Veteran, Commander and Legend.

After players complete the campaign, they can start a new game with the "Ironman" mode enabled. In this mode, the player's save file is overwritten whenever the player performs an action, making it impossible for players to revert to an earlier save after making a poor decision. Players can create campaigns, cosmetics and enemy types, which can be shared through Steam Workshop. The game features a one-on-one multiplayer mode in which the player chooses the side of either XCOM or ADVENT, receives a pool of points with which the player can build the composition of their force (similar to a tabletop wargame), and then attempt to eliminate the opponent's squad on a battlefield.

At the start of most missions, the player's squad is concealed and will not be detected by enemies unless they attack or move too close to an enemy unit. This allows players to ambush enemies, which provides combat bonuses. Fog of war hides the aliens and their actions from view until the player's soldiers are in range and have line of sight on them. Squad members can take cover behind objects which reduces the chance of being hit. Enemies will attempt to flank targets and exposed soldiers are highly likely to get hit and suffer critical damage. Each squad member can perform a limited number of actions before the enemy takes their turn. Players can also choose to end their turn early. Soldiers can be instructed to move, attack or both depending on their available action points. The game will inform the players of the possibility of landing a successful shot and the amount of health the enemy will lose. They can reload, remain in overwatch to shoot any moving enemy in their line of sight, hunker down, and hack into enemies' mechanical weapons such as turrets and temporarily shut them down or take control of them.

The game has five character classes, each with its own unique abilities and equipment: the Ranger can make melee attacks in addition to shooting, the Grenadier carries a grenade launcher and explosives that can destroy enemy cover, the Specialist acts as a combat medic and uses a drone that improves the team's defense and can hack robotic enemies and electronic devices. The Sharpshooter is the team's sniper, and the Psi Operative—which is unlocked late in the game—uses a selection of telepathic and psionic powers in combat. Enemies from the first game in the series, including the Sectoids, returned while Firaxis introduced new enemies including the Vipers, a snake-like enemy who can drag soldiers out of their cover or constrict them, inflicting damage over time. When a soldier is injured or about to bleed out, medkits can be used to stabilize his or her condition. Soldiers in the squad can be permanently killed by enemies. If it is deemed necessary to abandon the mission, a soldier can carry wounded soldiers to extraction where they are revived upon leaving the map. The bodies of killed soldiers in the squad can also be carried back to extract their equipment. If the soldiers survive and complete the mission, they gain experience and will be promoted, unlocking new options in the skill trees and customization items.

=== Strategy and management ===
Players take control of the Avenger, an alien ship that is the new mobile base for XCOM, commanding the engineering and research departments of the base between missions. Players can assign the research department to perform autopsies on alien corpses and study the technology found during missions, which unlock new gadgets, weapons and technologies to assist soldiers in battle. The engineering department can be instructed to craft new ammo types, armors, and weapons. The Armory allows players to recruit soldiers and customize their personalities, names, costumes, genders, nationalities, and weapons. Wounded soldiers will slowly convalesce at the base. As the game progresses, new facilities that allow players to increase squad size, improve combat performance, and craft experimental weapons are unlocked. Players also need to build Resistance Comms to establish contact with resistance cells worldwide, allowing players to expand to new territories and maintain their influence. Facilities must be staffed with engineers to ensure they are fully functional. These facilities can be upgraded.

At the bridge of the Avenger, players can access the Geoscape, advance time, move the Avenger, access scanning missions and combat missions, visit the Resistance HQ to purchase new engineers, weapons, and soldiers, trade with the black market, and discover supply caches and bonus equipment. The construction of facilities requires supplies that can be collected through the excavation of alien debris in the ship by the engineers. Intelligence is gathered through contact with resistance cells, which can then be used in trade. Other resources, such as Elerium, are materials needed for crafting new gadgets. While the player is managing the mobile base, the aliens also start up a research initiative known as the Avatar Program. It proceeds slowly and if completed is an automatic loss. Progress can be delayed by sabotaging alien research facilities and other semi-random events.

== Story ==
XCOM 2 is set in 2035, 20 years after the events of XCOM: Enemy Unknown and XCOM: Enemy Within, its expansion pack. XCOM proved incapable of resisting the alien threat and was betrayed by the council nations, who surrendered to the aliens shortly after the invasion began. Most of the XCOM members also submitted to alien rule but some, like Central Officer Bradford, refused the alien administration and went underground to operate as a resistance force. Earth is controlled by the aliens through the puppet ADVENT Administration. ADVENT has done much to improve public opinion of the aliens, especially by the propagation of the belief the aliens came in peace and that the forces of Earth retaliated aggressively and with prejudice.

The player assumes the role of the Commander, who had been placed in alien stasis so they could make use of their strategic thinking via a brain implant. After the Commander is rescued by Central Officer Bradford, XCOM launches an attack on an alien convoy and steals an elerium core used to power the Avenger, an alien supply barge that has been converted into XCOM's mobile base. On the Avenger, the Commander has the support of Dr. Richard Tygan, a rogue ADVENT scientist who replaces the missing Dr. Moira Vahlen as Chief Researcher, and Lily Shen, who assumes her late father Dr. Raymond Shen's position as Chief Engineer.

=== Plot ===
The game begins with Bradford leading a raid on an ADVENT building to rescue the Commander, who had been captured and put into stasis. The Commander is brought to XCOM's mobile headquarters, where they meet scientist Dr. Richard Tygan and engineer Lily Shen. Tygan tells the Commander that while they were in stasis, ADVENT used their brain to gain tactical data and facilitate the conquering of Earth. The Commander is contacted by the Spokesman, the last loyal member of the pre-conquest XCOM Council, now a mole inside ADVENT. The Spokesman orders the Commander to unite the resistance groups around the world and to discover the true nature of ADVENT's top-secret Avatar Project.

The Commander leads XCOM to raid secret ADVENT facilities and discover clues about the Project. Dr. Tygan discovers that ADVENT's leaders, known as the Elders, have been dying from irreversible physical degeneration of their bodies. The Avatar Project is an attempt to escape this demise; it involves processing kidnapped humans into raw biological material, with which new bodies (literal avatars) are built for the Elders. With their hand forced, ADVENT decides to accelerate the project and process all "non-essential" humans into the Avatar project under the guise of curing all disease at their clinics. The Spokesman is presumed killed when he sacrifices himself to warn XCOM about the plan, ordering them to hijack ADVENT's global communication network before they can make the announcement. XCOM hacks the network and transmits proof of ADVENT's crimes to the world, causing a global revolution against the alien occupation.

With ADVENT busy trying to maintain order, the Commander takes psionic control of an uninhabited avatar stolen from one of ADVENT's facilities and raids the Elders' underwater headquarters. The Elders plead with the Commander to stop the fighting and rejoin them, claiming they are only trying to strengthen themselves and humanity against a greater threat. The Commander ignores the Elders' pleas and destroys all of their Avatars, triggering the destruction of the base. The Commander's Avatar stays behind to battle the enraged spirits of the Elders as the other XCOM soldiers escape.

Afterwards, the Commander wakes up in their own body and learns that without the direction of the Elders, ADVENT's grip on humanity has crumbled. People abandon ADVENT's cities to join the Resistance en masse, and the military remnants are ineffective without their leadership. In the ocean underneath the ruins of the Elder headquarters, a strange energy begins to glow.

==== Alien Hunters ====
After discovering an emergency locator beacon using an old XCOM frequency, Bradford suggests they investigate. The source is revealed to be XCOM's original Skyranger, "Big Sky", finding dead soldiers and a crate full of weapons, but no pilot. The weapons are unique and can not be replicated, making their loss in battle permanent if left behind.

After triangulating the Skyranger's origin point, they pick up a weak transmission being transmitted by Doctor Moira Vahlen, XCOM's chief scientist who went missing after XCOM lost their headquarters. Once they arrive at origin point, Bradford insists on investigating personally.

Once on-site, they discover a dead scientist carrying Vahlen's data-logs, totems made of human bones and underdeveloped Vipers. Vahlens's logs reveal that she stumbled upon an abandoned Alien genetics lab built into a cave that contained a stasis pod with three embryos, one for a Viper, a Berserker and an Archon. While surviving a Viper ambush in Vahlen's field lab inside the cave, they discover the message is actually a warning to not approach the cave. After removing genetic blockers implemented by the Elders, the fully grown subjects broke containment, with two escaping into the wild while the third, Subject Gamma, the Viper King, the first male Viper seen to date, converts the breached containment unit into a den with the help of a mate.

After killing or forcing the Viper King to retreat through a psionic rift and clearing out the rest of the Vipers, they discover Vahlen was not among the dead. Once XCOM hunts down the Alien Rulers, Subject Beta, the Beserker Queen, and Subject Alpha, the Archon King, they turn the corpses into special armor.

==== Shen's Last Gift ====
After an unknown entity hacks ROV-R, Lily Shen's personal GREMLIN, which then accesses the Avenger's systems. Lily believes this may have a connection to her deceased father, Raymond Shen, XCOM's chief engineer, who died while securing the Avenger from the Aliens. After tracing the signal to an abandoned ADVENT Tower, which is unusual since ADVENT seldom abandons assets, especially such a massive tower, XCOM decides to investigate, with Lily insisting on joining the squad to investigate the tower.

They discover the tower is a MEC factory, controlled by an AI called Julian. Julian was an attempt by Raymond Shen to upgrade the base AI to something more like human consciousness, he was seized by ADVENT from the XCOM base after their defeat during the first invasion. After first helping ADVENT design their robotic forces, he revolted, killing the tower personnel before ADVENT severed the tower from their network, isolating it from the world.

While fending off Julian's forces, they discover the SPARK, which was used by ADVENT as the basis for their own MECs. Once Lily activates the SPARK, it displays a message from Raymond to his daughter, saying he created the SPARK to protect her, and that she, not Julian, is his greatest gift to the world.

Enraged, Julian, wanting to use the SPARK as a body to escape his prison, tries to kill the team with poisonous gas, then, once they reach the top of the tower, a Sectopod he uploads himself to. Once they destroy the Sectopod, the tower's defenses shutdown, allowing the away team to evacuate. Lily then uses the SPARK as the basis for XCOM's own MECs. While Julian was destroyed with the Sectopod, he left an imprint of his core memory on ROV-R when he first hacked it. Once he has been programmed to be unable to betray XCOM, he can be uploaded to a MEC.

== Development ==
Firaxis Games, the developer of XCOM: Enemy Unknown, and its creative director Jake Solomon returned to work on XCOM 2. The game's development time was shorter than that of Enemy Unknown. The developers inspected players' feedback from the 2012 reboot. As Enemy Unknown was considered to be a reboot for the series and was often compared to the original games in the 1990s, Solomon described XCOM 2's development as a more liberating experience than making the previous game because the team had amassed an audience already. Nonetheless, the developers drew on elements from the original games, including procedural generation and gameplay unpredictability, to XCOM 2.

According to Jake Solomon, the game's creative process is "gameplay driven". As a result, the setting was introduced after Firaxis changed the character classes and added stealth elements to the game. The team found the new setting is thematically suitable for the squad-based gameplay and that it enabled them to create new alien designs and reset the research options. Compared to Enemy Unknown, the writers spent more time writing the game's backstory. Because the game is set in the future, more backstory was written to ensure players felt attached to the game's narrative. Environment storytelling is an important part of the game; for instance, in the megacity there are signs indicating ADVENT has taken over the world whereas other maps and areas show players the remnants of human civilizations. Solomon said the team intentionally went with the guerilla theme, as they felt that it is the "opposite direction" of Enemy Unknown's formula. Instead of witnessing XCOM slowly falling apart in Enemy Unknown, players in XCOM 2 is tasked to rebuild the alliance as they progress in the campaign.

The gameplay was initially designed to be forgiving but after receiving feedback from play-testers, who noted the game was too simple and that a lot of systems failed to engage players, the idea was scrapped during the late stage of development. The team attempted to maintain the game's difficulty so players who played Enemy Unknown would still face a challenge. According to DeAngelis, the developers wanted the game to be "brutally challenging" so when the player overcame these challenges, "the sense of triumph [will be] truly powerful". To ensure the game is challenging and replayable, the team valued the idea of unpredictability and randomness. For instance, when players attempt to shoot an enemy, the game's user interface tells players the chance of launching a successful hit. At a high percentage of chance, they can still miss their shots while at a low percentage, players may be able to land some hits. According to Solomon, the team realized players may become emotionally invested in the experience, thus the real statistic calculation will "match the player's psychological feeling about that number", meaning the possibility of successful hits may be slightly higher or lower than the UI statistic.

Despite the game's difficulty, the team wanted to encourage players to play more offensively. Therefore, the team added valuable loot drops, time-sensitive objectives, and the idea of "concealment", in which recruits can ambush the aliens, forcing players to take more risks during gameplay. Players can achieve variability through the strategic gameplay of the Avengers, in which players need to determine when and where to move the mobile headquarters, what to research and what areas to liberate first. The strategic aspects of the game encouraged players to consider the consequences of performing actions. For instance, completing a side-mission that nets players additional resources may mean the aliens may have made further progress with their Avatar Program. According to Solomon, this also made the alien more "active" in the strategy layer of the game.

The concept of procedurally-generated levels in Enemy Unknown was scrapped because Firaxis believed it would prove disadvantageous and buggy, and that procedurally-generated objects did not fit in with the game's atmosphere. Enemy Unknown has hand-crafted maps that were all designed by Firaxis. Reception of these maps was generally positive but players complained they became repetitive so Firaxis decided to introduce a system called "the plot and parcel system" to alleviate the developers' workload. The game's producer, Garth DeAngelis, described the game's maps as "quilts". Each map has randomly generated holes of different sizes. Each hole will fit in an object or a destructible building. Side-missions, enemy placements, reinforcements and multiplayer maps are also randomly generated. The implementation of procedural generation created a lot of difficulties and took the team a lot of time to fix.

When developing the game's art, the developers were inspired by films They Live, Elysium, Oblivion and Blade Runner. When designing the game's weapons, characters and environment, they looked at some science fiction films and video games such as Dust: An Elysian Tail but they mostly created original designs. Classic XCOM enemy Sectoids received a new design, which looks "more feral, more imposing" after the species blended with human DNA. The Viper was inspired by the "Snake Men" in the original game and the "Thin Men" in Enemy Unknown, and was created after the gameplay team wanted an enemy who can pull a recruit out from cover. However, players cannot play as the aliens in the single-player mode as they felt that players would not emotionally connect with them. As for the human soldiers, the developers valued diversity and ensured all races are represented in the game because the concept of XCOM is about "humanity banding together from all around the globe". The developers designed more female enemies, such as the Viper and the Berserker. Character customizations are more extensive compared with those in Enemy Unknown, which allows players to develop connections and attachments with characters and that if a playable character dies, the player can feel the impact.

== Release ==
On May 18, 2015, Take-Two Interactive announced a new, untitled AAA game in its annual earning reports. Several days later, on May 25, a teaser website called "Advent Future" was launched. It featured an advertisement of the "Advent Administration", whose aim was "creating a world free from hunger, pain, sickness, and war" but later revealed the Administration had more sinister plans. The game was officially revealed on June 1, 2015, by IGN and its debut cinematic trailer was released.

XCOM 2 was originally set to be released in November 2015 but its release was postponed to February 5, 2016, to allow more time to refine the game. Players who ordered the game before release received a new recruit and the Resistance Warrior Pack, which has extra customization options. 2K collaborated with video game collectible maker Project TriForce to create a Beam Pistol replica for players to purchase, and partnered with novelist Gregory Keyes, who wrote a prequel novel named XCOM 2: Resurrection that was released on November 10, 2015. Firaxis announced the game would only be released for personal computers because of the company's expertise in developing PC games. The team believed making XCOM 2 a PC-only title would allow them to introduce new features such as procedural levels. In addition, developing XCOM 2 for a single platform is simpler. Despite this, the game was released for PlayStation 4 and Xbox One consoles on September 27, 2016; the ports were developed by Blind Squirrel Games. Gamepad support for PC and a mode that allows players to explore the Avengers headquarters in first-person perspective were released in November 2016.

=== Post-release content ===
XCOM 2's season pass was named the "Reinforcement Pack" and included all of the game's downloadable content (DLC). Players responded to the news negatively because they suspected the DLC was cut content. Solomon said all of the game's DLC was made after development of the main game was completed. The packages are "Anarchy's Children", which adds new soldier customization items, was released on March 17, 2016; "Alien Hunters", a pack which adds a new mission, more powerful equipment, additional soldier customization, and new gameplay, was released on May 12, 2016; and "Shen's Last Gift", ostensibly named after the chief engineer of Enemy Unknown and including a sixth soldier class, a new story mission and map, was released on June 30, 2016. An expansion for XCOM 2 titled War of the Chosen was announced at E3 2017; it Introduces the enemy "Chosen" and several other factions, and was released on August 29, 2017. War of the Chosen was later bundled with the main game and other DLC in XCOM 2 Collection, which was released on February 3, 2018. On October 9, 2018, the company released the "Tactical Legacy Pack" that adds a level editor, new and remastered maps, and "Legacy Ops"—a series of missions that links Enemy Unknown and XCOM 2. The XCOM 2 Collection was released for the Nintendo Switch on May 29, 2020. An iOS version was released by Feral Interactive on November 5, 2020. An Android version was released on July 13, 2021.

DeAngelis and Solomon regretted the lack of mod support in Enemy Unknown so the modding aspect of XCOM 2 was increased significantly. Firaxis released the Unreal Development Kit, allowing players to create their own content. Solomon considered mod support a "win-win" method for both players and the company, saying it can increase the game's longevity. Firaxis realized the modding potential of the series when they discovered a mod for Enemy Unknown called Long War. Firaxis partnered with Long War Studios (now Pavonis Interactive) to develop three day-one mods for the game. On January 19, 2017, Pavonis Interactive launched Long War 2 for XCOM 2.

The multiplayer and the challenge mode for the Windows version of the game would be discontinued on March 28, 2022.

== Reception ==
=== Critical reception ===
Reception

Aggregate score
Aggregator	Score
Metacritic	PC: 88/100; PS4: 87/100; XONE: 87/100; NS: 77/100 iOS: 88/100

Review scores
Publication	Score
Destructoid	7/10
Eurogamer	Essential
Game Informer	9.5/10
GameSpot	9/10
GamesRadar+	PC: 4.5/5; PS4: 3.5/5
Giant Bomb	3/5
IGN	9.3/10
PC Gamer (US)	94/100
Polygon	8/10
The Guardian	5/5
TouchArcade	4.5/5

XCOM 2 received "generally favorable" reviews, according to video game review aggregator platform Metacritic. Nic Rowen from Destructoid praised the game for building on the original and expanding the number of tactical options offered to players. He also liked the new enemies, which force players to rethink their tactics before they plan their attacks. Maxwell McGee from GamesRadar+ agreed, singling out the new soldier classes that enable players to use new strategies to defeat enemies. The Guardian's Rich Stanton described the gameplay as "rewarding" because every turn may bring ramifications players need to consider. Writing for Polygon, Charlie Hall stated that he enjoyed the concealment system, which he felt that successfully adds new variations to the XCOM formula. Chris Bratt from Eurogamer agreed, calling the new system "satisfying". Ben Reeves from Game Informer called the gameplay "nerve-wracking" because of the game's intense difficulty; he lauded the balanced gameplay classes, which offer players gameplay options to outsmart the enemies. Procedural generation system received generally positive reviews, with both Reeves and Mike Mahardy from GameSpot saying that it has boosted the game's replay value, extended the game's longevity and made each map believable. Dan Stapleton from IGN admired the procedural generation technology and enjoyed the game's diverse missions.

Hall liked the management aspect of the game, which he thought has "[lent] a great sense of urgency and tension to every decision". Stanton commented that players only have limited resources and time and they have to sort out different priorities, thus making every decision players made an important one. Tom Senior from PC Gamer called the experience "gripping" and added that "the game cleverly uses scarcity of opportunity to force you into difficult dilemmas". McGee was disappointed with the Dark Events as he felt that they were "passive and indirect". McGee liked the strategic aspect but felt that the alien menace was rarely felt. The Avatar Project, which served as the game's doomsday clock, was described by Dan Ryckert from Giant Bomb as a stressful experience, as it made him "question every decision" he has made when he was managing and sorting out the priorities of different tasks. Reeves agreed, saying that "Firaxis' masterclass in strategy design has you second-guessing all your choices and analyzing your smallest decisions". According to Brett, the Avatar Project have successfully propelled players to react and respond instead of constantly grinding for upgrades. Character customization was also widely praised for allowing players to become attached to the soldiers, making each soldier's death impactful and memorable.

The game's difficulty received mixed responses. Rowen said the timed missions are not too difficult but that its "merciless" nature may turn some players away from the game. He also said some of the early missions are "disproportionately difficult" and frustrating to play. McGee enjoyed the challenge and said the timed challenges and other unpredictable elements "keep tensions running high", and that the experience would remain engrossing during subsequent playthroughs. Stanton and Stapleton praised the game's artificial intelligence, which would take every tactical advantage it has to put pressure on players. Stanton said this has made players more responsive and created a forward momentum that Enemy Unknown lacked. Bratt praised the timed missions for encouraging players to take risks and be more offensive. Mahardy noted the difficulty is "fair" and that XCOM 2 is a brutal experience. He also mentioned how the difficulty is sometimes beyond challenging with enemies that occasionally ignore the established gameplay rules.

The game suffered from numerous technical difficulties at launch. While many reviewers noted minor software bugs during their experiences, some critics—including Rowen and Ryckert— said the bugs ruined the experience. Firaxis later issued a performance patch.

=== Sales ===
XCOM 2 sold over 500,000 digital copies on Steam within its first week of release, outpacing the sales of the original game, which was simultaneously released on multiple platforms. Publisher 2K Games was satisfied with the game's performance, saying its successful launch has contributed to the company's better-than-expected financial results for the fiscal year 2016.

=== Awards and accolades ===
Year	Award	Category	Result	Ref.
2016	Golden Joystick Awards 2016	Game of the Year	Nominated	
2016	Golden Joystick Awards 2016	PC Game of the Year	Nominated	
2016	The Game Awards 2016	Best Strategy Game	Nominated	
2016	Canadian Videogame Awards 2016	Fans' Choice: Best International Game	Nominated	
2017	20th Annual D.I.C.E. Awards	Strategy/Simulation Game of the Year	Nominated	
2017	16th Annual NAVGTR Awards	Game Design, Franchise	Nominated	
2017	16th Annual NAVGTR Awards	Game, Strategy	Nominated	
