= XCOM: Enemy Unknown =

2012 video game

- Developer: Firaxis Games
- Publisher: 2K
- Producer: Garth DeAngelis
- Designers: Jake Solomon; Ananda Gupta
- Programmer: Casey O'Toole
- Artist: Gregory Foertsch
- Writers: Scott Wittbecker; Liam Collins
- Composer: Michael McCann
- Series: XCOM
- Engine: Unreal Engine 3
- Platforms: Microsoft Windows; PlayStation 3; Xbox 360; OS X; iOS; Android; Linux; PlayStation Vita
- Release: October 9, 2012: Windows, PlayStation 3, Xbox 360; NA: October 9, 2012; EU: October 12, 2012; AU: October 12, 2012 OS X; WW: April 25, 2013 iOS; WW: June 20, 2013 Android; WW: April 23, 2014 Linux; WW: June 19, 2014 PlayStation Vita; EU: March 21, 2016
- Genre: Turn-based tactics
- Modes: Single-player, multiplayer

XCOM: Enemy Unknown is a 2012 turn-based tactics video game developed by Firaxis Games and published by 2K. It is a "reimagining" of the 1994 strategy game UFO: Enemy Unknown (also known as X-COM: UFO Defense). XCOM: Enemy Unknown is set during an alien invasion of Earth in an alternative version of 2015; the player controls an elite, multinational, paramilitary organization called XCOM and commands troops in a series of turn-based tactical missions. Between missions, the player directs the research and development of technologies from recovered alien technology and captured prisoners, expands XCOM's base of operations, manages finances, and monitors and responds to alien activity.

Firaxis attempted to reboot the franchise in 2003 but no product was marketed. Development of the game began in 2008 and lasted for four-and-a-half years. The game was initially envisioned as an exact remake of the 1994 game but the developers introduced improvements to gameplay mechanics and modernized the franchise. The development cycle was longer than those of other Firaxis games because it was retooled several times during production. Jake Solomon led development of the game, and studio head Sid Meier provided input and assisted the team. Aliens from the original game return in Enemy Unknown, though Firaxis redesigned many of them. While the game uses procedural generation for enemy placement, all maps in the game were handcrafted by Firaxis. Michael McCann composed the game's music.

XCOM: Enemy Unknown was announced in January 2012, and was released for Microsoft Windows, PlayStation 3 and Xbox 360 in October 2012. Handheld and mobile versions of the game, co-developed by 2K China, were later released. The game received generally positive reviews from critics, who praised the turn-based combat, presentation, emergent gameplay, difficulty and replayability but criticized its multiplayer component. It has since been considered as one of the greatest games of all time. It was a commercial success for the publisher and several gaming publications nominated it for year-end accolades, including Game of the Year. Firaxis released an expansion pack called XCOM: Enemy Within in November 2013 and a sequel called XCOM 2 in 2016. XCOM: Enemy Unknown was often credited for renewing interest in the turn-based-tactics genre in the 2010s.

== Gameplay ==
=== Combat missions ===
In a mission, players can issue commands to a squad of between one and six human soldiers. Taking cover behind objects is essential for a soldier's survival.

XCOM: Enemy Unknown casts the player as the commander of an elite military organization who directs soldiers in turn-based combat missions against invading alien enemies. The player controls a squad of between one and six human soldiers or robotic units as they explore the game's levels. Most missions in the campaign occur on maps randomly selected from a handcrafted set; enemies are then randomly placed on these maps. Fog of war hides aliens and their actions from view until the player's soldiers are in range and have line of sight to them. Most missions require players to eliminate all threats in a map, though some require players to rescue civilians or extract a target. Players can choose to retreat and abandon the mission if the situation goes awry. The game has four difficulty levels: easy, normal, classic and "impossible". There is also an "ironman mode", which limits the player to one save.

On the player's turn, each squad member can perform a limited number of actions. After all soldiers have performed actions, the artificial intelligence-controlled enemy takes its turn. Soldiers can be instructed to move, attack or both, depending on their available action points. Other actions such as reloading, remaining in overwatch to shoot any moving enemy in the line of sight, healing, throwing grenades and using special abilities can also be performed. Attacking or dashing large distances across the map will immediately end a squad member's turn. The game's user interface informs the player of the possibility of landing a successful shot and the amount of damage they will deal. Squad members can take cover behind objects, reducing the chance of being hit. The amount of defense a squad member has is indicated by a shield icon. Full cover is indicated by a filled blue icon and half cover is indicated by a half-filled blue icon. A yellow-and-red shield shown to players warns they are being flanked or being completely exposed, respectively. Soldiers will sustain more injuries from attacks due to the lack of defense. Cover may be destroyed through missed shots or the use of explosives.

As soldiers progress through the game, they earn experience and are promoted, allowing players to specialize them. As soldiers earn promotions, for each rank they gain, players can select one out of two perks, although on the ranks of Squaddie and Major, only one perk is available. The game has four character classes, each with unique weapons, gadgets and abilities. The Assault class can attack after dashing; the Support class can heal teammates more effectively and provide additional support; the Heavy class wields a rocket launcher, and the Sniper class is equipped with a sniper rifle, allowing it to kill enemies from afar with a high critical-damage bonus. Some soldiers may have access to psychic powers, allowing them to boost their team's willpower, reduce the enemy's combat efficiency, and briefly take control of enemy units. Classes are assigned randomly and cannot be changed. Each recruit's name and appearance can be customized. Soldiers may permanently die once their health reaches zero if they are not saved in time. Soldiers can experience panic during a mission, which can make the player lose control of that character for a turn.

The game has a multiplayer mode for one-on-one tactical battles. Players spend a points budget on assembling a squad of up to six humans, aliens, or a mixture of both. Weapons, armor and gadgets of human units are customizable. A simplified version of the single-player perk system is present. Alien units may not be customized but have the abilities of corresponding aliens types in the game's single-player mode.

=== Base management ===
XCOM's underground headquarters is presented in a view dubbed the "ant farm". From this view, the player manages construction, manufacturing and research projects, and directs scientists and engineers to use resources recovered from missions. Some resources can be sold to other XCOM nations through the gray market. As the player progresses through the game, they unlock new weapons, armor improvements and technology to improve each recruit's efficiency. Performing interrogations and autopsies on captured aliens yields additional rewards. It is also where recruits in the game rest, exercise and tend to their wounds. A memorial wall to soldiers killed in action is also visible. A holographic view of Earth called the "Geoscape" allows the player to track situations around the world, order aircraft to intercept UFOs and dispatch soldiers to engage aliens on the ground. Which situations the player decides to respond to influences the panic level of XCOM's member nations: responding in an area decreases panic while ignoring an area causes a rise in panic and potential for the nation to pull out of XCOM. Once a nation decides to leave it will never rejoin, meaning players will have fewer funds for the rest of the game. The game will end If eight out of the sixteen Council nations decide to leave. Passive bonuses are provided; these are dependent on which continent the player chooses for a base location. The player can better detect alien activity by launching satellites and positioning them over territories of the 16 XCOM nations. Passive bonuses can also be obtained by providing satellite coverage over each Council nation in a continent.

== Plot ==
=== Setting ===
The game's campaign begins in early 2015 as a global alien invasion begins. Prior to the start of the game, a group of countries called the Council of Nations has banded together to create Extraterrestrial Combat Unit (XCOM), the most elite military and scientific organization in human history that is tasked with defending the nations from alien attack. The player assumes the role of the commander of XCOM and engages in a war against an extraterrestrial enemy with overwhelming technological superiority.

=== Story ===
In March 2015, a series of extraterrestrial objects land in a major German city. A squad of four soldiers is sent to investigate the incident. Upon entering a warehouse, the squad finds a small, alien creature mind-controlling German soldiers. The squad is ambushed; all-but-one of the soldiers are killed before the area is secured. Alien attacks begin all over the globe.

After shooting down alien scout ships and securing the crash sites from surviving alien crews, as well as interdicting alien attempts to abduct human civilians for unknown purposes, XCOM obtains the corpses of various alien troops. Autopsies reveal all of these alien types have been genetically or cybernetically altered, which seems to indicate they are foot-soldiers for unseen leaders. XCOM's head of research Dr. Vahlen requests the capture of a live alien for interrogation, which involves the development of a weapon that can capture a live alien and the construction of a facility in XCOM's subterranean base to safely hold a live alien prisoner.

XCOM captures one of the alien troops and interrogates it, revealing vague information about another type of alien called the Outsiders, which are artificially-created, crystalline beings that are encountered aboard unidentified flying objects (UFOs) and appear to serve as pilots and navigators. Dr. Vahlen then requests XCOM capture an Outsider for study. An Outsider is captured and examined, revealing their exotic, crystalline structures behave in a manner similar to antennas, receiving a signal broadcast from an underground location on Earth. XCOM dispatches a team to investigate the signal, which is found to be coming from a secret alien base where experiments are performed on abducted humans.

XCOM develops a method for gaining entry to the alien base and assaults it. During the mission, the alien base commander is discovered to have psychic abilities but the soldiers defeat it. The commander's psychic communication device is recovered and reverse engineered. Tapping into the aliens' communications reveals a stealth Overseer spacecraft is patrolling above Earth. The craft is shot down and is found to hold an alien species that had not yet been encountered, as well as a strange psionic artifact. The newly discovered species, called Ethereals, have powerful psionic abilities.

Once the Overseer ship is shot down and the psionic artifact recovered, a massive enemy "Temple Ship" in low Earth orbit over Brazil reveals itself and starts causing earthquakes. The reverse-engineering efforts enable XCOM to unlock and develop latent psionic powers that are present in some humans, thus enhancing their human soldiers. The most powerful of these human psychic soldiers becomes the Volunteer, who uses the psionic artifact to tap into the aliens' psychic communication "hive", an experience that also increases their psionic strength, allows the Volunteer to attack and board the Temple Ship, and seek the Uber Ethereal, the leader of the alien invasion.

During the final battle aboard the ship, the Uber Ethereal reveals that, because of their failure to further improve their own race, the Ethereals have been experimenting on other species throughout the universe to identify a race that is mentally and physically strong enough to be "Uplifted". By allowing humans to slowly obtain their technology, the Ethereals allowed humans to evolve to a fuller potential and believe humanity may be the culmination of their search for the perfect species to prepare for "what lies ahead", a vaguely worded destiny they do not further describe.

After slaying the Uber Ethereal, the Temple Ship begins to collapse into itself, creating a black hole that would destroy Earth due to its proximity. The Volunteer urges the other XCOM soldiers to evacuate the doomed ship but stays behind, using the psychic gift to control the ship and fly it further from Earth, causing the ship to self-destruct.

== Development ==
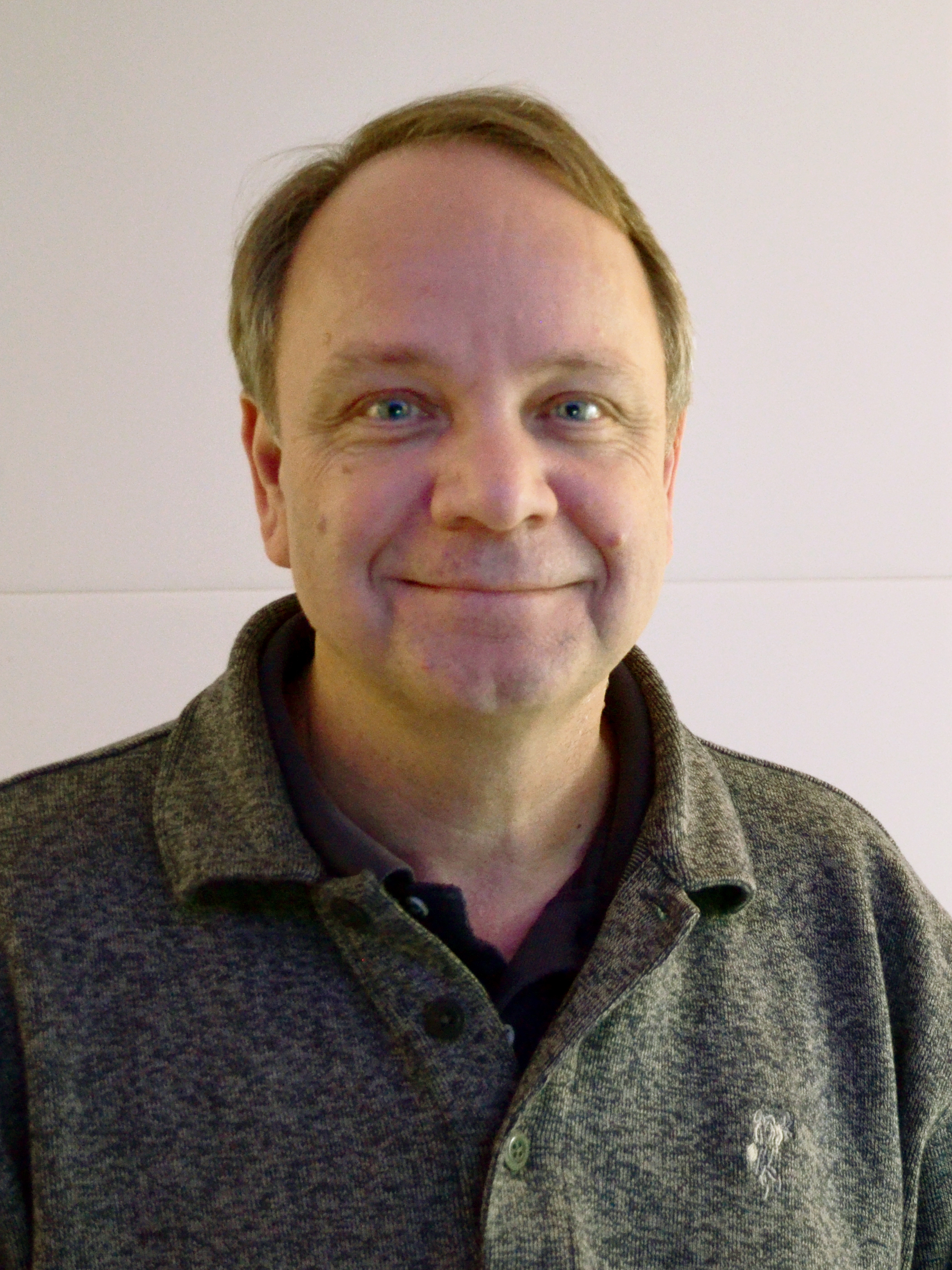
Sid Meier, the founder of Firaxis and the creator of the Civilization series, provided consultation for the game.

Development of XCOM: Enemy Unknown commenced at Firaxis Games in early 2008 as a "very, very big budget" project with a team of 50 to 60 developers. XCOM: Enemy Unknown was developed independently of 2K Marin's XCOM, which was later rebranded as The Bureau: XCOM Declassified, and although the two games are set in different universes, the games' developers were in contact with one another. Enemy Unknown was the first title Firaxis Games developed that did not feature the name of Sid Meier, who was not directly involved in the game's development.

=== Project origin ===
Being a fan of UFO: Enemy Unknown (1994), director Jake Solomon had repeatedly petitioned Firaxis' leaders to create a sequel since he joined the studio. In 2003, Solomon was given six months to lead a team and develop a prototype for an XCOM game. He and other programmers quickly wrote a game engine using assets from media such as Unreal Tournament. In this early demo, which used an extensive inventory-management system, players explored a large, open area and eliminated alien threats. Reflecting on this version of the game, Solomon said it was a "classic case of overengineering". Firaxis deemed the project "unenjoyable" and quickly shut it down. Solomon continued to assist studio head Sid Meier on Civilization projects for four years until the studio decided to diversify its portfolio. While working on Civilization Revolution, Solomon was given another chance to develop an XCOM game.

In early prototypes, Solomon envisioned the game as a remake of the first game in the XCOM franchise. Gameplay features such as fog of war, multiplayer, and cinematic cameras were already included. The programming team, who deemed the task impossible due to time constraints and the restraints of Unreal Engine 3, rejected his desire to include procedurally generated maps. In 2009, a vertical slice of the game was shown to other members of Firaxis. A cover system is absent from this version of the game. Players can freely move their units as long as they have enough "time units". While the development team was confident, it was met with a mediocre response within the studio. Some reviewers enjoyed its complexities but most of them did not understand the concept. Reflecting on the demo, art director Greg Foertsch called it "painful" but Solomon recognized his prototype was "more complicated" than the original, making the experience unenjoyable. As a result, the team decided to remake the entire game, abandoning materials they had developed over a year and a half. The game had one of the longest development cycles of a Firaxis game, which typically only took two to two-and-a-half years.

=== Gameplay design ===
Solomon and his team then improved the game, which was given the working title Combat 2.0. The team decided to add a tile grid for squad movement. In an early prototype of the game, each soldier had one tactical value that determined how effective they were at offense and defense. This number was later separated into offense and defense, which were altered based on factors such as height advantage, cover, or being flanked. Firaxis held weekly meetings called "Mutator Mondays", in which all team members discussed the state of the game and introduced a modifier that would change gameplay for that week. Through these meetings, the studio attempted to improve the overall's game experience or discard existing systems that were detrimental to gameplay. Time units, angled cover, base invasion, and lines that help players visualize their ability to take a clear shot at enemies were removed from the game. Despite restarting development, the team did not want to completely overhaul UFO: Enemy Unknown and instead intended to modernize the gameplay experience. Gameplay was changed, such as giving soldiers the ability to use special skills, and limiting the maximum squad size to six. The developers experimented with a larger squad size but they felt this made each move less meaningful, and affected the game's momentum and pacing. According to DeAngelis, each combat mission should last around 20 minutes and more-lengthy missions should not exceed 50 minutes. According to Sid Meier, the game was designed to cater for fans of action games, real-time strategy games and role-playing video games.

The team deemed "permanent death, destruction and turn-based combat" the franchise's major pillars. The game was intended to be challenging, but the team wanted it to be accessible to newcomers. As a result, an extensive-but-optional tutorial section was included at the beginning of the game. The team also wanted the game to be fair so, unlike the original game, aliens will not attack the player until they are revealed. Solomon identified the series' strength as its ability to demonstrate consequences. A poor decision may lead to very tangible results, such as the loss of a soldier or a nation's support, or the failure of a mission. By introducing permadeath, the team hoped to invoke a sense of unnerving despair and recreating the tense atmosphere from the original game. Producer Garth DeAngelis further added that through these losses, the team created a "sense of fear reverberating through the entire experience". Regardless of the player's actions, Firaxis decided to not comment on them to avoid pushing players into performing certain actions or causing them to second-guess themselves. Solomon said XCOM is "an unfeeling collection of systems" that induces stress in players by forcing them to recognize the game did not care if they make the correct decision.

The game's strategic layer also went through multiple changes and was redesigned two years into the game's development. Solomon experimented with different gameplay ideas; it once included gameplay mechanics that were inspired by tower defense video games and card games. To illustrate the game's strategic management, Solomon and Meier built an XCOM board game using pieces from Risk. Meier wanted the game to be turn-based but Solomon wanted it to remain real-time. The two spent a weekend creating a prototype for each of their proposed versions; Solomon's proposal was chosen as the final solution. Initially, the base-management portion of the game was played from an isometric perspective, which created unintentional gameplay and visibility issues. The team then switched to a side-on view that was inspired by books of cross-sections and cutaways.

Multiplayer had been intended as a part of the package since the project's inception. The team wanted players to feel like a "brilliant tactician" and believed the only way to achieve this was to have the player face other human opponents instead of competing against AI. Tabletop games inspired the multiplayer mode. Solomon described the mode as "straightforward" but "endlessly complex"; while its objectives were simple, the diversity of units meant that players cannot predict what strategy they will need to adopt in a match. The inclusion of multiplayer was initially controversial, though the team reiterated that it would only add to the experience without affecting the single-player mode. While the campaign only allows players to command human soldiers, the multiplayer deathmatch mode allowed them to control alien units directly.

=== Art and music ===
The developers, who were inspired by animals such as insects, spider monkeys and gorillas, wanted to modernize designs for some of the aliens from UFO: Enemy Unknown. The team first designed the Sectoids, the first alien species players encounter in the game and have been described a "classic big-headed alien" that were conceived as easily recognizable. Other aliens in later parts of the game had more outlandish designs. The Sectoids demonstrate more "animalistic" behaviors than they did in UFO: Enemy Unknown. The Mutons were designed to be physically imposing and ape-like; the Chryssalids are now an alien quadruped with no humanoid characteristics; the Thin Men, who are infiltrators disguised as humans, are unnaturally slender and their design was inspired by human characters in the animated series Æon Flux. Other alien designs in the game were inspired by Men in Black and The X-Files.

Plans to include large-scale aliens were scrapped. The Sectopods were originally intended to be a huge, hulking enemy but were significantly shrunk to ensure they can spawn in several of the game's levels instead of existing only as a setpiece. Designs that were scrapped include the Battletoad, which could pull soldiers out of their cover and eat them. The design of XCOM's soldiers was inspired by action figures; the team strove for a stylized, bright, flat-textured look. Earth was chosen as the game's setting because it was relatable for players. The team juxtaposed recognizable locales with aliens to create an eerie atmosphere.

Roland Rizzo, who has been working on the X-COM series since its inception, became the audio lead for XCOM: Enemy Unknown, and was tasked with re-imagining and updating John Broomhall's original music score. Rizzo replayed UFO: Enemy Unknown to better understand the music. Michael McCann was recruited to compose the game's musical score after the team heard his score for Deus Ex: Human Revolution. The soundtracks for the game are predominantly dark, synthwave music.

== Release ==
Game Informer revealed XCOM: Enemy Unknown on January 5, 2012. Firaxis and publisher 2K described the game as a "reimagining" of X-COM: UFO Defense (1994). A playable demo of the game was available at E3 2012. Pre-ordering the game granted players access to an Elite Soldier Pack, which included the "Classic X-COM Soldier"—a haircut for the player's male soldier based on the model for troops in UFO: Enemy Unknown—and the option to customize the aesthetic design of soldiers' armor. Players who preordered on Steam also received bonus items for Valve Corporation's video game Team Fortress 2 and a free copy of Firaxis' 2010 strategy game Civilization V. XCOM: Enemy Unknown's playable demo version was released in September 2012.

XCOM: Enemy Unknown was released for Windows PC, PlayStation 3 and Xbox 360 in North America on October 9, 2012, and in Europe on October 12, 2012. An iOS port was released on June 20, 2013. Firaxis described the game's mobile release as a premium product. The team had to decrease the file size of the mobile version by decreasing the number of maps available and lowering texture resolutions. The mobile versions of the game were co-developed by 2K China. A version for Android was released on April 24, 2014. XCOM: Enemy Unknown Plus, which includes the base game, Enemy Within and other DLC packs, was released for PlayStation Vita on March 22, 2016. Feral Interactive released the game for OS X and Linux in May 2013 and June 2014, respectively.

Firaxis supported Enemy Unknown with post-launch content. The first downloadable content (DLC) pack, titled Slingshot, was released on November 4, 2012; it introduces several new council missions and a new playable character. A free DLC titled Second Wave was released on January 4, 2013. It introduced adjustments to gameplay. An expansion pack titled XCOM: Enemy Within, which was released worldwide on November 15, 2013. retains the core storyline but adds a broad variety of content, including new weapons, special missions and the ability to enhance soldiers via genetic engineering and cybernetic implants. It also introduces forty new maps in the campaign mode and eight new multiplayer maps.

== Reception ==
=== Critical reception ===
Reception

Aggregate score
Aggregator	Score
Metacritic	PC: 89/100; PS3: 89/100; X360: 90/100 iOS: 91/100; VITA: 82/100

Review scores
Publication	Score
Destructoid	9/10
Eurogamer	9/10
Game Informer	9.5/10
GameSpot	8.5/10
GameSpy	5/5
Giant Bomb	5/5
IGN	8.2/10
PC Gamer (US)	87/100
Polygon	8.5/10
VentureBeat	85/100

According to review aggregator website Metacritic, XCOM: Enemy Unknown received "generally favourable reviews" from critics. Franchise creator Julian Gollop also praised the game, describing it as an "addictive and absorbing" experience; he liked the new alien design and enjoyed the challenging gameplay.

Evan Lahti from PC Gamer praised Firaxis for understanding the core gameplay pillars of the franchise and modernizing them for a new audience, resulting in a combat system that was "more coherent and elegant" than similar games in the same genre. He also liked the way the combat captured the "childlike joy" of moving a squad of action figures. Dan Stapleton from GameSpy described the game as "an amazingly addictive, challenging, and rewarding experience", praised its improvements over the gameplay of UFO: Enemy Unknown, and said its difficulty and randomness made it highly replayable. Kevin VanOrd from GameSpot wrote that the randomness of combat heightened the tension and anxiety, and the cinematic camera "[dramatized] the successes and failures". Steve Butts from IGN praised the environmental destructibility, which highlighted the "intensity of the battle" while providing new opportunities for players to plan their attacks. The lack of procedurally generated maps was criticized. Ryan Davis from Giant Bomb said the game was challenging but fair, and praised Firaxis for presenting the game's intricate mechanics in a way that was "digestible" for newcomers. Writing for Destructoid, Allistair Pinsof also praised the game's more-approachable nature. Multiplayer mode, however, was criticized for being too light on content.

Lahti was disappointed the base did not evolve despite the construction of new rooms, and that injured soldiers were never visualized in the base. He said these shortcomings can be easily overlooked because it was "a style of game that arguably hasn't existed" for nearly a decade. Stapleton liked the game for creating a sense of urgency because panic level will rise regardless of the player's actions, motivating players to perform well in ground combat missions. He also criticized base management for its "clumsy" user interface. Davis wrote he most enjoyed the "jigsaw nature of the administrative part", saying that resources being insufficient for pursuing all objectives forced players to compromise and prioritize certain research and construction projects. Pinsof also liked the looming threat of a game over scenario that resulted in a "relentlessly tense experience". Writing for Polygon, Russ Pitts wrote that the open-ended management options were at odds with the game's linear narrative structure, and that the turn-based combat outshone the game's strategic component.

Rob Savillo from VentureBeat wrote that players were frequently tasked with making choices whose outcomes were not immediately noticeable. Each soldier action and each strategic decision may result in unforeseen, irreversible consequences. He commended the Ironman mode for making all player decisions meaningful because they cannot reload a save. He praised the game for combining two distinct genres successfully, adding that it was "peerless in modern game design". VanOrd compared the premise to The War of the Worlds and noted the game never humanized its alien antagonists. Lahti and Pinsoff commented on the game's light narrative, but remarked that emergent gameplay created unique and personal stories for each player. Pinsof wrote the game sometimes punished players for failing but a small chance of victory always motivated them to continue playing. Arthur Gies from Polygon remarked that the losses in the game were "simultaneously heartbreaking and ruthlessly educational", as each failure prompted players to study the game's mechanics and refine their skills, thus encouraging them to replay the game repeatedly. Adam Biessener from Game Informer wrote that turn-based combat and real-time management presented "life-or-death conundrums to which there is no right answer", and concluded his review by writing XCOM: Enemy Unknown is a "singular achievement that every gamer deserves to experience".

=== Sales ===
The week of its release, XCOM: Enemy Unknown was the best selling game on Steam and the seventh best-selling at retail in the UK. In the United States, it sold 114,000 copies and failed to enter the US monthly sales chart. In February 2013, CEO of Take-Two Interactive Strauss Zelnick said the game was a commercial success for the company and had sold well digitally. According to Zelnick, the mobile version of the game was also a success, with the game being ranked as one of the highest-grossing release for iPad in its first week of release.

=== Accolades ===
GameSpy, Kotaku, MTV, Giant Bomb, and GameTrailers selected XCOM: Enemy Unknown as their Game of the Year.

Year	Ceremony	Category	Result	Ref.
2012	Spike TV Video Game Awards	PC Game of the Year	Won	
2013	16th Annual D.I.C.E. Awards	Game of the Year	Nominated	
2013	16th Annual D.I.C.E. Awards	Strategy/Simulation Game of the Year	Won	
2013	16th Annual D.I.C.E. Awards	Outstanding Achievement in Gameplay Engineering	Won	
2013	9th British Academy Games Awards	Game Design	Nominated	
2013	9th British Academy Games Awards	Strategy	Won	
2013	2013 Game Developers Choice Awards	Game of the Year	Nominated	
2013	2013 Game Developers Choice Awards	Best Game Design	Nominated	
2013	Golden Joystick Awards 2013	Best Mobile/Tablet Game of the Year	Won	

== Legacy ==
The game, which was released when interest in turn-based strategy games was low, introduced the genre to a new generation of players. PC Gamer's Fraser Brown, in a 2019 article, wrote that XCOM: Enemy Unknown "came along and lit a fire under the genre, arguably kicking off the decade of turn-based tactics games". The term "XCOM" became synonymous with the genre. In October 2022, Alex Donaldson from VG247 described the game as "the best franchise reboot of all time", praising Firaxis' ability to recapture the essence of the original game while modernizing it for a new generation of audience.

Firaxis developed a sequel to XCOM: Enemy Unknown titled XCOM 2. The game takes place 20 years after the events of Enemy Unknown; its story is an alternative scenario in which XCOM failed to stop the alien invasion and humanity surrendered. The player controls a small resistance movement fighting the alien conquerors. XCOM 2 was released for Windows in February 2016 and for consoles in September the same year. A spin-off game, XCOM: Chimera Squad, was released in April 2020. A board game based on Enemy Unknown, developed and published by Fantasy Flight Games, was released on January 28, 2015.

In early 2013, a partial conversion mod for the game was released. Titled Long War, the mod introduced changes to many of the game's existing features, added new concepts, and brought back more concepts from the original game. The mod was praised by players and members of the Firaxis development team, and 2K recruited the team to create several day-one mods for XCOM 2.
