= List of games by Firaxis Games =

Video games by developer

Firaxis Games is an American video game developer based in Sparks, Maryland. It was founded in May 1996 by Sid Meier, Jeff Briggs and Brian Reynolds as Firaxis Software, following their departure from MicroProse, which Meier had co-founded. The company was renamed to Firaxis Games in July 1997 prior to releasing any titles. It produced seven games primarily for Microsoft Windows personal computers over the next nine years through multiple publishers; these games include wargames such as their first title, Sid Meier's Gettysburg! (1997), and 4X turn-based strategy games, all with the prefix "Sid Meier's" in their official titles. Three of the games were part of the company's flagship Civilization series of 4X games, which was originally begun by Meier at MicroProse. In November 2004, Take-Two Interactive purchased the publishing rights to the series from then-rights holder Infogrames, and a year later in November 2005, after the release of Civilization IV, acquired Firaxis. It became part of the publisher's 2K Games label, and has published exclusively through them since.

Since 2005, Firaxis has released ten further titles related to the Civilization series, primarily 4X games. The other releases include three titles in the X-COM series of turn-based tactics games, three other tactics games, a railroad business simulation game, and a mobile real-time strategy game. Meier is the only founder remaining at the company, where he is the creative director. Firaxis' most recent title is Civilization VII (2025). Firaxis Games has worked on 25 games since 1996, 12 of which are part of the Civilization series.

== Games ==
List of games
Game	Details
Sid Meier's Gettysburg! Original release date: October 16, 1997	Release years by system: 1997 – Windows
Sid Meier's Gettysburg! Original release date: October 16, 1997	Notes: Real-time wargame; Published by Electronic Arts; Included in the Sid Meier's Civil War Collection (2000) compilation
Sid Meier's Alpha Centauri Original release date: February 12, 1999	Release years by system: 1999 – Windows; 2000 – Mac OS, Linux
Sid Meier's Alpha Centauri Original release date: February 12, 1999	Notes: 4X turn-based strategy game; Published by Electronic Arts; Spiritual sequel to the Civilization series; An expansion pack, Sid Meier's Alien Crossfire (1999), developed by Firaxis and published by Electronic Arts; Both Alpha Centauri and Alien Crossfire included in the Alpha Centauri Planetary Pack (2000) and The Laptop Collection (2003) compilations
Sid Meier's Antietam! Original release date: December 10, 1999	Release years by system: 1999 – Windows
Sid Meier's Antietam! Original release date: December 10, 1999	Notes: Real-time wargame; Developed by Firaxis and BreakAway Games and published digitally by Electronic Arts; Included in the Sid Meier's Civil War Collection (2000) compilation
Civilization III Original release date: October 31, 2001	Release years by system: 2001 – Windows; 2002 – Mac OS
Civilization III Original release date: October 31, 2001	Notes: 4X turn-based strategy game; Published by Infogrames; Part of the Civilization series; Two expansion packs, Civilization III: Play the World (2002) and Civilization III: Conquests (2003), developed by Firaxis and published by Infogrames (Conquests as Atari); Civilization III: Gold Edition (2003) includes the original game and Play the World; Civilization III: Complete (2004) includes the original game and both expansion packs; Included in the Civilization Chronicles (2006) compilation along with expansions
Sid Meier's SimGolf Original release date: January 24, 2002	Release years by system: 2002 – Windows
Sid Meier's SimGolf Original release date: January 24, 2002	Notes: Simulation / sports game; Published by Electronic Arts; Part of the Sim series
Sid Meier's Pirates! Original release date: November 23, 2004	Release years by system: 2004 – Windows; 2005 – Xbox; 2007 – PlayStation Portable; 2008 – macOS; 2010 – Wii; 2011 – iOS; 2012 – Windows Phone
Sid Meier's Pirates! Original release date: November 23, 2004	Notes: Action-adventure / strategy game; Published by Atari; Remake of Sid Meier's Pirates! (1987)
Civilization IV Original release date: October 25, 2005	Release years by system: 2005 – Windows; 2006 – macOS
Civilization IV Original release date: October 25, 2005	Notes: 4X turn-based strategy game; Published by 2K Games; Part of the Civilization series; Two expansion packs, Civilization IV: Warlords (2006) and Civilization IV: Beyond the Sword (2007), developed by Firaxis and published by 2K Games; Civilization IV: Gold Edition (2007) includes the original game and Warlords; Civilization IV: Complete (2007) includes the original game and both expansion packs; Included without expansions in the Civilization Chronicles (2006) compilation and with expansions in Civilization IV: The Complete Edition (2009) compilation
CivCity: Rome Original release date: July 25, 2006	Release years by system: 2006 – Windows
CivCity: Rome Original release date: July 25, 2006	Notes: City-building game; Developed by Firaxis and Firefly Studios; published by 2K Games; Part of the Civilization series
Sid Meier's Railroads! Original release date: October 17, 2006	Release years by system: 2006 – Windows; 2012 – macOS
Sid Meier's Railroads! Original release date: October 17, 2006	Notes: Business simulation game; Published by 2K Games; Part of the Railroad Tycoon series
Civilization Revolution Original release date: June 6, 2008	Release years by system: 2008 – PlayStation 3, Xbox 360, Nintendo DS; 2009 – iOS; 2012 – Windows Phone
Civilization Revolution Original release date: June 6, 2008	Notes: 4X turn-based strategy game; Published by 2K Games; Part of the Civilization series
Civilization IV: Colonization Original release date: September 21, 2008	Release years by system: 2008 – Windows; 2009 – macOS
Civilization IV: Colonization Original release date: September 21, 2008	Notes: 4X turn-based strategy game; Published by 2K Games; Remake of Sid Meier's Colonization (1994); Part of the Civilization series; Included in the Civilization IV: The Complete Edition (2009) compilation
Civilization V Original release date: September 21, 2010	Release years by system: 2010 – Windows, macOS; 2014 – Linux
Civilization V Original release date: September 21, 2010	Notes: 4X turn-based strategy game; Published by 2K Games; Part of the Civilization series; Two expansion packs, Civilization V: Gods & Kings (2012) and Civilization V: Brave New World (2013), developed by Firaxis and published by 2K Games; additional downloadable content (DLC) also released; Civilization V: Game of the Year Edition (2011) includes the original game and all DLC released to date; Civilization V: Gold (2013) includes the original game, Gods & Kings, and all DLC; Civilization V: The Complete Edition (2014) includes the original game, both expansion packs, and all DLC
Civilization World Original release date: July 7, 2011	Release years by system: 2011 – Facebook Platform
Civilization World Original release date: July 7, 2011	Notes: Massively multiplayer online real-time strategy game; Published by 2K Games; Part of the Civilization series; Also known as CivWorld; named Civilization Network prior to launch; Shut down on May 29, 2013
XCOM: Enemy Unknown Original release date: October 9, 2012	Release years by system: 2012 – Windows, PlayStation 3, Xbox 360; 2013 – macOS, iOS; 2014 – Android, Linux; 2016 – PlayStation Vita
XCOM: Enemy Unknown Original release date: October 9, 2012	Notes: Turn-based tactics game; Published by 2K Games; Remake of UFO: Enemy Unknown (1994); Part of the X-COM series; One expansion pack, XCOM: Enemy Within (2013), developed by Firaxis and published by 2K Games; additional DLC also released; XCOM: Enemy Unknown Plus (2016) includes the original game, Enemy Within, and all DLC to date
Haunted Hollow Original release date: May 2, 2013	Release years by system: 2013 – iOS
Haunted Hollow Original release date: May 2, 2013	Notes: Real-time strategy game; Published by 2K Games
Sid Meier's Ace Patrol Original release date: May 9, 2013	Release years by system: 2013 – Windows, iOS
Sid Meier's Ace Patrol Original release date: May 9, 2013	Notes: Turn-based tactics game; Published by 2K Games
Sid Meier's Ace Patrol: Pacific Skies Original release date: November 7, 2013	Release years by system: 2013 – Windows, iOS
Sid Meier's Ace Patrol: Pacific Skies Original release date: November 7, 2013	Notes: Turn-based tactics game; Published by 2K Games
Civilization Revolution 2 Original release date: July 2, 2014	Release years by system: 2014 – Android, iOS; 2015 – PlayStation Vita
Civilization Revolution 2 Original release date: July 2, 2014	Notes: 4X turn-based strategy game; Published by 2K Games; Part of the Civilization series; PlayStation Vita release is an expanded version titled Civilization Revolution 2 Plus
Civilization: Beyond Earth Original release date: October 24, 2014	Release years by system: 2014 – Windows, macOS, Linux
Civilization: Beyond Earth Original release date: October 24, 2014	Notes: 4X turn-based strategy game; Published by 2K Games; Part of the Civilization series; One expansion pack, Civilization: Beyond Earth – Rising Tide (2015), developed by Firaxis and published by 2K Games
Sid Meier's Starships Original release date: March 12, 2015	Release years by system: 2015 – Windows, macOS, iOS
Sid Meier's Starships Original release date: March 12, 2015	Notes: 4X turn-based strategy game; Published by 2K Games; Part of the Civilization series; features cross-connectivity features with Civilization: Beyond Earth
XCOM 2 Original release dates: February 5, 2016	Release years by system: 2016 – Windows, macOS, Linux, PlayStation 4, Xbox One; 2020 – Nintendo Switch, iOS; 2021 – Android
XCOM 2 Original release dates: February 5, 2016	Notes: Turn-based tactics game; Published by 2K Games; Part of the X-COM series; One expansion pack, XCOM 2: War of the Chosen (2017), developed by Firaxis and published by 2K Games; additional DLC also released; iOS and Nintendo Switch versions named XCOM 2 Collection (2020), published by Feral Interactive, and include expansion pack and DLC
Civilization VI Original release date: October 21, 2016	Release years by system: 2016 – Windows, macOS; 2017 – Linux, iOS; 2018 – Switch; 2019 – PlayStation 4, Xbox One; 2020 – Android
Civilization VI Original release date: October 21, 2016	Notes: 4X turn-based strategy game; Published by 2K Games; Part of the Civilization series; Two expansion packs, Civilization VI: Rise and Fall (2018) and Civilization VI: Gathering Storm (2019), developed by Firaxis and published by 2K Games; additional DLC also released
XCOM: Chimera Squad Original release date: April 24, 2020	Release years by system: 2020 – Windows
XCOM: Chimera Squad Original release date: April 24, 2020	Notes: Turn-based tactics game; Published by 2K Games; Part of the X-COM series
Marvel's Midnight Suns Original release date: December 2, 2022	Release years by system: 2022 – Windows, PlayStation 5, Xbox Series X/S; 2023 – PlayStation 4, Xbox One
Marvel's Midnight Suns Original release date: December 2, 2022	Notes: Turn-based tactics game based on the Marvel Universe; Published by 2K Games; Nintendo Switch port planned but canceled
Sid Meier's Civilization VII Original release date: February 11, 2025	Release years by system: 2025 – PC (Windows, macOS, Linux), Nintendo Switch, PlayStation 4, PlayStation 5, Xbox One, Xbox Series X/S
Sid Meier's Civilization VII Original release date: February 11, 2025	Notes: Developed by Firaxis Games and published by 2K Games; Part of the Civilization series
