= Geoff Knorr =

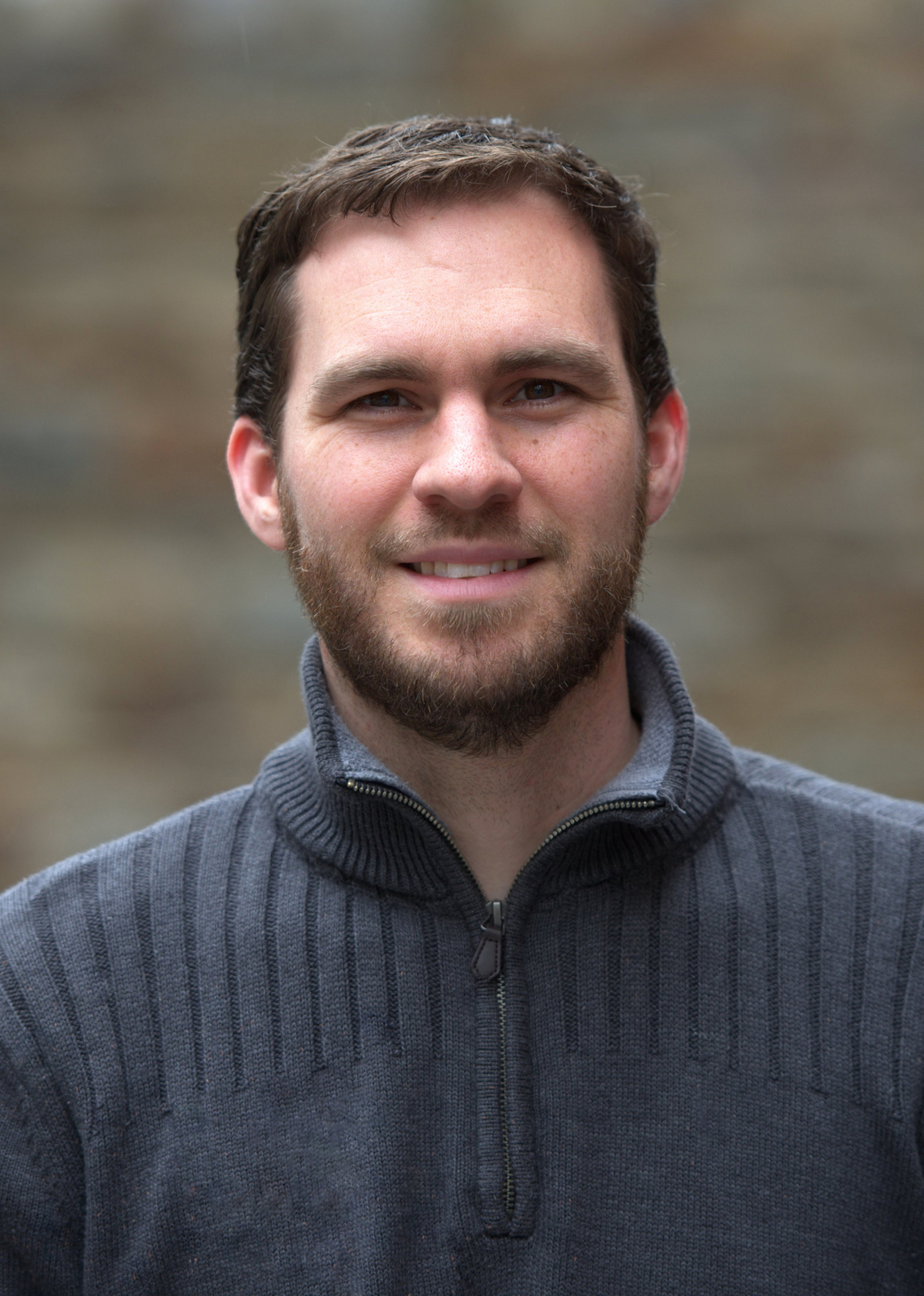

Background information
- Born: June 13, 1985 (age 40)
- Origin: Framingham, Massachusetts, United States
- Genres: Video game music; Contemporary classical music
- Occupations: Composer; Audio Engineer; Sound Designer
- Years active: 2003–present
- Website: Official website

Geoff Knorr (born June 13, 1985) is an American composer, orchestrator, and sound designer. He has worked on video game titles such as Civilization VII, Civilization VI, Civilization: Beyond Earth, Civilization V, Ara: History Untold, and Ashes of the Singularity.

Knorr was born in Framingham, Massachusetts and grew up in Marietta, Georgia. He took piano and cello lessons at a young age and he composed his first piece of music in eighth grade. He studied composition with Christopher Theofanidis and Michael Hersch and recording arts and sciences at the Peabody Institute of the Johns Hopkins University in Baltimore, Maryland.

Knorr first came to the attention of the Firaxis sound team when he did score preparation for the choir recording for Civilization IV: Beyond the Sword. He has since collaborated as a composer, orchestrator, and sound designer with Firaxis Games, Oxide Games, and Stardock.

Knorr's symphonic arrangements from Civilization V and VI are regularly performed by orchestras around the world as part of the touring Game ON! symphonic game music concerts, conducted by Andy Brick.

== Works ==
Title	Year	Developer	Notes
Civilization IV: Beyond the Sword	2007	Firaxis	Choir score preparation
Civilization V	2010	Firaxis	with Michael Curran
Elemental: Fallen Enchantress	2012	Stardock	with Mason Fisher
Civilization V: Gods & Kings	2012	Firaxis	with Michael Curran
Civilization V: Brave New World	2013	Firaxis	with Michael Curran
Haunted Hollow	2013	Firaxis	Music and sound design
At the Gates (video game)	2013	Conifer Games	Main menu music
Civilization: Beyond Earth	2014	Firaxis	Lead Composer. Additional music by Grant Kirkhope, Michael Curran, and Griffin Cohen
Civilization: Beyond Earth - Rising Tide	2015	Firaxis	Lead Composer. Additional music by Grant Kirkhope and Griffin Cohen
Galactic Civilizations III	2015	Stardock	with Michael Curran and Mason Fisher
Ashes of the Singularity	2016	Stardock	with Michael Curran and Richard Gibbs
Civilization VI	2016	Firaxis	with Roland Rizzo and Phill Boucher
Civilization VI: Rise and Fall	2018	Firaxis	with Roland Rizzo and Phill Boucher
Civilization VI: Gathering Storm	2019	Firaxis	with Roland Rizzo and Phill Boucher
Civilization VI: New Frontier Pass	2020-2021	Firaxis	with Roland Rizzo and Phill Boucher
Ara: History Untold	2024	Oxide Games	with Michael Curran and Jonathan Peros
Civilization VII	2025	Firaxis	with Roland Rizzo

== Awards and nominations ==
- ASCAP Morton Gould Young Composer Award, 2004
- NACUSA Young Composers Competition, Honorable Mention, 2007
- Salvatore Martirano Memorial Composition Award, Honorable Mention 2009
- Minnesota Orchestra Composer Institute, Participant, 2009

Year	Award	Title	Category	Result
2014	International Film Music Critics Association Award	Civilization: Beyond Earth	Best Original Score for a Video Game or Interactive Media	Won
2015	ASCAP 2015 Composers' Choice Award	Civilization: Beyond Earth	2014 Video Game Score of the Year	Nominated
2015	International Film Music Critics Association Award	Civilization: Beyond Earth - Rising Tide	Best Original Score for a Video Game or Interactive Media	Nominated
2016	ASCAP 2016 Composers' Choice Award	Civilization: Beyond Earth - Rising Tide	2015 Video Game Score of the Year	Nominated
2017	Game Audio Network Guild Awards	Civilization VI	Music of the Year	Nominated
2019	Game Audio Network Guild Awards	Civilization VI: Rise and Fall “Cree - The Atomic Era (The Drums of Poundmaker)"	Best Original Choral Composition	Nominated
2019	British Academy Games Awards (BAFTAs)	Civilization VI: Gathering Storm	Game Beyond Entertainment (entire development team)	Nominated
2020	Game Audio Network Guild Awards	Civilization VI: Gathering Storm	Best Original Soundtrack	Nominated
2020	Game Audio Network Guild Awards	Civilization VI: Gathering Storm “Maori - The Atomic Era”	Best Original Choral Composition	Nominated
