= Exis Interactive =

American video game developer

Exis LLC
- Type: Video game developer
- Industry: Video games
- Founded: 2003
- Headquarters: Towson, Maryland
- Number of employees: 4 (2006)
- Website: exisinteractive.com

Exis LLC is an American game developer that operates in Towson, Maryland and is sometimes referred to as Exis Interactive.

== Company history ==
Exis LLC was officially founded in 2003 but has roots going back as far as 1997. It is an indie game developer and outsource studio located in Towson, Maryland. Exis started when its founder, Peter Kojesta, took on various small art contracts while working part-time on an open world FPS named Poacher with a small group of colleagues and friends. Poacher was eventually shown at GDC in 2004 before being reworked and eventually canned in 2007 for various reasons. In the meantime however, Exis was forming multiple positive business relationships through successful contracts involving companies such as Large Animal Games, Khaeon and Blue Street Studios. In addition to conventional game development contracts, Exis also performed contracts for simulation companies such as General Dynamics and Northrop Grumman.

With the end of 2007 Exis began work on its first AAA contract for Day One Studios and LucasArts for their then upcoming title, Fracture. Though Fracture was released with limited critical acclaim Exis established itself as a legitimate solution for AAA art outsource with its successful and prompt completion of all assigned tasks. Following this period Exis, and much of the art outsource industry, experienced a large dry spell during the beginning of the 2008 financial crisis. This dry spell ended in 2009 with Exis taking up a large extended contract for the Day One Studios Shooter, F.E.A.R. 3. It was during this time that Exis took on a Hollywood model, with multiple artists on hand to grow and shrink the company to match the sometimes considerable workload.

Towards the end of this time Exis began work on another small independent title of its own, Majestic 12. Originally intended for the Microsoft's Dream-Build-Play, (the team liked the project enough to work on it full-time). Development on Majestic 12 continued steadily and in 2011 Exis brought Majestic 12 to GDC. At the conference Majestic 12 was received well enough for Exis to successfully negotiate a publishing deal for Xbox Live Arcade on the Xbox 360, though eventually released the game on the PC in late 2012.

== Past Projects ==
- General Dynamics: MDARS, TAC-C
- Northrop Grumman: STARLite, VIC-5

== List of recent titles worked on ==
- Fracture (2008)
- F.E.A.R. 3 (2011)
- XCOM: Enemy Unknown (2012)
- Majestic 12 (2012)
- BioShock Infinite (2013)
- Civilization V: Brave New World (2014)
- Civilization: Beyond Earth (2014)
- World of Tanks (2014)
- Civilization Beyond Earth: Rising Tide (2015)
- Sid Meier's Starships (2015)
- XCOM 2 (2015)
- Ashes of the Singularity (2015)
- Sins of a Solar Empire II (2024)
- Ara: History Untold (2024)
- Delta Force: Hawk Ops (2024)
- Dragonhold (2025)
- Aura (2026)
