= Civilization VI =

2016 video game

- Developer: Firaxis Games
- Publishers: 2K; Aspyr Media (Mobile/Switch)
- Designer: Ed Beach
- Artist: Brian Busatti
- Composer: Geoff Knorr
- Series: Civilization
- Platforms: Windows; macOS; Linux; iOS; Nintendo Switch; PlayStation 4; Xbox One; Android
- Release: October 21, 2016: Windows; October 21, 2016; macOS; October 24, 2016; Linux; February 9, 2017; iOS; December 21, 2017; Nintendo Switch; November 16, 2018; PlayStation 4, Xbox One; November 22, 2019; Android; August 13, 2020
- Genres: Turn-based strategy, 4X
- Modes: Single-player, multiplayer

Sid Meier's Civilization VI is a 2016 4X turn-based strategy video game developed by American company Firaxis Games and published by 2K. The mobile and Nintendo Switch ports were published by Aspyr Media. It is the sequel to Civilization V (2010), and was released on Windows and macOS in October 2016, with later ports for Linux in February 2017, iOS in December 2017, Nintendo Switch in November 2018, PlayStation 4 and Xbox One in November 2019, and Android in 2020.

Similar to previous installments, the goal for the player is to develop a civilization from an early settlement through many in-game millennia to become a world power and achieve one of several victory conditions, such as through military domination, technological superiority, or cultural influence over the other human and computer-controlled opponents. Players do this by exploring the world, founding new cities, building city improvements, deploying military troops to attack and defend themselves from others, researching new technologies and civic advancements, developing an influential culture, and engaging in trade and negotiations with other world leaders.

The game features several civilizations not featured in previous incarnations of Civilization, while many returning civilizations have new capitals or new leaders. A critical design focus was to avoid having the player follow a pre-set path of improvements towards their civilization which they had observed from earlier games. New to Civilization VI is the use of districts outside the city center to house most of the buildings. For example, a campus district must be built to house science-based buildings. Other new features include research on the game's technology tree based on nearby terrain, a similar technology tree for cultural improvements, and a better government civics structure for those playing on a cultural victory path. There are also new artificial intelligence mechanics for computer-controlled opponents, which include secret goals and randomized engagements to disrupt an otherwise stable game.

The game received generally positive reviews upon release, and it was awarded Best Strategy Game at The Game Awards 2016 and Strategy/Simulation Game of the Year at the 20th Annual D.I.C.E. Awards. The game received two major expansions, Rise and Fall (2018) and Gathering Storm (2019), as well as two season passes, the New Frontier Pass (2020–21) and the Leader Pass (2022·23).

The game was succeeded by the next entry in the series, Civilization VII, released in February 2025.

== Gameplay ==
Civilization VI is a turn-based strategy video game in which one or more players compete alongside computer-controlled AI opponents to grow their individual civilization from a small tribe to control the entire planet across several periods of development. This can be accomplished by achieving one of several victory conditions, all based on the 4X gameplay elements, "eXplore, eXpand, eXploit and eXterminate". Players manage a civilization of their choice and develop their technology, culture and government structure between ancient times and the near future. They found cities and grow them through the creation of mines, farms and other improvements, while simultaneously exploring the randomly generated world and encountering other civilizations and barbarians. Players have the ability to trade and manage peaceful diplomatic relations with other civilizations or alternatively go to war through the use of military force.

Similar to previous Civilization games, each civilization has a unique ability, comes with at least one unique unit (often one associated closely with the civilization in a historical sense, though not always with the leader), as well as unique infrastructure such as an improvement, building, or district. Each leader also has a unique ability which may provide an additional unique unit. One major change between Civilization V and Civilization VI is that both leaders and civilizations have a benefit.

The Aztecs, led by Montezuma I, was a pre-order DLC until becoming free to all players on January 19, 2017.

City improvements such as military installations are now built in separate tiles from the main city tile in Civilization VI. The game also uses an old-fashioned drawn map to illustrate tiles that are in the fog of war or have not been explored.

Civilization VI builds upon the general gameplay of Civilization V, including continuing the use of the hex-based grid introduced in Civilization V. New to Civilization VI is the idea of "city unstacking": some improvements to cities must be placed in the hexes in the bounds of the city but not within the city center itself, whereas in previous games, all improvements were considered stacked on the same map hex or square that the city was located in. The player must assign specific hexes as "districts" in the city, which have certain limitations but grant bonuses for improvements placed in that district.

For example, the encampment district specializes in a city for training military units, and allows for the construction of further buildings that grant production and experience bonuses to said units. Such encampments may not be placed next to the main city center. Other districts gain bonuses for being placed in appropriate terrain—campuses benefit greatly from being placed adjacent to mountain or rainforest hexes, reflecting scientific advancements from studying the diversity of species within such biomes. Players can opt to attack specific districts of a city instead of the city center, which can affect the city's operation. These districts may also add new strategies to the city's defense. For example, with a military encampment in place, attacking forces approaching a city are not only subject to ranged attacks from the city center, but also from the encampment. The attacking forces may need to take the encampment first before they can successfully strike the city center.

In order to reduce congestion on the map, players are able to perform a limited amount of unit stacking (a change from Civilization V), but are only able to stack similar unit types or symbiotic units. For example, a warrior unit can be assigned to a builder unit to protect that unit from barbarians in the early game, and a battering ram can stack with a spearman to take over cities. The game also made changes to the "types" of units available. Land combat units, previously split into "melee or ranged", now include anti-cavalry units such as spearmen and pikemen which received bonuses in combat against cavalry, but penalties when fighting against melee units. Similarly, cavalry units were split into light and heavy variants, with both having high movement, but severe negatives against districts and walls. Naval units also split into melee, ranged and raider types, and support units were added to give bonuses to certain types, such as battering rams letting melee units ignore walls, and medics letting units heal extra health per turn.

The game's technology tree, now known as the active research system, has also been modified to help boost technology research if the player has access to appropriate improvements or resources (e.g. building a quarry helps boost the research into masonry). Technologies based on access to water, such as sailing, would be limited if the player started in the middle of a continent. A new feature called Eureka Moments is able to increase the player's progress toward certain technologies after completing specific tasks; for example, destroying a barbarian encampment contributes to the military tradition technology.

Past iterations of the game were considered difficult to win if the player decided to pursue a Cultural victory. To balance the game toward Cultural victories, a new Civics tree is introduced. The Civics tree has transferred cultural improvements that were previously part of the Technology tree in earlier Civilization games into a separate mechanic. Culture gained from cities is used to build on the Civics tree in the same manner Science from cities builds up the Technology tree. Completing certain Civics will then unlock policies, or policy cards, for the player's government. In Civilization VI, the government is defined by placing appropriate and available policies into a number of slots divided among the Military, Economic, Diplomatic and Wildcard categories. The policies define boosts or limitations for the civilization (e.g. improved attack bonuses for military units against certain types of enemies such as Barbarians). Policies can be changed for free upon completing a single Civic, or for a small cost at any other time, allowing the player to adapt to a new situation as needed, according to lead producer Dennis Shirk.

More advanced cards, only obtainable through significant advancement in the Civics tree, can unlock improvements that give the player pursuing a Cultural victory advantages over other players, such as reducing the time or cost of producing new units. Various choices made by the player may cause unhappiness in their population as with previous games, but in Civilization VI, many of these were localized to the city affected by the choice rather than the entire population, further aiding towards Cultural victory-style players. The Religion system introduced in Civilization V's Gods & Kings expansion is built further upon in VI, featuring more units and improvements that can lead to interreligious conflicts.

AI opponents have new agendas that influence player interactions. Some of these agendas are unique to each leader, emulating notable historical events, respective personalities and policies. Each AI character also has a second hidden agenda, which can only be revealed through espionage.

== Development ==
The game was developed by the same Firaxis Games team that developed the expansions on Civilization V, and most of the new mechanics introduced in these were present in Civilization VI at its launch. This follows from Sid Meier's "33/33/33" rule of sequel design: 33% of the game should retain established systems, 33% should feature improved systems over the previous version, and the remaining 33% should feature new material. Firaxis used "Frankenstein", a small group of dedicated Firaxis fans, to bounce ideas for gameplay improvements. Because of the larger number of systems in place, the studio expected to ship the game with a large-scale tutorial, separate but supplementing the guidance given by the player's various in-game advisors.

A major foundation of the development of Civilization VI was to prevent players from following routines in playing through a game, according to lead designer Ed Beach. The developers placed much more emphasis on the significance of the procedurally generated map in how it would influence the player's strategy as the game progressed, so that no game of Civilization VI would be the same. For example, the redesigned technology tree was aimed to pull players away from automatically following a rote path through the tree, and instead adapt a path through it based on their placement on the map.

Modifications to the game such as the unstacking of cities and city districts lead directly to support this approach, since some districts and city improvements depend specifically on what available terrain is nearby. Such changes were also the result of design choices made by Civilization V's lead designer Jon Shafer during its development, such as the unstacking of player units. These changes in Civilization V exposed other weak areas of the core gameplay of the series, specifically how cities were simply seen as places to dump improvements and Wonders with little effect on the map, according to producer Dennis Shirk.

Beach, as lead designer for Civilization VI, wanted to improve upon these weaknesses, desiring to make the game map "just as important as anything else in the game", and took the step to unstack the cities to accomplish this, following in how Schafer took to unstack unit tiles in Civilization V. According to Beach, these features add city management elements similar to those found in city-building games, and force players to make decisions based on the geographical location of the city, instead of sticking to a specific city improvement route.

Because of the importance of the surrounding terrain to the growth of a city, Firaxis had to review their procedural generation for game maps to meet this new approach. Beach noted that early testing with the unstacked cities on archipelagos generated by their older system made gameplay nearly impossible, and that with mountains becoming a valuable resource towards city expansion, test players would restart maps built on the old map generation system to get the right placement of mountains to exploit them successfully. The new map generation system attempts to spread out terrain more, and in areas where one type of important terrain may be absent, makes up for this by including other valuable terrain spaces, such as a river-rich region where there is a lack of mountains.

Senior gameplay designer Anton Strenger compared their approach towards the development of the computer opponents, with main and hidden agendas, similar to concepts they had used in Rising Tide expansion for Civilization: Beyond Earth. They selected historical leaders to span a diverse range of faction and play style dynamics, while also looking for figures that had "really interesting personalities" that they could fit these agendas into. Beach previously designed a system in the Civilization V: Brave New World expansion that gave a "Mayhem level" in the computer opponents. Internally, the game tracked how much action was going on for the players, and if it determined that the player was progressing without little change, the computer would cause one or more of its controlled opponents to make erratic moves, creating a new situation for the player to deal with. The Mayhem level was used in Civilization VI, as according to Shirk, it is a "really interesting way of making sure that there's always something that's going to pull the player away from what they're doing or what they're focused on all the time". Whereas the process of tuning this for Brave New World required manual playthroughs of the game, Firaxis had set up several computers in their offices to run Civilization VI, using only computer-controlled opponents; the results and behaviors of these games were reviewed by the part of the team dedicated to the artificial intelligence systems and used to balance the Mayhem level.

The game was developed with a new engine that is expected to be more friendly to modification. The game's visuals were inspired by the Age of Exploration. User-interface elements feature elements like compasses and astrolabes. The fog of war is rendered using a cross-hatch drawing style to replicate old maps from the Age of Exploration. The developers planned to bring back the movies they had shown players upon completion of a Wonder from Civilization IV, but are now rendered in the game, and as to make the final shot of the Wonder more impressive, they developed a day-night cycle that continues on in the game. While this cycle does not affect the core gameplay, art director Brian Busatti anticipates that this feature could be used by modders to create new tactical considerations.

The game uses a more cartoonish look than those of Civilization V, as according to Firaxis, with much deeper gameplay, they wanted to keep the visuals simple to avoid interfering with the complexity of gameplay. The graphics of individual units and buildings are being developed to be both readily detailed when viewed in a tight zoom, while still being recognizable from other similar units when viewed from a distance. This necessitated the simpler art style to allow players to quickly recognize units and buildings while looking over a city without having to resort to user interface tooltips or similar distractions, according to Shirk. Individual units were designed to include flair associated with the given civilization, such as applying different helmet styles to the same class of footsoldier units.

Composer Christopher Tin, who wrote "Baba Yetu", the Grammy-winning theme song for Civilization IV, returned to write Civilization VI's main theme, "Sogno di Volare" (translated as "The Dream of Flight"). The theme was written to capture the spirit of exploration not only in "seeking new lands, but also the mental exploration of expanding the frontiers of science and philosophy". Tin premiered the song at a London concert in July 2016. The game's original score was written and orchestrated primarily by Geoff Knorr, who was assisted by Roland Rizzo, Griffin Cohen and Phill Boucher. Each civilization features a musical theme or "core melody" with four variations that follow the era that the civilization is currently in.

Sean Bean, who narrated the early trailers of the game, also provided his voicework for quotes read to the player as they progress along the technology and civics tree.

In January 2017, the Firaxis team affirmed that they were still working on updates to include multiplayer support, user-created modifications and support for Steam Workshop.

=== Ports ===
Civilization VI was released for Windows on October 21, 2016. The macOS version, developed by Aspyr Media, was released on October 24, 2016. At that time, Aspyr had been evaluating the feasibility of porting the title to Linux operating systems due to a large number of requests from players, and announced in January 2017 that they planned to go ahead and complete the Linux port, which was eventually released in February 2017.

A version for iPad was released in December 2017, while a general iOS version (supporting iPhones) was released on October 4, 2018. The Rise & Fall expansion was released for iOS on July 24, 2019, while Gathering Storm was released on November 22, 2019.

A port for the Nintendo Switch was announced in September 2018 and was released on November 16, 2018. Cloud saves were added in April 2019 for both Windows and Switch versions through linking of a player's Steam and 2K accounts, though only supported saved games from the base game at that point due to the lack of the expansions on the Switch. Both Rise & Fall and Gathering Storm expansions were available as an expansion bundle for the Switch version on November 22, 2019.

PlayStation 4 and Xbox One ports were announced in September 2019. Both were released on November 22, 2019, alongside the Rise and Fall and Gathering Storm expansions as separate and bundled downloadable content.

A version for Android was released on August 13, 2020.

== Downloadable content ==
DLC timeline
2017	Poland Civilization and Scenario Pack
2017	Vikings Scenario Pack
2017	Australia Civilization and Scenario Pack
2017	Persia and Macedon Civilization and Scenario Pack
2017	Nubia Civilization and Scenario Pack
2017	Khmer and Indonesia Civilization and Scenario Pack
2018	Rise and Fall
2019	Gathering Storm
2020	New Frontier Pass
2021
2022	Leader Pass

=== Additional content ===
In 2017, six individual civilization and scenario packs were added to the game. The Poland Civilization and Scenario Pack adds the Polish civilization led by Jadwiga and the "Jadwiga's Legacy" scenario. The Vikings Scenario Pack added the "Vikings, Traders, and Raiders!" scenario, as well as new city states. The Australia Civilization and Scenario Pack adds the Australian civilization led by John Curtin and the "Outback Tycoon" scenario. The Persia and Macedon Civilization and Scenario Pack added the Persia civilization led by Cyrus, the Macedon civilization led by Alexander, and the "Conquests of Alexander" scenario. The Nubia Civilization and Scenario Pack adds the Nubia civilization led by Amanitore and the "Gifts of the Nile" scenario. The Khmer and Indonesia Civilization and Scenario Pack adds the Khmer civilization led by Jayavarman VII, the Indonesian civilization led by Dyah Gitarja, and the "Path to Nirvana" scenario.

=== Rise and Fall ===
The first expansion, Rise and Fall, was released on February 8, 2018, and brought the concepts of the rise and fall of civilizations. The cities have loyalty; if the loyalty level falls too low, the city becomes a free city and may join other civilizations. A civilization has the potential to enter into a Golden Age by completing certain milestones, and can choose a special bonus in that age, but if the player does not maintain certain milestones afterwards, the civilization could fall into a Dark Age, affecting loyalty. In a Dark Age, the player can choose to implement powerful Dark Age policies, but they have a cost. If the player gets a Dark Age followed by a golden age, instead of getting a golden age, they get a Heroic Age, with the right to choose three bonuses. The expansion also adds governors, who increase the loyalty of cities and award a special bonus to that city. By promoting governors, players add another bonus.

=== Gathering Storm ===
The game's second major expansion, Gathering Storm, was announced in November 2018 and was released on February 14, 2019. The expansion added, among other features, impacts from natural disasters like floods, volcanoes and droughts that affect gameplay. Additionally, a new climate system was added to track climate change throughout the player's game, with the potential for additional environmental effects to result from this. Existing civilizations and leaders were rebalanced to reflect these new gameplay additions respective to each civilization's historical past, such as Egypt being able to take advantage of river flooding for improved food production. The game also re-introduced the Diplomatic victory type, which last appeared in Civilization V.

=== Red Death ===
A free update to the game released in September 2019 added a new multiplayer game mode called "Red Death". This mode is comparable to battle royale games for up to twelve players. Taking place on a post-apocalyptic world, each player controls one civilian unit and multiple offensive units that must protect the civilian unit from the other players, while at the same time, keeping the civilian unit out of range of an expanding "red death" zone that eventually covers the world map. Meanwhile, these units can also scout the wasteland for resources that help to improve the supporting units. The mode was the result of an April Fools' joke by Bradley Olson, the lead multiplayer gameplay designer, who secretly added the basics of the mode on April 1. Once the mode was discovered, the project team found the mode to be fun and expanded the idea.

=== New Frontier Pass ===
Firaxis announced in May 2020 a "New Frontier Pass" season pass for the game, consisting of six downloadable content packs, each to be released every two months from May until March 2021. A total of nine new leaders and eight new civilizations were added through the six packs, as well as new gameplay modes and additional features such as new wonders and buildings. There were also additional free updates to the game for all players along with these content packs. All told, despite the difference in delivery, the amount of content in the complete New Frontier Pass is comparable to an additional expansion pack.

The first pack featured the Maya and Gran Colombian civilizations, led by Lady Six Sky and Simón Bolívar, respectively. The expansion also introduced a new game mode titled "Apocalypse". In the Apocalypse game mode, natural disasters happen much more frequently. Once the world's climate change level reaches a maximum, the world enters an apocalypse state, causing an even further increase to severe natural disasters and meteor strikes.

The second pack featured the Ethiopian civilization, led by Menelik II, along with alternative costumes for Catherine de Medici and Teddy Roosevelt with different abilities; a new district called the Diplomatic Quarter, which gives improvements on diplomacy and espionage; and the "Secret Societies" mode, which allows players to join one of four available secret societies, each with a different hidden agenda, including exclusive traits.

The third pack introduced the Byzantine and Gaulish civilizations, led by Basil II and Ambiorix, respectively; a new map called "Highlands"; and two new world wonders—the Biosphere and Statue of Zeus. The new "Dramatic Ages" mode abolishes the Normal and Heroic Ages and ensures that players can only enter in Golden or Dark Ages each era, with increased bonuses for the Golden Ages and harsher penalties for Dark Ages, including the possibility of some cities seceding from the empire. In addition, Dedications are also removed from this mode, and instead are replaced by Golden and Dark Age policies that can be slotted in the current government. As compensation for these changes, Era Score can now be earned when discovering new technologies or civics, or through promoting military units (after the unit's first promotion), in addition to the usual Historic Moments, and any extra Era Score acquired beyond what is necessary to earn a Golden Age is converted to extra loyalty pressure during the next era.

The fourth pack introduced the Babylonian civilization, led by Hammurabi; six new city-states with unique bonuses; 24 new Great People; and the "Heroes and Legends" mode, which introduces the heroes, special units with exclusive and powerful perks based on legendary characters from myth and history that can be recruited after being discovered by completing a special project.

The fifth pack introduced the Vietnamese civilization, led by Lady Triệu; Kublai Khan, who is an alternative leader for both Mongolian and Chinese civilizations; the Preserve district, which has no yield at all but gives bonuses to nearby tiles; and the "Monopolies and Corporations" mode, which allows players to make use of excess luxury resources to improve cities and provides other bonuses should they manage to monopolize them.

The sixth and final pack introduced the Portuguese civilization, led by João III; two new wonders—the Belém Tower and the Etemenanki; a new map called "Wetlands"; and the "Zombie Defense" mode, which includes zombies, units that occasionally spawn on the map and attack other units, turning them into other zombies after killing them. The mode also includes unique elements that can allow a player to better defend against zombies or use them against other players.

=== Leader Pass ===
On November 14, 2022, Firaxis posted a tweet regarding an announcement for a new DLC the following day. The next day, the "Leader Pass" was announced, containing 12 new leaders and 6 new "personas", alternate versions of existing leaders. This pass would release monthly, starting on November 21, 2022, and concluding in March 2023. Each pack contains one or two new leaders and personas. The first pack, Great Negotiators, contains Abraham Lincoln of America and Nzinga Mbande of the Kongolese, and a persona for Saladin. Later packs featured Elizabeth of England, Ramses of Egypt, Yongle and Wu Zetian of China, Sejong of Korea, Sundiata Keita of Mali, Ludwig II of Germany, Nader Shah of Persia, Theodora of Byzantium and Tokugawa of Japan; as well as personas for Qin Shi Huang, Cleopatra, Suleiman, Harald Hardrada and Victoria. On November 17, it was announced that Julius Caesar would lead Rome, being a free leader released on November 21, obtained by linking a 2K Games account to Civilization VI.

== Reception ==
Reception

Aggregate score
Aggregator	Score
Metacritic	PC: 88/100; NS: 86/100; PS4: 87/100; XONE: 86/100 iOS: 92/100

Review scores
Publication	Score
Destructoid	8.5/10
Game Informer	9.5/10
GameRevolution	4.5/5
GameSpot	9/10
IGN	9.4/10
PC Gamer (US)	93/100
Polygon	8.5/10
TouchArcade	5/5

Civilization VI received "generally favorable" reviews, according to review aggregator platform Metacritic. Scott Butterworth from GameSpot praised the game's nuanced additions and the unstacking of cities, which "adds a new strategic layer that fills a gap and creates greater variety in the types of thinking Civ demands". IGN's Dan Stapleton echoed the same love for its "overwhelming number of systems" and for feeling "like a Civ game that's already had two expansions".

Peter Glagowski from Destructoid was slightly more critical, dubbing the religious victory condition in the game a "nuisance" and recommending turning it off. He also lamented the lack of scenarios, the scrapping of the diplomatic victory condition (which would eventually be reintroduced in Gathering Storm), and the absence of Steam Workshop support at launch.

The game shipped more than one million units in its first two weeks of release, making it the fastest-selling game in the Civilization series to date. By May 2017, the game had sold more than two million copies, contributing significantly to publisher Take Two's 2017 financial year, in which they reported revenues of $576.1 million. Take Two stated that Civilization VI was on track to surpass Civilization V's lifetime sales of eight million copies. By 2019, the game had sold 5.5 million units, and by 2023, the total sales of the game were reported at over 11 million, making it the best-selling game in the series.

The game won the Best PC Game and Best Strategy Game awards at the 2016 Game Critics Awards, as well as the Best Strategy Game at The Game Awards 2016 and the National Academy of Video Game Trade Reviewers. During the 20th Annual D.I.C.E. Awards, the Academy of Interactive Arts & Sciences awarded Civilization VI with Strategy/Simulation Game of the Year.

=== Analytics data ===
The game originally shipped with the advertisement tracking and analytics software Red Shell, but this was removed in the midst of other gaming studios removing it from their games, and wider player complaints, some of whom characterized the software as spyware.

== Other media ==
In August 2017, Fantasy Flight Games announced that they would be publishing Civilization: A New Dawn, a board game building upon their 2010 release Civilization: The Board Game, incorporating new mechanics and features based on Civilization VI. It was published in 2017. An expansion pack to the game, called Terra Incognita, was released in October 2020. The expansion introduces additional features from the video game, including more civilizations and districts.
