= Siege of Centauri =

2019 video game

- Developer: Stardock Entertainment
- Publisher: Stardock Entertainment
- Platform: Microsoft Windows
- Release: September 12, 2019
- Genre: Tower defense
- Modes: Single-player, multiplayer

Siege of Centauri is a tower defense video game by Stardock for Microsoft Windows. It takes place in the same universe as Ashes of the Singularity, a game developed by Oxide Games and published by Stardock. The game was released on September 12, 2019, earning mixed reviews as a standard implementation of the tower defense genre.

== Gameplay ==
Siege of Centauri is a tower defense video game where players must defend colonies from endless hordes of killer machines. The game takes place in the same universe as Ashes of the Singularity, a game developed by Oxide Games and published by Stardock. Different from most other tower defense games where players position their defenses on designated pedestals, players can drop turrets anywhere within a preset area. Different weapons have different advantages against different enemies, and defeating each level rewards the player with access to new weapons.

== Development ==
The was in Steam Early Access.

== Reception ==
Reception

Aggregate score
Aggregator	Score
Metacritic	68/100

Upon its release on September 12, 2019, Siege of Centauri received an average score of 68 on review aggregator Metacritic, indicating "mixed or average" reviews. Kyle Hilliard of PC Gamer described the game as "a basic tower defense game with many concepts I have used before and it did little to get me excited about what was coming next." Ollie Toms of Rock Paper Shotgun found the game enjoyable, while calling it “one of the most uninspired games I’ve ever played”. While Jordan Boyrd of Screen Rant said that it "isn't a groundbreaking game," they also said it "does its job in doing justice to that niche despite a lackluster story and some technical issues".
