= Exis =

Exis may refer to:

- Exis Interactive, a game studio
- Exi (subculture), a youth movement in Hamburg, Germany, in the 1950s
  - The Exies, a band named after the movement (more specifically, from a quote in a John Lennon book that mentioned the movement)
- Exis, the debut EP of Drake's new OVO Sound labelmate, Roy Woods

== See also ==
- Exi (disambiguation)
