= EXY =

EXY or Exy can refer to:

== People and fictional characters ==
- Exy (born 1995), a South Korean rapper, singer-songwriter, and actress
- Exy Johnson (1909–2004), an American author and sailor
- EXY, a fictional character in the video game DoDonPachi DaiOuJou
- Exy Bonuan, a person who won the 2016 vice mayoralty election for Lian, the Philippines; see 2016 Batangas local elections

== Companies and organizations ==
- Congo Express, a regional airline based in the Democratic Republic of the Congo from 2010 to 2015, by ICAO code
- South African Express, a regional airline based in South Africa from 1994 to 2020, by ICAO code
- Sigma Chi Upsilon, a fraternity which had Seamus McDonagh (boxer) as a member

== Other uses ==
- Euro Currency Index, an index that measures the relative strength or weakness of the euro
- Exy Johnson (ship), a ship named in honor of the sailor, launched in 2002 and based in Los Angeles, California, U.S.

== See also ==
- Exi (disambiguation)
