= C3C =

"C3C" is an abbreviation that can stand for:

- Cadet Third Class, the rank of a cadet in their second (sophomore) year at the United States Air Force Academy
- Civilization III: Conquests, an expansion for the computer game Civilization III
