= Jon Shafer =

American video game designer (born 1985)

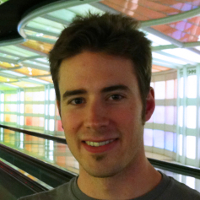
- Jon Shafer in 2012
- Born: March 30, 1985 (age 41); Aurora, Colorado, United States
- Education: Towson University
- Occupations: Game designer, game programmer, producer, entrepreneur
- Years active: 2005–present
- Known for: Civilization V, At the Gates

Jon Shafer is an American designer and programmer of video games. He was the lead designer of the strategy game Civilization V, developed by Firaxis.

Shafer is the president of Conifer Games, a video game development company he founded in 2012. The studio's first title is At the Gates, a 4X strategy game similar to Civilization in which players command a barbarian kingdom with the goal of defeating both rival tribes and the waning Roman Empire. The budget for developing At the Gates is primarily made up of funds raised through a Kickstarter campaign held in February 2013.

== Life and career ==
Shafer was born and grew up in Aurora, Colorado. He learned to program when he was 8 years old from his father. As a child he cultivated a passion for history.

These interests led Shafer to Sid Meier's Civilization series. He developed fan mods for Civilization III while in high school, and became a beta tester for the Civilization III expansion pack, Conquests, and Civilization IV. Early in Civilization IV's development he wrote an extensive guide explaining how to utilize its Python scripting language, and this led to him joining Firaxis for a programming internship in February 2005. Shafer was later hired full-time, and served as a designer and programmer on the two Civilization IV expansions, Warlords and Beyond the Sword.

Following the completion of Beyond the Sword, Shafer was named the lead designer and principal gameplay programmer for Civilization V, the next full title in the series. While in this role, Shafer drew from his past modding experience and from computer games he had played as a child, most notably Panzer General.

In January 2011, Shafer joined Stardock to lead an unannounced game project and assist with development on the Elemental series. In February 2013, he announced that he had left Stardock and founded Conifer Games, and was developing a new 4X title, At the Gates.

In June 2017, Shafer joined Paradox Development Studio as a game director on an unannounced project, only to part ways in November of the same year, citing creative differences.

Shafer attended Colorado State University from 2002–2005, studying history and computer science. After acquiring a position at Firaxis he left Colorado State but later completed his undergraduate study at Towson University in 2006 with a BS in History.
