= Exi =

Exi or EXI has several meanings including:

- Exi (subculture)
- Excursion Inlet Seaplane Base, in Alaska, United States
- Efficient XML Interchange
- EXI Wireless
- Exillon Energy
- Toyota EX-I

== See also ==
- EXID – South-Korean girl group
- Exis (disambiguation)
- Exy – South Korean rapper, singer and songwriter
