= Civilization VII =

2025 video game

- Developer: Firaxis Games
- Publisher: 2K
- Director: Ed Beach
- Producer: Andrew Frederiksen
- Designer: Ed Beach
- Programmers: Ken Gray; Michael Springer
- Artist: Jason Johnson
- Writers: Cat Manning; Benjamin Reeves; Emma Kidwell; Nell Raban; Rue Taylor
- Composers: Geoff Knorr; Roland Rizzo; Christopher Tin
- Series: Civilization
- Platforms: Linux; macOS; Nintendo Switch; PlayStation 4; PlayStation 5; Windows; Xbox One; Xbox Series X/S; Nintendo Switch 2; iOS; tvOS; visionOS
- Release: February 11, 2025; Nintendo Switch 2 June 5, 2025 iOS, tvOS, visionOS; February 5, 2026
- Genres: Turn-based strategy, 4X
- Modes: Single-player, multiplayer

Sid Meier's Civilization VII is a 4X turn-based strategy video game developed by Firaxis Games and published by 2K. The game was released on February 11, 2025, for Linux, macOS, Nintendo Switch, PlayStation 4, PlayStation 5, Windows, Xbox One, and Xbox Series X/S. It was released on June 5, 2025 for Nintendo Switch 2, and on iOS, macOS, tvOS and visionOS via Apple Arcade on February 5, 2026.

Similar to previous installments, the goal for the player is to develop a civilization from an early settlement through many in-game millennia to become a world power and achieve one of several victory conditions, such as through military domination, technological superiority, economic prowess, or cultural influence over the other human and computer-controlled opponents. Players do this by exploring the world, founding new cities, building city improvements, deploying military troops to attack and defend themselves from others, researching new technologies and civics advancements, developing an influential culture, and engaging in trade and negotiations with other world leaders. A significant change from previous iterations of the game was the introduction of an ages system to break up gameplay with different civilizations for each era.

Reception to the game was mostly positive, though more divisive than previous entries in the series. It received praise for its visuals, music, and some of its new gameplay systems such as its changes to diplomacy and economy; its user interface was highly criticized, however, with critics noting that very little information is readily explained to the player. Some gameplay systems received criticism as well, specifically the ages system due to it separating different civilizations into different eras rather than allowing a player to play as the same civilization throughout an entire campaign. Firaxis has since released numerous updates to address critiques, with the most major update to date being the "Test of Time" update, which released on May 19, 2026; Firaxis has expressed that it will address one of the game's most common criticisms by allowing players to play as one civilization throughout a campaign.

== Gameplay ==
Civilization VII introduces navigable rivers, allowing ships to travel to inland towns and cities.

Civilization VII is a 4X turn-based strategy game. The player oversees the growth of a human civilization from its earliest settlements to advanced society. The player uses various military and civilian units to explore the map, grow their civilization through the founding of additional settlements, advance their civilization's culture and technology, utilize surrounding resources, and contend or collaborate with competing civilizations. Multiple victory conditions are available to the player, including military, scientific, cultural, and economic avenues.

Civilization VII allows the player to select leaders and civilizations independently, with civilizations favoring leaders with certain attributes. The criteria for what constitutes a "leader" have also been updated, now including philosophers, religious figures, and scientists who were not heads of state. The historical era system is simplified into the antiquity, exploration, and modern ages, in comparison to the further divisions implemented by the game's predecessors. During all ages, independent factions—deliberately labeled to prevent perceived negative connotations of the term "barbarian" used in previous games in the series—emerge. Depending on how the player chooses to interact with them, these may evolve to become city states. Towards the end of the antiquity and exploration ages, players are faced with "crisis events" which simulate societal disruption and civilization downfall. Upon the conclusion of these ages, the player must choose whether to choose a new civilization with which to begin the next age or keep playing as the civilization they already selected.

== Development ==
In February 2023, Firaxis Games announced it was developing a sequel to Civilization VI (2016). PCGamesN reported in August 2021 that Firaxis had posted a job opening for a narrative lead for the game. Gwendoline Christie narrates the game's voiceovers.

Firaxis Games collaborated with members of the Shawnee Tribe, including Shawnee chief Benjamin Barnes, to create a historically accurate depiction of Tecumseh in the game. Tecumseh is voiced by Dean Dillon, a Shawnee voice actor. As part of the partnership between Firaxis Games and the Shawnee Tribe, Firaxis and 2K donated hundreds of thousands of dollars to programs working to revitalize the Shawnee language.

Civilization VII's opening cinematic "Rediscover Hope" and theme song "Live Gloriously" were revealed at the 2024 Game Awards. "Live Gloriously" is written by American composer Christopher Tin, who also composed the Grammy Award-winning song "Baba Yetu", the main theme of Civilization IV, as well as Civilization VI's main theme "Sogno di Volare". The song's lyrics are derived from four ancient poems—the Iliad, Beowulf, Popol Vuh, and Ramayana—which are sung in their languages as originally written. The game's original score was composed, arranged, and produced by Geoff Knorr and Roland Rizzo. It features performances by ensembles and musicians from around the world, including the FILMharmonic Orchestra Prague, Mongolian State Morin Khuur Ensemble, Ensemble I Fedeli, Southern Pine Drum Group, Wong Pleng Khmer, among many soloists.

=== Release ===
Civilization VII was announced at the Summer Game Fest on June 7, 2024. 2K previously announced it would appear at Summer Game Fest in May to reveal the "next iteration in one of its biggest and most beloved franchises". Hours before the presentation, the game was unintentionally announced on 2K's website. Civilization VII was released for Windows, macOS, Nintendo Switch, PlayStation 4, PlayStation 5, Xbox One, Steam Deck, and Xbox Series X/S on February 11, 2025. It was also released for the Nintendo Switch 2 as a launch title on June 5, 2025. A virtual reality (VR)/augmented reality (AR) version of Civilization VII was released on April 9, 2025, for the Meta Quest 3 and 3S. This version was developed by PlaySide Studios. On February 5, 2026, a feature-limited, DLC-free edition of Civilization VII became available on Apple Arcade for iPhone, iPad, and Mac.

=== Updates ===
Firaxis Games released several patches for Civilization VII, which included improvements to user interface and AI. In May 2026, Firaxis released the 1.4 “Test of Time” update, which allows players to play as one single civilization throughout the game's campaign. Until July 2026, three DLC collections with 9 new civilizations were released: “Crossroads of the World”, “Right to Rule” and “Brush & Blade”.

In 2027, Firaxis will release a new update for the game titled "Arc of Tomorrow". It will add the Atomic Age to the game, extending its timeline to the year 2050. The first expansion, titled Earthrise, which adds new gameplay mechanics surrounding space exploration, will also be released in 2027.

== Reception ==
Reception

Aggregate scores
Aggregator	Score
Metacritic	Win: 79/100
OpenCritic	77% recommend

Review scores
Publication	Score
Destructoid	9/10
Digital Trends	4/5
Eurogamer	2/5
GameSpot	8/10
GamesRadar+	4/5
IGN	7/10
PCGamesN	7/10
Shacknews	9/10
TechRadar	4/5
The Guardian	5/5
Video Games Chronicle	5/5
VG247	4/5

Civilization VII received "generally favorable" reviews from critics, according to the review aggregator website Metacritic. OpenCritic determined that 77% of critics recommend the game.

The game's visuals and sounds and diplomacy system overhaul were mostly praised. However, many critics found the UI lacking, the mechanics oversimplified, and the three ages system, coupled with the ability to change civilizations, divisive. Other points of criticism included the perceived premature end of the technology tree (roughly the 1960s) and the overreliance on DLC to fix or add lacking features.

Player reviews were less positive, with Civilization VII receiving Mixed reviews on Steam from advanced access players shortly before its full release. Months after the game's release, Civilization VII maintained a Mixed rating on Steam, with only 48% of players recommending the game, with the most heavy criticism being aimed at the abruptness of the ages system and the immersion breaking of changing civilizations.

=== Sales ===
Civilization VII reached more than 80,000 concurrent players on Steam during its launch week. However, the two previous entries of the series surpassed Civilization VII in active players in April 2025. In May 2025, concurrent players for the game dropped below 5,000 for the first time. In August 2025, Take-Two Interactive's CEO Strauss Zelnick described the game's initial sales as "slow" but expressed optimism about its long-term sales potential.

=== Accolades ===
Civilization VII was nominated for "Best Sim/Strategy Game" at the Game Awards 2025, but lost to Final Fantasy Tactics: The Ivalice Chronicles.

Year	Award	Category	Result	Ref.
2025	The Game Awards 2025	Best Sim/Strategy Game	Nominated	
2026	24th Game Audio Network Guild Awards	Music of the Year	Nominated	
2026	24th Game Audio Network Guild Awards	Best Main Theme	Nominated	
2026	24th Game Audio Network Guild Awards	Best Original Soundtrack Album	Nominated	
2026	24th Game Audio Network Guild Awards	Best UI, Reward, or Objective Sound Design	Nominated	
2026	24th Game Audio Network Guild Awards	Best Game Foley	Nominated	
2026	24th Game Audio Network Guild Awards	Best Game Trailer Audio	Nominated	
2026	NAVGTR Awards	Best Game, Strategy	Won	
2026	NAVGTR Awards	Best Gameplay Design, Franchise	Nominated	
2026	NAVGTR Awards	Best Song, Original or Adapted	Nominated	
2026	Apple Design Awards	Inclusivity	Pending	
