= Sid Meier's Ace Patrol: Pacific Skies =

2013 video game

- Developer: Firaxis Games
- Publisher: 2K Games
- Platforms: Microsoft Windows, iOS
- Release: Windows; November 5, 2013 iOS; November 7, 2013
- Genre: Combat flight simulation

Sid Meier's Ace Patrol: Pacific Skies is a WWII combat flight simulation game developed by Firaxis Games and published by 2K Games for Microsoft Windows (Steam) and iOS in 2013. It is the sequel to Sid Meier's Ace Patrol.

== Reception ==
Reception

Aggregate score
Aggregator	Score
Metacritic	(iOS) 82/100 (PC) 59/100

Review scores
Publication	Score
MacLife	(iOS) 4/5
PC Gamer (UK)	(PC) 42%
Pocket Gamer	(iOS) 4.5/5
TouchArcade	(iOS) 4/5
Digital Spy	(iOS) 4/5

The iOS version received "favorable" reviews, while the PC version received "mixed" reviews, according to the review aggregation website Metacritic.
