= Haunted Hollow =

2013 video game

- Developer: Firaxis Games
- Publisher: 2K
- Platform: iOS
- Release: May 2, 2013
- Genre: Turn-based strategy
- Mode: Single-player

Haunted Hollow is a turn-based strategy game, developed by Firaxis Games and published by 2K for iOS. It originally briefly made its appearance on April 23, 2013, before it was pulled from the iOS App Store. 2K Games commented in a statement: "Some of our fans may have noticed our latest mobile title, Haunted Hollow, pre-maturely appearing on the App Store this morning as a result of a testing error. We have removed this build to add a few final updates, so the game can be as polished as possible when it launches globally. But fans won't have to wait long – Haunted Hollow will be available for free to download from the App Store next Thursday, May 2, 2013!"

== Reception ==
Reception

Aggregate score
Aggregator	Score
Metacritic	72/100

Review scores
Publication	Score
Destructoid	7.5/10
Edge	6/10
Game Informer	6.75/10
Gamezebo	3.5/5
Hyper	7/10
MacLife	4/5
Pocket Gamer	3/5
TouchArcade	4/5
Digital Spy	2/5
Metro	7/10

The game received "mixed or average reviews" according to the review aggregation website Metacritic.
