= Sid Meier's Ace Patrol =

2013 video game

- Developer: Firaxis Games
- Publisher: 2K
- Platforms: iOS, Microsoft Windows
- Release: iOS; May 9, 2013; Windows; August 27, 2013
- Genre: Combat flight simulation

Sid Meier's Ace Patrol is a WWI combat flight simulation game developed by Firaxis Games and published by 2K for iOS and Microsoft Windows (Steam) in 2013.

A sequel called Sid Meier's Ace Patrol: Pacific Skies was released in November 2013.

== Reception ==
Reception

Aggregate score
Aggregator	Score	
Aggregator	iOS	PC
Metacritic	80/100	71/100

Review scores
Publication	Score	
Publication	iOS	PC
4Players	(iPad) 59% (iPhone) 49%	67%
Game Informer	7/10	N/A
GamesMaster	70%	N/A
Gamezebo	4.5/5	N/A
IGN	8.2/10	7.9/10
Joystiq	4.5/5	N/A
MacLife	4/5	N/A
Pocket Gamer	4.5/5	N/A
TouchArcade	5/5	N/A
Digital Spy	4/5	N/A
National Post	8/10	N/A

The iOS version received "generally favorable" reviews, while the PC version received "mixed or average reviews" according to the review aggregation website Metacritic.

Metro gave the iOS version a score of nine out of ten, calling it "A truly great portable strategy game that's original, accessible, and addictive. And for once the microtransactions benefit the player as well as the publisher." Digital Spy gave it a score of four stars out of five, saying, "Give the free levels a try, and you will have a hard time not downloading the additional campaigns right away." National Post gave it a similar score of eight out of ten, saying, "Mr. Meier has come up with a smart and innovative game of turn-based tactics for gamers on the go. Now it's your job to be a smart consumer and show him what you're willing to pay for – as well as what you're not." Common Sense Media gave it four stars out of five, saying, "Overall there's very little for strategy fans to complain about here, and people new to the genre will quickly see why it's so addictive."
