= Civilization III: Play the World =

- Developer: Firaxis Games
- Publisher: Infogrames Interactive
- Series: Civilization
- Platform: Windows
- Release: NA: October 29, 2002; UK: November 29, 2002
- Genre: Turn-based strategy
- Modes: Single-player, multiplayer

Civilization III: Play the World is the first expansion pack for Civilization III, released in October 2002. Play the World added more civilizations, a new multiplayer feature, new Wonders of the World, new units and new game modes, including: elimination, regicide, and capture the flag.

== Gameplay ==
One of the major features of Play the World was a "turnless game mode", a new concept never used in the previous versions of the Civilization series. The game mode allowed a mixture of turn-based and real time gameplay. In practice, this rarely worked as intended and many online players experienced "Out of sync" problems along with others. Little support from Firaxis and the sundry other problems resulted in the gamemode not returning in Civilization IV.

Play the World can also be found on Civilization III: Gold which includes the original Civilization III and Play the World. Civilization III: Play the World is also found in the Civilization III: Conquests expansion.

== Reception ==
Play the World was generally poorly received. The main feature, its online multiplayer, was extremely buggy and slow. Computer Gaming World labeled the game as a "train wreck", giving it one out of five stars. GameSpot named it the most disappointing computer game of 2002.
