= Civilization VI: Gathering Storm =

2019 video game expansion

- Developer: Firaxis Games
- Publisher: 2K Games
- Series: Civilization
- Platforms: Microsoft Windows, macOS, Linux, Nintendo Switch, PS4, Xbox One, Android
- Release: February 14, 2019
- Genres: Turn-based strategy, 4X
- Modes: Single-player, multiplayer

Sid Meier's Civilization VI: Gathering Storm is the second expansion pack for the turn-based strategy video game Civilization VI. It was released on February 14, 2019, about a year after the release of the first expansion Rise and Fall. It is available for Microsoft Windows, macOS and Linux. The expansion adds features, civilizations, leaders and wonders. Key additions are mechanics for natural disasters, and greenhouse gas emissions contributing to climate change and subsequent effects. It received generally positive reviews upon release.

== Gameplay ==
The focus of the Gathering Storm expansion is improving the game world with the weather and how human action affects the course of the game as well as late game consequences. The player has to face how their environment changes over time, whether randomly or as a consequence of their environmental decisions.

The expansion introduces natural disasters in the form of volcanic eruptions, river floods, rising sea levels, hurricanes, dust storms, blizzards, tornadoes, and droughts. Players are given ways to mitigate these by building improvements such as dams or sea barriers. Additionally, some of these events can be beneficial to players; for example, after river floods and volcanic eruptions, affected tiles may have their yields increased. The frequency of these events is affected by a new climate system. Late-game buildings can have their effectiveness improved by providing with the new power resource, which can be obtained by burning resources such as coal and oil. However, doing so will increase CO_{2} levels in the atmosphere, increasing the frequency of disasters. Players are also able to research green power alternatives such as solar, wind and geothermal power stations. Players can research the Computers tech and unlock flood barriers that are built on city centers. These buildings help provide protection from rising sea levels; without these improvements players will lose coastal tiles and sometimes even mainland tiles. The Future Era returns by adding new Technologies and Civics that will be unlocked randomly.

World generation is also changed: new terrain features, geothermal fissures and volcanoes, spawn along mountain ridges separating continents, and floodplains now spawn in larger clusters exclusively along rivers. Mountain ranges, rivers, volcanoes and deserts are now named after the civilization that discovered them. For example, a river discovered by the English might be named the Thames, whereas one discovered by the French could be named the Seine.

Diplomacy is also revamped, with the Diplomatic Victory condition and World Congress from previous games returning with the difference that you will need to accrue a certain number of Diplomatic Victory Points that can be earned in various ways and you will have to win votes multiple times, showing the diplomatic leadership in the different eras, in order to achieve diplomatic victory. The way in which votes are influenced are called Favors, which can increase the weight of your vote. The new Favor currency and a new Grievances system replace the base game's Warmonger score. The World Congress brings the players a lot more control over building resolutions from different components the way you might a peace treaty, and the international community votes on whether or not your resolution is carried in the session of the World Congress.

A number of systems from the base game and the previous expansion Rise and Fall have been tweaked, including the addition of more Historic Moments, a new Governor, improvements to the espionage system and changes to the science and culture victory conditions.

Nine new leaders and eight new civilizations were also introduced, alongside a variety of new units, natural and world wonders, a new technology and civics era and two new scenarios - The Black Death (Single player) and War Machine (Multiplayer Only), based on the 14th century pandemic of the same name and the WWI German-French conflict in Belgium respectively.

New civilizations include among others:

- Hungary, led by Matthias Corvinus, who specializes in levying units from city-state allies;
- the Māori, led by Kupe, who uniquely start off at sea and are encouraged to preserve the natural environment;
- Canada, led by Wilfrid Laurier, which has unique units and abilities within cold climate tiles;
- the Inca, led by Pachacuti, who gain unique benefits in relation to mountains;
- Mali, led by Mansa Musa, which can generate great deals of wealth from deserts and trading routes;
- Sweden, led by Kristina, who receives benefits to culture and tourism as well as great people;
- the Ottoman Empire, led by Suleiman, with major benefits towards besieging cities, as well as a unique governor for diplomacy and military.
- Phoenicia, led by Dido, with numerous benefits from ocean tiles and the ability to move their capital city freely.
- A unique leader, Eleanor of Aquitaine, can serve either as the leader of the English or French, and takes loyalty from cities near her Great Works.

== Reception ==
Reception

Aggregate score
Aggregator	Score
Metacritic	80/100

Gathering Storm received generally positive reviews from critics according to review aggregator platform Metacritic.

=== Accolades ===
The game was nominated for "Best Original Choral Composition" and "Best Original Soundtrack Album" at the 18th Annual G.A.N.G. Awards, for "Game Beyond Entertainment" at the 16th British Academy Games Awards, and for "Video Game Score of the Year" at the ASCAP Composers' Choice Awards.
