= Civilization VI: Rise and Fall =

- The key art piece of Rise and Fall, depicting Discobolus, continuing the statue motif of Civilization VI
- Developer: Firaxis Games
- Publishers: 2K Games, Aspyr
- Designer: Anton Strenger
- Series: Civilization
- Platforms: Microsoft Windows, macOS, iOS, Linux, Nintendo Switch, Xbox One, PlayStation 4, Android
- Release: February 8, 2018
- Genres: Turn-based strategy, 4X
- Modes: Single-player, multiplayer

Sid Meier's Civilization VI: Rise and Fall is the first official expansion pack for the turn-based strategy video game Civilization VI. Released on February 8, 2018, the expansion adds new features, civilizations, and leaders.

== Gameplay ==
The focus of the Rise and Fall expansion is to add mechanics that emulate the potential for civilization's rise then collapse due to a number of factors. The player will be challenged in how they deal with these turns in their civilization.

The expansion introduces global eras, triggered when any of the competing civilizations reaches the required milestones. All civilizations are evaluated for their Era Score at this point based on various advancement goals, including achieving certain Historic Moments such as circumnavigating the globe for the first time. The Era Score is used to determine if the civilization moves into a Golden Age (by exceeding a threshold) or a Dark Age (by failing to meet a different threshold), or otherwise proceeds into the next Era without these effects. In a Golden Age, populations of cities are more loyal to their leader, improving their production. On the other hand, populations in Dark Ages will be less loyal. If the player is able to bring their civilization out of a Dark Age by the time of the next global era shift, they can gain rewards such as new government-related edicts. Furthermore, if the player can bring their Dark Age to a Golden Age by the era shift, they enter a Heroic Age which grants several boosts to one's civilization well beyond a Golden Age. Regardless of which Age, players select a Dedication to try to follow for that Age, which earns additional points towards the Era Score by following through on the Dedication. Firaxis wants players to have risk-and-reward play for challenging themselves through a Dark Age.

Cities have a loyalty rating, which is affected by Golden or Dark Ages. Loyalty in cities is boosted by keeping the population happy, government edicts proper, and nearby cities loyal. However, loyalty can be lost by other government edicts, unhappiness, and the presence of nearby opposing cities. If a city's loyalty drops to zero, it becomes a Free City, no longer controlled by the player, and can be taken by any civilization through military or through exerting its own loyalty by nearby cities to convert it to their civilization. This means of using loyalty to take over Free Cities can also be used to take over the existing neutral city-states, though these lose their bonuses when they are converted. To support loyalty, players can create and assign a Governor to a city through the civics tree. Governors specialize in one of seven areas, like military or economy, and provide boosts to loyalty and other city functions if the city focuses on those tasks. Governors can be advanced in tiers to provide more powerful bonuses, but the player has a limited pool of upgrade points to spend towards this across all Governors, making them decide whether to have one or two powerful Governors among several weak ones, or a spread-out mid-tier set of Governors.

Civilizations can form alliances with other civilizations based on specific goals, such as a scientific alliance to share research, or an economic alliance to specialize in trade routes. Alliances can become more powerful over time. The expansion introduces emergencies which are triggered by specific events, such as a civilization using a nuclear weapon, or a civilization starting a holy war by taking over a city of a civilization with a different religion. Each civilization may become involved in the emergency, depending on the condition: in the case of a nuclear weapon, all other civilizations may be allied against the one that used it, while in the religious case, the situation will have the civilizations with one religion type facing against those with the other religion. Each side in the emergency then has a list of short-term goals to accomplish to attempt to be victorious in the situation. The first side to complete their goals gains rewards that last for the remainder of the game.

New units and city improvements were added to support these features, as well as a new type of district: the Government Plaza. A civilization can only have one Government Plaza, but government-based improvements placed there will have a significant boost to Loyalty and other benefits of that improvement. The expansion also adds new civilizations.

== Development ==
Firaxis' goal with Rise and Fall was to explore the rise and fall of civilizations and make the effects, be them beneficial or detrimental, more pronounced in the overall game, according to the expansion's producer Andrew Frederiksen. He said, "[what] we're trying to capture here is the ups and downs, sort of riding the waves through history that is so paramount when you look back at our own world." Whenever possible, the new mechanics were integrated with the game's existing systems rather than built as a new system atop those.

The expansion introduced nine new leaders and eight new civilizations:

- The Netherlands, led by Wilhelmina, who specializes in trading to her cities;
- Korea, led by Seondeok, with a specialty towards science;
- Mapuche, led by Lautaro benefiting from opponents in the new Golden Age system;
- Cree, led by Poundmaker, who establishes alliances and trade;
- Mongolia, led by Genghis Khan, which can form a mighty cavalry force;
- Georgia, led by Tamar, which specializes on Golden Ages, as well as faith-based growth;
- Scotland, led by Robert the Bruce, with a lean towards a strong science game based on amenities;
- The Zulu, led by Shaka, making waves with early game Corps and Armies, greatly increasing his military prowess;
- An alternate leader, Chandragupta, for the already-included Indian civilization, with a focus on military and faith benefits.

On the announcement for the Cree civilization, current Cree Headman Milton Tootoosis criticized the inclusion in the game, stating that they were not approached by Firaxis or 2K Games, and that the inclusion "perpetuates this myth that First Nations had similar values that the colonial culture has, and that is one of conquering other peoples and accessing their land. That is totally not in concert with our traditional ways and world view." Tootoosis did comment favorably that the promotional material suggests that Poundmaker attempted to bridge peace between the First Nations and settlers, putting the leader in a good light.

In October 2018, Aspyr confirmed that Rise and Fall would eventually be ported to the iOS edition of the game.

On July 24, 2019, Aspyr released Civilization VI: Rise and Fall expansion for iOS.

On September 24 2019, Aspyr confirmed that Rise and Fall would be ported along with Gathering Storm to the Nintendo Switch, Microsoft Xbox One and PlayStation 4, due for release November 22 2019.

== Reception ==
Reception

Aggregate score
Aggregator	Score
Metacritic	79/100

The game received generally positive reviews, according to review aggregator platform Metacritic.

It was nominated for "Best Original Choral Composition" with "Cree - The Atomic Era (The Drums of Poundmaker)" at the 2019 G.A.N.G. Awards.
