= EXI Wireless =

eXI Wireless is a Canadian business that develops and manufactures Radio Frequency IDentification (RFID) wireless systems. eXI's RFID products include HALO, RoamAlert, and Assetrac. eXI Wireless was acquired by VeriChip Corporation in April 2004.
