= At the Gates (video game) =

2019 video game

- Developer: Conifer Games
- Publisher: Conifer Games
- Designer: Jon Shafer
- Engine: Microsoft XNA
- Platforms: Windows, OS X, Linux
- Release: January 23, 2019
- Genre: Strategy
- Mode: Single-player

At the Gates is a 4X strategy video game by Jon Shafer, the lead designer of Civilization V. Like Civilization V, the game is played on a hex map. Players control a barbarian tribe, and their aim is to accelerate the fall of the Western Roman Empire. The map changes with the seasons, and resources are gradually depleted, forcing the players to migrate their tribe.

After realizing he missed being able to work on a video game instead of managing its production, Shafer first announced At the Gates in 2013, after stepping away from former employer Stardock. The game was partially funded through a Kickstarter crowdfunding campaign, raising $106,283 in March of that year. Originally scheduled for release in June 2014, the game was still unfinished even as Shafer began working for Paradox Interactive full-time in May 2017, with development continuing in Shafer's spare time. Conifer Games released At the Gates on January 23, 2019, after spending seven years in development.

== Development ==
Before his work on At the Gates, Shafer was employed at Stardock. He first helped the company redesign Elemental: War of Magic, after its initial 2010 release received poor reviews. After releasing the remake, Elemental: Fallen Enchantress, in 2012, Shafer received an opportunity to helm his own project. However, he realized during its development that managing the project wasn't nearly as enjoyable to him as making the game itself, stating, "it snowballs into this big chain of pain. You're trying to end up with something good, and it's hard".

In 2013, Shafer announced that he had left Stardock to form his own company, Conifer Games. He also reported that At the Gates would be Conifer Games' first title, which would be scheduled for release in June 2014. After announcing the project on crowdfunding platform Kickstarter, the game successfully raised $106,283 in funds towards its development in March 2013. Joining Shafer to work on the project was artist Kay Fedewa and programmer Jonathan Christ. Like Shafer, Fedewa and Christ were unpaid, but Shafer was the only one working full-time on the project.

Initially, At the Gates began as a "prototype of ideas" that Shafer wanted to try, such as cyclical map changes in the form of seasons. He also wanted to use his new game as an opportunity to improve on the work he did for Civilization V, criticizing his previous attempt at AI design, as well as his decision to let map tiles be occupied by only one character unit at a time. Work on the game had already begun a year before Shafer first announced the project.

Alpha testing began in October 2013, with Shafer setting a revised target release date of 2015, stating, "the goal with [At the Gates] is not just to make a strategy game that not only breaks new ground but also one that is polished at release". Inspired by other games like Crusader Kings, Shafer began adding more features to At the Gates beyond its original scope, significantly extending development time. This led to him struggling with balancing work and his personal life, ultimately causing him to stop posting updates on Kickstarter. Describing this period, Shafer noted:

I was in a situation where everything had fallen apart. I hadn’t worked on the game in a while. I wasn’t [answering] emails or paying bills or talking to people or anything. Everything just completely shut down.

As the game became increasingly delayed, Shafer took on a position at Paradox Interactive in May 2017, opting to split time between developing At the Gates and working for Paradox. However, it was announced after six months that he would be leaving the studio over creative differences.

After seven years of development, At the Gates was released on January 23, 2019.

== Reception ==
At the Gates received "mixed or average" reviews from critics, according to the review aggregation website Metacritic. PC Gamer wrote, "Passive AI and a flawed economy ruin what could have been a refreshing 4X experiment." Fellow review aggregator OpenCritic assessed that the game received fair approval, being recommended by 40% of critics. IGN wrote, "At the Gates tries some ambitious new ideas that, in time, may leave a mark on the 4X genre. But today, it's far too broken to recommend." Game Informer praised the combination of 4X gameplay with roguelike elements.
