= Oxide Games =

American video game developer

- Type: Private
- Industry: Video games
- Founded: January 1, 2013; 13 years ago
- Founders: Brad Wardell; Dan Baker; Marc Meyer; Brian Wade; Tim Kipp
- Headquarters: Lutherville-Timonium, Maryland, U.S.
- Products: Ashes of the Singularity
- Number of employees: 65
- Website: oxidegames.com

Oxide Games is an American video game developer based in Lutherville-Timonium, Maryland. The studio was founded in January 2013 by Brad Wardell and former Firaxis employees Dan Baker, Marc Meyer, Brian Wade, and Tim Kipp.

== History ==
Oxide Games focuses primarily on games and game engines for the Personal computer (PC). Initially founded to develop a next-generation game engine and games to use it the studio developed the Nitrous engine to take advantage of new graphics APIs that allowed multiple CPU cores to simultaneously access the GPU such as DirectX 12 and Mantle.

The studio's first release of its Nitrous technology came in the form of Star Swarm, a demonstration of thousands of 3D entities on screen to demonstrate the potential of a multicore rendering and task system.

In 2016, the studio's first game was published by Stardock, Ashes of the Singularity. It was the first game to make use of DirectX 12 after previously making a pre-beta version of it available as a benchmark for the new API.

The studio's founders helped contributed to High-Level Shader Language (HLSL) and have worked on several notable titles including Civilization, Command and Conquer, and Galactic Civilizations series.

On June 12, 2022, as part of the Xbox & Bethesda Games Showcase 2022, Oxide announced Ara: History Untold. This will be a 4X game comparable to the Civilization series of games that many members of the Oxide Games team worked on prior to the studio's formation.

== Games developed ==
Year	Title	Platform(s)	Publisher
2016	Ashes of the Singularity	Microsoft Windows	Stardock
2024	Ara: History Untold	Microsoft Windows	Xbox Game Studios

== Nitrous Engine ==
Nitrous Engine is the proprietary game engine software used in development for Oxide Games products. It uses the power of its proprietary SWARM (Simultaneous Work and Rendering Model) technology to achieve incredible performance on modern, multi-core computer hardware. SWARM allows Nitrous to do things previously thought impossible in real-time 3D rendering, like Object Space Lighting—the same techniques used in the film industry—and having thousands of unique individual units onscreen at once.

In 2016 Oxide and Dan Baker were part of the first major tech Demo for DX12 along with Brian Langley, Microsoft's DirectX 12 lead, Max McMullen, Microsoft's principal lead for Direct3D.

In April 2020 AMD and Oxide Games announced a multi-year partnership to co-develop graphics technologies for the growing cloud gaming market. The companies plan to create a set of tools and technologies for cloud rendering to meet the real-time demands of cloud-based gaming.

The Nitrous engine has been used by Stardock on a number of games including Star Control: Origins and Siege of Centauri.

== Accolades ==
In 2020, the studio was recognized by The Baltimore Sun as one of Baltimore's Top Small Employers for the year.
