= Civilization: Beyond Earth – Rising Tide =

Expansion pack for the game Civilization: Beyond Earth

Sid Meier's Civilization: Beyond Earth - Rising Tide
- Developer: Firaxis Games
- Publisher: 2K Games (Note: The Mac and the Linux version were published by Aspyr Media.)
- Producer: Andrew Frederiksen
- Designers: Will Miller; David McDonough
- Composers: Geoff Knorr; Griffin Cohen; Grant Kirkhope
- Series: Civilization
- Platforms: Microsoft Windows; OS X; Linux
- Release: October 9, 2015
- Genres: Turn-based strategy; 4X
- Modes: Single-player; Multiplayer

Sid Meier's Civilization: Beyond Earth – Rising Tide, is an official expansion pack for the turn-based strategy video game Civilization: Beyond Earth. It was released on October 9, 2015.

== Setting ==
In the aftermath of the first wave of colonies, the people of Earth continue to struggle for existence. New factions have arisen and have launched a new wave of colonies off planet.

== Gameplay ==
Rising Tide brings new features including expanded water gameplay (which includes floating cities), hybrid affinities, a completely revamped diplomacy system, and an expanded exploration system.

The expansion adds several new dimensions to aquatic gameplay. Unlike land based cities, or even ocean cities in previous iterations of the game, aquatic based cities can move. Movement, rather than culture, is the way aquatic cities expand their borders. Aquatic cities produce less unhealth, produce more energy and culture, and can create naval units much faster than land based cities. However, they are much harder to defend, and are less efficient at producing land and air units as land based cities would. On top of these differences several wonders and buildings are exclusive to either land or aquatic cities. Workers in RT can build farms on aquatic tiles, and they have an expanded number of aquatic tile types they can improve. When viewing at ocean tiles, water is transparent rather than blue allowing players to see the ocean floor. This graphical enhancement allows for players to see resources under the ocean.

Hybrid affinities add another twist to the Beyond Earth experience. In the original game, players are encouraged to earn points toward one of the affinities: Supremacy, Harmony, or Purity. The game favored choosing one affinity to level up while ignoring the other two. In Rising Tide, players are now also rewarded for leveling up multiple affinities at the same time. Several new units of the game can only be built if the player has points from multiple affinities.

While the base Beyond Earth game used a diplomatic system derived straight from Civilization V, diplomacy in Rising Tide is described as "completely rebuilt from scratch". Players can earn a new type of currency, diplomatic capital. Factions can earn this capital with certain buildings and wonders, and they can earn it trading with other factions. Each faction can use this capital to buy personality trait bonuses. Diplomatic capital can also be used to build new units and buildings but it can not be used to buy new tiles. The AI has a respect and fear factor. Players who the AI deems high in respect or fear may enter more beneficial relationships. Players with low fear or respect ratings are more likely to go to war. When entering a war, players now earn a war score. When entering peace negotiations, the higher the war score a player earns, the more concessions a player may get from the losing faction.

Exploration has an expanded role in Rising Tide. Players can find three types of artifacts: Old World Relics, Alien Biology Artifacts, and Progenitor Artifacts. When a player receives an artifact they may cash in these artifacts early for quick bonuses, or they can combine different artifacts to unlock different wonders, buildings or unit bonuses. Players may also discover Planetary Marvels. When a Marvel is discovered a planetwide quest is unlocked, which when completed provides many bonuses. Each biome has a different marvel.

On top of these changes to exploration, explorers can perform expeditions on water tiles. Players can now leash Aliens using explorers, allowing players to capture armies of aliens to fight for them.

Rising Tide adds two new biomes: frigid, an ice world, and primordial, a geologically active world. Aliens have different color patterns in each biome and will behave differently depending on what biome they are in. For example, aliens in a frigid biome tend to be fewer in number but stronger while those in a lush biome would be larger in number yet weaker.

=== New sponsors ===
Four new sponsors have also been added. The Beyond Earth spinoff game, Sid Meier's Starships, does not include the new sponsors introduced in Rising Tide.

==== Chungsu ====
Chungsu comes from the Korean Peninsula. This faction excels at espionage and can build its founding city on water tiles.

==== Al Falah ====
Al Falah comes from Arabia. Unlike the rest of the colonists, Al Falah colonists lived in generational ships rather than being cryonically frozen on sleeper ships. The colonists from this faction have never seen Earth, and its culture has evolved as such. This faction gets bonuses in City development.

==== North Sea Alliance ====
The North Sea Alliance comes from the British Isles and the Nordic region. This faction gets bonuses in water tiles, and can build its founding city on water tiles.

==== INTEGR ====
INTEGR comes from Germany. It gains bonuses in the new diplomacy system.

== Development ==
The development of Rising Tide was announced on May 18, 2015. The game was released on October 9, 2015. Several new features have been added post launch. A spoils of war system has been added to allow victors in war to pick what they want from the defeated foes. A black market has been added to allow players to buy or sell resources for diplomatic capital. The AI is much more aggressive toward players close to the completion of wonders or to victory.

== Reception ==
GameRankings gave it an 80.56% rating while Metacritic rated it 81/100.

Reception

Aggregate scores
Aggregator	Score
GameRankings	80.56%
Metacritic	81/100

Review scores
Publication	Score
GameSpot	9/10
IGN	7.1/10
PC Gamer (US)	73/100
