= Civilization III =

2001 turn-based strategy video game

- Developers: Firaxis Games (Win); Westlake Interactive (Mac)
- Publishers: Infogrames (Win); MacSoft (Mac)
- Producers: Michael Gibson; Jeffrey Kennedy
- Designers: Jeff Briggs; Soren Johnson
- Writer: Paul Murphy
- Composers: Roger Briggs; Mark Cromer
- Series: Civilization
- Platforms: Microsoft Windows, Mac OS
- Release: Windows: NA: October 30, 2001; EU: March 1, 2002; Mac OS: NA: January 6, 2002
- Genre: Turn-based strategy
- Modes: Single-player, multiplayer

Sid Meier's Civilization III is the third installment of the Sid Meier's Civilization turn-based strategy video game series. It was released in 2001, and followed by Civilization IV. Unlike the original game, Civilization III was not designed by Sid Meier, but by Jeff Briggs, a game designer, and Soren Johnson, a game programmer.

Civilization III, like the other Civilization games, entails building an empire, from the ground up, beginning in 4,000 BC and continuing slightly beyond the modern day. The player must construct and improve cities, train military and non-military units, improve terrain, research technologies, build Wonders of the World, make war or peace with neighboring civilizations, and so on. The player must balance a good infrastructure, resources, diplomatic and trading skills, technological advancement, city and empire management, culture, and military power to succeed.

== Gameplay ==
Configuring city resources in the game

The game map is made up of square tiles on a grid. Each city, terrain improvement, and unit is located in a specific tile, and each tile can host any number of units. Land tiles can contain a transportation improvement (road or railroad) and a land improvement (farm or mine) or a city. Cities must be built a minimum of one tile away from each other, i.e., no two cities may touch. Each tile is made of a particular type of terrain that determines, among other things, how much food, production, and trade it produces when "worked". A tile can only be worked if it is one of the twenty tiles surrounding a city. A tile can only be worked by one city at a time, and each city can only work a number of tiles equal to or less than its population.

Food is used to grow the player's cities. Each population unit requires food to survive, and excess food is stored. Production, represented in the game as "shields", is used to build units, buildings, and wonders. Commerce powers the player's economy. This commerce is split up as the player sees fit between research, tax revenue, and luxuries, each with a different purpose.

Each city's citizens have a certain mood (happy, content, unhappy, or resisting). If most citizens are unhappy, the city falls into civil disorder and all production ceases; if a city remains in civil disorder for too long, it can lead to rioting, which results in improvements being destroyed. If most citizens are happy, they will like their leader and increase economic benefits.

Terrain improvements are built by Worker units. Irrigation increases food, mines increase production, and roads increase commerce and reduce movement costs for all allied land units using them. Two civilizations must have Right of passage treaty signed to benefit from each other's roads.

Buildings enhance a city in some way and cost maintenance. Like units and Wonders, each one can only be built when the requisite technology has been acquired. Buildings require financial maintenance each turn, and can be destroyed. Only one of each type of building can be constructed in each city.

As in previous installments of Civilization, there are unique Wonders of the World that can only be built once per game. Wonders provide a variety of major benefits to a specific city, all cities on a continent, or to an entire empire. Civilization III also added Small Wonders, which are functionally equivalent to Wonders except that each one can be constructed once per civilization, as opposed to once in every whole game. Small Wonders have, for the most part, a sociological requirement to construct them, as well as a technological requirement. When a civilization captures a city with a Small Wonder, it is automatically destroyed. Some examples of small wonders are Wall Street, the Forbidden Palace, and The Pentagon.

One of the major features of gameplay is scientific research. Completing the research of a new technology will make available new units, city improvements, and wonders of the world, as well as special bonuses and abilities that are related to the technology. The technology tree is divided into four ages (Ancient Age, Middle Ages, Industrial Age, and Modern Age); each age requires the research of specific technologies to advance to that age. Additionally, there are non-requisite technologies that nevertheless provide useful bonuses that are often essential for good empire management, or allow a civilization to install a new government. Technologies can also be traded to and from other civilizations in return for gold, resources, technologies, workers, and cities. Technologies acquired in this way can in turn be exchanged (also called 'technology brokering') for other new technologies by contacting one or more other civilizations.

Citizens are the people who work in a city. There are four kinds: Laborers, Entertainers, Tax Collectors, and Scientists. If there are more citizens in a city than available tiles to work, the extra citizens automatically become Entertainers. The second expansion, Conquests, adds two new types of citizens to the game: Policemen (reduce corruption) and Civil Engineers (enhance building and wonder production).

Culture is a feature that was not present in previous installments of the franchise. Each city has a cultural rating, which is the city's influence over local terrain. Essentially, the culture's outer edge, or "border", acts as the boundary of each civilization's empire. As the city's culture rating increases, so does its sphere of influence, bringing more territory under the player's control. Civilizations' borders may abut, resulting in their culture ratings vying for territory. If one player's culture rating is sufficiently higher than the other's, the former's borders will encroach into territory previously owned by the latter. Given enough time and cultural pressure, the latter player's city may even elect to join, or "flip to," the former's empire. Culture can thus serve as a means of peaceful conquest.

Every civilization starts with certain special abilities, and they have a special "unique unit" that only they can build; these units usually have a historical basis (for example: the Japanese unique unit is the samurai, which replaces the standard knight, whereas the British unique unit is the Man-O-War, which replaces the standard frigate).

Citizens may be of different nationalities

Citizens have a nationality based upon the civilization under which they were "born." Citizens have a "memory" of their nationality and will consider themselves members of their previous civilization until they are assimilated into their new civilization.

Combat is an important aspect of the game. Each combat unit begins as a "regular" unit with three hit points (although some units have additional hit points bonuses which affect their stats). If the unit loses all its hit points, it dies. Units can be promoted after successful combat missions and gain hit points. The highest rank a unit can attain is that of "elite" (which features five hit points), whereas the lowest is "conscript" (featuring two hit points; this rank is only given to newly drafted soldiers and barbarian units). Each unit has an attack and defense value to determine the winner of each battle. Additional defensive bonuses can be conferred by, e.g., certain terrain types, the unit's "Fortify" command, or defending across a river. Ultimately, a random number generator determines the outcome of each battle. When an elite unit wins a battle against an enemy unit, there is also a small chance that it will produce a Great Leader. A Great Leader has the ability to create an Army or instantly finish construction of a building in a city, which made them particularly useful for completing wonders.

With respect to developing the cities within an empire, bonus resources may be found on tiles within the cultural borders. Each type of resource may provide a bonus to food, production, or commerce if found within the city radius and worked by a citizen. Particular kinds of resources, such as luxury or strategic resources, provide additional benefits such as increasing citizens' happiness or providing access to resource-specific combat units.

Corruption exists in Civilization III alongside waste, which decreases a city's productivity; together, corruption and waste represent the mismanagement of resources, the malfeasance of city-level bureaucrats, and the limits of a central authority's ability to manage an empire. Corruption and waste is often lowest in the capital city and highest on the outskirts of an empire. Furthermore, the levels of corruption and waste are dependent on the system of government of a civilization. There are a number of ways to combat corruption which include building city improvements, such as the courthouse and the police station. Small wonders like the Forbidden Palace and the Secret Police HQ also drastically reduce corruption and waste by acting, in effect, as supplementary capitals.

There are several ways to win the game. A player needs to meet only one of the victory conditions in order to win. These include Conquest victory, achieved when no civilizations besides the player's exist; Domination victory, achieved when two thirds of the world's land and population are controlled by the player; Cultural victory, achieved when the player successfully assimilates other civilizations; Diplomatic victory, achieved when the player is elected leader of the United Nations; and a science-based victory, achieved when the player researches a sufficient number of technologies and builds a spaceship to reach Alpha Centauri. If no civilization has met any of the other victory conditions by the year 2050, the civilization with the highest score wins the game.

== Development ==
Civilization III was released after about two years of development on October 30, 2001. Developed by Westlake Interactive and published by MacSoft, a version for Mac OS was released on January 6, 2002.

== Reception ==
=== Sales ===
In the United States, Civilization III entered NPD Intelect's weekly computer game sales rankings at #1 for October 28–November 3, 2001. Its Collectors Edition SKU claimed second during the period. Thanks to this debut, Civilization III became the country's fourth-best-selling computer title of October as a whole, with an average retail price of $49. In its second week of availability, the game was pushed to #2 by Backyard Basketball, and the Collectors Edition was absent from the top 10. Firaxis's title remained in NPD's weekly top 10 from November 11–December 1, and took sixth place for November as a whole. After an absence, it reappeared in the weekly top 10 twice during December and secured 11th for the month. Civilization III finished 2001 with domestic sales of 294,789 units, for revenues of $13.5 million.

Civilization III sold 550,000 copies and earned $21.7 million in the United States by August 2006. At the time, this led Edge to declare it the country's 21st-best-selling computer game released since January 2000. Combined sales of all Civilization titles released during the 2000s totaled 2.5 million units by 2006. Internationally, Civilization III received a "Silver" sales award from the Entertainment and Leisure Software Publishers Association (ELSPA), indicating sales of at least 100,000 copies in the United Kingdom.

=== Reviews and awards ===
Reception

Aggregate score
Aggregator	Score
Metacritic	90/100

Review scores
Publication	Score
Game Informer	8.5/10
GameRevolution	A−
GameSpot	9.2/10
IGN	9.3/10
Next Generation	5/5
PC Gamer (US)	92%

Jeff Lundrigan reviewed the PC version of the game for Next Generation, rating it five stars out of five, and stated that "Given that Civ II was as close to perfect as any game has ever been, it's arguable that it wasn't possible to change it so much as add to it."

Upon release, the reaction to Civilization III was very positive. It won several "Game of the Year" awards, such as the "PC Strategy" award from the AIAS' 5th Annual Interactive Achievement Awards (along with nominations for "Computer Game of the Year" and "Game of the Year"). The editors of Computer Games Magazine named Civilization III the best strategy title and best overall computer game of 2001. They commented, "It's the best Civilization yet, and that's saying something." Nonetheless, the initial release of the game was slightly marred by bugs and glitches. The first patch came very soon after the game's initial release and other patches were released subsequently, improving gameplay significantly. The patches also added certain features, such as the group movement command. There were complaints about the addition of features and bug fixes after initial release.

The editors of PC Gamer US awarded Civilization III their 2001 "Best Turn-Based Strategy Game" prize, and wrote that it "manages to recapture all that was great about its predecessors and color them with a few great new strokes—without pantsing up what was so great about them in the first place." Civilization III was a nominee for Computer Gaming World's 2001 "Best Strategy Game" award, which ultimately went to Kohan: Immortal Sovereigns. The editors wrote, "Civilization III was another fantastic candidate. Many feel it's the best game so far in the series and is the new benchmark for turn-based strategy games."

== Expansions ==
Two expansion sets have been published for Sid Meier's Civilization III: Play the World in October 2002, and Conquests in November 2003. Play the World added multiplayer capabilities, eight new civilizations and some new units to the original release. The roll-out of the multiplayer functionalities with this expansion was highly criticized. Play the World was followed-up by Conquests, which offers nine more historical scenarios, ranging from Mesopotamia to WWII in the Pacific. Many of these scenarios have resources, improvements, wonders, music, and even government types that are specific to the scenario, especially the Mesoamerican and Sengoku Japan campaigns.

The stand-alone version is Civilization III: Complete Edition, which includes the two expansions and several patches. (This version came after Civilization III: Gold Edition and Civilization III: Game of the Year Edition.)

== Board game ==
In 2002, Eagle Games published the Sid Meier's Civilization board game, created by Glenn Dover. The game was based on Civilization III and mirrored many of the video game's concepts and gameplay components.
