= Civilization III: Conquests =

Expansion pack of Civilization III video game

- Developers: BreakAway Games; Firaxis Games
- Publisher: Atari Interactive
- Series: Civilization
- Platform: Windows
- Release: NA: November 4, 2003; EU: November 7, 2003; AU: November 20, 2003
- Genre: Turn-based strategy
- Modes: Single player, multiplayer

Civilization III: Conquests is the second and final expansion pack for the video game Civilization III (2001), first released in 2003. Like the first expansion pack, Play the World, it added eight more playable civilizations, introduced new gameplay concepts, and added two new types of government.

== List of features and concepts ==
- Seven new civilizations: Byzantines, the Dutch, the Hittites, the Incans, the Mayans, the Portuguese and the Sumerians (plus the Austrians through an editor). The total number of playable civilizations rose to 31 total, the maximum supported by the game engine.
- Two special "civilization traits" were added: seafaring and agricultural. Some of the original civilizations had their traits changed for this release; the English were changed from Expansionist/Commercial to Seafaring/Commercial.
- Two new government types were added: Feudalism and Fascism
- New bonus resources, types of terrain, and buildings (Wonders of the World) were added.

A new feature introduced was called scenarios, which were intended for multiplayer gaming. The scenarios are shorter than the main game, take less time to finish, and mainly focus on a specific period in history.

Nine "Conquests," or scenarios, were added to this game. They were: Mesopotamia, the Rise of Rome, the Fall of Rome, the Middle Ages in Europe, Mesoamerica, the Age of Discovery, the Napoleonic Wars, the Sengoku period in Japan, and the Pacific Theater of World War II.

Conquests was the second and final expansion. In 2004, Civilization III: Complete was released, compiling the base game and both expansions into one package.

== Reception ==
Reception

Aggregate score
Aggregator	Score
Metacritic	86/100

Review score
Publication	Score
IGN	8.5

Civilization III: Conquests was a runner-up for Computer Games Magazine's "Expansion of the Year" award, which ultimately went to EverQuest: Lost Dungeons of Norrath.
