= Sid Meier's Starships =

2015 turn-based strategy video game

- Developer: Firaxis Games
- Publisher: 2K
- Designer: Sid Meier
- Series: Civilization
- Platforms: Microsoft Windows; macOS; iOS
- Release: March 12, 2015
- Genre: Turn-based strategy
- Mode: Single-player

Sid Meier's Starships is a turn-based strategy video game developed by Firaxis Games and published by 2K. It was released on March 12, 2015, for Microsoft Windows, OS X, and iOS. The game is a stand-alone title but shares the same universe as Civilization: Beyond Earth, putting the player in control of a fleet of space-faring craft. The player will use the fleet to explore the galaxy, meeting other human and alien forces, and dealing with problems through a combination of military, diplomatic, and other strategic options. Spacecraft in the fleet can be highly customized for meeting certain goals. The game features cross-connectivity features with Beyond Earth for those that own both titles.

Starships was based on Sid Meier's idea of extending the Beyond Earth setting, in which the player guides the development of one of several human colonies on an alien world, and he considers it a further narrative of that game, exploring the universe and encountering other human colonies and threats it may hold. In his concept, Meier wanted to focus on starship creation, including highly configurable ships, and space combat, while providing the player with "a universe filled with interstellar adventure, diplomacy, and exploration". The game was developed by Meier and a small team at Firaxis.

== Reception ==
Reception

Aggregate score
Aggregator	Score	
Aggregator	iOS	PC
Metacritic	75/100	64/100

Review scores
Publication	Score	
Publication	iOS	PC
Game Informer	N/A	7/10
GameRevolution	N/A	7/10
GameSpot	N/A	4/10
Gamezebo	5/5	N/A
IGN	N/A	6.5/10
PC Gamer (UK)	N/A	54%
PCGamesN	N/A	7/10
Pocket Gamer	4.5/5	N/A
Polygon	6/10	6.5/10
Shacknews	N/A	7/10
The Guardian	N/A	4/5
TouchArcade	4/5	N/A
The Escapist	N/A	4/5
National Post	N/A	8/10

The iOS version received "generally favorable reviews", while the PC version received "mixed" reviews, according to the review aggregation website Metacritic. IGN said of the same PC version, "Sid Meier's Starships produces a few good tactical battles before its AI loses steam and its strategy gets frustrating."

The Escapist gave the PC version a score of four stars out of five, saying that it "lacks the strategic depth of Civilization, but the added tactical layer, and shorter game times make it a fair substitute, especially if you're looking for bite-sized strategy." National Post gave it a similar score of eight out of ten, saying that the game "may lack the complexity and nuance of other strategy games, and it feels a bit rough around the edges in places, but its accessibility, terrific turn-based combat, and bite-sized duration combine to create a tempting alternative to a multi-evening marathon campaign." Metro gave it a score of seven out of ten, saying, "Fast-paced and accessible are not words commonly used to describe turn-based strategy games, but Sid Meier's latest is a fun, breezy strategic time killer." GameSpot gave the PC version four stars out of ten, saying "it's a strategy game without strategy, enabling you to sleepwalk your way to triumph."
