= Civilization: Beyond Earth =

2014 video game

Sid Meier's Civilization: Beyond Earth
- Developer: Firaxis Games
- Publisher: 2K Games (Note: The OS X and Linux versions were published by Aspyr Media.)
- Producer: Lena Brenk
- Designers: Will Miller; David McDonough
- Programmer: Don Wuenschell
- Artist: Michael R. Bates
- Writers: Rex Martin; Peter Murray; Walt Williams; Scott Wittbecker
- Composers: Griffin Cohen; Geoff Knorr; Michael Curran; Grant Kirkhope
- Series: Civilization
- Engine: cf. LORE
- Platforms: Microsoft Windows; OS X; Linux
- Release: Microsoft Windows; October 24, 2014; OS X; November 26, 2014; Linux; December 18, 2014
- Genres: Turn-based strategy; 4X
- Modes: Single-player; Multiplayer

Sid Meier's Civilization: Beyond Earth is a turn-based strategy, 4X video game in the Civilization series developed by Firaxis Games, published by 2K Games and released for Microsoft Windows on October 24, 2014, the Mac App Store on November 27, 2014 and for Linux on December 18, 2014. The game's premise is that Earth became uninhabitable due to an undescribed disaster known as "the Great Mistake", forcing humanity to colonize space in the 23rd century. As a spiritual successor to the 1999 game Alpha Centauri, Beyond Earth shares much of its development team and some concepts, most notably its setting on an exoplanet in the future.

An expansion pack, titled Rising Tide, was released on October 9, 2015.

== Gameplay ==
Beyond Earth is a turn-based strategy game played on a hexagonal grid, iterating the ideas and building upon the engine of its predecessor, Civilization V. Co-lead designer David McDonough described the relationship between the two games by saying "The bones of the experience are very much recognisably Civ. The idea of the cities, city-base progression, leaders, the passage of time, tile-based, turn-based, building improvements, technologies. A lot of them are very familiar themes to the Civ player."

=== Changes from the traditional Civilization formula ===
There are a number of significant changes from the Civilization model. In previous Civilization titles, players selected from historical empires led by historical figures, each with preset personalities. In Beyond Earth, players make choices at the beginning of the game, including what sponsors backed their expedition, what kind of spacecraft they used to reach the planet, and who and what they brought to the new world, allowing players to create a customized civilization of their own. Early decisions have a significant effect on the gameplay.

Because Beyond Earth's "tech web" branches out radially and requires only one prerequisite to unlock dependent technologies, players can research certain directions in depth while ignoring other directions. Traditional Civilization technologies instead require all prerequisites, for a more linear technology tree that advances in one general direction over time. While technology can be stolen, Beyond Earth intentionally does not allow for technology trading, and it is difficult to unlock all of the game's technologies in a single playthrough. This encourages players to be more selective in their technology choices and specialize in certain directions based on the player's situations and strategy.

The "affinities" are overarching philosophies on human advancement that shape players' technological advancement and unlock affinity-unique units. The Harmony affinity aims to co-exist with the planet, utilizing genetic modification, and is able to domesticate the native wildlife. The Supremacy affinity puts its trust in advanced technology, and utilizes highly specialized units that aid each other on the field. The Purity affinity is isolationist, building powerful defensive structures and attempting to make the new planet more Earth-like. Each affinity has a special project that is unlocked once fully embraced, and grants victory to the player who completes it first. Other victory conditions include conquering the other factions by force and following the traces of an alien civilization in order to ultimately establish contact.

Beyond Earth adds a quest system to the civilization formula. Quests can come from the construction of buildings or the discovery of certain items. Many quests give the player a choice on what perks they want.

Aliens are more than just the "barbarians" of a traditional civilization game. They tend to be in much greater numbers and can put up a much bigger fight in the beginning of the game. Should the player choose to provoke them, aliens tend to be more aggressive, and may openly attack the player's lands.

An orbital layer has been added to Beyond Earth. Satellites launched around a faction's orbital layer provide bonuses to the tiles below them. For example, if a player launches a solar collector, any tile below this collector will provide the player with an additional energy bonus. In the later game, some satellites can serve as weaponry or can help transport units across the map. To counter orbital units artillery style units can shoot them down.

Additionally, many of the later game technologies that were present in previous Civilization titles are now available very early in the game, or, as some developers put it during a YouTube game/interview, players are not "reinventing the wheel".

== Development ==
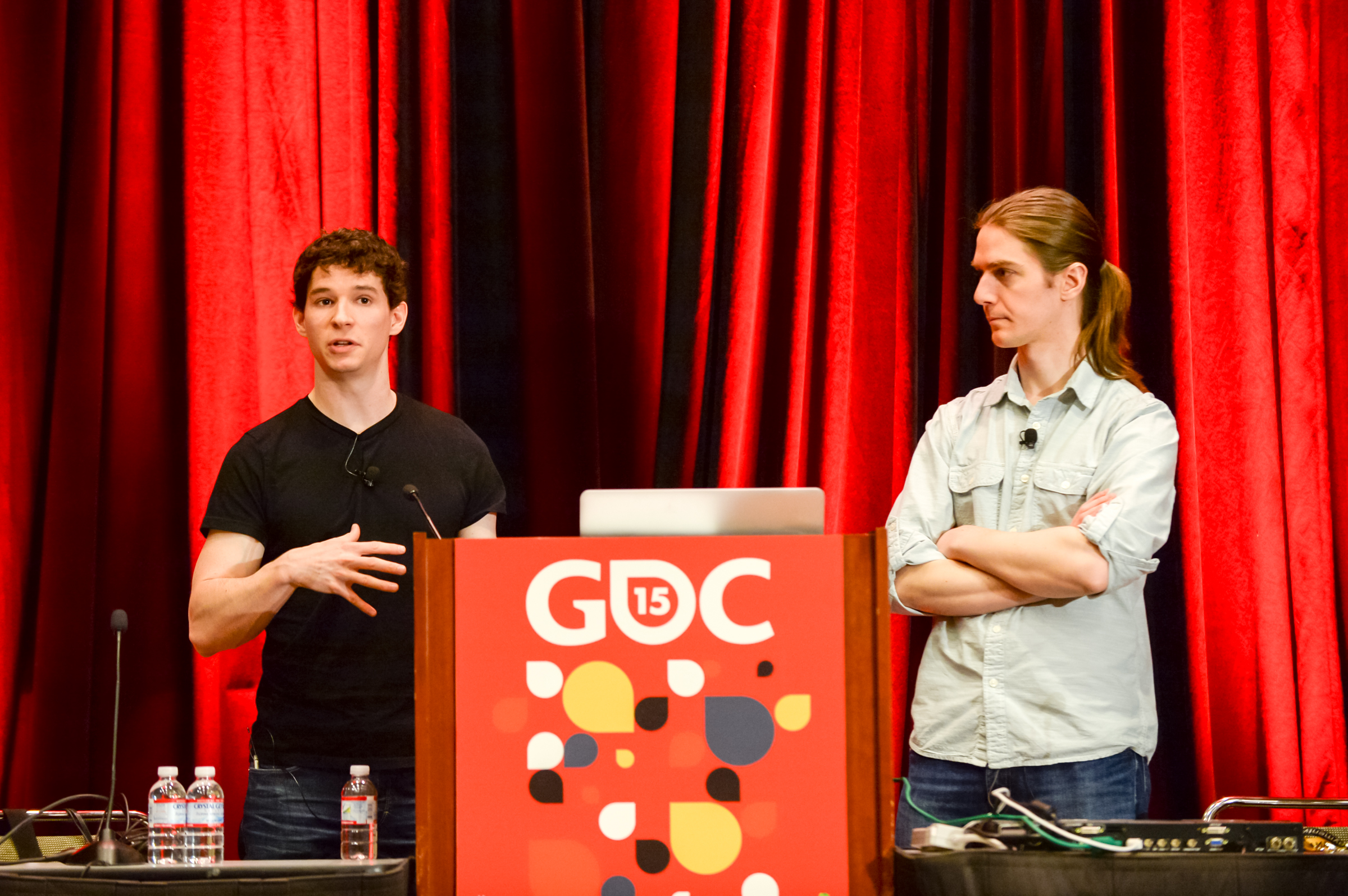
Firaxis lead designers Will Miller and David McDonough present a development retrospective at GDC 2015

Civilization: Beyond Earth was announced by Firaxis Games on April 12, 2014 at PAX East in Boston, Massachusetts.

In designing the tech web, the Beyond Earth team began by going to the Wikipedia article on Alpha Centauri, as well as reading books the article listed as sources of inspiration for Alpha Centauri designer Brian Reynolds. The events of the game are set roughly 200 to 300 years from the present, and the development team are using modern day space sciences, such as the SpaceX launches and the lessons of Cosmos: A Spacetime Odyssey, to develop their vision for the game's future. The game was also announced to support AMD's Mantle API in a post-announcement interview.

Firaxis Games and its publisher Take-Two Interactive garnered criticism from the gaming community in August after the price of the Australian retail and digital distributed version was adjusted from $49.95 to $89.95 without warning. Many gaming publications and consumers criticized the move, relating the price increase to the Australia Tax.

In early 2015, Firaxis announced Sid Meier's Starships, a standalone title that builds upon the narrative of Beyond Earth, featuring space fleet-based exploration of the larger galaxy. The game, released in March 2015, includes cross-connectivity with Beyond Earth for those that own both titles.

=== LORE ===
LORE (Low Overhead Rendering Engine) is the name of the graphics engine used by Civilization V, the predecessor of Civilization: Beyond Earth. Unlike OpenGL or Direct3D until version 11, LORE employs a stateless concept as implemented by Mantle, Direct3D 12 and Vulkan. While Civilization: Beyond Earth officially supports Mantle, no announcements have been made by Firaxis to also implement support for Vulkan or Direct3D 12.

== Rising Tide ==
Sid Meier's Civilization: Beyond Earth: Rising Tide, is the official expansion pack for the turn-based strategy video game Civilization: Beyond Earth that was announced on May 18, 2015 and released on October 9, 2015.

The expansion's features include an improved diplomacy system, expanded water gameplay (which includes floating cities), a new artifact system and hybrid affinities. It is set in the aftermath of the first wave of colonies, in which the people of Earth continue to struggle for existence. New factions have arisen and have launched a new wave of colonies off planet.

The biggest change in Rising Tide is the addition of aquatic cities. Unlike land based cities, or even ocean cities in previous iterations of the game, aquatic based cities can move. In addition to the major changes, Rising Tide adds two new biomes: frigid, an ice world; and primordial, a geologically active world. Four new sponsors have also been added.

== Reception ==
Reception

Aggregate scores
Aggregator	Score
GameRankings	80%
Metacritic	81/100

Review scores
Publication	Score
Destructoid	9/10
Eurogamer	8/10
Game Informer	9/10
GameRevolution	4/5
GameSpot	7/10
GamesRadar+	4/5
GameTrailers	8.7/10
Giant Bomb	3/5
IGN	7.9/10
Joystiq	4/5
PC Gamer (US)	87/100
Polygon	9/10
Daily Dot	4.5/5

Civilization: Beyond Earth received positive reviews. It received an aggregated score of 80% on GameRankings based on 52 reviews and 81/100 on Metacritic based on 78 reviews.

During the 18th Annual D.I.C.E. Awards, the Academy of Interactive Arts & Sciences nominated Civilization: Beyond Earth for "Strategy/Simulation Game of the Year".

Daniel Tack from Game Informer gave the game 9/10, praising the new affinity system which influence players take on how to approach the alien life and the future of humanity on the new planet. He also praised the interesting sound effects, comprehensive advice guide and high replay value.

Darren Nakamura from Destructoid also gave the game 9/10, praising the rewarding gameplay, colorful visuals, various new and influential features such as the orbital layer, the Virtues and the Affinity system, substantial overhaul in the technology system and appropriately grandiose soundtrack. He also stated that the story "had been emphasized more strongly than any previous title in the series."

Ben Moore from GameTrailers gave the game 8.7/10, praising the tech web system, which he described as "the biggest and best addition in the game", as well as the multiplayer aspect, which changed the tone of the game drastically and made the game feel far more unpredictable. He criticized the diplomacy and the AI for being restrictively rigid.

Russ Pitts from PC Gamer gave the game 87/100, praising the reactive AI, huge variety of alien lifeforms, as well as the orbital layer, which he described as "a fun, new twist and an engaging tactical element to Civ 5’s already finely tuned tactical game." He criticized the game for being too similar to Civilization V, as well as occasionally confusing and anticlimactically concluded quests. He concluded that Beyond Earth had succeeded as it is steeped in the traditions and mechanics of Civilization, but is nevertheless surprising and new in often unexpected ways."

Nick Tan from Game Revolution praised the strong contextual setting, but added that several issues from Civilization V have been left unaddressed, such as limited diplomacy and trade between civilizations, as well as the lack of indicators which he stated "plagues the game throughout" and "strains the experience unnecessarily".

Dennis Scimeca from The Daily Dot gave the game 4.5/5, praising its consistency within the larger context of the Civilization franchise, and the added level of structure presented by the quest system. He felt the Affinity system was extraneous, however, and the new layout of the tech tree did not make scientific research markedly different from previous Civilization games.

David Roberts from GamesRadar gave the game 8/10, praising the familiar Civilization gameplay, rewarding quests, and affinities, which change how players approach the new world's alien resources, but criticizing the game for being too similar to its predecessors, as well as the late game for being less interesting than opening turns. He also stated the game would be incredibly complex for players who are new to the franchise.

Nick Capozzoli from GameSpot gave the game 7/10, praising the affinity system and quests, which bring a narrative to the player's civilization development. He criticized the unbalanced and non-challenging gameplay, as well as the pared-back culture system, which results in excessive focus on military conquest.

Alex Navarro from Giant Bomb gave the game 3/5, criticizing its meaningless and inconsequential choices, which he stated did not really have any significant impact in winning a game. He also criticized the passive AI, gameplay mechanics that rarely work, lack of personality, lack of improvement over the game's predecessor, and too great a similarity to Civilization V in both user interface, pacing, and visual design. He summarized his review by saying that Beyond Earth "itself feels incomplete and regressive compared to the many changes made to Civ V's formula throughout its lifespan."
