= Firaxis Games =

American video game developer

Firaxis Games, Inc.
- Firaxis's logo features a fire wheel, meant to symbolize the "fiery axis of creativity from which all great game elements arise".
- Formerly: Firaxis Software, Inc. (1996–1997)
- Type: Subsidiary
- Industry: Video games
- Founded: May 1, 1996; 30 years ago in Hunt Valley, Maryland, US
- Founders: Sid Meier; Jeff Briggs; Brian Reynolds
- Headquarters: Sparks, Maryland, US
- Key people: Heather Hazen (studio head); Sid Meier (creative development director)
- Products: See List of games by Firaxis Games
- Number of employees: ▲180 (2015)
- Parent: 2K (2005–present)
- Website: firaxis.com

Firaxis Games, Inc. is an American video game developer based in Sparks, Maryland. The company was founded in May 1996 by Sid Meier, Jeff Briggs, and Brian Reynolds following their departure from MicroProse, Meier's earlier venture. They were acquired by Take-Two Interactive in August 2005, and subsequently became part of the publisher's 2K label. Firaxis Games is best known for their entries in the Civilization and XCOM series, as well as many other games bearing Meier's name.

== History ==
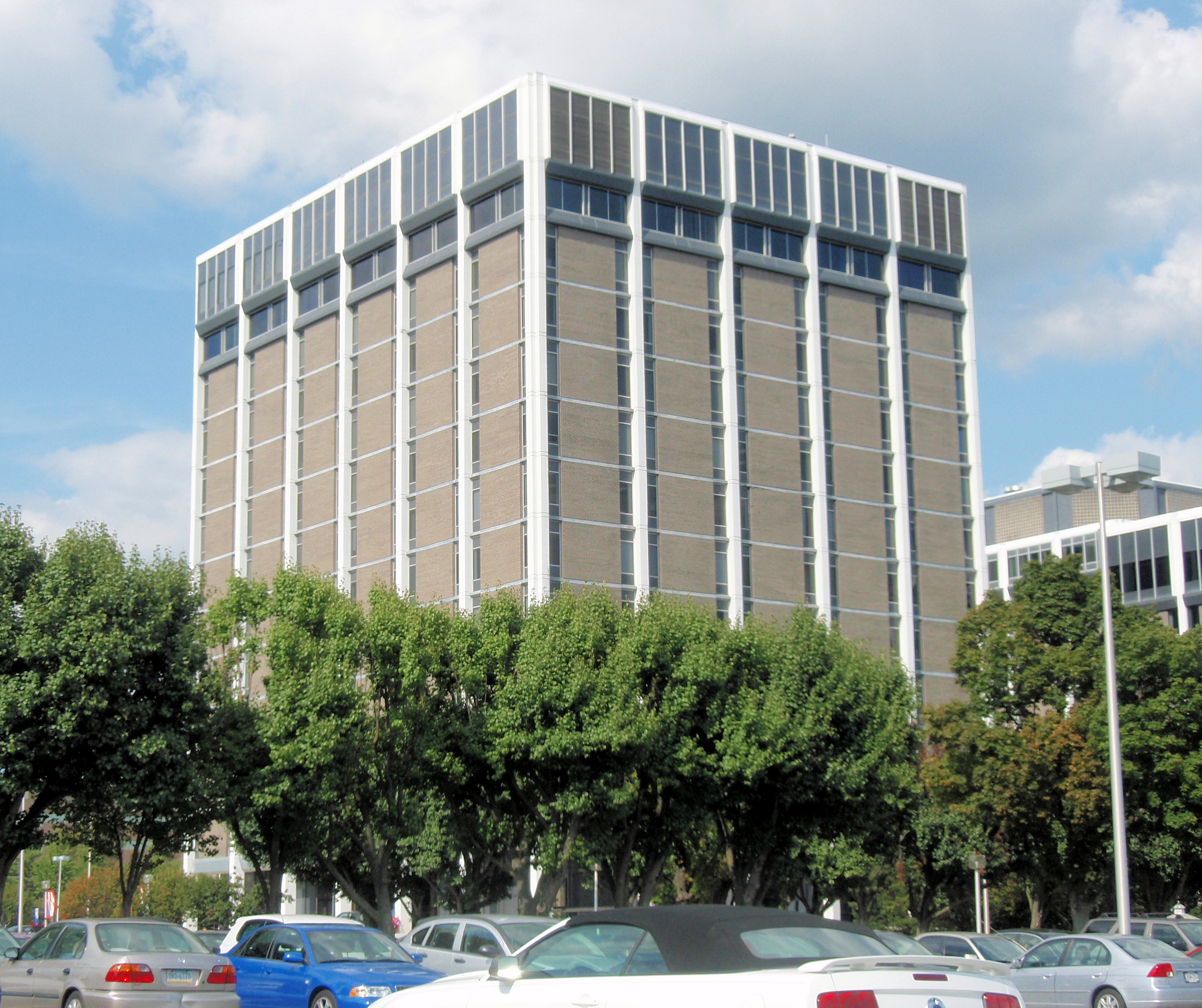
Executive Plaza III at 11350 McCormick Road, Hunt Valley, Maryland, home to Firaxis Games' former headquarters

Firaxis Software was founded on May 1, 1996, by Sid Meier, Brian Reynolds and Jeff Briggs, three video game designers formerly employed by MicroProse, a video game venture founded by Meier and partner Bill Stealey in 1982. The name "Firaxis", a portmanteau of "fiery" and "axis", was derived from the name of a piece of music created by Briggs. Briggs explained that they decided to stay in the Baltimore area, rather than moving to Silicon Valley, because it was "just a great place to be".

Unlike MicroProse, Firaxis Software aimed at being a "design house", leaving manufacturing, marketing, and distribution of their games to outside contractors. As such, the company talked to six potential video game publishers for its games, and finally signed an agreement with Electronic Arts, through which their games would be distributed under Electronic Arts' Origin Systems label.

The studio's opening was announced on June 24, 1996. Firaxis Software was originally located in a 2,500-square-foot office on Gilroy Road in Hunt Valley, Maryland, temporarily sharing office space. To accommodate their growth, in February 1997, they announced that they were moving their corporate headquarters to a 7,200-square-foot office suite in Executive Plaza III, an office building at 11350 McCormick Road and part of the Hunt Valley Business Community. The deal, assisted by broker William W. Whitty Jr. of MacKenzie/O'Conor, Piper & Flynn Commercial Real Estate Services, was expected to be completed by March that year. The company had 13 employees at the time.

Firaxis Software announced their first title, Sid Meier's Gettysburg!, in June 1997. Interimly, on July 24, 1997, the company was legally renamed Firaxis Games. Electronic Arts announced they had acquired a minority interest in Firaxis Games, at undisclosed terms, in August 1997. By September 1997, Firaxis Games signed life insurances for its three founders. Gettysburg! was released in October 1997 to critical and commercial success, scoring near-perfect reviews from critics, and selling 200,000 copies by August 1999. Starting with Gettysburg!, Firaxis Games prefixed all games designed by Meier with "Sid Meier's", a trend the three founders carried over from MicroProse, as they believed that Meier's name added more recognizability to their games. For his works on many MicroProse games, as well as Gettysburg! and Firaxis Games' second title, Sid Meier's Alpha Centauri, Meier became the second-ever person in the Academy of Interactive Arts & Sciences's Hall of Fame, following Shigeru Miyamoto. Co-founder Reynolds left Firaxis Games to pursue his personal interests in February 2000. To compensate his departure, the company started hiring various industry veterans by March 2000. For his executive engagement at Firaxis Games, co-founder and chief executive officer Briggs was named "CEO of the Year" by Smart CEO Magazine in October 2004. Briggs later left the company in November 2006, and was succeeded by Steve Martin. Also for his executive work at Firaxis Games, Martin was awarded the "Maryland International Business Leadership Award" by the World Trade Center Institute in March 2011.

In November 2004, Infogrames, at the time owner of the Civilization franchise and parent to the series' publisher, sold all intellectual property (IP) to an undisclosed buyer for US$22.3 million. The buyer was announced to be Take-Two Interactive on January 26, 2005. The publisher announced that the franchise would be managed by their 2K label, which was founded the day before, and that Firaxis Games would stay in charge of the series' development. In March 2005, NDL announced a partnership with Firaxis Games, wherein their Gamebryo engine would be used for the development of Civilization IV, which was to be released later that year. On November 7, 2005, Take-Two Interactive announced that they had acquired Firaxis Games. Through the deal, Firaxis Games became part of 2K, although its present management and development plans would stay intact. Meier and Briggs both expressed that the acquisition saw a great opportunity for Firaxis Games in terms of creative development and marketing capabilities, and were fortunate to have re-gained full control over the Civilization franchise. In April 2007, Soren Johnson, lead designer on Civilization IV, left the company to move to Maxis and work on Spore. Similarly, Civilization V's lead designer Jon Shafer departed following the game's release, in December 2010.

In August 2014, Firaxis Games announced Firaxicon, a convention dedicated to Firaxis games. The event was held from September 27 to 28, 2014, at a hotel in Hunt Valley, and included meet and greets with the company's staff, a presentation titled "An Evening with Sid Meier", and early playtests of Civilization: Beyond Earth. A tour of Firaxis Games' offices was also held at the event. The event was renewed for a second edition in July 2015, and held on October 3, 2015, at the Baltimore Convention Center. Events were similar to that of the 2014 event, with XCOM 2 and Civilization: Beyond Earth – Rising Tide up for early testing.

By December 2015, Firaxis Games expanded their Sparks headquarters, which they moved to in 2009, to 40,000 square feet (3,700 m^{2}), and employed 40 new staff, totaling to 180 employees present at the company. In June 2016, at the Games for Change festival, Firaxis Games announced that they had partnered with GlassLab to develop CivilizationEDU, an educational derivative of Civilization V optimized for classrooms. On July 23, 2018, David Ismailer of 2K confirmed that Firaxis Games was working on a new IP.

On February 17, 2023, it was announced that Midnight Suns creative director Jake Solomon and longtime Firaxis boss Steve Martin were exiting the company. COO Heather Hazen was promoted to replace Martin. On May 30, 30 employees were laid off from Firaxis as part of cost-saving measures implemented by parent company Take-Two Interactive.

An undisclosed number of Firaxis staff were let go in September 2025, with 2K stating it was part of a move that "restructures and optimizes" the studio for "adaptability, collaboration, and creativity". Another 37 employees were let go in November 2026.
