= Genie Engine =

Game engine developed by Ensemble Studios

- Developer(s): Ensemble Studios
- Initial release: 1997
- Type: game engine
- Website: www.ensemblestudios.com

Age of Empires using the Genie Engine

The Rise of Rome using the Genie Engine

Age of Empires II using the Genie Engine

The Conquerors using the Genie Engine

The Genie Engine is a game engine developed by Ensemble Studios and used in several computer games, such as Age of Empires, Age of Empires II and its expansions (but is not used in other Ensemble Studios games) and Star Wars: Galactic Battlegrounds. Some of those games have been ported to the Apple Mac.

== Development ==
The Genie engine was developed as the basis for Ensemble Studios' first game, Age of Empires which had the development name of "Dawn of Man". The designers received much of their inspiration from the game Civilization, with its proven historical setting; this was noted among reviewers as something positive. Age of Empires was designed by Bruce Shelley, Tony Goodman (in charge of the game's artwork), Dave Pottinger (in charge of the game's artificial intelligence), and Matt Pritchard (in charge of the game's graphics). The game was described as "Civilization II meets Warcraft II" and this shows in the game's engine design. Like Warcraft it is real time strategy but unlike Warcraft and like Civilization II it is historical and has an isometric perspective.

The design team for the sequel, The Age of Kings, intended to complete the game within a year by using code from the original and reusing the game engine. Several months into the process they found they would not be able to complete a game of the quality they sought in that time. Ensemble Studios informed Microsoft they would need another year and instead created Age of Empires: The Rise of Rome, an easily developed expansion pack of Age of Empires, as a compromise which could be released for Christmas 1998. To help meet the next year's deadline, additional programmers, artists, and designers were employed.

The original Age of Empires had been criticized for its artificial intelligence (AI). Because the original AI did not "cheat" by attributing itself extra resources or using other techniques the human player could not, it was easier to defeat than in many other real-time strategy games. For The Age of Kings, Ensemble Studios attempted to develop a more powerful AI system that did not compromise by cheating. Industry veteran Mario Grimani led Ensemble Studios in the creation of the new system. To overcome another significant objection to Age of Empires—that of path finding—the team completely redesigned the game engine's movement system.

The team was less successful in resolving other issues; programmer Matt Pritchard complained following the release of Age of Empires that there was still no process by which patches could be issued. Extensive cheating in multiplayer games of Age of Empires came as a result of several bugs in the game, which resulted in Microsoft promising Ensemble Studios there would be a patch process for The Age of Kings. On release, there were several bugs that needed immediate attention, but the patch process was not yet ready. The first patch was released 11 months later.

Ensemble Studios developed a new terrain system for The Age of Kings, with 3D presentation capabilities that were vastly superior to those of Age of Empires. Pritchard noted an improvement in the team's artistic abilities following their work on the past two games, and he is noted as saying that "AoK became a showcase for their improved talent". However, he complained about the lack of an art asset management tool, while other departments gained new tools and automated procedures to assist in design and play testing.

The Age of Kings saw the introduction of a triggers system for its scenario editor. The triggers allow messages to be displayed, or actions to take place, based on pre-set criteria or "events". The scenario editor was also improved by the new AI system. The AI and trigger systems interacted regularly in the single player campaigns. Numerous upgrades were added in The Conquerors but this was mostly in terms of gameplay and not engine advancements.

Star Wars: Galactic Battlegrounds was developed by LucasArts by licensing the Genie game engine from Ensemble Studios. The game, as well as the Clone Campaigns expansion pack, was designed and directed by Garry M. Gaber.

== Features ==
The Genie Engine has several features that are common across all its games, including a scenario editor, campaigns, LAN, serial and TCP/IP multiplayer, background music amongst others. The engine uses an isometric tile set, unlike other real-time strategy engines such as the one used for Warcraft.

== Games using the Genie Engine ==
Star Wars: Galactic Battlegrounds

- Age of Empires
  - Age of Empires: The Rise of Rome
- Age of Empires: Definitive Edition
- Age of Empires II: The Age of Kings
  - Age of Empires II: The Conquerors
  - Age of Empires II: The Forgotten
  - Age of Empires II: The African Kingdoms
  - Age of Empires II: Rise of the Rajas
- Age of Empires II: Definitive Edition
  - Age of Empires II: Definitive Edition - Lords of the West
  - Age of Empires II: Definitive Edition - Dawn of the Dukes
  - Age of Empires II: Definitive Edition - Dynasties of India
  - Age of Empires II: Definitive Edition - Return of Rome
  - Age of Empires II: Definitive Edition - The Mountain Royals
- Star Wars: Galactic Battlegrounds
  - Star Wars: Galactic Battlegrounds: Clone Campaigns

== Legacy ==
Age of Mythology

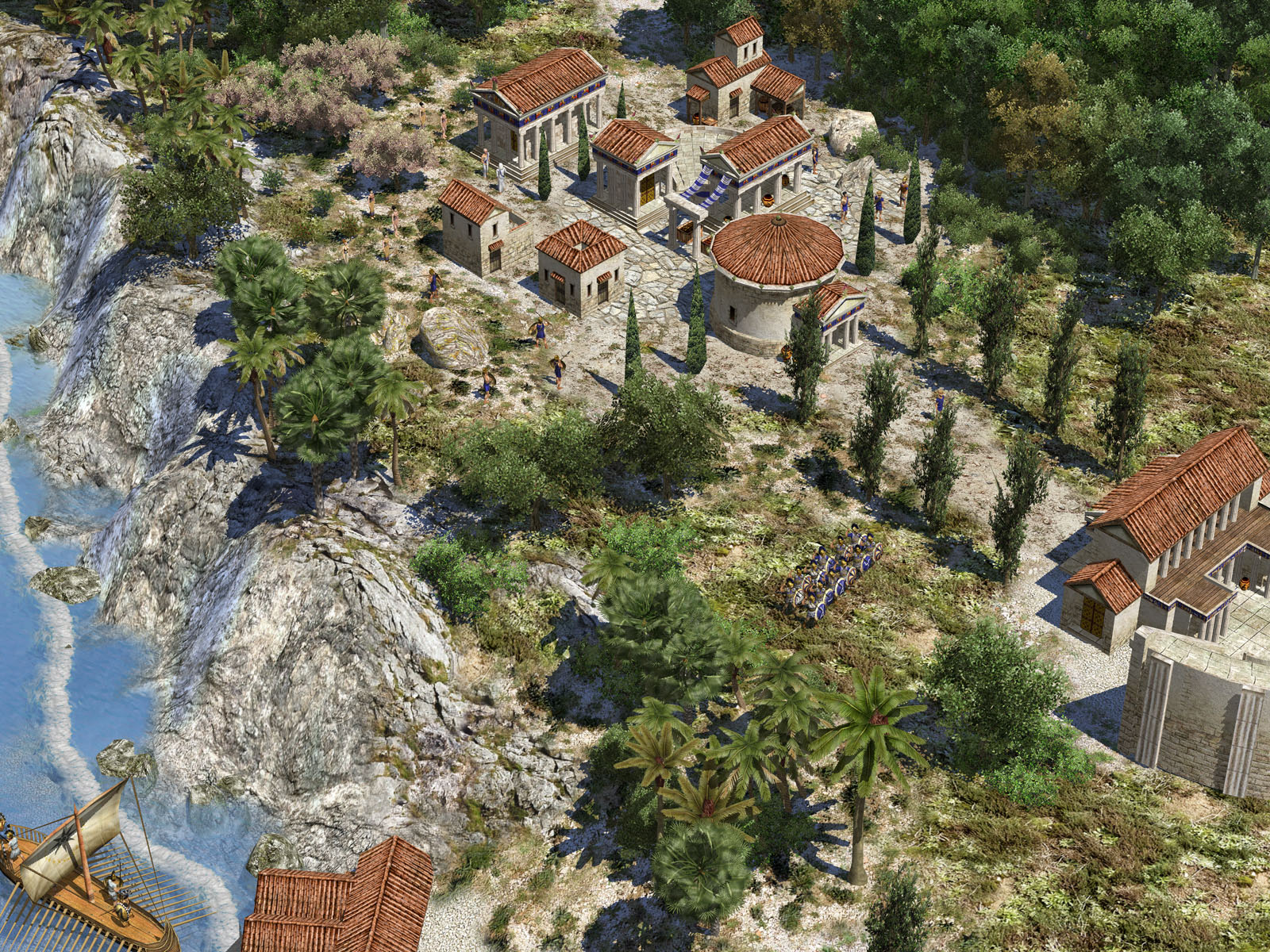
0 A.D.

The games based on the engine have usually been rated highly with Age of Empires having sold over three million copies by 2000 and having an average score of 87% from GameRankings. The Age of Kings was a bigger critical success than the first game, with Game Rankings and Metacritic scores of 92%. The Age of Empires expansions for both games received slightly less praise but were still very well received. Star Wars: Galactic Battlegrounds received generally positive reviews, both from critics and fans. GameRankings gave the game a score of 77%, based on 38 media outlets. However, Galactic Battlegrounds did have vocal critics.

The Genie engine was succeeded by the Age of Mythology engine used by the games in that series as well as Age of Empires III and its expansions. The most significant changes are the updated graphics engine and the inclusion of the Havok physics middleware engine, as well as the introduction of home cities.

The design of the Genie engine has been mirrored in later game titles such as Empire Earth, Cossacks: European Wars, Theocracy, Tzar: Burden of the Crown, and Rise of Nations. Most of these games have also been critically successful. The free software real time strategy game 0 A.D. by Wildfire Games started out as an Age of Empires II modification and boasts many similarities to Age of Empires in its current design on top of its new engine Pyrogenesis. Openage is another free software project trying to create a modern re-implementation of the original Genie Engine using C++ and Python.
