= Dave Pottinger =

American video game programmer

- Born: U.S.
- Occupation: Video game developer

Dave Pottinger is a video game programmer and designer. He formerly worked at Ensemble Studios, where he worked on game engines and AI. He now heads BonusXP, an independent video game studio which has produced two mobile games, and has an RTS game called Servo in Early Access on the Steam platform.

He is a graduate of University of Arizona with a computer engineering degree and has a wife, Kristen.

== Works ==
- 1996, Avarice (Stardock/Continuous Software Systems)
- 1997, Age of Empires
- 1998, Age of Empires: The Rise of Rome
- 1999, Age of Empires II: The Age of Kings
- 2000, Age of Empires II: The Conquerors
- 2002, Age of Mythology
- 2003, Age of Mythology: The Titans
- 2005, Age of Empires III
- 2006, Age of Empires III: The WarChiefs
- 2009, Halo Wars
- 2012, Monster Crew
- 2015, Servo
- 2019, Stranger Things 3: The Game
- 2020, The Dark Crystal: Age of Resistance Tactics
