= Age of Empires (video game) =

1997 real-time strategy video game

- Windows cover art
- Developers: Ensemble Studios; Definitive Edition: Forgotten Empires; Tantalus Media
- Publishers: Microsoft; Definitive Edition: Microsoft Studios
- Director: Bruce Shelley
- Designers: Brian Sullivan; Rick Goodman
- Programmers: Angelo Laudon; Matt Pritchard
- Artist: Brad Crow
- Composers: Stephen Rippy; David Rippy
- Series: Age of Empires
- Engine: Genie
- Platforms: Microsoft Windows, Windows Mobile, Macintosh
- Release: NA: October 13, 1997; UK: October 23, 1997
- Genre: Real-time strategy
- Modes: Single-player, multiplayer

Age of Empires is a 1997 real-time strategy video game based on the ancient world, developed by Ensemble Studios and published by Microsoft, and the first game in the Age of Empires series. The game uses the Genie Engine, a 2D sprite-based game engine. The game allows the user to act as the leader of an ancient civilization by advancing it through four ages (the Stone, Tool, Bronze, and Iron Ages), gaining access to new and improved units with each advance.

The game received positive reviews, and an expansion pack, titled The Rise of Rome, was released in 1998. The game is now generally regarded as one of the best video games ever made. Both the original Age of Empires and the expansion pack were later released as "The Gold Edition". The first sequel, Age of Empires II, was released in 1999. Age of Empires: Definitive Edition, a remastered version of the game, was released on February 20, 2018.

== Gameplay ==
Age of Empires requires the player to develop a civilization from a handful of hunter-gatherers to an expansive Iron Age Empire. To assure victory, the player must gather resources in order to pay for new units, buildings, and more advanced technology. Resources must be preserved, as no new resources become available as the game progresses; for example, trees that are cut down will not grow back.

Twelve civilizations are available, each with individual sets of attributes, including a varying number of available technologies and units. Each civilization has technologies unique to them, so that no civilization possesses all the technologies possible within the game.

A major component of the game is the advancement through four ages. These are the Stone Age (Mesolithic/Nomad/Paleolithic), the Tool Age (Neolithic/Chalcolithic), the Bronze Age, and the Iron Age. Advancement between ages is researched at the Town Center, and each advancement brings the player new technologies, weapons, and units.

=== Modes ===
A custom scenario: Champa invaders attack the Khmer Empire, which attempts to construct the legendary Angkor Wat.

The game features four single-player campaigns in which the player is required to complete specific objectives. Campaigns are a collection of scenarios which are completed in a linear fashion. The campaigns follow the history of the Egyptian, Greek, Babylonian, and Yamato civilizations; there is also a complete campaign specially made for the demo version that takes place in the Hittite Empire. Aside from the campaigns, there is a game mode called "random map", in which a different map is generated for each new game. Variations of random map, such as the resource-heavy "death match", are also available.

Age of Empires facilitated online and network play with up to 8 people simultaneously. Because the network play is less sophisticated than that of modern games, lag and disconnections often occur. Until June 19, 2006, multiplayer gameplay was supported by Microsoft Gaming Zone. At that point, the Zone abandoned support of most CD-ROM games, including Age of Empires and Age of Empires II: The Age of Kings.

The creation of user-made scenarios or series of scenarios (campaigns) for the game was made possible using the Scenario Builder. This tool is simpler and easier to learn than comparable editors used in more modern games, but it has fewer capabilities as a result. Ensemble Studios used the Scenario Builder to make the single-player campaigns which shipped with the retail game. Various unofficial sites exist where custom scenarios can be submitted and downloaded. In late 2005, it was discovered that by modifying various data files, units present in the beta versions of the game could be made available in the editor. Some obscure units include a spaceship and a hero that changes ownership when units move near it. Through data editing, the rules of unit placement can also be modified. This allows units to be placed on any terrain and on top of other units, which creates new possibilities for design. Other significant discoveries include new terrain templates, a mode to triple each unit's hitpoints and a tool to edit map sizes.

=== Civilizations ===
Players choose to play as one of 12 civilizations: the Assyrians, Babylonians, Choson (Koreans), Egyptians, Greeks, Hittites, Minoans, Persians (Iranians), Phoenicians, Shang (Chinese), Sumerians, and Yamato (Japanese). The civilizations are sorted into four distinct architectural styles, based on East Asian, Mesopotamian, Egyptian, and Greek architecture, which determine their in-game appearance.

=== Technology ===
Technology is researched at specific buildings, to which they are generally related; for example, religious research is done in temples and improved armor is researched in the storage pit. Technological advances come in many categories, such as military upgrades (better arms and armor for units), economic upgrades (increasing the efficiency of resource gathering), religious upgrades (faster conversion rates and more abilities for priests), and infrastructure upgrades (stronger fortifications and more resilient buildings). As basic technology research is completed, more advanced technologies may become available. Some technologies are not available to certain civilizations.

Technology plays a very important role in the strategy of the game. As a civilization progresses through the ages, technology becomes more and more expensive, which makes collecting the necessary resources to research them difficult. As a consequence, balancing the workforce of villagers across the various resources can make the difference between victory and defeat.

==== Units ====
Two armies squaring off, sporting an array of units

Players control a variety of civilian and military units. Most units can be upgraded through research (e.g. faster gathering for villagers, stronger armor for military units, and longer range for archers).

Land-based units are the most prevalent in gameplay. Villagers are the most basic units in Age of Empires. Their primary function is to collect resources, cutting down trees for wood, mining for stone and gold, and hunting, foraging, farming, or fishing to acquire food. Villagers can construct buildings and repair both buildings and naval vessels, and are capable of engaging in hand-to-hand combat when necessary. Priests are non-combat units which can heal allied units or "convert" enemy units (in which case the target unit changes allegiance). Infantry units, such as clubmen, swordsmen, and hoplites use melee combat to attack at short range. Mounted units include chariots, cavalry, and war elephants. Archers, mounted or on foot, attack at range. Siege units are of two types: catapults and ballista. Catapults hurl stones which generate blast damage, affecting all units in a small area, and are especially effective against buildings and groups of units. The ballista is less damaging against buildings and units, but it fires faster and is cheaper than the catapult.

Nautical units often play a secondary role, but can be essential to victory. Fishing boats are similar to villagers in that they can gather fish. Merchant ships trade resources from the stockpile and exchange it for gold at another player's dock, with the amount of gold earned being relative to the distance between both docks. Transport ships carry land units from one area of land to another. As well as attacking enemy ships, warships can be very effective in attacking land-based units close to the shoreline (because melee units cannot fight back). Warships come either as galleys which fire arrows or triremes which launch bolts or boulders (very effective against buildings near the shoreline).

Unit types are identical, regardless of civilization (though certain civilizations may have improved variations of these units). So, for example, a Korean Choson broad swordsman is identical to a Persian or Phoenician one, as are bowmen, axemen, short swordsmen, cavalry, and so forth. Some armors and clothes are historically inaccurate, with the long swordsman bearing more resemblance to a Roman praetorian. Some units were also available in the game to civilizations that never, historically, had them; hoplites can be trained by every civilization except Persia, and some middle-Asian civilizations can train Legions and Centurions, while Japanese Yamato can build triremes.

==== Buildings ====
The four different wonders for each of the four architectural styles

The Town Center is one of the most important buildings in the game. Here villagers are created, and age advancement is researched. Most scenarios have each player begin with a single Town Center; the ability to build multiple Town Centers is unlocked by the construction of the Government Center during the Bronze Age. The Town Center provides population support for four units. In order to build more units, houses must be constructed. Each house supports four units, and although any number of houses can be built, they can only support a maximum of fifty units.

Military units are produced at specific buildings relevant to their area. All sea units are created at the docks. Walls and towers are defensive fortifications (Age of Empires was one of the first real-time strategy games to include walls strong enough to form a feasible means of defense). Farms are used to produce food. Granaries, storage pits, and the Town Center are used to store resources deposited by the villagers.

Wonders are enormous monuments representing the architectural achievements of the time, such as the Egyptian Pyramids. They require huge amounts of resources to build and are constructed very slowly. Wonders can neither produce units nor conduct research. In scenarios with Standard Victory conditions, a player can win by constructing a wonder and keeping it from being destroyed for 2,000 years (about 10 minutes in the real world). Building a wonder also greatly increases a player's score, which is beneficial in "score" games. Players typically make it their top priority to destroy enemy wonders, especially under Standard Victory conditions. For this reason and because a wonder is relatively easy to destroy, a wonder must be well-guarded at all times.

== Development ==
Age of Empires (under the working title Dawn of Man) was the first game developed by Ensemble Studios. Its historical setting was chosen to be more plausible and accessible, particularly to casual gamers, than existing games. At the time, other real-time strategy games had science fiction and fantasy settings, so the historical setting of Age of Empires enabled it to stand out. The designers received much of their inspiration from the game Civilization, with its proven historical setting; this was noted among reviewers as something positive. The game was announced in June 1996 at the Electronic Entertainment Expo. Age of Empires was designed by Bruce Shelley, Rick Goodman, Tony Goodman (in charge of the game's artwork), and Dave Pottinger (in charge of the game's artificial intelligence). Stephen Rippy was the music director (a role he kept through the series), with occasional help from his brother, David Rippy. He created the original music in Age of Empires using sounds from actual instruments from the periods in the game, as well as their digital samples. The tunes were the result of extensive research on the cultures, styles, and instruments used.

Angelo Laudon served as the coding lead and Matt Pritchard led graphics and optimisation. While developed mainly in Visual C++, the drawing core of Age of Empires consisted of roughly 13,000 lines of hand-written x86 32-bit assembly code. This was done so that sprites could be loaded faster which was faster than other RTS rivals like StarCraft.

The game was developed in two and a half years by 25 people.

=== The Rise of Rome ===
Age of Empires: The Rise of Rome is an expansion pack for Age of Empires. It is based on the rise of the Roman Empire, and adds the Roman Empire and three other playable civilizations to Age of Empires. It was officially released on October 22, 1998.

Gameplay-wise, the expansion introduced numerous interface tweaks, such as unit queuing, the ability to double click a single unit and highlight others of the same unit-type, balancing damage done by catapults, and the option to increase the population limit beyond 50 (only in multiplayer games). By installing the 1.0a update from 1999, it is also possible to use the period key to cycle through idle villagers. The Rise of Rome also features a new Roman architectural design, shared by all four new civilizations, the Romans, Palmyrans, Macedonians, and Carthaginians. Four new researchable technologies have been added. Additional new features include five new units, four new random map types, and a larger map size option. Pathfinding for all units is also considerably improved. New music was composed for this expansion, which replaced the original score entirely. After the last official patch by the developer, the game's community continued the support by an own-made unofficial patch to address remaining issues and to improve compatibility with modern hardware and OSes.

According to Microsoft, The Rise of Rome demo received one million downloads from its official website alone by April 1999, and another 350,000 from CNET's Download.com. Sales of the game reached 1.2 million copies by June 2001. The Rise of Rome won Computer Games Strategy Plus's 1998 "Add-On of the Year" award. The editors wrote that it "added whole new campaigns, refined rules, and a fresh new gaming experience for a title that was already highly regarded."

=== Age of Empires II - The Return of Rome ===
A DLC expansion for the remastered version of the game's sequel received an expansion on May 16, 2023 titled The Return of Rome. This permitted for an alternate game mode in which the civilisations and technologies of the original game could be played, utilising the system and 'quality of life' mechanics of the sequel.

== Reception ==
=== Sales ===
In the United States, Age of Empires debuted at #7 on PC Data's computer game sales rankings for October 1997. It secured places eighth and 13th the following two months, respectively. By the end of 1997, Age of Empires totaled sales in the country above 178,000 units, for revenues in excess of $8 million. This performance made it the United States' most successful real-time strategy game during late 1997: a writer for PC Gamer US noted that its sales surpassed the combined totals of rivals Total Annihilation and Dark Reign over the same period, and were over four times greater than those of Myth: The Fallen Lords.

Age of Empires was also successful worldwide, according to Microsoft. It was released in 55 countries during its first four months, and over 650,000 copies were shipped globally by December 12. Microsoft reported that it was consistently the top-selling computer strategy title in the United States, France, Germany, and the United Kingdom through January 1998. Globally, the game sold-through 850,000 units by February the same year.

Age of Empires was a hit in the German market, where it debuted at #1 on Media Control's sales rankings for the latter half of October 1997. After holding this position in the first half of November, it remained in Media Control's top 5 through the end of 1997. The following year, Age of Empires placed consistently in the top 3 through March, when it rose again to #1 in the last two weeks of the month. By the end of May, it had spent 28 consecutive weeks in Media Control's top rankings, with placements of fifth and eighth that month. Age of Empires proceeded to become the fourth-best-selling computer game in the German market during 1998's first nine months. It received a "Gold" award from the Verband der Unterhaltungssoftware Deutschland (VUD) in August, for sales of at least 100,000 units across Germany, Austria, and Switzerland. Sales in the German market totaled 115,000 units by the end of September, and the VUD raised Age of Empires to "Platinum" status, for 200,000 sales, by November. At the 1999 Milia festival in Cannes, Age of Empires took home a "Gold" prize for revenues above €15 million in the European Union during 1998. It remained at 14th on Media Control's charts for the German region by January 1999, continuing a 60-week streak on the charts.

Sales of the game in South Korea alone reached roughly 150,000 units by 2000. According to PC Data, it was the United States' 10th-best-selling computer game during the January–November 1998 period. Age of Empires was a commercial success, selling 3 million copies by 2000 and grossing $120 million in revenue.

=== Critical reviews ===
Reception

Aggregate scores
Aggregator	Score
GameRankings	87%
Metacritic	83/100

Review scores
Publication	Score
AllGame	4.5/5
Computer Gaming World	4.5/5
Computer and Video Games	9/10
GameRevolution	B+
GameSpot	6.8/10
IGN	7/10
Next Generation	4/5
PC Zone	9.4/10
PC Gameworld	91%
Coming Soon Magazine	90%
Game Vortex	75%

Age of Empires was generally well received by critics, and scored highly on review aggregator websites including an 83 out of 100 on Metacritic, an 87% on GameRankings, an 85 out of 100 on MobyGames.

Game Informer ranked it the 81st best game made in its 100th issue in 2001. They called it a cross between Warcraft and SimCity and praised its multiplayer and its popularity among gamers. Game Revolution categorized the game as "a cross between Civilization II and Warcraft II: Tides of Darkness", while GameSpot lamented that it was "a simple combat game rather than a glorious empire-builder", describing it as "Warcraft with a hint of Civilization." While Computer Gaming World's Elliott Chin compared the game extensively to Warcraft II, he said that it has "great depth, and when compared to its real-time brethren, it has to be the most sophisticated of the bunch". GameVortex wanted less of a combat-oriented gameplay, but praised the modes of play, commenting that "the random map generation [...] really keeps the game spiced up." GameSpot decried the level of micromanagement necessary to control the game (which was due to absence of production queues and low AI of the player's units) calling it "a poor idea", which "seriously diminishes [Age of Empires'] enjoyability." GameVortex echoed this criticism, while PC Gameworld pointed out the subsequently released patches improving some of the faulty AI programming. Elliott Chin criticized the game's population limit, which he thought to be its "most serious grievance".

While noting the similarities with Warcraft II, PC Gameworld praised the uniqueness of each playable civilization, and noted that the "graphics are extremely detailed and have a hand-painted feel to them. It's rare to see a game this beautiful with such detailed unit movements." Game Revolution was impressed by the amount of different units of the game, and noted that the developers "obviously did [their] research here, and the result is a well rounded, historically accurate product (at least for a game)". The soundscape of the game was also criticized, with GameVortex stating that "the oral clues just aren't enough to let you differentiate just what's going on." With a view to the future of the game, Game Revolution emphasized the scenario editor, which "allows you total control in the design of scenarios and campaigns", a "tool at your disposal to create a scenario exactly to your liking."

Next Generation reviewed the PC version of the game, rating it four stars out of five, and stated that "Having been in development for nearly an eternity, Age of Empires has largely delivered what was promised by Civilization co-creator, Bruce Shelley, and his team at Ensemble Studios."

The game won numerous awards, including Gamecenter's 1997 "Game of the Year", and tied with StarCraft for "PC Strategy Game of the Year" at AIAS' inaugural Interactive Achievement Awards (it also received nominations for "Computer Entertainment Title of the Year" and "Interactive Title of the Year"). Age of Empires was a runner-up for Computer Gaming World's 1997 "Strategy Game of the Year" award, which ultimately went to Myth: The Fallen Lords.

== Definitive Edition ==
In June 2017, Adam Isgreen, creative director of Microsoft Studios announced Age of Empires: Definitive Edition at the Electronic Entertainment Expo 2017. New features include overhauled graphics with support for 4K resolution, a remastered soundtrack, online multiplayer through Xbox Live servers, and other gameplay improvements, such as better pathfinding. It was initially planned to be released on October 19, 2017, but was delayed until February 20, 2018. Development of the game was handled in partnership with Forgotten Empires and Tantalus Media. Age of Empires: Definitive Edition was released at first exclusively through the Windows Store and met with mixed or average reviews, with a weighted score of 69 out of 100 in Metacritic. PC Gamer gave the game 60/100, calling the game "solid remake of a game past its time". GameSpot gave the game 6/10, praising its 4K graphics and upgraded soundtrack, but criticizing old problems still persisting.

In May 2019, Phil Spencer, head executive of Microsoft's Xbox division announced a reversal of the decision to release Age of Empires products exclusively through Windows Store and committed to releasing them on Steam as well. On August 19, 2019, Age of Empires: Definitive Edition was released with a new client on both the Windows Store and Steam, with cross-play available between the two platforms. Existing Windows Store players needed to manually download the new client in order to receive game updates and multiplayer compatibility. At the same time, Age of Empires: Definitive Edition has also become available through Xbox Game Pass for PC.
