= Tony Goodman =

Co-founder of Ensemble Studios and Robot Entertainment

- Other name: Tony Allen Goodman
- Known for: Video game development

Tony Goodman is an American video game executive and entrepreneur. He is the co-founder of Ensemble Studios and Robot Entertainment.

== Ensemble Corporation ==
In 1989, Tony Allen Goodman founded Ensemble Corporation, an information technology consulting firm based in Dallas, Texas with friends John Boog-Scott, John Calhoun, and Thad Chapman. The company "developed its own management and reporting software suite named Command Center, among other products" and quickly grew. Under Goodman's leadership, Ensemble Corporation was one of America's fastest-growing companies ranked by the Inc. 500 from 1992–1997, growing to more than 100 employees. The company was ranked #339 in the Inc. 500 in its final year of independence, 1997. Ensemble Corporation was then acquired on 6 April 1998 by USWeb Corporation., however Goodman had started a side project that wasn't included in the deal in 1995, called Ensemble Studios.

== Ensemble Studios ==
In January 1995 while CEO of Ensemble Corporation, Goodman co-founded Ensemble Studios together with his brother Rick Goodman and John Boog-Scott, while running Ensemble Corporation. Ensemble Studios was formally incorporated in February 1996 and Goodman was CEO and art director while running the business side of both Ensemble companies with Boog-Scott. After the acquisition of Ensemble Corporation, Goodman stayed with the game-focused spin-off to pursue his passion for games. Soon thereafter, Goodman hired Bruce Shelley, a longtime friend, whom he "met at a board game club at the University of Virginia"

Ensemble Studios released two full titles and two expansions during this period: Age of Empires (1997); Age of Empires: The Rise of Rome (1998); Age of Empires II: The Age of Kings (1999); Age of Empires II: The Conquerors (2000).

On 1 May 2001 Microsoft acquired Ensemble Studios as well as the company's intellectual property. Stuart Moulder, general manager of the Games Division at Microsoft commented on the acquisition stating, "The depth of talent and the leadership of Tony Goodman is a winning combination, and this acquisition will help strengthen our mutual commitment to remaining a PC games industry leader."

== Microsoft Years ==
While at Microsoft, Goodman was the studio director at Ensemble Studios. Goodman was in this role until the studio was closed by Microsoft on 29 January 2009 following the completion of Halo Wars. "After the closure, the Ensemble leadership team will form a new studio and has agreed to provide ongoing support for Halo Wars as well as work on other projects with Microsoft Game Studios.

During this period, the studio shipped five titles: Age of Mythology (2002), Age of Mythology: The Titans (2003), Age of Empires III (2005), Age of Empires III: The WarChiefs (2006), Age of Empires III: The Asian Dynasties (2007), and Halo Wars (2009).

Goodman, "left behind a tradition of entrepreneurship." Goodman founded Robot Entertainment the next month. Several startups arose from the ashes, spearheaded by former employees, including Bonfire Studios, Newtoy, Windstorm Studios, Pixelocity, Fuzzy Cube, and GRL Games."

== Robot Entertainment ==
In 2009, Goodman was the founding CEO of Robot Entertainment when the company defined its strategy to work on smaller original IP titles. Robot finished up the work on Halo Wars after the closing of Ensemble Studios and was the original developer of Age of Empires Online. In February 2009, days after Robot Entertainment was announced, Goodman presented his old friend, Bruce Shelley with the AIAS Hall of Fame Award at the 2009 DICE Summit in Las Vegas.

Goodman left Robot Entertainment to pursue a new venture in the games industry in mid-2010. Goodman was quoted as saying, "My contributions as CEO at Robot were completed after we successfully transitioned from a vision to a flourishing game studio."

== PeopleFun ==
On 17 July 2012, Goodman announced the founding of his newest company, PeopleFun (stylized as peoplefün), along with John Boog-Scott, co-founder of Ensemble Corporation and Ensemble Studios, Angelo Laudon, who was employee No. 1 at Ensemble Studios and lead programmer on the Age of Empires engine; and Leon Campise, a serial entrepreneur in the technology space.

PeopleFun will focus on making games for iOS and Android that are character driven franchises instead of large games such as those created at Ensemble.

On 13 September 2012, PeopleFun launched its first mobile game, Word Chums, a word game for iPhone, iPad and iPod Touch devices. The game is the first appearance of the character franchise "The Chums".
