= Age of Mythology =

2002 video game

- Developers: Ensemble Studios (Note: Extended Edition developed by SkyBox Labs and Forgotten Empires.); Westlake Interactive (OS X)
- Publishers: Microsoft Game Studios; MacSoft (OS X)
- Director: Tony Goodman
- Producer: David Rippy
- Designers: Ian M. Fischer; Bruce Shelley
- Programmer: Robert Fermier
- Artists: Lance Hoke; David Cherry
- Composers: Stephen Rippy; Kevin McMullan
- Engine: BANG!
- Platforms: Microsoft Windows, OS X
- Release: NA: October 31, 2002; EU: November 14, 2002
- Genre: Real-time strategy
- Modes: Single-player, multiplayer

Age of Mythology is a 2002 real-time strategy video game developed by Ensemble Studios and published by Microsoft Game Studios for Microsoft Windows and Mac OS X. A spin-off of the Age of Empires series, Age of Mythology takes some of its inspiration from mythology and legends of the Greeks, Egyptians, and Norse, rather than from actual historical events. Many gameplay elements are similar to the Age of Empires series, while mythological creatures and supernatural powers move it beyond the realm of realism. Its campaign follows an Atlantean admiral, Arkantos, who is forced to travel through the lands of the game's three cultures, hunting for a cyclops who is in league with Poseidon against Atlantis.

Age of Mythology was commercially successful, going platinum four months after its release after selling over one million units. In 2003, it was followed by an expansion pack, Age of Mythology: The Titans. A board game adaptation, titled Age of Mythology: The Boardgame, was released in 2003 by Eagle Games. On May 8, 2014, Age of Mythology: Extended Edition was released for Windows via Steam. This was followed by a second expansion pack, Age of Mythology: Tale of the Dragon, released on January 28, 2016. On September 4, 2024, a remaster, Age of Mythology: Retold, was released.

== Gameplay ==
In this screenshot, an Egyptian town under attack by the Norse, defending itself using the meteor god power.

Like many other real-time strategy games, Age of Mythology is based on defeating enemy units and towns, building one's own units and towns, and training villagers and fighters. In this way, players are able to defeat and conquer rival towns and civilizations. Players advance their tribe through four "Ages": starting in the Archaic Age, the player may upgrade to the Classical Age, the Heroic Age, and finally, the Mythic Age. Each upgrade to a higher Age unlocks new units and technologies for the player, which strengthens their settlement. However, upgrading requires a sum of resources to be paid and a certain prerequisite building to be constructed.

There are three playable cultures in Age of Mythology: the Greeks, Egyptians, and Norse. Each culture has three "major gods"—important deities such as Zeus, Ra, or Odin. The player chooses their major god before the game begins. Every time a player advances to the next age, a "minor god" is selected. Minor gods are slightly less significant historically than their major counterparts. Some minor gods include Bast and Aphrodite. All gods grant the player unique technologies, myth units, and a unique "god power"—A one-time special ability that can either damage an opponent, or benefit the player that uses it.

There are four major resources in Age of Mythology: food, wood, gold, and favor; unlike previous games by Ensemble Studios, this game does not include the stone resource. Resources can be used to train units, construct buildings, and research technologies, among other things. Civilian units—namely, the Greek villagers, the Norse gatherers and dwarfs, the Egyptian laborers, and fishing boats—are used to gather resources. Hunting animals, gathering berries, harvesting livestock, farming, and fishing are all methods by which food can be gathered. Wood is gathered only by chopping down trees, and gold is gathered from either gold mines or from trade. Players can purchase upgrades that increase the rate of gathering these resources. Favor is acquired in different ways by different cultures: Greek players gain it by having villagers pray at temples; Egyptian players earn it by building monuments; and Norse players receive it by fighting/hunting animals or by possessing heroes. Resources can be exchanged at a player's market, with the exception of favor.

=== Units ===
Every unit in the game takes up between one and five "population slots". Building additional houses or Town Centers—the main building in a player's town—increases the population capacity, up to a maximum of 300.

Units can be classified into seven categories; infantry, archers, cavalry—the three of which are broadly classified as human units—siege units, naval units, heroes, and myth units (monsters and other creatures from mythology). The rock-paper-scissors model governs most units in battle. For example, infantry does additional damage to cavalry, cavalry does additional damage to archers, and archers do additional damage to infantry. The same rock-paper-scissors formation exists in the three different types of naval units—arrow ships, siege ships, and hammer ships. Siege units are generally exempt from the rock-paper-scissors model but are instead able to destroy buildings easily while being vulnerable to cavalry attacks. Heroes are extremely effective against myth units, which in turn do large amounts of damage against human units. Heroes are also able to collect relics, which grant the player additional economic or military bonuses when deposited in a player's temple. Most units can be upgraded, making them better at certain tasks.

=== Buildings ===
Buildings in Age of Mythology can generally be split into three categories: economic, military, and defensive. The most important economic building is the Town Center, which is similar to the building of the same name in the Age of Empires series games. Most civilian units are trained at the Town Center, as are some improvements. Most importantly, players advance Age via the building. The Town Center provides 15 population slots, and building additional houses will earn the player 10 additional slots per house. In the Heroic Age, players may claim settlements (unclaimed Town Centres) for additional population slots. In some cases owning all town centres will trigger a countdown to victory. Other economic buildings include the farm and market.

Buildings are able to research improvements, as well as provide resources for the player. All units except civilians and myth units are trained at military buildings. These buildings differ in name and purpose between culture, but all are able to train similar units. Military buildings are also used to research military specific technologies, such as armor upgrades, and attack improvements.

Walls and towers are defensive structures, which are not able to train units, and are used only for the purposes of defense. They are able to research some upgrades, although these are generally only useful to the building performing the research. Another type of building available to players is a Wonder: a grand building that represents an architectural achievement of the civilization. In certain game modes, once a player builds a wonder, a ten-minute countdown begins. If the wonder is still standing after the countdown ends, the player who built the wonder wins.

=== Scenario editor ===
The Age of Mythology scenario editor: visible is a large statue surrounded by deep water and the "rotate camera angle" controls, which allow for construction of more complex custom scenarios.

The Age of Mythology editor is far more advanced than that of its predecessor, the Age of Empires II scenario editor. In addition to standard unit placement facilities, the editor allows units to be overlapped, and it facilitates for large mountains, and steep terrain. Triggers, a popular aspect of scenario design in Age of Empires II, are also present in Age of Mythology's editor, as well as cinematics and other special effects.

=== Campaign ===
Unlike the campaign modes in Age of Empires and Age of Empires II, Age of Mythology only has one central campaign, Fall of the Trident. The campaign is significantly longer than campaigns in previous games, with a total of 32 scenarios.

=== Multiplayer ===
Age of Mythology included unlimited free multiplayer accounts on ESO. As of December 2011, it is no longer possible to create new accounts but access to already created ones is still possible. Similar in function to Blizzard Entertainment's Battle.net, ESO allows players to play matches, as well as chat with other players.

In multiplayer games, there are seven different game types available, all of which are provided as standard with the game: Supremacy—the standard game mode—includes randomly generated map and all gameplay aspects; Conquest is similar to Supremacy, but victory is only possible by defeating all other players; in Deathmatch players begin the game with high resources, but the game is otherwise the same as Supremacy; in Lightning, the gameplay is identical to Supremacy, but the game plays at twice the normal speed; in Nomad mode, players start with one civilian unit, and no Town Center, and must build up on a settlement; the goal of King of the Hill is to control a monument in the center of the map for a set period of time; and in Sudden Death, a player loses if their Town Center is destroyed, and they fail to rebuild it within a set period of time.

Multiplayer tournaments and LAN parties are popular throughout the world, with many players visiting computer gaming lounges to participate.

== Campaign synopsis ==
Atlantean admiral and war hero Arkantos finds himself leaving his home of Atlantis and his son Kastor, in order to pursue the minotaur Kamos, who raids his homeland to steal a trident from a statue of Poseidon. Whilst Kamos manages to escape, Arkantos recovers the trident and returns it home, before proceeding on the instructions of the Atlantean council to assist the Greek king Agamemnon in the Trojan War. Aided by the heroes Ajax and Odysseus, his Atlantean forces eventually win the war against Troy through the use of a Trojan Horse. Leaving Troy, Ajax accompanies Arkantos to Ioklos as he seek assistance in repairing his ships, only to find the city occupied and its people enslaved by an army led by Gargarensis, a cyclops warlord, and Kemsyt, an Egyptian priest.

Rescuing the city's guardian, the centaur Chiron, the pair are led by him to a dig site which the enslaved citizens are working at. Finding the site hides an entrance to the underworld of Erebus, the group venture below and discover Gargarensis attempting to break open a large metal door. Believing this must not happen, the group use their forces to destroy the ram, prompting the cyclops to entrap them within Erebus. After searching the underworld for another way out, Arkantos comes across a series of temples dedicated to Poseidon, Zeus, and Hades. When he finds his prayers to Poseidon unanswered, Chiron suggests to him to pray for Zeus' blessing, which leads to the Greek god showing favor by providing the group with a route to the surface.

Travelling out of Erebus, the group find themselves in the deserts of Egypt, where they befriend Amanra, a Nubian leader seeking to revive Osiris following his death at the hands of Set. The group learn Kemsyt seeks to prevent this, and so work with Amanra to find the pieces of Osiris' body scattered across Egypt. During their search for the first piece, Arkantos is visited by the goddess Athena in his dreams, who reveals that the incident in Erebus was being influenced by Kronos, one of the Titans who ruled over Earth until Zeus imprisoned them. Seeking his freedom, Kronos is influencing Poseidon and Gargarensis to find the Tarturus gates, adamantine doors that seal the Titans' in their prison and break them open, in exchange for granting them what they most desire. Athena pleads with Arkantos to stop this from happening, as Zeus cannot involve himself without starting a war amongst the gods.

After securing the first piece, Arkantos learns from an Egyptian pharaoh that Osiris' pyramid guards another Tarturus gate, prompting him and his allies to split up and find the remaining pieces. Each successfully recover the missing pieces, with Arkantos confronting and killing Kamos for aiding Gargarensis. Managing to restore Osiris, the Egyptian god thwarts Gargarensis' plan by sealing access to the gate under his pyramid, and forcing him and Kemsyt to flee Egypt. Following their escape, Chiron reveals to the others that he encountered Norsemen from the Norselands during their search, who reveals the cyclops' army are seeking to invoke Ragnarok in their homeland, leading Arkantos to lead their forces north.

Arriving in the frozen Norselands, Arkantos and his friends encounter Brokk and Eitri, two dwarven brothers, who they help with reclaiming a dwarven forge in exchange for a safe route to Midgard. Proceeding deeper into the Norselands, the group are tricked by Loki, who they learn is aiding Gargarensis. Aided by the valkyrie Reginleif, who sent the Norsemen to Egypt, they eventually find the next Tartarus gate within the Norse underworld Niflheim, whereupon Chiron sacrifices himself to stop a horde of fire giants pursuing his friends. Needing to prevent the gate from being opened by another battering ram, Arkantos is surprised when Brokk and Eitri turn up with pieces of Thor's hammer, which Loki had attempted to destroy. Reforging it anew, the group witness Thor reclaim it and use its power to seal the gate.

Pursuing Gargarensis to the surface, Arkantos receives fresh reinforcements from Odysseus, allowing their forces to capture the cyclops, with Ajax beheading him. As the heroes return to Atlantis, they become shocked when they find Loki had deceived them, after finding Kemsyt's head in the place of Gargarensis. Arkantos realizes that the cyclops is heading for Atlantis, which houses one final Tarturus gate, and fears for the worst. Upon arriving on Atlantis' shores, the group discover the main city occupied and fortified, with Poseidon having possessed a colossal statue to guard it. Fighting to retake the city, Arkantos discovers Poseidon and Gargarensis are too powerful, and so orders a wonder to Zeus to be built in order to beseech the god's help.

In response to his actions, Zeus gives Arkantos god-like powers to tackle Poseidon, while the others, led by Kastor, evacuate the Atlanteans from the city. With his new powers, Arkantos sacrifices himself to destroys the statue, causing it to kill Gargarensis in its destruction, whilst also plunging Atlantis beneath the ocean to ensure the gate beneath it is sealed forever. Whilst Kastor and the others mourn his loss, Athena revives him, rewarding his heroism by elevating Arkantos as a new god.

=== The Golden Gift ===
An official campaign, The Golden Gift, was released as a download on Microsoft's website. The campaign follows the adventures of Brokk and Eitri, the dwarves who appeared in the initial campaign. The plot unfolds with both dwarves planning to create a giant golden boar as an offering to the Norse god Freyr. While working separately, Brokk is approached by Skult (also from Fall of the Trident) who warns him that Eitri is making preparations to create the boar without his brother, of which Eitri is also told the same about Brokk. As both brothers race to complete the boar in the great forge, Skult steals the finished piece and holds it in Loki's fortress. The brothers eventually assault the base, and the boar is retrieved and successfully offered to Freyr.

== Development ==
Ensemble Studios began work on their first fully 3D engine at the same time as their development of Age of Empires II: The Age of Kings. Named the BANG! Engine, this was announced in January 2001, for use in a new game, codenamed RTSIII. RTSIII was eventually revealed as Age of Mythology. In developing Age of Mythology, Ensemble Studios decided to move away from the center of the Age of Empires series history, to avoid becoming stale and repetitive. This allowed them to work with new ideas and concepts.

Following the announcement of the game for September 2002, a trial version was released. It contained five scenarios of the game's campaign, and two random maps. In the trial version, the player can only select Zeus, but there are nine gods available in the full version of the game. There was debate during Age of Mythology's construction concerning the unbalanced nature of god powers and how to make them "fair" while still maintaining an element of fun in them. It was concluded that the best way to make it fair for everyone was to limit the use of god powers to one a game. Age of Mythology underwent a large amount of beta-testing during its developmental phase, as Ensemble Studios attempted to create a more balanced and competitive game than its predecessors. Greg T. Street commented that one of the reasons Age of Mythology became so popular was because the development team spent many hours working on the game through active testing, rather than just taking advice from a "faceless drone in another building".

=== Music ===
The official soundtrack was released on October 22, 2002, under the record label "Sumthing Else". The score was written by Stephen Rippy and Kevin McMullan. Rippy cites musicians such as Peter Gabriel, Tuatara, Bill Laswell, Talvin Singh and Tchad Blake as inspirations for the soundtrack. The musical work done on Age of Mythology was unlike anything Rippy had done before; an example of this was "writing for a seventy-piece orchestra and then flying out to Washington to record it".

Music 4 Games' reviewer, Jay Semerad, praised Age of Mythology's soundtrack. He summarized his review by declaring: "In all, the Age of Mythology soundtrack is an experience that should not be missed. It's easily one of my favorite soundtracks from this past year." Semerad was also astonished, and appreciative, of the use of instruments such as the ney flute, tabla and toy piano, all of which he said produced "some innovative analog and synthesized electronic effects". His only critique was that at times some of the background melodies were "bound to a simple harmonization", and lacking any "real bold or innovative purpose".

== Expansions and other versions ==
=== The Titans ===
Age of Mythology: The Titans is an expansion to Age of Mythology, released on September 30, 2003. The expansion added a new culture, the Atlanteans, as well as several new units, including titans. Critics and fans received the expansion with enthusiasm, although its ratings were slightly lower on average than those of the original version.

=== Mythologies ===
Age of Empires: Mythologies is a spin-off of Age of Empires: The Age of Kings, but with the unique mythology-based gameplay elements of Age of Mythology. It was developed by Griptonite Games for the Nintendo DS.

=== Extended Edition ===
Age of Mythology: Extended Edition is a compilation that includes the main game and The Titans expansion. It adds Steamworks integration, Twitch support, an enhanced observer mode, native HD widescreen and improved water and lighting. It was released on May 8, 2014. The Extended Edition was developed by SkyBox Labs.

=== Tale of the Dragon ===
On September 18, 2015, a new expansion was announced, Tale of the Dragon. It was co-developed by SkyBox Labs and Forgotten Empires, the latter having worked on new expansions for Age of Empires II. The expansion added a new culture, the Chinese, with the major gods Fuxi, Nüwa, and Shennong. The expansion also features a new campaign and multiplayer maps, as well as other features. It was released on January 28, 2016.

=== Retold ===
Age of Mythology: Retold serves as the Definitive Edition of the Age of Mythology. The game was revealed on October 25, 2022, and was released on September 4, 2024. It was made in Age of Empires III: Definitive Edition's version of the Bang Engine and all units and animations were completely redone.

== Reception ==
In the United States, Age of Mythology sold 870,000 copies and earned $31.9 million by August 2006, after its release in October 2002. It was the country's 10th best-selling computer game between January 2000 and August 2006. Combined sales of the game and its Titans expansion had reached 1.3 million units in the United States by August 2006. Age of Mythology received a "Gold" sales award from the Entertainment and Leisure Software Publishers Association (ELSPA), indicating sales of at least 200,000 copies in the United Kingdom.

=== Critical reception ===
Reception

Aggregate scores
Aggregator	Score
GameRankings	89%
Metacritic	89/100 (Extended Edition) 66/100

Review scores
Publication	Score
Game Informer	9.5/10
GameRevolution	B+
GameSpot	9.2/10
IGN	9.3/10
PC Gamer (US)	86%

Age of Mythology received critical acclaim, reaching an estimated one million units sold within five months of its release. The game received nominations for "Computer Game of the Year" and "Computer Strategy Game of the Year" during the AIAS' 6th Annual Interactive Achievement Awards. GameSpot named Age of Mythology the best computer game of November 2002. It was a runner-up for GameSpot's annual "Best Single-Player Strategy Game on PC" and "Best Multiplayer Strategy Game on PC" awards, which went respectively to Medieval: Total War and Warcraft III.

Age of Mythology's graphics were praised by the majority of reviewers. IGN reviewer Steve Butts stated that "some fantastic effects and believable animations make this one a joy to watch. The differences between the armies and environments are awesome." As such, he gave the graphics a rating of 9 out of 10. Meanwhile, GameSpot reviewer Greg Kasavin also rated the graphics 9 out of 10, stating that "Age of Mythology is a great-looking game, filled with bright colors and carefully detailed animations." Game Revolution also appreciated Age of Mythology's graphics, stating in their review that the "new 3D landscape looks good", and including graphics as one of the positives in the review summary. PC Gamer reviewer William Harms admired the graphics, "The environments, units, and buildings are packed with detail," and excitedly commented on the effects: "What really impressed me, though, were the game's animations. When a Minotaur smacks a dude with his club, the schmoe goes flying, skids on the ground, and then bounces back into the air."

The game's soundtrack was also praised by reviewers, although several commented that it was repetitive and predictable at times. IGN described it as "great, if repetitive, music", whilst Game Revolution declared that the sound "really showcases Ensemble's continued attention to detail", before going on to praise the audio snippets in various languages.

IGN was pleased with Age of Mythology's campaign, and not bothered by its length. Instead, they stated that "the meaningful and engaging single player campaign provides a nearly flawless experience". However, GameSpot was slightly critical of it, claiming that "while some of the campaign missions do feature some unusual circumstances or objectives that change, the game's story isn't incredibly engaging." This was compromised by stating that Age of Empires fans wouldn't expect an amazing campaign; they would "make a beeline for the game's random map mode, anyway". PC Gamer elaborated more on the campaign however, saying: "many of the missions are extremely well-crafted", and that "sprinkled throughout these encounters are moments of genuine comedy — a truly delightful surprise". However, they still found reasons to criticize: "Regrettably, most of AoM's missions suffer from one recurring, frustrating problem: a severe case of 'build base-itis'." The reviewer elaborated: "I know base-building is inherent to the genre, but even the most ardent fan will be put off by just how much there is. What's most disappointing is that AoM's setting really lends itself to imaginative mission design — and I don't think the designers took full advantage of the backdrop, which is a shame."

The editors of Computer Games Magazine named Age of Mythology the fourth-best computer game of 2002, and called it "an amazingly well-balanced game, both in terms of its pacing and its mix of standard historical and fantastical units". It was a nominee for PC Gamer US's "2002 Best Real-Time Strategy Game" award, which ultimately went to Warcraft III: Reign of Chaos.

=== Scientific study ===
Age of Mythology's artificial intelligence (AI) was used by four Austrian researchers—Christoph Hermann, Helmuth Melcher, Stefan Rank, and Robert Trappl—in a study into the value of emotions in real-time strategy games. According to the abstract, "We were interested whether incorporating a simple emotional model to an existing bot-script improves playing strength." The results of the study determined that of the four bots they tested, the neurotic bot was most capable of defeating Age of Mythology's default AI, followed by the aggressive one. Neither bot was defeated by the standard AI, but the neurotic bot won, on average, twenty five percent more rapidly. Plans were made to extend the research in the future by pitting the neurotic bot against a human player.

== See also ==
- List of PC games
