= D.I.C.E. Award for Strategy/Simulation Game of the Year =

Annual award presented by the Academy of Interactive Arts & Sciences

- Country: United States
- Presented by: Academy of Interactive Arts & Sciences
- First award: 1998
- Currently held by: The Alters
- Website: www.interactive.org

The D.I.C.E. Award for Strategy/Simulation Game of the Year is an award presented annually by the Academy of Interactive Arts & Sciences during the D.I.C.E. Awards. This award recognizes games "in which user directs or manipulates resources to create a set of conditions that result in success as determined within the confines of the game. These games can offer the user the chance to simulate or to virtually reproduce an experience, real or imaginary, which would require some form of equipment. Strategy games emphasize the planning of tactics rather than the execution". All active creative/technical, business, and affiliate members of the Academy are qualified to vote for this category. Originally, there were separate awards for strategy games and simulation games, which simulate aspects of the real world.

The award's most recent winner is The Alters, developed and published by 11 Bit Studios.

== History ==
Initially the Interactive Achievement Awards had separate awards for Computer Strategy Game of the Year and Computer Simulation Game of the Year. The categories would then be merged into Strategy/Simulation Game of the Year in 2008.

- Computer Strategy Game of the Year (1998—2004)
- Computer Simulation Game of the Year (1998—2004)
- Strategy Game of the Year (2005—2007)
- Simulation Game of the Year (2005—2007)
- Strategy/Simulation Game of the Year (2008—present)

There was a tie between Age of Empires and StarCraft for Computer Strategy Game of the Year at the 1st Annual Interactive Achievement Awards.

== Winners and nominees ==
=== 1990s ===
Table key
Indicates the winner

Year	Game	Developer(s)	Publisher(s)	Ref.
1997/1998 (1st)	Computer Strategy Game of the Year (Note: Tie between finalists.)			
1997/1998 (1st)	Age of Empires	Ensemble Studios	Microsoft	
1997/1998 (1st)	StarCraft	Blizzard Entertainment	Blizzard Entertainment	
1997/1998 (1st)	Command & Conquer Gold	Westwood Studios	Virgin Interactive	
1997/1998 (1st)	Sid Meier's Gettysburg!	Firaxis Games	Electronic Arts	
1997/1998 (1st)	Total Annihilation	Cavedog Entertainment	Infogrames	
1997/1998 (1st)	Warlords III: Reign of Heroes	Strategic Studies Group	Red Orb Entertainment	
1997/1998 (1st)	Computer Simulation Game of the Year			
1997/1998 (1st)	Microsoft Flight Simulator 98	Microsoft Simulation Group	Microsoft	
1997/1998 (1st)	F-22: Air Dominance Fighter	Digital Image Design	Ocean Software	
1997/1998 (1st)	Jane's F-15	EA Baltimore	Electronic Arts	
1997/1998 (1st)	Jane's Longbow 2	Origin Systems	Electronic Arts	
1997/1998 (1st)	Star Trek: Starfleet Academy	High Voltage Software	Interplay Productions	
1998/1999 (2nd)	Computer Strategy Game of the Year			
1998/1999 (2nd)	Sid Meier's Alpha Centauri	Firaxis Games	Electronic Arts	
1998/1999 (2nd)	Caesar III	Impressions Games	Sierra On-Line	
1998/1999 (2nd)	Close Combat III: The Russian Front	Atomic Games	Microsoft	
1998/1999 (2nd)	MechCommander	FASA Interactive	MicroProse	
1998/1999 (2nd)	SimCity 3000	Maxis	Electronic Arts	
1998/1999 (2nd)	Computer Simulation Game of the Year			
1998/1999 (2nd)	Need for Speed III: Hot Pursuit	EA Canada, EA Seattle	Electronic Arts	
1998/1999 (2nd)	F-22 Total Air War	Digital Image Design	Infogrames	
1998/1999 (2nd)	Descent: FreeSpace — The Great War	Volition	Interplay Productions	
1998/1999 (2nd)	Independence War	Particle Systems	Infogrames	
1998/1999 (2nd)	Jane's WWII Fighters	Electronic Arts	Electronic Arts	
1999/2000 (3rd)	Computer Strategy Game of the Year			
1999/2000 (3rd)	Age of Empires II: The Age of Kings	Ensemble Studios	Microsoft	
1999/2000 (3rd)	Command & Conquer: Tiberian Sun	Westwood Studios	Electronic Arts	
1999/2000 (3rd)	Heroes of Might and Magic III	New World Computing	The 3DO Company	
1999/2000 (3rd)	Homeworld	Relic Entertainment	Sierra On-Line	
1999/2000 (3rd)	RollerCoaster Tycoon	Chris Sawyer Productions	Hasbro Interactive	
1999/2000 (3rd)	Computer Simulation Game of the Year			
1999/2000 (3rd)	Microsoft Flight Simulator 2000	Microsoft Simulation Group	Microsoft	
1999/2000 (3rd)	FreeSpace 2	Volition	Interplay Productions	
1999/2000 (3rd)	Jane's F/A-18	EA Baltimore	Electronic Arts	
1999/2000 (3rd)	MiG Alley	Rowan Software	Empire Interactive	
1999/2000 (3rd)	Star Wars: X-Wing Alliance	Totally Games	LucasArts	

=== 2000s ===
Year	Game	Developer(s)	Publisher(s)	Ref.
2000 (4th)	PC Strategy Game of the Year			
2000 (4th)	Age of Empires II: The Conquerors	Ensemble Studios	Microsoft Games	
2000 (4th)	Command & Conquer: Red Alert 2	Westwood Pacific	Electronic Arts	
2000 (4th)	Sacrifice	Shiny Entertainment	Interplay Entertainment	
2000 (4th)	Zeus: Master of Olympus	Impressions Games	Sierra On-Line	
2000 (4th)	PC Simulation Game of the Year			
2000 (4th)	MechWarrior 4: Vengeance	FASA Interactive	Microsoft Games	
2000 (4th)	Enemy Engaged: RAH-66 Comanche vs. KA-52 Hokum	Razorworks	Empire Interactive	
2000 (4th)	Links 2001	Access Software	Microsoft Games	
2000 (4th)	Need for Speed: Porsche Unleashed	Eden Studios, EA Canada	Electronic Arts	
2000 (4th)	RollerCoaster Tycoon: Loopy Landscapes	MicroProse	Hasbro Interactive	
2001 (5th)	PC Strategy Game of the Year			
2001 (5th)	Sid Meier's Civilization III	Firaxis Games	Infogrames	
2001 (5th)	Battle Realms	Liquid Entertainment, Crave Entertainment	Ubisoft	
2001 (5th)	Black & White	Lionhead Studios	Electronic Arts	
2001 (5th)	Kohan: Immortal Sovereigns	TimeGate Studios	Strategy First	
2001 (5th)	PC Simulation Game of the Year			
2001 (5th)	Microsoft Flight Simulator 2002	Microsoft Simulation Group	Microsoft Game Studios	
2001 (5th)	IL-2 Sturmovik	1C: Maddox Games	Ubisoft	
2001 (5th)	Microsoft Train Simulator	Kuju Entertainment	Microsoft Game Studios	
2002 (6th)	Computer Strategy Game of the Year			
2002 (6th)	Warcraft III: Reign of Chaos	Blizzard Entertainment	Blizzard Entertainment	
2002 (6th)	Age of Mythology	Ensemble Studios	Microsoft Game Studios	
2002 (6th)	Medieval: Total War	Creative Assembly	Activision	
2002 (6th)	Computer Simulation Game of the Year			
2002 (6th)	The Sims: Unleashed	Maxis	Electronic Arts	
2002 (6th)	Combat Flight Simulator 3: Battle for Europe	Aces Game Studio	Microsoft Game Studios	
2002 (6th)	MechWarrior 4: Mercenaries	FASA Studio	Microsoft Game Studios	
2002 (6th)	The Aurora Neverwinter Toolset	BioWare	Infogrames	
2003 (7th)	Computer Strategy Game of the Year			
2003 (7th)	Command & Conquer: Generals	EA Pacific	Electronic Arts	
2003 (7th)	Empires: Dawn of the Modern World	Stainless Steel Studios	Activision	
2003 (7th)	Homeworld 2	Relic Entertainment	Sierra Entertainment	
2003 (7th)	Praetorians	Pyro Studios	Eidos Interactive	
2003 (7th)	Rise of Nations	Big Huge Games	Microsoft Game Studios	
2003 (7th)	Computer Simulation Game of the Year			
2003 (7th)	The Sims: Superstar	Maxis	Electronic Arts	
2003 (7th)	Microsoft Flight Simulator 2004: A Century of Flight	Aces Game Studio	Microsoft Game Studios	
2003 (7th)	IL-2 Sturmovik: Forgotten Battles	1C: Maddox Games	Ubisoft	
2003 (7th)	Trainz Railroad Simulator 2004	Auran	Oteeva	
2004 (8th)	Strategy Game of the Year			
2004 (8th)	Rome: Total War	Creative Assembly	Activision	
2004 (8th)	The Lord of the Rings: The Battle for Middle-earth	EA Los Angeles	Electronic Arts	
2004 (8th)	Warhammer 40,000: Dawn of War	Relic Entertainment	THQ	
2004 (8th)	Simulation Game of the Year			
2004 (8th)	The Sims 2	Maxis	Electronic Arts	
2004 (8th)	Pacific Fighters	1C: Maddox Games	Ubisoft	
2004 (8th)	RollerCoaster Tycoon 3	Frontier Developments	Infogrames	
2005 (9th)	Strategy Game of the Year			
2005 (9th)	Civilization IV	Firaxis Games	2K Games	
2005 (9th)	Age of Empires III	Ensemble Studios	Microsoft Game Studios	
2005 (9th)	Empire Earth II	Mad Doc Software	Vivendi Universal Games	
2005 (9th)	Simulation Game of the Year			
2005 (9th)	The Movies	Lionhead Studios	Activision	
2005 (9th)	Animal Crossing: Wild World	Nintendo EAD	Nintendo	
2005 (9th)	Silent Hunter III	Ubisoft Bucharest	Ubisoft	
2006 (10th)	Strategy Game of the Year			
2006 (10th)	Company of Heroes	Relic Entertainment	THQ	
2006 (10th)	Medieval II: Total War	Creative Assembly	Sega	
2006 (10th)	Rise of Nations: Rise of Legends	Big Huge Games	Microsoft Game Studios	
2006 (10th)	Star Wars: Empire at War	Petroglyph Games	LucasArts	
2006 (10th)	The Lord of the Rings: The Battle for Middle-earth II: The Rise of the Witch-king	EA Los Angeles	Electronic Arts	
2006 (10th)	Simulation Game of the Year			
2006 (10th)	Microsoft Flight Simulator X	Aces Game Studio	Microsoft Game Studios	
2006 (10th)	Sid Meier's Railroads!	Firaxis Games	2K Games	
2006 (10th)	Tourist Trophy	Polyphony Digital	Sony Computer Entertainment	
2007 (11th)	Command & Conquer 3: Tiberium Wars	EA Los Angeles	Electronic Arts	
2007 (11th)	Ace Combat 6: Fires of Liberation	Project Aces	Namco Bandai Games	
2007 (11th)	Company of Heroes: Opposing Fronts	Relic Entertainment	THQ	
2007 (11th)	Supreme Commander	Gas Powered Games	THQ	
2007 (11th)	World in Conflict	Massive Entertainment	Vivendi Games	
2008 (12th)	Command & Conquer: Red Alert 3	EA Los Angeles	Electronic Arts	
2008 (12th)	Advance Wars: Days of Ruin	Intelligent Systems	Nintendo	
2008 (12th)	Civilization Revolution	Firaxis Games	2K Games	
2008 (12th)	Sins of a Solar Empire	Ironclad Games	Stardock	
2008 (12th)	Tom Clancy's EndWar	Ubisoft Shanghai	Ubisoft	
2009 (13th)	Brütal Legend	Double Fine Productions	Electronic Arts	
2009 (13th)	Fire Emblem: Shadow Dragon	Intelligent Systems	Nintendo	
2009 (13th)	Halo Wars	Ensemble Studios	Microsoft Game Studios	
2009 (13th)	The Sims 3	Maxis	Electronic Arts	
2009 (13th)	Warhammer 40,000: Dawn of War II	Relic Entertainment	THQ	

=== 2010s ===
Year	Game	Developer(s)	Publisher(s)	Ref.
2010 (14th)	StarCraft II: Wings of Liberty	Blizzard Entertainment	Blizzard Entertainment	
2010 (14th)	Civilization V	Firaxis Games	2K Games	
2010 (14th)	Supreme Commander 2	Gas Powered Games	Square Enix	
2010 (14th)	Toy Soldiers	Signal Studios	Microsoft Game Studios	
2010 (14th)	Warhammer 40,000: Dawn of War II - Chaos Rising	Relic Entertainment	THQ	
2011 (15th)	Orcs Must Die!	Robot Entertainment	Microsoft Studios	
2011 (15th)	Iron Brigade	Double Fine Productions	Microsoft Studios	
2011 (15th)	Total War: Shogun 2	Creative Assembly	Sega	
2011 (15th)	Toy Soldiers: Cold War	Signal Studios	Microsoft Studios	
2011 (15th)	Warhammer 40,000: Dawn of War II - Retribution	Relic Entertainment	THQ	
2012 (16th)	XCOM: Enemy Unknown	Firaxis Games	2K Games	
2012 (16th)	FTL: Faster Than Light	Subset Games	Subset Games	
2012 (16th)	Minecraft: 360 Edition	Mojang Studios, 4J Studios	Microsoft Studios	
2012 (16th)	Orcs Must Die! 2	Robot Entertainment	Microsoft Studios	
2012 (16th)	Total War: Shogun 2: Fall of the Samurai	Creative Assembly	Sega	
2013 (17th)	XCOM: Enemy Within	Firaxis Games	2K Games	
2013 (17th)	Civilization V: Brave New World	Firaxis Games	2K Games	
2013 (17th)	Europa Universalis IV	Paradox Development Studio	Paradox Interactive	
2013 (17th)	Fire Emblem Awakening	Intelligent Systems	Nintendo	
2013 (17th)	StarCraft II: Heart of the Swarm	Blizzard Entertainment	Blizzard Entertainment	
2014 (18th)	Hearthstone: Heroes of Warcraft	Blizzard Entertainment	Blizzard Entertainment	
2014 (18th)	Boom Beach	Supercell	Supercell	
2014 (18th)	Civilization: Beyond Earth	Firaxis Games	2K Games	
2014 (18th)	Dungeon of the Endless	Amplitude Studios	Amplitude Studios	
2014 (18th)	Endless Legend	Amplitude Studios	Iceberg Interactive	
2015 (19th)	Heroes of the Storm	Blizzard Entertainment	Blizzard Entertainment	
2015 (19th)	Cities: Skylines	Colossal Order	Paradox Interactive	
2015 (19th)	Fallout Shelter	Bethesda Game Studios, Behaviour Interactive	Bethesda Softworks	
2015 (19th)	Grey Goo	Petroglyph Games	Grey Box	
2015 (19th)	Kerbal Space Program	Squad	Squad	
2016 (20th)	Civilization VI	Firaxis Games	2K Games	
2016 (20th)	The Banner Saga 2	Stoic	Versus Evil	
2016 (20th)	Deus Ex Go	Square Enix Montreal	Square Enix Europe	
2016 (20th)	Fire Emblem Fates	Intelligent Systems	Nintendo	
2016 (20th)	XCOM 2	Firaxis Games	2K Games	
2017 (21st)	Mario + Rabbids Kingdom Battle	Ubisoft Milan, Ubisoft Paris	Ubisoft	
2017 (21st)	Endless Space 2	Amplitude Studios	Sega	
2017 (21st)	Halo Wars 2	Creative Assembly	Microsoft Studios	
2017 (21st)	Total War: Warhammer II	Creative Assembly	Sega	
2017 (21st)	XCOM 2: War of the Chosen	Firaxis Games	2K Games	
2018 (22nd)	Into the Breach	Subset Games	Subset Games	
2018 (22nd)	Bad North	Plausible Concept	Raw Fury	
2018 (22nd)	Frostpunk	11 Bit Studios	11 Bit Studios	
2018 (22nd)	Northgard	Shiro Games	Shiro Games	
2018 (22nd)	RimWorld	Ludeon Studios	Ludeon Studios	
2019 (23rd)	Fire Emblem: Three Houses	Intelligent Systems	Nintendo	
2019 (23rd)	Anno 1800	Ubisoft Mainz	Ubisoft	
2019 (23rd)	Oxygen Not Included	Klei Entertainment	Klei Entertainment	
2019 (23rd)	Slay the Spire	MegaCrit	Humble Bundle	
2019 (23rd)	Total War: Three Kingdoms	Creative Assembly	Sega	

=== 2020s ===
Year	Game	Developer(s)	Publisher(s)	Ref.
2020 (24th)	Microsoft Flight Simulator	Asobo Studios	Xbox Game Studios	
2020 (24th)	Crusader Kings III	Paradox Development Studio	Paradox Interactive	
2020 (24th)	Desperados III	Mimimi Games	THQ Nordic	
2020 (24th)	Monster Train	Shiny Shoe	Good Shepherd Entertainment	
2020 (24th)	Per Aspera	Tiön Industries	Raw Fury	
2021 (25th)	Age of Empires IV	Relic Entertainment, World's Edge	Xbox Game Studios	
2021 (25th)	Gloomhaven	Flaming Fowl Studios	Asmodee Digital	
2021 (25th)	Griftlands	Klei Entertainment	Klei Entertainment	
2021 (25th)	Inscryption	Daniel Mullins Games	Devolver Digital	
2021 (25th)	Loop Hero	Four Quarters	Devolver Digital	
2022 (26th)	Dwarf Fortress	Bay 12 Games	Kitfox Games	
2022 (26th)	Ixion	Bulwark Studios	Kasedo Games	
2022 (26th)	Marvel's Midnight Suns	Firaxis Games	2K Games	
2022 (26th)	Potion Craft: Alchemist Simulator	niceplay Games	tinyBuild	
2022 (26th)	Warhammer 40,000: Chaos Gate - Daemonhunters	Complex Games	Frontier Foundry	
2023 (27th)	Dune: Spice Wars	Shiro Games	Funcom, Shiro Games	
2023 (27th)	Against the Storm	Eremite Games	Hooded Horse	
2023 (27th)	Cobalt Core	Rocket Rat Games	Brace Yourself Games	
2023 (27th)	The Last Spell	Ishtar Games	The Arcade Crew	
2023 (27th)	Wartales	Shiro Games	Shiro Games	
2024 (28th)	Balatro	LocalThunk	PlayStack	
2024 (28th)	Caves of Qud	Freehold Games	Kitfox Games	
2024 (28th)	Frostpunk 2	11 Bit Studios	11 Bit Studios	
2024 (28th)	Satisfactory	Coffee Stain Studios	Coffee Stain Studios	
2024 (28th)	Tactical Breach Wizards	Suspicious Developments	Suspicious Developments	
2025 (29th)	The Alters	11 Bit Studios	11 Bit Studios	
2025 (29th)	Drop Duchy	Sleepy Mill Studio	The Arcade Crew	
2025 (29th)	Europa Universalis V	Paradox Tinto	Paradox Interactive	
2025 (29th)	The King Is Watching	Hypnohead	tinyBuild	
2025 (29th)	StarVaders	Pengonauts	Joystick Ventures	

== Multiple nominations and wins ==
=== Developers and publishers ===
Firaxis Games, as a developer, has received the most nominations and has won the most awards; Microsoft and Xbox Game Studios, as a publisher, has received the most nominations and has won the most awards. There are numerous developers with consecutive wins in this category:

- Ensemble Studios: Won Computer Strategy Game of the Year for Age of Empires II: The Age of Kings in 2000, and the expansion pack The Conquerors in 2001.
- Maxis: Won (Computer) Simulation Game of the Year for The Sims expansion packs Unleashed in 2003, Superstar in 2004, and the sequel The Sims 2 in 2005.
- EA Los Angeles: Won in 2008 with Command & Conquer 3: Tiberium Wars, and 2009 with Command & Conquer: Red Alert 3.
- Firaxis Games: Won in 2013 with XCOM: Enemy Unknown, and in 2014 with the expansion pack Enemy Within.
- Blizzard Entertainment: Won in 2015 with Hearthstone, and 2016 with Heroes of the Storm.

When there were separate awards for strategy games and simulation games, both Microsoft and Electronic Arts has published winners for both categories in the same year:

- Microsoft:
  - 1998: Age of Empires for strategy, and Microsoft Flight Simulator 98 for simulation.
  - 2000: Age of Empires II: The Age of Kings for strategy, and Microsoft Flight Simulator 2000 for simulation.
  - 2001: Age of Empires II: The Conquerors for strategy, and MechWarrior 4: Vengeance for simulation.
- Electronic Arts:
  - 1999: Sid Meier's Alpha Centauri for strategy, and Need for Speed III: Hot Pursuit for simulation.
  - 2004: Command & Conquer: Generals for strategy, and The Sims: Superstar for simulation.

Microsoft is the only publisher to have back-to-back wins for both strategy and simulation categories in consecutive years (2000 and 2001). Since the merger of strategy and simulation genres into one category in 2008, four different publishers has garnered consecutive wins:

- Electronic Arts:
  - 2008: Command & Conquer 3: Tiberium Wars
  - 2009: Command & Conquer: Red Alert 3
  - 2010: Brütal Legend
- 2K Games:
  - 2013: XCOM: Enemy Unknown
  - 2014: XCOM: Enemy Within
- Blizzard Entertainment:
  - 2015: Hearthstone: Heroes of Warcraft
  - 2016: Heroes of the Storm
- Xbox Game Studios:
  - 2021: Microsoft Flight Simulator
  - 2022: Age of Empires IV

Sega has published the most nominees without a win.

Developers
Developer	Nominations	Wins
Firaxis Games	15	6
Microsoft Simulation Group/Aces Game Studio	6	4
Blizzard Entertainment	6	4
Ensemble Studios	6	3
Maxis	5	3
Relic Entertainment	9	2
EA Los Angeles	4	2
Creative Assembly	8	1
Intelligent Systems	5	1
Westwood Studios/Westwood Pacific/EA Pacific	4	1
11 Bit Studios	3	1
Shiro Games	3	1
Double Fine Productions	2	1
Lionhead Studios	2	1
Robot Entertainment	2	1
Subset Games	2	1
Amplitude Studios	3	0
FASA Studio	3	0
Digital Image Design	2	0
EA Baltimore	2	0
Gas Powered Games	2	0
Impressions Games	2	0
Klei Entertainment	2	0
Paradox Development Studio	2	0
Petroglyph Games	2	0
Signal Studios	2	0

Publishers
Publisher	Nominations	Wins
Microsoft/Xbox Game Studios	43	11
Electronic Arts	22	9
2K Games	12	4
Blizzard Entertainment	6	4
Activision	4	2
THQ/THQ Nordic	8	1
Ubisoft	8	1
Nintendo	6	1
Infogrames	5	1
11 Bit Studios	3	1
Shiro Games	3	1
Kitfox Games	2	1
Subset Games	2	1
Sega	6	0
Interplay Productions/Entertainment	4	0
Paradox Interactive	4	0
Sierra On-Line/Entertainment	4	0
Devolver Digital	2	0
Empire Interactive	2	0
Hasbro Interactive	2	0
Klei Entertainment	2	0
LucasArts	2	0
Raw Fury	2	0
tinyBuild	2	0
Vivendi (Universal) Games	2	0

=== Franchises ===
All of the Sid Meier games, including the Civilization franchise, have received the most nominations for strategy/simulation games, while the Microsoft Flight Simulator franchise has received the most awards for strategy/simulation games. There have been numerous games with multiple nominations, mostly for expansion packs:

- Age of Empires II: The Age of Kings won Computer Strategy Game of the Year in 2000, and the expansion pack The Conquerors won in 2001.
- MechWarrior 4: Vengeance won Computer Simulation Game of the Year in 2001, and the expansion Mercenaries was nominated in 2003.
- The Sims expansion packs Unleashed and Superstar won Computer Simulation Game of the Year in 2003 and 2004, respectively.
- Rise of Nations was nominated for Computer Strategy Game of the Year in 2004, and the expansion pack Rise of Legends was nominated in 2007.
- Warhammer 40,000: Dawn of War II was nominated in 2010, and the expansion packs Chaos Rising and Retribution were nominated in 2011 and 2012, respectively.
- StarCraft II: Wings of Liberty won in 2011, and the expansion pack Heart of the Swarm was nominated in 2014.
- Civilization V was nominated in 2011, and the expansion pack Brave New World was nominated in 2014.
- Total War: Shogun 2 was nominated in 2012, and the expansion pack Fall of the Samurai was nominated in 2013.
- XCOM: Enemy Unknown won in 2013, and the expansion pack Enemy Within won in 2014.
- XCOM 2 was nominated in 2017, and the expansion pack War of the Chosen was nominated in 2018.

Age of Empires II, XCOM: Enemy Unknown, and The Sims are the only games with back-to-back wins albeit with expansion packs, whereas the Command & Conquer franchise has back-to-back wins (non-expansion) with Command & Conquer 3: Tiberium Wars in 2008, and Command & Conquer: Red Alert 3 in 2009. The Sims franchise has won a third consecutive year for Simulation Game of the Year with The Sims 2 in 2005. Warhammer 40,000: Dawn of War II is the only game that has been nominated three times.

Franchises
Franchise	Nominations	Wins
Microsoft Flight Simulator	6	5
Sid Meier/Civilization	10	4
Age of Empires (Note: includes the spin-off Age of Mythology.)	6	4
Command & Conquer	6	3
The Sims	4	3
XCOM	4	2
StarCraft	3	2
Warcraft	2	2
Total War	7	1
Fire Emblem	4	1
Company of Heroes	2	1
MechWarrior	2	1
Need for Speed	2	1
Orcs Must Die!	2	1
Warhammer 40,000	5	0
Jane's Combat Simulations	4	0
RollerCoaster Tycoon	3	0
Empire Earth (Note: Empires: Dawn of the Modern World is a spin-off of Empire Earth.)	2	0
F-22	2	0
Europa Universalis	2	0
FreeSpace	2	0
Frostpunk	2	0
Halo	2	0
Homeworld	2	0
Middle-earth	2	0
Rise of Nations	2	0
Star Wars	2	0
Supreme Commander	2	0
Toy Soldiers	2	0
