= MiG Alley (video game) =

1999 video game

- Developer: Rowan Software
- Publisher: Empire Interactive
- Platform: Microsoft Windows
- Release: GER: July 1999; EU: October 1, 1999; NA: November 30, 1999
- Genre: Combat flight simulation game
- Mode: Single player

MiG Alley is a combat flight simulation game, developed by Rowan Software for PCs with Windows, and was published by Empire Interactive in 1999.

== Description ==
MiG Alley is a historical simulation which focuses on early jet fighter combat in the Korean War – specifically, the so-called MiG Alley in northwestern North Korea, for which the game is named. One of the interesting aspects of the game is the closeness in overall performance between the main combat fighter aircraft – the MiG-15 and the F-86 Sabre. Another is that the game was one of the earliest in the genre to incorporate a "dynamic" campaign, in which the player's missions are influenced by in-game events rather than being presented in a predetermined order.

== History ==
MiG Alley was developed by Rowan Software and published by Empire Interactive in 1999. In 2001, when Rowan was shut down by Empire Interactive, the developers released the source code to allow the community to continue the game's support on their own. The release happened with permission from Empire Interactive under the "Empire Interactive License", and didn't include the textures and landscape detailing.

== Reception ==
Reception

Aggregate score
Aggregator	Score
GameRankings	86%

Review scores
Publication	Score
AllGame	4.5/5
CNET Gamecenter	9/10
Computer Games Strategy Plus	4/5
Computer Gaming World	4.5/5
EP Daily	9/10
GameSpot	9.2/10
GameSpy	84%
GameZone	8/10
IGN	9/10
Next Generation	4/5
PC Gamer (US)	90%

Awards
Publication	Award
Computer Gaming World	Simulation of the Year
PC Gamer US	Best Simulation
Computer Games Strategy Plus	Simulation of the Year
Academy of Interactive Arts & Sciences	Computer Simulation Game of the Year (finalist)

The game received favorable reviews according to the review aggregation website GameRankings. Christian A. O'Brien of NextGen called it "A fine sim with terrific graphics and a great sense of campaign flow. There's something here for just about everyone." Steve Baxter of GamePro called it "a serious historical simulation; it is also serious fun. Mastering original jet fighter technology is a challenge and learning about one of the hottest battles of the Cold War makes it a simulation worth flying." (Note: GamePro gave the game all 4/5 scores each for graphics, sound, control, and fun factor.) The Electric Playground gave it universal acclaim over a year-and-a-half after its release date.

The game sold 4,171 units in the U.S. during 1999, after its release on November 30 of that year. Jason Ocampo of CNET Gamecenter wrote that it "tanked at retail".

The game was a finalist for the "Computer Simulation Game of the Year" award at the Academy of Interactive Arts & Sciences' 3rd Annual Interactive Achievement Awards, which ultimately went to Microsoft Flight Simulator 2000. However, it was named the best simulation of 1999 by Computer Gaming World, PC Gamer US, CNET Gamecenter, Computer Games Strategy Plus and GameSpot. PC Gamer US highlighted the game's "outstanding flight modeling, butter-smooth graphics, and rich dynamic campaign structure".
