= Age of Empires II: The Conquerors =

2000 expansion pack to the rts video game "Age of Empires II"

- Developer: Ensemble Studios
- Publisher: Microsoft
- Composers: Stephen Rippy; Kevin McMullan
- Series: Age of Empires
- Platform: Windows
- Release: NA: August 25, 2000; EU: September 15, 2000
- Genre: Real-time strategy
- Modes: Single-player, multiplayer

Age of Empires II: The Conquerors is an expansion pack for the 1999 real-time strategy video game Age of Empires II: The Age of Kings. The fourth installment in the Age of Empires series by Microsoft Game Studios and Ensemble Studios, The Conquerors was released in August 2000. It features five new civilizations (the Aztecs, Huns, Koreans, Mayans, and Spanish), four new campaigns, eleven new units, twenty-six new technologies, new gameplay modes, new maps and different minor tweaks to the gameplay.

== Gameplay ==
The Conquerors introduced various new gameplay features and tweaks, including the new game modes Defend the Wonder, King of the Hill, and Wonder Race. Additional maps, some based on real-life geographic locations, and new winter and tropical terrain textures were also included.

In-game, infantry are now able to garrison in battering rams, protecting the infantry while increasing the ram's speed and attack, while ships are now able to use formations for more effective fighting. The graphics are left unchanged, but five new civilizations have been added: the Aztecs, Huns, Koreans, Mayans, and Spanish. In addition to new units, the in-game upgrade lines have been extended to provide more unit choices. The Aztecs and Mayans lack the ability to train cavalry units, which is partially balanced by the fact that they start with Eagle Warrior infantry units, who have many of the advantages that cavalry have. Both civilizations also lack access to gunpowder units. The Huns are also unique in that they do not build houses to support their population, from the start being only limited by the fixed population limit of the game.

Micromanagement is made easier by an improved scripted artificial intelligence of villagers and siege weapons. Villagers will now automatically commence gathering resources if they have completed the construction of a resource-gathering site. Wall construction has also been improved: when assigning two or more villagers, they evenly spread out instead of working on the same segment. Similarly, if multiple farmers are sent to one farm, the surplus will start cultivating adjacent farms instead of idling. Mangonels and onagers will not automatically fire if their attack is likely to harm friendly units. Additionally, a button has been added to the mill, which allows farms to be paid for in advance, so that when an existing one is exhausted, it will automatically be replanted without requiring manual input from the player. Chat commands have been introduced in order to communicate more effectively with allied computer players.

=== Campaigns ===
The Conquerors adds four additional single-player campaigns. These are based on Attila the Hun's rise to power, Montezuma's defense against Hernán Cortés, and the adventures of El Cid. The fourth campaign, "Battles of the Conquerors", is actually a group of unrelated individual scenarios, each based on a significant historical battle. These include the Battle of Tours, the saga of Erik the Red, the Battle of Hastings, the Battle of Manzikert, the Battle of Agincourt, the Battle of Lepanto, the Battle of Yamazaki, and the Battle of Noryang.

A hidden scenario is also available on the game disc: the Saxon Revolt (original German title: Anno 782 - Sachsenaufstand). The historical background of the scenario is the war between the Frankish king Charlemagne and the Saxon duke Widukind. More specifically, the scenario covers the Battle of Süntel and the Massacre of Verden in the year 782. The player controls the Franks against the Saxons and their allies.

Attila the Hun

The Attila the Hun campaign begins as Attila assumes leadership of the Huns through the death of his brother Bleda and leads them to victory over their enemies, the Persians, the Scythians, and the Western Roman Empire. Attila then launches a series of raids on various cities (Naissus, Sofia, Dyrrhachium, Thessalonica, and Adrianople), in order to obtain resources to destroy a base in the Eastern Roman Empire. These raids take him to Marcianopolis, Philippopolis, and Constantinople, continuing even as the Romans attempt to buy him off with payments of gold. He then receives a whimsical marriage proposal from Honoria, prompting him to concentrate his raids in Gaul, defeating Burgundy, Metz, and Orléans before withstanding the onslaught of a Roman army. Aetius then takes the battle to Attila at the Catalaunian Fields, alongside the Visigoths, led by Theodoric, and the Alans. After defeating all three of these enemies, Attila advances into northern Italy as he plunders Aquileia, Verona, Padua, and Milan. He is then summoned to a meeting with Pope Leo I in Rome, and the Pope somehow convinces him not to attack Rome.

El Cid

The El Cid campaign begins as Rodrigo Díaz de Vivar becomes King Sancho's champion through a trial by combat, in which he obtains his horse Bavieca. He then defeats Sancho's brother, King Alfonso of León (who covets Sancho's Kingdom of Castile), and brings him to Sancho so that they may come to an amicable settlement. Sancho is assassinated, with the game implying that Alfonso was involved. Alfonso thereby becomes king of both León and Castile. El Cid has Alfonso swear an oath that he was not responsible for the death of his brother. Toledo then demands El Cid's attention as Spanish and Moorish rebels take over the city; an imam tells El Cid to bring him the four relics scattered throughout the city so that he might quell the rebellion. El Cid also meets Motamid during this quest to restore peace to Toledo. King Alfonso orders El Cid into exile, but once he destroys one of Alfonso's castles blocking his way to Zaragoza, Alfonso declares a truce. He then meets up with Motamid in Zaragoza and takes up service with him, helping him defeat Count Berenguer. He returns to King Alfonso's service to defend him from the attacks of Yusuf and his Black Guard, destroying all of their docks. Alfonso exiles him yet again, and El Cid wanders through the cities of Denia and Lérida until finally arriving in Valencia, which he defends from the attacks of Berenguer as the Valencians construct a Wonder. He rules there until Yusuf puts the city to siege. He is killed by a stray arrow in a failed raid, and his wife Ximena de Asturias puts his corpse on horseback to give the impression that he is still alive, so that his soldiers will not lose heart as they defeat Yusuf's forces.

Montezuma

The Montezuma campaign opens with the Aztecs responding to various prophecies by taking possession of numerous shrines in the jungle, over the opposition of their opponents, the Tlatiluco, the Tepanaca, and the Xochimilco. They then invoke the Triple Alliance of themselves, Texcoco, and Tlacopan in order to defeat the Tlaxcala. Once the Tlaxcala have been defeated, the Texcoco and Tlacopan betray the Aztecs and are promptly defeated themselves. The Spanish then arrive on the shores of the New World in search of gold, and Hernán Cortés destroys his transports to indicate his resolve to make good his claim on the Aztec Empire in the name of the King of Spain. The Aztecs fail to protect Tabasco from the Spanish and come to the conclusion that the Spanish are their enemies as well as the Tlaxcala. They proceed to defeat the Tlaxcala, who have allied with the Spanish, and steal some Spanish horses as well. Montezuma is killed by his own subjects who are fed up with his being out of touch. Cortés builds a Wonder in Tenochtitlán which Cuauhtémoc and a band of raiders eventually destroy, forcing the Spanish out of the city. They then defeat the Tlaxcala and Spanish in the Battle of Otumba (which was actually a Spanish victory in real life) and capture some horses and gunpowder carts to be able to train cavalry and cannons. They finally defeat the Spanish Army, Spanish Navy, and Tlaxcala from their reclaimed city of Tenochtitlán.

Battles of the Conquerors

The Battle of Tours in 732 shows Charles Martel capturing the Moors' baggage train after the latter had already overrun Poitiers. Vindlandsaga shows Erik the Red's expedition to Newfoundland, showcasing raids on the British coastline, the subjugation of Greenland, and the fending off of Skræling in the New World as the Vikings found a settlement. The Battle of Hastings shows William the Conqueror launching his invasion of England in 1066 to defeat Harold the Saxon, as well as Harald Hardraade's defeat at the Battle of Stamford Bridge. The Battle of Manzikert in 1071 shows the Seljuk Turks defeating the Byzantine Emperor Romanos IV and conquering eastern Anatolia by extracting resources from the themes of Cappadocia, Pisidia, and Galatia, before defeating the Byzantine Army proper. The Battle of Agincourt in 1415 shows Henry V asserting his claim to the throne of France as he retreats from Harfleur and then travels through Voyeni, Amiens, and Frévent before facing the French knights with his longbowmen and sailing back to England. The Battle of Lepanto in 1571 shows John of Austria's forces keeping Turkish ships and transports at bay as they defend a Wonder constructed quite close to the shoreline. The Battle of Kyoto (Yamazaki) in 1582 shows the death of Oda Nobunaga and Toyotomi Hideyoshi's taking of Osaka and Hyogo and the destruction of all the castles in Kyoto. The Battle of Noryang Point in 1598 shows Admiral Yi Sun-Shin's invention of the turtle ship as his last stand against the Japanese forces of Toyotomi Hideyoshi sees the Japanese defeated in their desire to expand into Korea.

== Development and release ==
The Conquerors was created by Ensemble Studios, who had developed Age of Empires II: The Age of Kings in 1999, its predecessor in 1997 and Rise of Rome expansion pack in 1998. The concept of the expansion pack was thematically inspired by the historical notion of conquerors and colonisation of the New World. To support this concept, designer Greg Street stated the studio developed a list of "famous conquerors", narrowing their focus to those that would "show off the new civilizations" and that "players would most want to portray". In the additional campaign, the developers researched "famous battles", such as the Battles of Agincourt, Lepanto, and Manzikert, that were "important in history, but not robust enough to support an entire campaign. Designer Bruce Shelley stated that the approach taken to the expansion was to "improve the fun and appeal" for both hardcore and casual gamers, using player feedback on the original game to help guide the design of gameplay changes and additions. Ensemble Studios technical director David Pottinger stated that the game's artificial intelligence engine was improved for the expansion, using a method named "behaviour combination" to create more complicated behaviours from enemy units.

A game demo was released, previewing the Mayan and Aztec civilizations over the first Aztec single-player campaign mission and one multiplayer map. The Conquerors received a gold master in early August 2000, and was released on 25 August.

Following release, Ensemble Studios published several downloadable patches and maps for The Conquerors. In 2001, Microsoft released Age of Empires: Collector's Edition, containing both Age of Empires titles with their respective expansions.

=== Soundtrack ===
The game disc itself is a mixed-mode CD (containing both data and audio tracks). Track 1 appears as the data track, and track 2 is the soundtrack as a Red Book audio track. According to Gracenote, it is called "Subotai Defeats The Knights Templar". As in the PC version, the file is very long and uses small transitions to separate tracks. It lasts for 30 minutes and 48 seconds. The Age of Empires Collector Edition Soundtrack CD's tracklist gives many of the names of the individual tracks. The tracks were composed by Stephen Rippy and Kevin McMullan.

These are the tracks that appear on the audio part of the game CD, in order of playback. The tracks are not separated, but instead are one long track with floating transitions. Some of the tracks are featured on the "More Music From The Ages" CD, though these are usually only available as prizes from Ensemble Studios.

== Reception ==
Reception

Aggregate score
Aggregator	Score
Metacritic	88/100

Review scores
Publication	Score
Computer Games Magazine	5/5
Computer Gaming World	4/5
IGN	8.2/10
PC Gamer (US)	93%
PC PowerPlay	90%
PC Zone	79%/ 75%

=== Sales ===
In the United States, The Conquerors had sold 221,000 units and earned $6 million by October 2000, according to PC Data. It had sold 800,000 copies and earned $20.1 million in the region by August 2006, and was the country's 12th best-selling computer game between January 2000 and August 2006. Combined sales of all Age of Empires games released between January 2000 and August 2006, including The Conquerors, had reached 4.1 million units in the United States by the latter date. The Conquerors received a "Silver" sales award from the Entertainment and Leisure Software Publishers Association (ELSPA), indicating sales of at least 100,000 copies in the United Kingdom.

=== Reviews ===
The Conquerors received "generally favorable" reviews, according to review aggregator Metacritic. However, not all critics agreed the expansion was a significant addition to the game, with Computer Gaming World expressing it was "not the massive improvement over its predecessor" as was the case with Age of Empires: The Rise of Rome.

=== Accolades ===
During the 4th Annual Interactive Achievement Awards, the Academy of Interactive Arts & Sciences honored The Conquerors with the "PC Strategy" award; it also received nominations for "PC Game of the Year" and "Game of the Year". Computer Gaming World expressed surprise at the nomination, questioning whether an expansion should be eligible. The Wargamer named it as the best real-time strategy game of 2000 and overall best strategy game of 2000 (tie with Space Empires IV).

=== Retrospective ===
Several critics retrospectively stated that The Conquerors was an exemplary model of an expansion pack. Cindy Yans of Computer Games Magazine stated the expansion was one of her favorite, stating it brought "vast improvements in gameplay and balance", making the original game better. PC Gamer US named The Conquerors the best expansion pack of 2000.
