= Age of Empires II =

1999 real-time strategy video game

Age of Empires II: The Age of Kings
- PC box cover
- Developer: Ensemble Studios
- Publishers: Microsoft; Konami (PS2)
- Designer: Bruce Shelley
- Programmer: Angelo Laudon
- Artists: Brad Crow; Scott Winsett
- Composer: Stephen Rippy
- Series: Age of Empires
- Engine: Genie Engine
- Platforms: Microsoft Windows; Mac OS; PlayStation 2
- Release: September 27, 1999: Microsoft Windows; NA: September 27, 1999; UK/AU: October 29, 1999 HD Edition; WW: April 9, 2013 Mac OS (Gold); WW: October 31, 2001 PlayStation 2; UK: November 2, 2001; AU: November 9, 2001; JP: February 14, 2002 J2ME; WW: June 1, 2005
- Genre: Real-time strategy
- Modes: Single-player, multiplayer

Age of Empires II: The Age of Kings is a real-time strategy video game developed by Ensemble Studios and published by Microsoft. Released in 1999 for Microsoft Windows and Macintosh in 2001, it is the second game in the Age of Empires series. The Age of Kings is set in the Middle Ages and contains 13 playable civilizations. Players aim to gather resources, which they use to build towns, create armies, and defeat their enemies. There are 5 historically based campaigns, which conscript the player to specialized and story-backed conditions, and 3 additional single-player game modes; multiplayer is also supported.

Despite using the same game engine and code similar to its predecessor's, development of The Age of Kings took a year longer than expected, forcing Ensemble Studios to release Age of Empires: The Rise of Rome in 1998 instead. The design team focused on resolving significant issues in Age of Empires, but noted on release that some problems remained.

Reception of Age of Empires II was highly positive. The significant number of new features was praised, as were the gameplay improvements. Three months after its release, two million copies of Age of Empires II had been shipped, and it topped sales charts in seven countries. The game won multiple awards and is today considered a classic of its type, having had a significant impact on future games in its genre. The original Age of Empires II and its 2000 expansion pack, The Conquerors, were later released as The Gold Edition. Age of Empires II is often considered one of the greatest games ever made.

An updated high-definition graphics version of the game, Age of Empires II: HD Edition, was released in 2013. The HD Edition includes the original game and the expansion The Conquerors, as well as new campaigns, civilizations, and updated graphics for high-resolution displays. A remaster, Age of Empires II: Definitive Edition, was released in November 2019.

== Gameplay ==
Age of Empires II is a real-time strategy game that focuses on building towns, gathering resources, and creating armies to defeat opponents. Players conquer rival towns and empires as they advance one of 13 civilizations through four "Ages": the Dark Age, the Feudal Age, the Castle Age (representing the High Middle Ages), and the Imperial Age (reminiscent of the Renaissance)—a 1,000-year timeframe. Advancing to a new Age unlocks new units, structures, and technologies, but players must first build certain buildings from their current age and then pay a sum of resources.

Civilian units, called "villagers", are used to gather resources; they are either male or female—sex does not affect their abilities. Resources can be used to train units, construct buildings, and research technologies, among other things; for example, players can research better armor for infantry units. The game features four types of resources: food, wood, gold, and stone. Food is obtained by hunting animals, gathering berries, harvesting livestock, farming, and fishing, both from shore and from boats. Wood is gathered by chopping down trees. Gold is obtained from either gold mines, trade, or collecting relics in a monastery. Stone is collected from stone mines. Villagers require checkpoints, typically depository buildings (town center, mining camp, mill, and lumber yard), in order to store gathered resources.

Each civilization can purchase upgrades that increase the rate of gathering these resources. Players can also construct a marketplace for trade, where they can trade wood, stone, and food for gold, and use gold to buy other resources. Market prices fluctuate with every transaction. Furthermore, markets and docks can also generate gold by using trading carts or cogs, which are sent to visit foreign markets and ports; once they return to the player's market/dock, gold is added to the stockpile. The amount of gold a trade unit earns on each trip is based on the distance it needed to travel to a foreign market; more gold is earned on longer trips. It is possible to trade with enemies' markets or docks, but the player's trading units may be attacked or destroyed by enemy units in the process. Players do not need to keep trading manually, because once they select the port or market the trading units continue to trade automatically and indefinitely.

There are 5 campaigns in The Age of Kings, containing historically based scenarios such as Genghis Khan's invasion of Eurasia, Barbarossa's crusade, and Saladin's defense of the Holy Land. In the Joan of Arc and William Wallace campaigns, the player can control a unit based on its namesake; in others, players take orders from guiding spirits representative of the army's commander.

Additional game modes are available to the player in The Age of Kings. One mode, random map, generates a map from one of several randomly chosen map-generating scripts, with players starting in the Dark Age with a Town Center, three villagers (or more depending on the civilization), and a scout unit. The game can be won through military conquest, by constructing a special building known as a Wonder and keeping it standing for a certain amount of time, or by obtaining control of all relics on the map for a set amount of time. Deathmatch mode allows players to begin with large amounts of resources, creating a focus on military dominance, while in the regicide mode each player is given a king unit, winning by killing all of the other monarchs.

=== Units and civilizations ===
The Celtic civilization in the Feudal Age. The Town Center is visible and has several farms surrounding it; villagers of both sexes work there and elsewhere to gather resources. A scout on horseback is also at the ready. Military buildings such as the barracks, archery range, and stable are visible, as well as economic buildings—the market, blacksmith and mill. The right bottom corner of the screenshot shows the player's walls and a gate.

Every player has an ultimate limit to the number of units they can create—a population limit—but cannot immediately use this entire potential population. The population capacity, which can be capped at anywhere between 25 and 200 in intervals of 25, is based on the number of houses, Castles, or Town Centers—the main building in a player's town—which have been built. The Age of Kings introduced two significant new features for unit management: the idle villager button, which helps players identify villagers that have not been assigned a task, and the town bell, which sends all of the player's villagers into their Town Center, Castle, or tower for safety; units garrisoned within these 3 buildings, especially archers, increase the building's firepower (towers fire more arrows with units garrisoned inside), including the Town Center, which cannot fire anything at all without someone garrisoned there.

The Age of Kings also includes five types of military units: infantry, archers, cavalry, siege weapons, and naval units. Certain types of infantry, archers, and cavalry are "counter units" with special defenses against other types of units. The three human classes of military generally follow a rock-paper-scissors model. For example, infantry are generally powerful against buildings but weak against cavalry, thus the infantry counter units—spearmen and pikemen—have attack bonuses against cavalry.

Each civilization in The Age of Kings has one or two special units that are exclusive to that civilization. These civilization-specific units are generally more powerful, but still follow the basic rock-paper-scissors model. The monk is a special kind of military unit that has the ability to convert enemy units to the player's civilization, and to heal allied units. Monks are also used to collect relics, which accumulate gold once held in the player's monastery—the more relics are captured, the faster the gold is accumulated. Collecting all relics on the map is one method by which a player can win a random map game, depending on the victory condition. Once a player has all the relics in their monasteries, a timer is shown to all players. The player holding all of the relics wins if they maintain control of the relics for the length of the timer.

Players choose to play as one of 13 civilizations split into 4 architectural styles—Western European (Britons, Celts, and Franks), Central European (Goths, Teutons, and Vikings), Middle Eastern (Byzantines, Persians, Saracens, and Turks), and East Asian (Chinese, Japanese, and Mongols) —that determine building appearance in-game. The civilizations have varying strengths and weaknesses with regards to economics, technology, and combat, and each has access to one or more different, very powerful "Unique Units". Additionally, each civilization provides an individual team bonus in team games. To add variety, each civilization has a set of sound bites in its native language that are uttered by units when selected or instructed to perform a task.

=== Buildings ===
Buildings in The Age of Kings are split into economic and military categories. Buildings can research technologies and upgrades that increase economic, military, or unit-based efficiency, as well as provide resources for the player.

The most important economic building is the Town Center, where villagers are created, all types of resources can be stored, some technologies are researched, and the player can advance to the next Age. The Town Center can fire arrows at enemy units if villagers or archers are garrisoned inside while enemy units are within range. Other economic buildings include storage buildings for resources, farms, docks (the dock may also produce several military ships), and houses to support a higher population.

Military buildings include unit-producing buildings such as barracks, archery ranges, stables, and castles, as well as defensive buildings such as walls and towers. Military buildings can conduct research to improve the abilities of military units, increasing their strength, defensive capabilities, or other capabilities. Castles are a key offensive and defensive building as they can build trebuchets, train the civilization's "unique unit/s", and fire a hail of arrows at enemy units within range, with garrisoned units firing extra arrows. Castles can only be built after a player has reached the Castle Age, although in some game options, players begin with an already-built castle as early as the Dark Age.

After advancing to the Imperial Age, players can also construct a Wonder, an expensive non-military building. On many gameplay modes building a Wonder triggers a victory countdown; unless it is destroyed within a certain timeframe, the player who built it wins. Every civilization's Wonder is in the shape of a real-world landmark unique to that historical culture.

=== Single player campaigns ===
The Age of Kings shipped with five campaigns, each having multiple playable scenarios that progress a story line, and each centered around a different civilization. The campaign of William Wallace (Celts) serves as a tutorial campaign, and teaches the player how to move units, gather resources, and build armies to defeat the enemy. It takes place during the Wars of Scottish Independence against the English under King Edward I Longshanks. In the Frankish campaign, the player leads Joan of Arc against the English in the Hundred Years' War. The Saracen campaign features Saladin and his efforts to repulse Crusaders in the Middle East, while the Mongol campaign documents Genghis Khan's conquest of Eurasia; finally, the Teuton campaign focuses on Frederick Barbarossa's ambitious expansion of the Holy Roman Empire. The campaigns are sorted numerically to distinguish difficulty, with the William Wallace campaign being the easiest and Barbarossa and Saladin being the two most challenging.

=== Multiplayer ===
The Age of Kings supports multiplayer over the Internet, or via a local area network (LAN). Up to eight players can take part in one game, with all of the single-player game modes available. The MSN Gaming Zone supported the game until the service closed on June 19, 2006. After that, various multiplayer gaming services such as GameRanger supported it. Since April 2013, Steam supports in-game multiplayer for HD resolution.

== Development ==
Prior to the completion of Age of Empires, Ensemble Studios had signed a contract with Microsoft for a sequel. The design team chose to set The Age of Kings in the Middle Ages as a logical progression from the ancient era setting of Age of Empires. The design team was conscious of attempting to capture the broad appeal of the first game without making the game's design too similar. Nonetheless, they attempted to appeal to the vast demographic who played Age of Empires. The Age of Kings's design team intended to complete the game within a year by using code from the original and reusing the Genie game engine. Several months into the process they found they would not be able to complete a game of the quality they sought in that time. Ensemble Studios informed Microsoft they would need another year and instead created Age of Empires: The Rise of Rome, an easily developed expansion pack of Age of Empires, as a compromise which could be released for Christmas 1998. To help meet the next year's deadline, additional programmers, artists, and designers were employed. To overcome another significant objection to the original game—its path-finding—the team completely redesigned the game engine's movement system. The game took two years to complete with 50 full-time employees on a budget of less than $10 million.

The original Age of Empires was criticized for its artificial intelligence (AI), which did not "cheat" by attributing itself extra resources or using other techniques the human player could not, making it easier to defeat than in many other real-time strategy games. For The Age of Kings, Ensemble Studios attempted to develop a more powerful AI system that still did not compromise by cheating. Industry veteran Mario Grimani led Ensemble Studios in the creation of the new system. The Age of Kings saw the introduction of a triggers system for its scenario editor. The triggers allow messages to be displayed, or actions to take place, based on pre-set criteria or "events". The scenario editor was also improved by the new AI system. The AI and trigger systems interacted regularly in the single-player campaigns.

The team was less successful in resolving other issues; programmer Matt Pritchard complained following the release of Age of Empires that there was still no process by which patches could be issued. Extensive cheating in multiplayer games of Age of Empires came as a result of several bugs in the game, which resulted in Microsoft promising Ensemble Studios there would be a patch process for The Age of Kings. Upon release, there were several bugs that needed immediate attention, but the patch process was not yet ready. The first patch was released 11 months later.

Pritchard also described problems with Microsoft's DirectPlay API following the release of The Age of Kings. He explained, "One of its biggest problems is documentation and testing of the lesser-used portions of the API... Late in the development of AoK, our communications programmer, Paul Bettner, was able to communicate with the DirectPlay developers and an interesting scenario played out several times: Paul would attempt to solve some problem and the developers would indicate that it wouldn't work because of bugs in DirectPlay that they knew about but that were not documented."

Ensemble Studios developed a new terrain system for The Age of Kings, with 3D presentation capabilities that were vastly superior to those of Age of Empires. Pritchard noted an improvement in the team's artistic abilities following their work on the past two games, and he is noted as saying that "AoK became a showcase for their improved talent". However, he complained about the lack of an art asset management tool, while other departments gained new tools and automated procedures to assist in design and play testing.

=== Audio ===
The soundtrack for The Age of Kings was directed by Stephen Rippy, who has since taken that role for all games in the Age of Empires series. Music for the game was split into two categories. For "in-game" music, Rippy's team took musical elements from a variety of cultures and combined them to create a mixed sound. "Pre-game" music was designed to be unique to the civilization in question. Campaigns based on historical figures would include "a theme that will at least be rooted in [the character's] culture".

== Release ==
A demo of The Age of Kings was released on October 16, 1999. It featured the learning campaign, a sample of a random map game, and the ability to play via the MSN Gaming Zone. Much to Ensemble Studios' disappointment, numerous incomplete versions of the game were leaked. These were picked up by warez sites, and sold illegally throughout the Pacific Rim; warez versions of the game were even sold outside Microsoft's offices in South Korea.

== Reception ==
=== Sales ===
In January 2000, three months after its release, Microsoft had shipped two million copies of The Age of Kings. The game topped sales charts in the United States, Japan, the United Kingdom, Germany, France, Australia, and South Korea. It spent the next two and a half years on top 20 sales lists. The Age of Kings was the top-selling game in October 1999, and the fourth highest-selling game in 1999. The game's sales in the United States alone totaled 469,376 by the end of 1999, which drew revenues of $20.2 million, the second-highest domestic gross that year behind SimCity 3000. Domestic sales rose another 442,318 units ($19.56 million) from January through October 2000, according to PC Data. It finished the year as the seventh-largest computer game hit in the United States, with 595,016 in sales and $26.2 million in revenue. Age of Empires II's domestic success continued in 2001: with sales of 478,557 units ($19.4 million), it claimed tenth place for the year.

In the German market, Age of Empires II debuted in first place on Media Control's sales charts during October 1999, and by March 2000 had spent 17 weeks in the rankings. It received the Verband der Unterhaltungssoftware Deutschland's (VUD) "Platinum" award within one month of release, indicating sales of 200,000 units across Germany, Switzerland, and Austria. By the end of February 2000, it had reached "Double-Platinum" status (400,000 sales) and become the German market's "most successful PC game of the past 12 months", according to the VUD. The game later received a "Platinum" sales award from the Entertainment and Leisure Software Publishers Association (ELSPA) for at least 300,000 copies sold in the United Kingdom.

Between the 2019 re-release and global lockdowns due to the COVID-19 pandemic in 2020, the game has seen a resurgence in popularity.

=== Critical reviews ===
Reception

Aggregate score
Aggregator	Score
Metacritic	92/100

Review scores
Publication	Score
AllGame	4.5/5
Computer and Video Games	9.0/10
Edge	8/10
Eurogamer	9/10
GamePro	5/5
GameRevolution	A−
GameSpot	9.1/10
GameSpy	89/100
IGN	8.8/10
PC Zone	9.0/10

The Age of Kings received a 92% positive rating according to video game review aggregator platform Metacritic, based on 21 critics' reviews.

According to Eurogamer's Geoff Richards, "the list of new features and improvements over the original game is over a page long". GamePro's review similarly focused on "new additions to the genre itself" which it argued made The Age of Kings outstanding. These included the idle unit button and town bell. GameSpy's Carlos Salgado was appreciative of other features; he praised the ability to create individual profiles for different players and to customize hotkeys. Meanwhile, IGN appreciated the new abilities given to the villager unit—the review stated villagers "now play an important role not only in the collection of resources, but also in town defense and even in combat."

AllGame's Michael L. House enjoyed the use of sound bites in civilizations' native languages, which he said was "very influential in developing an era-enhancing atmosphere". Eurogamer said this feature "gives [villagers] a personality, rather than the standard 'Acknowledged' grunt of military RTS games", also stating that the use of female villagers provided a good variety. Game Revolution's review explained that by being set in a more recent epoch of human history, The Age of Kings was able to "add character to an otherwise impersonal style of gameplay". Computer and Video Games approved of The Age of Kings' use of shorter, more focused campaigns, compared to its predecessor, while Game Revolution noted that even in slower sections of the campaign, the historical narrative helped maintain player interest. GameSpot said that with the screen full of units, "you can begin to imagine how their historical equivalents once prospered", while GameSpy said The Age of Kings presents "realism rarely seen in the RTS genre". IGN staff argued that while the strengths and weaknesses attributed to different civilizations made the game more realistic, the fact that they were still mostly the same prevented The Age of Kings from "delivering the same battlefield impact of StarCraft or Tiberian Sun".

House also praised the gameplay interface, which he said "couldn't be simpler", as well as the advanced unit grouping and path-finding systems. Nash Werner of GamePro said that the battlefield formation tools were wonderful, and complained only that they could not be assigned to naval units. Computer and Video Games generally agreed, stating that "the controls are very user-friendly and well explained". GameSpot's Greg Kasavin wrote that despite the game's improved graphics, "there's nothing foreign about its appearance" and that most game features will be "immediately recognizable if you've played a real-time strategy game before". PC Zone agreed, but in a negative sense—it argued that The Age of Kings "is essentially an update of a two-year-old game".

Richards was surprised by the quality of The Age of Kings' graphics, considering they were all bitmapped. However, AllGame complained that units were sometimes difficult to tell apart, a point numerous reviewers agreed on. It also considered the sound of The Age of Kings a negative, but not something significant enough to draw players away from the game's overall quality. IGN stated that cutscenes were somewhat bland, but that overall the graphics added "an amazing amount of detail to the actual game". IGN's main criticism was directed at the in-game speech used in campaigns; it rhetorically asked "why can't they just find a Frenchman to do a French accent?" Alex Constantides of Computer and Video Games rated the graphics highly, saying that some in-game buildings are "so grand you'll even feel guilty about burning them to the ground". Werner agreed: "the most noticeable graphical advancements", he wrote, were "the sheer size and scale of things". Game Revolution stated "AOE2 is the best looking of the 2D RTS games out there right now".

The Age of Kings won GameSpot's Strategy Game of the Year in 1999, and was a nominee for Game of the Year. GamePower also named it Strategy Game of the Year, while PC Gamer and Computer Gaming World gave it Editor's Choice awards. The editors of PC Gamer US named it their 1999 "Best Real-Time Strategy Game", and wrote that it "takes everything we know about the real-time strategy genre and polishes it, and polishes it, and then polishes it some more." The Age of Kings won "Computer Strategy Game of the Year", "Computer Game of the Year", and tied for "Outstanding Achievement in Character or Story Development" (with Thief: The Dark Project) during the AIAS' 3rd Annual Interactive Achievement Awards; it also received nominations for "Game of the Year", "Outstanding Achievement in Animation", "Outstanding Achievement in Game Design", and "Outstanding Achievement in Game Play Engineering". IGN ranked The Age of Kings the 53rd best game of all time in 2005, and the 10th best PC game of all time in 2007. GameFAQs users placed it 56th in a poll of the best games ever. A 2023 poll conducted by GQ which surveyed a team of video game journalists across the industry listed Age of Empires II the 98th best video game of all time.

The Age of Kings was highly influential on its genre. Star Wars: Galactic Battlegrounds, a 2001 game by LucasArts, shared The Age of Kings' game engine, and was heavily influenced by its mechanics. Empire Earth's design was also similar to that of The Age of Kings; GameSpot said it "borrows most of that game's controls, interface features, and even some of its keyboard shortcuts". Rick Goodman, designer of Age of Empires and The Rise of Rome, designed Empire Earth. GameSpot's Scott Osborne argued that the gameplay of Cossacks: European Wars was heavily based on The Age of Kings.

== Expansions and sequels ==
Release timeline Age of Empires II release history
1999	Age of Kings
2000	The Conquerors
2001
2002
2003
2004
2005
2006
2007
2008
2009
2010
2011
2012
2013	Age of Empires II HD
2013	The Forgotten
2014
2015	The African Kingdoms
2016	Rise of the Rajas
2017
2018
2019	Age of Empires II: Definitive Edition
2019	The Last Khans
2020
2021	Lords of the West
2021	Dawn of the Dukes
2022	Dynasties of India
2023	Return of Rome
2023	The Mountain Royals
2024	Victors and Vanquished
2024	Chronicles: Battle for Greece
2025	The Three Kingdoms
2025	Chronicles: Alexander the Great
2026	The Last Chieftains
2026	The Viking Sagas

A PlayStation 2 port was released by Konami in 2001 for Europe and in 2002 for Japan. A Nintendo DS spinoff, Age of Empires: The Age of Kings was released in 2006.

An expansion for The Age of Kings, The Conquerors, was released in 2000. It introduced numerous new game features, including unique technologies for each civilization, and five new civilizations. Two of these, the Aztecs and the Mayans, represent the New World and have a distinctive architectural style. Other new civilizations are the Huns, Koreans, and Spanish.

In 2005, a mobile version of Age of Empires II was released for Java mobile devices (J2ME), called Age of Empires II Mobile and developed by In-Fusio. It featured much simplified gameplay and graphics, designed for the mobile devices of the time.

The success of Age of Empires II also spurred the continuation of the franchise: the third historical game in the series, Age of Empires III, was released in 2005. The game portrayed the European colonization of the Americas. Aside from one significant feature, the home city, the game's design was largely similar to that of its predecessor.

The multiplayer-only Age of Empires Online was released in 2012. While the game was freely accessible, it featured premium content which could either be earned through gameplay or purchased, enabling the player to use higher-tier equipment and new game modes. Active development of the game ended on January 1, 2014, when executive producer Kevin Perry stated that adding new content was "no longer cost effective," and announced that the game would be moving from "development phase" to its "support phase". The game servers were subsequently shut down on July 1, 2014.

=== HD Edition ===
In 2012, Hidden Path Entertainment began working on a high-definition remake of Age of Empires II, an effort spearheaded by Matt Pritchard, an original lead programmer at Ensemble Studios. On March 7, 2013, its release was announced, branded as Age of Empires II: HD Edition. It has improved graphics, widescreen support and new multiplayer options through Steam. It was released on April 9, 2013, and there was a pre-order available on April 5. HD Edition received mixed reviews, with aggregate review website Metacritic assigning a score of 68 out of 100 based on reviews from 20 critics. Critics agreed that the HD Edition changed very little from the original game, though Steam Workshop integration was widely praised.

==== The Forgotten ====
Three official expansion packs were released for HD Edition. The first, The Forgotten, is based on a fan-made expansion, The Forgotten Empires. The pack introduces five new civilizations: the Incas, Indians, Italians, Magyars, and Slavs. It includes new maps, campaigns (Alaric I, Bari, Dracula, El Dorado, Francesco I Sforza, and Prithviraj), units, a new game mode, an increase of the maximum population limit from 200 to 500, and numerous balance and gameplay adjustments. The expansion pack was developed by the team that created the mod with the assistance of SkyBox Labs.

==== The African Kingdoms ====
A second expansion pack for Age of Empires II HD, The African Kingdoms, was released on November 5, 2015, and introduces four new civilizations: the Berbers, Ethiopians, Malians, and the Portuguese. It includes new maps, campaigns (Tariq ibn Ziyad, Yodit, Sundjata, and Francisco de Almeida), as well as new units, new game modes including Capture the Relic and Treaty, and numerous balance and gameplay adjustments.

==== Rise of the Rajas ====
The third expansion pack, Rise of the Rajas, was released on December 19, 2016. It is set in Southeast Asia, and adds four civilizations (Burmese, Khmer, Malay, and Vietnamese), each with its own fully voice-acted campaign (Bayinnaung, Suryavarman I, Gajah Mada, and Lê Lợi, respectively), as well as a new map type with environments, units such as the ballista elephant, improved AI, and more.

=== Definitive Edition ===
On August 21, 2017, at Gamescom, Microsoft announced a remaster titled Age of Empires II: Definitive Edition was in development by Forgotten Empires, Tantalus Media, and Wicked Witch Software. On June 9, 2019, Microsoft revealed the gameplay trailer at Xbox E3 2019. The game includes all content from the previous editions and expansions, as well as new 4K graphics. It was released via Xbox Game Pass for PC, the Microsoft Store, and Steam on November 14, 2019. The Definitive Edition has received multiple expansions to the base game, a reworking of the first Age of Empires in the new engine as Return of Rome, as well as Chronicles expansions which are set separately from the medieval timeline focusing on Greece and Persia in classical antiquity and the conquests of Alexander the Great.

In July 2026, Microsoft patched a security vulnerability in the Definitive Edition that could allow an attacker to put malicious files on another player's computer.

== See also ==
- List of game engine recreations
