= Microsoft Flight Simulator 2000 =

1999 video game

- Developer: Microsoft
- Publisher: Microsoft
- Series: Microsoft Flight Simulator
- Platform: Windows
- Release: NA: October 13, 1999; UK: November 12, 1999
- Genre: Flight simulation
- Mode: Single-player

Microsoft Flight Simulator 2000, abbreviated commonly as FS2000, is a flight simulation video game released in late 1999 for Microsoft Windows. A Professional Edition was released alongside the standard edition. It added two airplanes, six cities, and a flight model/instrument panel editor.

== Gameplay ==
Flight Simulator 2000 (version 7.0), abbreviated as FS2000, was released as a major improvement over the previous versions, and was also offered in two versions: One version for "normal" users, and one "pro" version with additional aircraft. Although many users had high expectations when this version arrived, many were disappointed when they found out that the simulator demanded high-end hardware; the minimum requirements were only a Pentium 166 MHz computer, although 400–500 MHz computer was deemed necessary to have an even framerate. However, even on a high-end system, stuttering framerate was a problem, especially when performing sharp turns in graphically dense areas. Also, the visual damage effects introduced in FS5 were disabled, and continued to be unavailable in versions after FS2000. While the visual damage effects were still in the game, Microsoft disabled them through the game's configuration files. Users can re-enable the damage effects through modifications. FS2000 also introduced computer controlled aircraft in some airports.

This version also introduced 3D elevation, making it possible to adjust the elevation for the scenery grids, thus making most of the previous scenery obsolete (as it didn't support this feature). A GPS was also added, enabling an even more realistic operation of the simulator. FS2000 also upgraded its dynamic scenery, with more detailed models and AI that allowed aircraft to yield to other aircraft to avoid incursions while taxiing.

FS2000 included an improved weather system, which featured precipitation for the first time in the form of either snow or rain, as well as other new features such as the ability to download real-world weather.

New aircraft in FS2000 included the supersonic Aerospatiale-BAC Concorde (prominently featured on both editions' box covers) and the Boeing 777 which had recently entered service at the time.

An often overlooked, but highly significant milestone in Flight Simulator 2000, was the addition of over 17,000 new airports, for a total exceeding 20,000 worldwide, as well as worldwide navigational aid coverage. This greatly expanded the utility of the product in simulating long international flights as well as instrument-based flight relying on radio navigation aids. Some of these airports, along with additional objects such as radio towers and other "hazard" structures, were built from publicly available U.S. government databases. Others, particularly the larger commercial airports with detailed apron and taxiway structures, were built from detailed information in Jeppesen's proprietary database, one of the primary commercial suppliers of worldwide aviation navigation data.

In combination, these new data sources in Flight Simulator allowed the franchise to claim the inclusion of virtually every documented airport and navigational aid in the world, as well as allowing implementation of the new GPS feature. As was the case with FS98, scenery development using these new data sources in FS2000 was outsourced to MicroScene in San Ramon, working with the core development team at Microsoft.

Microsoft Flight Simulator 2000 was the last of the Flight Simulator series to support the Windows 95 and Windows NT 4.0 operating systems.

== Reception ==
Reception

Review scores
Publication	Score
Computer Gaming World	4/5
Eurogamer	7/10
GameSpot	8.7/10
Jeuxvideo.com	18/20
GameStar	80%
Gamezilla	81/100
PC Joker	80%

John Nolan for Computer Gaming World said "FS2K doesn't have a simple, intuitive interface; it's more like a cumbersome challenge. The reward for persistence is depth."

Bruce Geryk for GameSpot said: "The greatest strength of Flight Simulator 2000 is undoubtedly the graphics. [...] Although the graphics in Flight Simulator 2000 might be heaven for the flight sim enthusiast, getting them to look good has a very steep hardware requirement."

At the 3rd Annual Interactive Achievement Awards, Microsoft Flight Simulator 2000 won "Computer Simulation Game of the Year" from the Academy of Interactive Arts & Sciences.
