= Age of Mythology: The Titans =

- Developer: Ensemble Studios
- Publisher: Microsoft Game Studios
- Platform: Microsoft Windows
- Release: NA: 30 September 2003; AU: 21 October 2003; EU: 29 October 2003
- Genre: Real-time strategy
- Modes: Single-player, multiplayer

Age of Mythology: The Titans is an expansion pack to the real-time strategy video game of Age of Mythology. It was developed by Ensemble Studios and released on 30 September 2003. It was followed in 2016 by a second expansion pack to the original game called Tale of the Dragon.

The Titans adds a fourth culture to the game, the Atlanteans, and three new major gods, plus new units, buildings and god powers. It also includes many new features, such as auto-queueing (allows indefinite training of units as long as you have sufficient resources), and the ability to summon a Titan, a gargantuan, godlike being that forms the game's focal point. Critics gave Titans an average rating of 84% according to GameRankings.

== Gameplay ==
=== Atlanteans ===
The largest new addition to Titans is a new civilization, the Atlanteans. The Atlanteans have no specific hero units, but can convert most human units into a hero. Citizens have no drop off point for resources, and town centers can be built at any time during the game. Atlantean Citizens are much more effective in work than their Greek, Egyptian, or Norse counterparts and do not require drop-off points for resources; instead, harvested resources are automatically added to stockpiles. They are also slower to train, and much more expensive. Atlanteans gain favor through possessing Town Centers. The more they control, the faster the rate of favor generation.

A new unit, the Oracle, is introduced on the side of the Atlanteans. With a line of sight that expands when he stands still and a researchable ability to pick up relics, he can be very effective in the early game, but he only has one attack if upgraded to hero.

Most Atlantean human units can be transformed into heroes (including Citizens), which become a little bit better at everything they do. Myth Units, Naval Units, Siege Units, and Titans are the exceptions. As well as being strong against Myth Units, Atlantean heroes retain their own strengths and weaknesses, so, for example, Murmillo heroes are still weak against archers and strong against cavalry.

=== Titan/god powers ===
Titan worshippers have special powers, such as Kronos' ability to move buildings from one location on the map to another, or Oranos' Sky Passages, which allow instant unit transportation across the map. This can significantly affect the gameplay of older maps designed for Age of Mythology pre-expansion, as areas of maps that were inaccessible become accessible. The Earth entity Gaia has the ability to grow lush from buildings, preventing enemy players from constructing buildings nearby, as well as providing a small healing effect to said buildings. Other, lesser god powers are available to the Atlanteans at any time during the game. Unlike the other civilizations, the Atlanteans can use certain god powers multiple times. Some, like Gaia's Forest, cause a new forest to generate, which provides a far more effective wall that only villagers (or forest fires or colossi) can break through. These too may alter gameplay on older maps.

=== Myth units ===
Worshipping the Titans (Kronos, Oranos, or Gaia) entitles the player to summon one of several new myth units: the Behemoth, essentially a living regenerating siege unit; the Automaton, a robot that repairs other Automatons during breaks in the fighting; and the Argus, an indescribable creature with eyes covering its whole body, floating in the air that kills units with acid. Naval myth units include the Servant, which heals naval and coastal units and has a moderate attack, also the Man O' War, a lightning-shooting Jellyfish that causes damage to multiple units.

The Servant affects game-play by adding the option of loading up a coastal region with Servants who are not easily attacked by ground troops – thus fighting there is a serious advantage to the player with Servants. Like the Fenris Wolf that grows in attack effectiveness with numbers, the Automaton grows also in effectiveness because a large army of them can self-repair in time to be at full fighting strength before the next skirmish. These features make the Servant and Automaton particularly effective defensive units.

Another flying healer, the Caladria, and flying attack unit, the Stymphalian bird, round out the aerial myth units while the Nereid is available for naval combat. The Satyr throws spears, the Lampades unleashes the chaos power on units at range, and the Heka Gigantes generates shockwaves. Prometheans split into smaller Prometheans when killed. Planting a Hesperides tree allows players to summon Dryads, and another reusable god power puts carnivorous plants in the way of enemies.

Overall, the game favors the more offensive player in the late game and the more defensive player early (who builds up to summon the Titan or earn these powers). The Titan (also a myth unit) is the strongest useable unit in the game. Titans can only be summoned by researching "The Secrets of the Titans" in the Mythic Age. After researching the secrets, players will be able to summon a Titan Gate anywhere within their line of sight. Once it is placed, villagers must be tasked on releasing the Titan (and must protect the gate from enemy attacks until the Titan is released). The game has been criticized for having too much emphasis on the Titan, the construction of a Titan gate being now an all-or-nothing gambit to win the game: if the gate is destroyed, no new one can be built.

=== Map types ===
Titans introduces six new maps types, and seven new AI personalities. For the original civilizations, several upgrades and changes were added. The upgrade Beast Slayer causes the Greek gods' unique units to do bonus damage against Myth units. Hands of the Pharaoh lets Egyptian priests pick up Relics; a power formerly reserved for the Pharaoh unit only. Range of attack is also increased by two for Egyptian priests. The Norse gain the Axe of Muspell upgrade, which gives Throwing Axemen bonus damage against flying units.

In terms of bonuses for every civilization, the upgrade Heroic Fleet gives ships bonus damage against myth units. The non-Atlanteans can build town centers in the Classical Age in Titans, as opposed to Heroic in the original. Finally, the Titan unit is introduced to the game. Titans are huge units possessing large amounts of hitpoints and armor while having high attack.

== Plot ==
The story begins with Kronos, still trapped in Tartarus, watching the Atlanteans survive the harsh winters in the Norselands after Atlantis was destroyed 10 years ago in the events of Age of Mythology. He sends his unnamed servant to the colony, who kills the Theocrat Krios and possesses his body. "Krios" tells of a temple he saw in a vision. The Atlanteans leave the Norselands by using the foreseen temple, called a Sky Passage, and arrive at a resourceful island. Upon their arrival, Krios points out the plant-covered Temples to Oranos and Kronos, convincing everyone, including Kastor, to worship them. This angers the Greeks, who promptly attack them. The Atlanteans retaliate by destroying the entire Greek colony. The survivors tell of their defeat to General Melagius. The Atlanteans invade Melagius' city, Sikyos, and slay him. Just as the Atlanteans kill Melagius, his Egyptian and Norse allies come to aid the city. Kastor retreats, but decides to attack their homelands while they are defending Greece. In the Norselands, Kastor destroys Norse temples and replaces them with Atlantean temples. He also destroys the Tower of Odin with a god power from Kronos.

An Atlantean titan marches towards an Atlantean fortified city.

Some Atlantean forces then sail to Egypt. Queen Amanra is warned by Arkantos that the Atlanteans are coming to steal relics. Despite Amanra's efforts, the Atlanteans succeed. Arkantos protects Amanra and tells her that Kastor is being tricked. Meanwhile, Krios congratulates Kastor and shows him a Sky Passage which will take him behind Greek lines. Kastor enters it and finds himself on Mount Olympus. Using temples that change his men into myth units, Kastor slays the followers of the Olympian gods. However, once he does this, the temple to Zeus on the mountain collapses. Back in Greek territories, the Titan Prometheus and his army from Tartarus attack Sikyos. Krios announces that Kastor's actions in Greece, Egypt, and the Norselands, along with his invasion of Olympus, have weakened the Olympian gods' control over these territories and allowed titans to spawn. Krios reveals his true form and allegiance to Kronos, and flees.

Kastor is then attacked by other Atlanteans under Krios's control. Amanra meets Ajax, and aided by a flock of Rocs, they move to rescue Kastor. He expresses his regrets and journeys with Amanra and Ajax after the titans. In Egypt, they restore the Guardian (who previously aided them in Age of Mythology) and use it to slay Cerberus. Next, they travel to the Norselands, and meet King Folstag, a powerful Frost Giant whose lands are being destroyed by the Titan Ymir. With the help of Folstag and the Nidhogg Dragon, the heroes kill Ymir and restore peace.

The heroes then travel to Greece to find the countryside in flames from Prometheus's attacks. Arkantos explains that Gaia, also a Titan, has been empowered by Kastor's actions, and has been using her power to heal Greece. They spread the green lush of the benevolent Titan, weakening Prometheus and overcoming him in his weakened state. The heroes then venture back to New Atlantis, which Kastor and his army retake from Automatons, and pursue Kronos' Servant to Old Atlantis. Kronos announces his future arrival as the King of the Titans. The only way to defeat him is to plant four magical seeds to summon Gaia. After the planting of the trees, Kronos appears.

As Kronos advances to destroy any opposition, Gaia is eventually released, battling Kronos and burying him in a landslide by Tartarus, and returns to the earth. Kronos' Servant attempts to escape, but Kastor stabs him through the heart. Arkantos appears to the Atlanteans and grants Kastor rulership of the Atlantean people by giving him the Staff of Atlantis, and the Atlanteans begin to rebuild their civilization.

== Reception ==
=== Sales ===
In the United States, Titans sold over 100,000 copies by August 2006. Combined sales of the Age of Mythology franchise reached 1.3 million units in the United States by August 2006.

=== Critical reviews ===
Reception

Aggregate score
Aggregator	Score
Metacritic	84/100

Review score
Publication	Score
GameSpot	8.3/10

Titans was well received by critics, with an average score of 84 on Metacritic and GameRankings. GameSpot gave Titans an 8.3 out of ten, and commented: "There's plenty more depth to be found here since having a brand-new civilization with three new primary gods creates many more...new strategies. On the other hand, it would have been nice to see the original civilizations get fleshed out some more...because experienced Age of Mythology players will want more than just one big reason to keep playing as their favorite factions." About.com declares that the "most significant unit to come form [sic] Age of Mythology The Titans Expansion is the Titan unit itself. If you are fortunate to have the resources, these extremely expensive war machines can literally decide the outcome of the game, by destroying virtually everything in their path." IGN gave the game an 8.9 out of ten and concluded: "But as we suspected, it's an expansion well worth the wait."

Game Revolution gave the game a B+ and said: "While not innovative in any way, AOM: The Titans is everything you should expect from a quality expansion." GameSpy gave Titans a 4.5 out of five and best summed it up with: "Great new units and tons of gameplay enhancements make Age of Mythology: The Titans a model for how expansion packs should be done."
