= Stephen Rippy =

American composer (born 1975)

- Born: 1975 (age 50–51); Spring, Texas, United States
- Occupation: Musical composer
- Family: David Rippy (brother)
- Website: Official website

Stephen A. Rippy (born 1975) is an American composer from Texas who is well known for his musical compositions for the soundtracks of various video games, most notably the Age of Empires franchise by Ensemble Studios and Microsoft Games.

== Life and career ==
Rippy grew up in the Spring area of Harris County, Texas, and now resides in Plano, Texas, near Dallas. Making video game music was not Rippy's original career goal. He attended the University of Texas in the early 1990s to study visual art, and only took a few music courses.

Rippy worked for Ensemble Studios as the head of the Audio department with friend and collaborator Kevin McMullan. He is best known for his sound design and scores on the Age of Empires series, its spin-off Age of Mythology, and the Xbox 360 strategy game Halo Wars.

Ensemble was closed down shortly after the release of Halo Wars. Rippy joined Zynga Dallas (then Bonfire Studios), a development studio formed from ex-Ensemble employees and led by Rippy's brother David (who is also a composer of video game soundtracks, having previously worked with Stephen for the Age of Empires series).
