= Ensemble Studios =

American video game developer

- Type: Subsidiary
- Industry: Video games
- Founded: 1994; 32 years ago
- Founder: Tony Goodman
- Defunct: January 29, 2009; 17 years ago
- Fate: Dissolved
- Headquarters: Dallas, Texas, U.S.
- Products: Age of Empires; Age of Mythology; Halo Wars
- Owner: Microsoft
- Parent: Microsoft Game Studios

Ensemble Studios was an American video game developer. Ensemble developed many real-time strategy games, including the Age of Empires game series, Age of Mythology, and Halo Wars. It was acquired by Microsoft in 2001 and was shut down in 2009.

In addition to game development, Ensemble Studios also developed the Genie Game Engine used in Age of Empires, Age of Empires II: The Age of Kings, and Star Wars: Galactic Battlegrounds. The studio sold 20 million games and was worth an estimated $500 million.

== History ==
Ensemble Studios was founded by Tony Goodman in 1994. It borrowed the name of Ensemble Corporation, an information technology consulting firm founded by Goodman in 1991. The business was incorporated in February 1996 with his brother Rick Goodman and John Boog-Scott as co-founders. Angelo Laudon, Tim Dean, Brad Crow, Scott Winsett, Thonny Namuonglo, and Brian Sullivan were among the studio's first employees. Bruce Shelley also came on to help with Age of Empires. In 1997, Goodman sold off the consulting firm and released the game with Microsoft. The game topped one million units sold by the end of the year, and sold three million copies during its lifetime.

After six years and 8.5 million units sold, Microsoft acquired Ensemble Studios for $100 million in 2001. Ensemble remained at its original location in a high-rise office in Dallas, Texas, until April 2008 when Microsoft moved it to the Shops at Legacy in Plano. Their office was 50,000 square feet and designed to house 120 employees.

In 2008, Goodman was told about Microsoft's plans to close Ensemble. He was offered the opportunity to buy back the studio but declined. Instead, he chose to form a new company and continue working with Microsoft on Age of Empires. Ensemble had been working on a Halo MMO, which was cancelled.

Ensemble announced that it would close after the release of Halo Wars in 2009. According to multiple independent reports, all non-essential staff were laid off and remaining staff were given incentives to remain until the completion of the project. Microsoft issued an internal statement on September 10, 2008 which was then leaked to the public. The company shut down on January 29, 2009.

== Games ==
Ensemble Studios developed the Age of Empires game series of real-time strategy titles, comprising Age of Empires, Age of Empires II: The Age of Kings and Age of Empires III. They also released Age of Mythology, a spin-off from the original series. Expansion packs were also released for all its games including two for Age of Empires III. Its last release was the real-time strategy game called Halo Wars for Xbox 360.

Release Date	Title	Genre
1997	Age of Empires	real-time strategy
1998	Age of Empires: The Rise of Rome	expansion pack
1999	Age of Empires II: The Age of Kings	real-time strategy
2000	Age of Empires II: The Conquerors	expansion pack
2001	Star Wars: Galactic Battlegrounds	real-time strategy
2002	Age of Mythology	real-time strategy
2002	Star Wars: Galactic Battlegrounds Clone Campaigns	expansion pack
2003	Age of Mythology: The Titans	expansion pack
2005	Age of Empires III	real-time strategy
2006	Age of Empires III: The WarChiefs	expansion pack
2007	Age of Empires III: The Asian Dynasties	expansion pack
2009	Halo Wars	real-time strategy
Cancelled	Titan (Halo MMO)	massively multiplayer online game
Cancelled	Sorcerer	fantasy-adventure RPG
Cancelled	Nova	
Cancelled	Wrench	platform game
Cancelled	Bam	
Cancelled	Agent	

== Legacy ==
Many development companies have originated from Ensemble Studios. In 1998, Rick Goodman left the company and started a new independent studio, Stainless Steel Studios. In 2000, Brian Sullivan left Ensemble Studios and started a new independent studio, Iron Lore Entertainment, to develop the action role-playing game Titan Quest.

At the time of the studio's closure, several former employees were in the process of starting their own companies.

Newtoy, Inc., was formed in 2008 by brothers David and Paul Bettner, developers from Ensemble. The McKinney, Texas-based company released Chess With Friends for the iPhone in November 2008 and the wildly popular Words With Friends in August 2009. In 2011, Zynga acquired Newtoy for $53 million and renamed the company Zynga With Friends, a moniker off of Newtoy's successful 'with friends' series. The brothers left the company in 2012. Paul started a company in 2013 to develop for the Android-based Ouya gaming system.

In February 2009, Goodman and a number of Ensemble veterans started a new independent studio, Robot Entertainment. It developed the free-to-play Age of Empires Online for Microsoft. At the same time, producer David Rippy started Bonfire Studios, composed entirely of former Ensemble staff members. Bonfire was acquired by Zynga in 2010 and renamed Zynga Dallas.

In March 2009, ex-staffer Dusty Monk formed Windstorm Studios, a one-man company. It closed on March 21, 2012, and Monk joined Robot Entertainment.

In June 2013, David Rippy, Scott Winsett, and Bill Jackson formed Boss Fight Entertainment. The company developed mobile games and was located in McKinney, Texas. It was acquired by Netflix Inc. in 2022. After developing Netflix Stories and Squid Game: Unleashed, the studio was shut down in 2025.
