= Bruce Shelley =

American board and video game designer

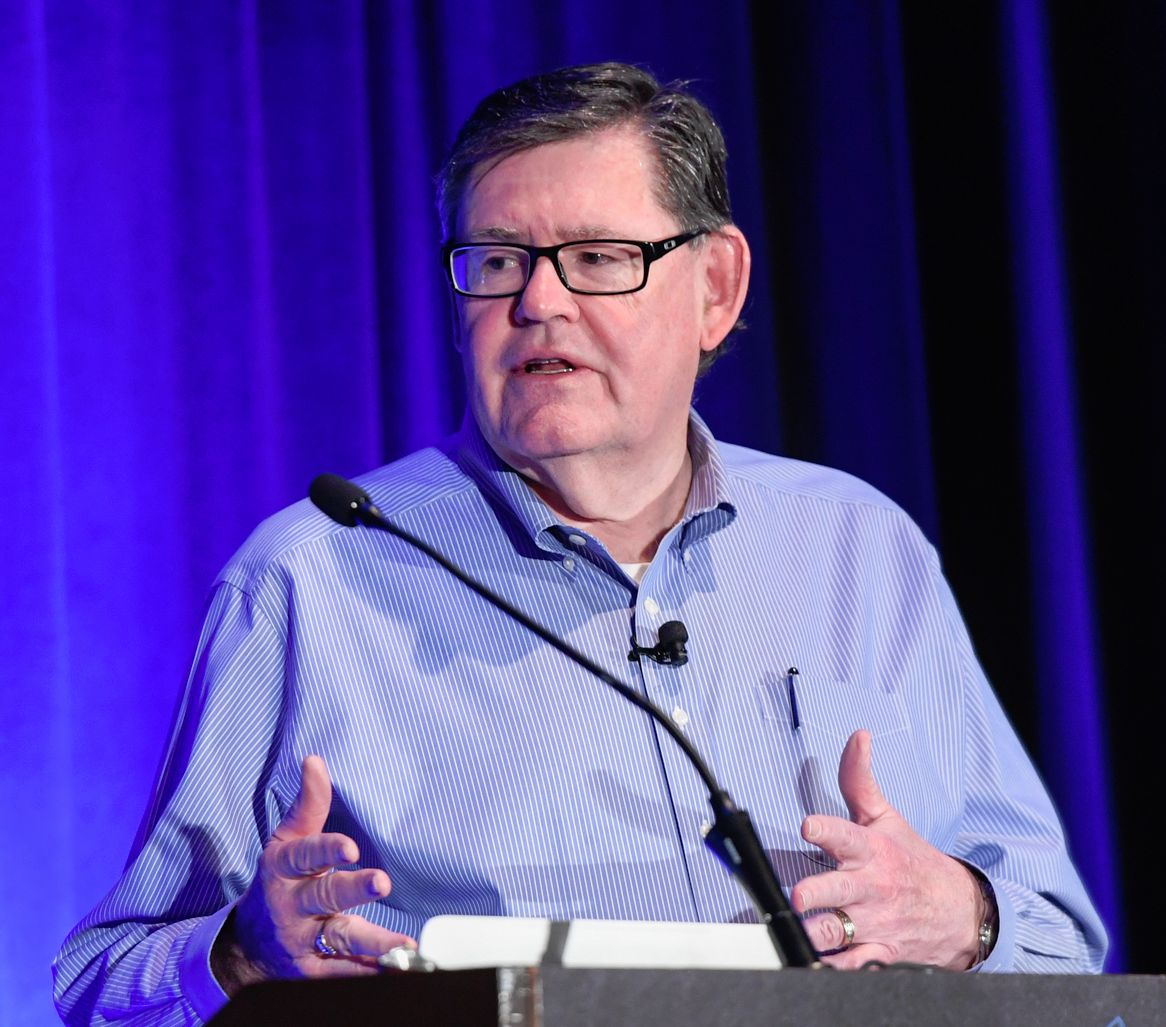
Bruce Shelley at the 2017 Game Developers Conference

Bruce Campbell Shelley is an American board and video game designer. He is primarily associated as the co-designer of the video games Railroad Tycoon and Civilization with Sid Meier, and later the Age of Empires series.

Shelley had worked with Avalon Hill to develop a number of board games for the company, including 1830: The Game of Railroads and Robber Barons, inspired by Francis Tresham's railroad-based game 1829. Around 1988, Shelley recognized that the board game market was weakening against the growing video game market, and was able to get a position at Meier's Microprose. Shelley soon became Meier's direct assistant to designing new video games, several of which were inspired by Shelley's past board game experience. Their first collaboration, Railroad Tycoon, was partially based on Shelley's work on 1830. Subsequently, the two worked together to create Civilization.

The person who hired Shelley left the company after one year and gradually Shelley become one of the lowest paid coworkers in MicroProse. Due to these developments, as well as a changing atmosphere at Microprose, Shelley left the company by the end of 1992 and later joined Ensemble Studios. There, he brought ideas from Civilization and led the development of the early titles in the Age of Empires series, first released in 1997. Through fellow designers Brian Reynolds and Dave Pottinger, Shelley has also worked for games with Zynga. He is currently working with a Texas-based company known as Bonusxp.

In 1999, Shelley was described by the PC Gamer Magazine as one of the "25 Game Gods" and Gamespy, in 2002 as the eight-most influential game developer.

Between 2000 and 2006, he was a member of the Board of Directors of the Academy of Interactive Arts & Sciences. He was inducted into the academy's Hall of Fame in 2009.
