= List of PC games (R) =

The following page is an alphabetical section from the list of PC games.

== R ==
| Name | Developer | Publisher | Genre(s) | Operating system(s) | Date released |
|---|---|---|---|---|---|
| Rage | id Software | Bethesda Softworks | First-person shooter, action-adventure, vehicular combat, racing | Microsoft Windows | October 4, 2011 |
| Railroad Tycoon | MicroProse | MicroProse | Business simulation | MS-DOS, Amiga, macOS, Atari ST | 1990 |
| Railroad Tycoon 3 | PopTop Software | Gathering of Developers | Business simulation | Microsoft Windows, macOS | October 27, 2003 |
| Rain World | Videocult | Akupara Games, Adult Swim Games | Platform, survival | Microsoft Windows | March 28, 2017 |
| Raft | Redbeet Interactive | Axolot Games | Survival, sandbox | Microsoft Windows | June 20, 2022 |
| Ratchet & Clank: Rift Apart | Insomniac Games | Sony Interactive Entertainment | Platformer, action-adventure | Microsoft Windows | July 26, 2023 |
| Rayman | Ubisoft | Ubisoft | Platformer | MS-DOS | April 30, 1996 |
| Rayman 2: The Great Escape | Ubisoft | Ubisoft | Platformer | Microsoft Windows | October 31, 1999 |
| Rayman 3: Hoodlum Havoc | Ubisoft | Ubisoft | Platformer | Microsoft Windows | March 24, 2003 |
| Rayman Legends | Ubisoft | Ubisoft | Platformer | Microsoft Windows | September 3, 2013 |
| Rayman M/Arena | Ubisoft | Ubisoft | Party | Microsoft Windows | August 31, 2002 |
| Rayman Origins | Ubisoft | Ubisoft | Platformer | Microsoft Windows | March 29, 2012 |
| Ready or Not | VOID Interactive | VOID Interactive | Tactical shooter | Microsoft Windows | December 13, 2023 |
| Realm Royale | Heroic Leap Games | Hi-Rez Studios | Battle royale, Hero shooter | Microsoft Windows | June 5, 2018 |
| Rebel Galaxy | Double Damage Games | Double Damage Games | Space trading, action | Microsoft Windows, macOS | October 20, 2015 |
| Rebel Galaxy Outlaw | Double Damage Games | Double Damage Games | Space trading, action | Microsoft Windows | August 13, 2019 |
| Recettear: An Item Shop's Tale | EasyGameStation | Carpe Fulgur | RPG | Microsoft Windows | September 10, 2010 |
| Rec Room | Against Gravity | Against Gravity | Action RPG, first-person shooter | Microsoft Windows | June 28, 2016 |
| Red Dead Redemption | Double Eleven | Rockstar Games | Action-adventure | Microsoft Windows | October 29, 2024 |
| Red Dead Redemption 2 | Rockstar Studios | Rockstar Games | Action-adventure | Microsoft Windows | November 5, 2019 |
| Red Orchestra: Ostfront 41-45 | Tripwire Interactive | Bold Games | Tactical shooter, first-person shooter | Microsoft Windows, Linux, macOS | March 14, 2006 |
| Red Orchestra 2: Heroes of Stalingrad | Tripwire Interactive | 1C Company | Tactical shooter, first-person shooter | Microsoft Windows | September 13, 2011 |
| Redshirt | The Tiniest Shark | Positech Games | Simulation game | Microsoft Windows | November 13, 2013 |
| Reign of Kings | CodeHatch | | Sandbox, first-person shooter | Microsoft Windows | March 11, 2015 |
| Resident Evil | Capcom | Capcom | Survival horror | Microsoft Windows | March 22, 1996 |
| Resident Evil 2 (1998) | Capcom | Capcom | Survival horror | Microsoft Windows | January 21, 1998 |
| Resident Evil 2 (2019) | Capcom | Capcom | Survival horror | Microsoft Windows, macOS | January 25, 2019 |
| Resident Evil 3: Nemesis | Capcom | Capcom | Survival horror | Microsoft Windows | September 22, 1999 |
| Resident Evil 3 | Capcom | Capcom | Survival horror | Microsoft Windows, macOS | April 3, 2020 |
| Resident Evil 4 (2005) | Capcom Production Studio 4 | Capcom | Survival horror | Microsoft Windows | March 1, 2007 |
| Resident Evil 4 (2023) | Capcom | Capcom | Survival horror | Microsoft Windows, macOS | March 24, 2023 |
| Resident Evil 5 | Capcom | Capcom | Action-adventure, third-person shooter | Microsoft Windows | March 5, 2009 |
| Resident Evil 6 | Capcom | Capcom | Action-adventure, third-person shooter | Microsoft Windows | October 2, 2012 |
| Resident Evil 7: Biohazard | Capcom | Capcom | Survival horror | Microsoft Windows, macOS | January 24, 2017 |
| Resident Evil: Operation Raccoon City | Slant Six Games, Capcom | Capcom | Action-adventure, third-person shooter | Microsoft Windows | March 20, 2012 |
| Resident Evil: Resistance | Capcom | Capcom | Survival horror, asymmetric multiplayer | Microsoft Windows | April 3, 2020 |
| Resident Evil Requiem | Capcom | Capcom | Survival horror | Microsoft Windows | February 27, 2026 |
| Resident Evil: Revelations | Capcom, Tose Co. Ltd | Capcom | Action, survival horror | Microsoft Windows | January 26, 2012 |
| Resident Evil: Revelations 2 | Capcom | Capcom | Action, survival horror | Microsoft Windows | Episode 1 / Episode 2 / Episode 3 / Episode 4; February 24, 2015 / March 3, 2015 / March 10, 2015 / March 17, 2015 |
| Resident Evil Village | Capcom | Capcom | Survival horror | Microsoft Windows, macOS | May 7, 2021 |
| R.E.P.O. | Semiwork | Semiwork | Survival horror, co-op | Microsoft Windows | February 26, 2025 |
| Retrobooster | Really Slick | Really Slick | Action, arcade, multidirectional shooter | Microsoft Windows, Linux | February 21, 2014 |
| Return of the Obra Dinn | 3909 LLC | 3909 LLC | Adventure, Puzzle | Microsoft Windows, macOS | October 18, 2018 |
| Return to Monkey Island | Terrible Toybox | Devolver Digital | Adventure | Microsoft Windows | September 19, 2022 |
| Richard Burns Rally | Warthog Games | SCi Games | Racing game | Microsoft Windows | July 9, 2004 |
| Ricochet | Valve | | First-person shooter | Microsoft Windows, Linux, macOS | November 1, 2000 |
| Ride | Milestone srl | Milestone srl | Racing game | Microsoft Windows | March 27, 2015 |
| RimWorld | Ludeon Studios | Ludeon Studios | Construction and management simulation | Microsoft Windows, Linux, macOS | October 17, 2018 |
| Rise of Nations | Big Huge Games | Microsoft Game Studios | Real-time strategy | Microsoft Windows, macOS | May 20, 2003 |
| Rise of Nations: Thrones and Patriots | Big Huge Games | Microsoft Game Studios | Real-time strategy | Microsoft Windows, macOS | April 21, 2004 |
| Rise of Nations: Rise of Legends | Big Huge Games | Microsoft Game Studios | Real-time strategy | Microsoft Windows, macOS | May 9, 2006 |
| Rise of the Tomb Raider | Crystal Dynamics | Square Enix | Action-adventure | Microsoft Windows | January 28, 2016 |
| Risk | BlueSky Software, NMS Software | Hasbro Interactive | Turn-based strategy, board game | Microsoft Windows | 1996 |
| Risk II | Deep Red Games | Hasbro Interactive | Turn-based strategy, board game | Microsoft Windows | 2000 |
| Rivals 2 | Aether Studios | Aether Studios | Platform fighter | Microsoft Windows | 2024 |
| Roadwarden | Moral Anxiety Studio | Assemble Entertainment | RPG | Microsoft Windows, Linux, macOS | September 12, 2022 |
| Roblox | Roblox Corporation | Roblox Corporation | Sandbox | Microsoft Windows | September 1, 2006 |
| Roblox Rivals | Nosniy Games | Roblox Corporation | First-person shooter, multiplayer shooter, competitive shooter | Microsoft Windows, iOS, Console | June 24, 2024 |
| RoboCop: Rogue City | Teyon | Nacon | First-person shooter | Microsoft Windows | November 2, 2023 |
| Robot Roller-Derby Disco Dodgeball | Erik Asmussen | 82 Apps | First-person shooter | Microsoft Windows, Linux, macOS | March 28, 2014 |
| Rock 'n' Roll Adventures | Data Design Interactive | Data Design Interactive | Platform | Microsoft Windows | September 17, 2007 |
| Rocket League | Psyonix | Psyonix | Vehicular Soccer | Microsoft Windows | July 7, 2015 |
| Rollerdrome | Roll7 | Private Division | Third-person shooter, sports | Microsoft Windows | August 16, 2022 |
| RollerCoaster Tycoon | Chris Sawyer Productions | Hasbro Interactive, MicroProse | Simulation game | Microsoft Windows | March 31, 1999 |
| RollerCoaster Tycoon 2 | Chris Sawyer Productions | Infogrames | Simulation game | Microsoft Windows | October 15, 2002 |
| RollerCoaster Tycoon 3 | Frontier Developments | Atari | Simulation game | Microsoft Windows, macOS | October 26, 2004 |
| Rome: Total War | The Creative Assembly | Sega | Turn-based strategy | Microsoft Windows, macOS | November 22, 2004 |
| Rome: Total War: Alexander | The Creative Assembly, Feral Interactive | Activision, Sega, Feral Interactive | Turn-based strategy | Microsoft Windows, macOS | June 19, 2006 |
| Rome: Total War: Barbarian Invasion | The Creative Assembly | Activision, Sega | Turn-based strategy | Microsoft Windows, macOS | September 27, 2005 |
| Rotwood | Klei Entertainment | Klei Entertainment | Beat 'em up; Roguelike | Microsoft Windows | March 3, 2026 |
| Roundabout | No Goblin LLC | No Goblin LLC | Open-world driving game | Microsoft Windows, OS X, Linux | September 18, 2014 |
| RuneScape | Jagex | Jagex | MMORPG | Microsoft Windows, Linux, macOS | January 4, 2001 |
| Rust | Facepunch Studios | Facepunch Studios | Open world | Microsoft Windows, Linux, macOS | December 11, 2013 |
| Russian Fishing 4 | FishSoft LLC | FishSoft LLC | Fishing, simulation, MMO | Microsoft Windows | November 10, 2021 |
| RV There Yet? | Nuggets Entertainment | Nuggets Entertainment | Action, adventure, co-op | Microsoft Windows | October 21, 2025 |
| Ryse: Son of Rome | Crytek | Microsoft Studios, Crytek | Action-adventure, hack and slash | Microsoft Windows | October 10, 2014 |
