= Rise of Nations (disambiguation) =

Rise of Nations is a real-time strategy video game.

Rise of Nations may also refer to:

- Rise of Nations: Thrones and Patriots, the expansion pack to the original game
  - Rise of Nations: Extended Edition, the re-release of the original game and the expansion
- Rise of Nations: Rise of Legends, a real-time strategy fantasy spin-off of the series
