= Brian Reynolds (game designer) =

American videogame designer

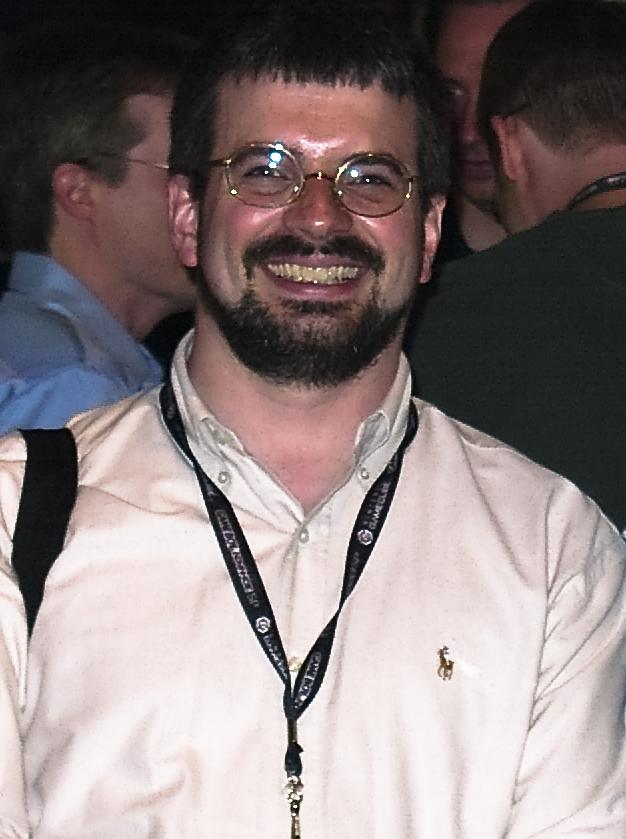
- Reynolds at E3 in 2003
- Born: 1967 (age 58–59)
- Education: University of the South
- Occupation: Videogame Designer
- Spouse: Jill Reynolds

Brian Reynolds (born 1967) is an American videogame designer. Reynolds has designed at SecretNewCo, Zynga, Big Huge Games, and MicroProse and has been chairman of the International Game Developers Association. He has played a major part in designing a number of multi-million selling games including Civilization II, Rise of Nations, Sid Meier's Alpha Centauri, and FrontierVille. He has also founded or co-founded three game companies, SecretNewCo, Big Huge Games, and Firaxis Games.

== Early life and education ==
Reynolds made his first game sale with Quest 1 to SoftSide magazine, its August 1981 cover feature. He was a gamer in high school, and a SysOp on Randolph School's (Huntsville, Alabama) PDP-11 mainframe computer. A 1990 graduate of the University of the South, Reynolds briefly pursued graduate studies in philosophy at the University of California, Berkeley.

== Career ==
Reynolds initiated his game career with MicroProse where he worked as lead programmer for a number of graphic adventure games. These included Rex Nebular in 1992 and Return of the Phantom and Dragonsphere in 1993.

It was at MicroProse where Reynolds first worked with Sid Meier and the two collaborated on a strategy title by the name of Sid Meier's Colonization which was released in 1994. Reynolds went on to become lead designer for a sequel to Sid Meier's Civilization. Civilization II was released in 1996 and has sold "about 3 million" copies.

While at Firaxis, Reynolds contributed to Sid Meier's Gettysburg in 1997, followed by the creation and design of Sid Meier's Alpha Centauri in 1998. Alpha Centauri became his second multi-million selling title. In 2000 Reynolds left Firaxis games and sold his share in the company to become CEO of Big Huge Games.

On June 30, 2009, Zynga announced that Brian Reynolds was leaving Big Huge Games to lead the formation of Zynga East, and serve the role of Chief Game Designer.

In February 2013, Reynolds left Zynga. In March, he revived Big Huge Games (temporarily known as SecretNewCo). In July, the team announced their partnership with Nexon, a South Korean game developer, to develop their first game, DomiNations, a mobile game similar to Civilization or Age of Empires.

Big Huge Games was acquired by Nexon in 2016.

== Contributions ==
Although marketed under Sid Meier's name, Civilization II, Sid Meier's Colonization and Sid Meier's Alpha Centauri all credited Reynolds as lead designer. The credits for Civilization II only list Meier as the designer of the original Civilization game, and Reynolds stated in an interview that for this game Meier "was no longer involved except in name." The credits for Alpha Centauri state that the game was "Created by" Brian Reynolds and Meier is listed with several other team members on the "With" line - in the Designers Notes in the game manual Reynolds also thanks him for all his sage advice.

Brian Reynolds' first major break was the design of Sid Meier's Civilization II. Meier had created Civilization but had moved on to other projects. MicroProse wanted to make a sequel and asked Reynolds to design it. MicroProse put Meier on retainer for consultational advice and for the use of his name, but Meier only had peripheral involvement in the design of this game. The sequel game, hence, was primarily designed by Reynolds.

Rise of Nations was Reynolds' first game at Big Huge Games. Later came Rise of Legends, a real-time strategy game, published by Microsoft.

Reynolds and Klaus Teuber collaborated to develop the Xbox Live Arcade game Catan.

Reynolds led the development of FrontierVille and CityVille 2 for Facebook.

== Games ==
| Year | Title | Role | Publisher |
|---|---|---|---|
| 1981 | Quest 1 | Author | Softside |
| 1992 | Rex Nebular and the Cosmic Gender Bender | Lead programmer | MicroProse |
| 1993 | Return of the Phantom | Lead programmer | MicroProse |
| 1994 | Dragonsphere | Technical director | MicroProse |
| 1994 | Sid Meier's Colonization | Designer and programmer | MicroProse |
| 1996 | Sid Meier's Civilization II | Lead designer and programmer | MicroProse |
| 1997 | Sid Meier's Gettysburg! | Designer and programmer | Electronic Arts |
| 1999 | Sid Meier's Alpha Centauri | Lead designer | Electronic Arts |
| 2003 | Rise of Nations | Lead designer | Microsoft Game Studios |
| 2004 | Rise of Nations: Thrones & Patriots | Lead designer | Microsoft Game Studios |
| 2006 | Rise of Nations: Rise of Legends | Project lead and lead designer | Microsoft Game Studios |
| 2007 | Catan | Project lead and AI | Big Huge Games |
| 2007 | Age of Empires 3: The Asian Dynasties | Creative director | Microsoft Game Studios |
| 2010 | FrontierVille | Chief game designer | Zynga |
| 2014 | DomiNations | Chief game designer | Nexon |
