= Catan (2007 video game) =

- The Xbox Live Arcade cover
- Developer: Big Huge Games
- Publisher: Big Huge Games
- Platform: Xbox 360
- Release: May 2, 2007
- Genre: Turn-based strategy
- Modes: Single-player, Multiplayer

Catan was the Xbox Live Arcade version of Klaus Teuber's The Settlers of Catan, developed by Big Huge Games in collaboration with Teuber. It was released on May 2, 2007. It is the first German-style board game to be released on Xbox Live Arcade, which was followed by Carcassonne.

The game has since been removed from Xbox Live Arcade and is no longer available to purchase.

== Development ==
During an interview with Big Huge Games founder Brian Reynolds, it was revealed that Microsoft approached Big Huge Games with the idea for the project. As part of the same interview, Klaus Teuber's collaboration on the project was explained, noting that he was instrumental in helping Reynolds create the AI, using notes and statistics he had generated years ago but had never previously been able to apply.

Reynolds later stated, regarding the board game, "The design is so elegant you can teach someone to play in minutes and then spend years trying to master it. With our expertise in interface design and artificial intelligence, it seemed like a natural fit for the project!"

Teuber has fully endorsed the Big Huge Games version, claiming that the game has exceeded his expectations and noting that he himself has lost several games in a row to the AI. The rules of the computerized version are faithful to the original, with one exception suggested by Teuber himself; the number of resource cards held by players is not limited to the number of resource cards which came with the board game. This was the original design intent, but one which couldn't be implemented due to the necessity to include only a finite number of physical cards in game boxes.

== Features ==
Typical gameplay screenshot.

As with the traditional board game, Catan uses a game board composed of 19 randomly arranged hexagonal tiles, each representing a different type of terrain or resource. Through strategy, luck, and skillful negotiation, 3 or 4 players vie to be the first to earn 10 victory points. This is done through building and enlarging settlements, by establishing the largest army, by building the longest road, or through the use of certain development cards.

Catan claims to have the best Settlers of Catan artificial intelligence to date, featuring thirteen unique AI personalities for single player play and multiplayer games with fewer than four humans. Each AI personality, portrayed by a likeness of a famous leader or general (e.g. Abraham Lincoln, Alexander the Great, Cleopatra, etc.), has attributes such as their preferred strategy for winning, how quickly they like to expand, and their favorite resource. Three difficulty levels (easy, medium, and hard) control the level of expertise displayed by these opponents.

The game features two different "skins" for the game board. The first is a traditional flat view of the board, while the second is a "living world", showing the board as a 3D environment. The board can be rotated during gameplay to provide the desired view, and users can also tweak other visual options such as player colors (for those who are color blind).

As is typical of Xbox Live Arcade games, the game features online play and leaderboards. Separate leaderboards are used to display single player and multiplayer rankings. Unlike many games which keep the TrueSkill level of the players hidden, Catan displays the calculated current values on one of the leaderboards.

Gameplay is turn-based, but turn timers are used to prevent individual players from halting the progression of the game. While not accessible in ranked matches, custom matches can make use of user-defined "House Rules". Items which can be tweaked include the turn timer, how resource production works, rules for the thief/robber, and several others.

In all types of matches, players can use graphical "ticklers" (or "emotes") to communicate thoughts or feelings, including love or hatred of the dice and/or other players. Similar devices, referred to as "Fooms", were previously available in the Hardwood series of Xbox Live Arcade games. These can be used as an alternative to voice chat (which is supported but not required) in order to, for example, encourage opponents to "sweeten a deal" or warn that they are too close to winning. The ticklers are used by AI players to indicate their "mood" in response to a player's actions; pleasing AIs will influence them to treat the player as an ally (though not to the point of jeopardizing their position), while angering them will serve to focus their negative attention. AI players will react to player-directed emotes towards them as well.

== Downloadable content ==
Less than a week after the title's release, a separate theme pack ("Themes Pack 1") and picture pack ("Generals Picture Pack 1") were made available for download.

On May 31, 2007 a "Mayfair" skin pack (to change the visual representation of the game to the United States version of the board game) was available, as well another gamertag picture pack ("Generals Picture Pack 2").

On June 13, 2007, a "Generals" AI expansion pack was released which added additional computer-controlled opponents, including Joan of Arc, Hannibal, and Tokugawa.

== Reception ==
Reception

Aggregate score
Aggregator	Score
Metacritic	81/100

Review scores
Publication	Score
4Players	85%
The A.V. Club	B+
Eurogamer	7/10
GameSpot	7.9/10
Hardcore Gamer	4/5
IGN	7.7/10
Jeuxvideo.com	15/20
Official Xbox Magazine (US)	8/10
PALGN	7.5/10
TeamXbox	8.6/10
411Mania	8.1/10

The game received "favorable" reviews according to the review aggregation website Metacritic. Official Xbox Magazine gave it a favorable review while it was still in development.

Reviews of the game have generally found it to be a solid adaptation of the classic board game, but noting that it inherently limited the game's audience. While those who enjoy slower-paced strategy games will likely find the title a good value, the pace won't appeal to players who demand more action. The user interface has been well received, with the trading interface receiving wide praise, although reviews note several negatives as well, including the title's lack of support for the Xbox Live Vision camera and the absence of a local multiplayer option. Additionally, the game uses a relatively small text font which may be hard to read on smaller televisions, although the developers have stated that the game uses separate fonts for high-definition and standard-definition displays.

Customer reactions had been strongly positive, with the game debuting third in sales in its first week of availability.

== See also ==
- Carcassonne (video game)
- Lost Cities (video game)
- Ticket to Ride (video game)
