= Pioneer Trail =

Pioneer Trail may refer to:

- The Pioneer Trail, video game
- Pioneer Trail (film), 1938 American film
