= Chantelise – A Tale of Two Sisters =

2006 video game

- Developer(s): EasyGameStation
- Publisher(s): JP: EasyGameStation; EU: DHM Interactive; WW: Carpe Fulgur
- Platform(s): Windows
- Release: JP: 2006; EU: January 2010; WW: July 29, 2011
- Genre(s): Action RPG
- Mode(s): Single-player

Chantelise – A Tale of Two Sisters (シャンテリーゼ, Shanterīze) is an indie action role-playing and Dungeon crawler video game. The game was developed by EasyGameStation for Windows.

== Development ==
It was originally released in Japan in 2006. The game was localized into non-Japanese languages twice; first by DHM Interactive in January 2010 at physical retail in a release that did not leave continental Europe and an English version was released World Wide on Steam and GamersGate on July 29, 2011.

== Gameplay and plot ==
The player takes control of a character named Chante, on a quest to find the witch who cursed her sister, Elise, by turning her into a fairy in order to turn her back into a person.

The player explores multiple forests and towns across five different chapters; with every chapter separated by an elemental themed dungeon.

The game’s graphical content is built off of two-dimensional sprites placed onto a three-dimensional background, similar to games seen frequently on the PlayStation 1.

== Reception ==
Reception

Aggregate scores
Aggregator	Score
GameRankings	65.92/100
Metacritic	62/100

Review score
Publication	Score
IGN	5.0/10.0

The game sold over 50,000 units. Overall the game was given mediocre reviews according to IGN, Metacritic, and Gamerankings.

== See also ==
- Recettear: An Item Shop's Tale
