= Operation Sabotage =

1982 video game

- Publisher(s): SoftSide
- Designer(s): Ray Sato
- Programmer(s): Ray Sato (TRS-80); Rich Bouchard (Atari); Ron Shaker (Apple II); Fred Condo & Kerry Shetline (IBM PC)
- Platform(s): TRS-80, Atari 8-bit, Apple II, IBM PC
- Release: 1982
- Genre(s): Interactive fiction
- Mode(s): Single-player

Operation Sabotage is a text adventure game by Ray Sato for the TRS-80 and published by SoftSide Magazine in 1982. It was ported by Rich Bouchard to the Atari 8-bit computers and translated for Apple II by Ron Shaker and later the IBM PC by Fred Condo & Kerry Shetline. The game was republished in The Best of SoftSide (1983), which also included the program on an accompanying 5¼-inch floppy disk.
