= Quest 1 =

1981 video game

- Logo and title illustration from Best of SoftSide
- Publisher: SoftSide
- Designer: Brian Reynolds
- Programmers: TRS-80; Brian Reynolds; Apple II; Rich Bouchard; Atari 8-bit Alan J. Zett
- Platforms: TRS-80, Apple II, Atari 8-bit
- Release: 1981
- Genre: Role-playing video game
- Mode: Single-player

Quest 1 is a single-player role-playing game originally written for the TRS-80 and translated for the Apple II and Atari 8-bit computers. Published by SoftSide Magazine in 1981 as a type-in program, it is the first-known published game by Brian Reynolds. Quest 1 was republished in The Best of SoftSide (1983) and released on accompanying 5¼-inch floppy disks.
