= Escape from the Dungeons of the Gods =

1982 video game

- Publisher: SoftSide
- Designer: Ray Sato
- Programmers: Ray Sato (TRS-80); Alex Lee (Apple); Rich Bouchard (Atari)
- Platforms: Apple II, Atari 8-bit, TRS-80
- Release: August 1982
- Genre: Interactive fiction
- Mode: Single-player

Escape from the Dungeons of the Gods is a single-player text adventure written by Ray Sato for the TRS-80. The original and versions for the Atari 8-bit computers and Apple II were published in the August 1982 issue of SoftSide. It was subsequently republished in The Best of SoftSide (1983) and released on accompanying 5¼-inch floppy disks.
