= Rex Nebular and the Cosmic Gender Bender =

1992 video game

- Developer: MPS Labs
- Publisher: MicroProse
- Producer: Matt Gruson
- Designer: Matt Gruson
- Programmer: Brian Reynolds
- Artist: Kenn Nishiuye
- Composer: Jeff Briggs
- Engine: MicroProse Adventure Development System
- Platforms: MS-DOS, Classic Mac OS
- Release: NA: November 1992; EU: 1992; NA: 1993 (Mac)
- Genre: Adventure
- Mode: Single-player

Rex Nebular and the Cosmic Gender Bender is a point-and-click adventure game developed and published by MicroProse. It was released in November 1992 for MS-DOS and Classic Mac OS. The game is the first graphical adventure game developed by MicroProse, preceding Return of the Phantom and Dragonsphere. It was created using the MicroProse Adventure Development system and uses 256 colour graphics. Tommo purchased the rights to this game and digitally released it through its Retroism brand in 2015.

== Plot ==
The bumbling bachelor, Rex Nebular, has been hired by Colonel Stone to retrieve a vase that holds some sentimental value for 75,000 galactars. Rex agrees and sets out for the last known location of the vase.

Rex discovers that the planet where the vase was last known to reside has vanished, but his ship's sensors still detect a planetary mass and gravitational field, invisible to the naked eye. Suddenly a large warship decloaks behind him, and fires. His ship is badly damaged and is sent crash landing on the strange planet, seemingly inhabited by women only.

Rex waking up after crash landing. Verb commands and inventory are at the bottom of the screen.

Decades ago, a vicious war between the sexes erupted on the planet. In the end, the females wiped out the male population with bio-weapons. As a result, the females were no longer able to become pregnant, so they had no way of continuing their species. They invented a machine that would allow them to alter their sex for short periods of time. This machine became known as the Cosmic Gender Bender (or the Gender Bender for short).

The populace of the planet is divided into two classes, Keepers and (breeding) Stock. The Keepers are technologically advanced and reside underground, where they monitor the Stock. The Stock reside above ground and have a primitive culture. Their only purpose is to be impregnated by a gender bent Keeper in order to repopulate the planet.

== Gameplay ==
The game is divided into three difficulty levels. Higher difficulties have more puzzles and more death encounters. The left mouse button is used for selecting options and performing actions and the right mouse button is used to look at things (an alternative to selecting the 'look' option and selecting where). Some actions like sitting on a chair are automatically performed with just a left click. To get from one room to another the mouse pointer changes to a 'GO' icon where travel is possible. To get from one place to another, Rex will need to make use of teleporters correctly entering the code.

There are 10 different options, two of which are used to interact with people and seven of which are used to interact with objects. Items that are picked up have their own sub-options, most of which the protagonist Rex would not actually do (such as disassembling his binoculars). The player must also take care to prevent Rex getting killed which can happen in many places. Although Rex can die, the game has unlimited chances and the Rex's last safe position will be restored after death.

For the artwork, MicroProse customised their own image processing tools for 3D-rendering allowing for smooth animation with lossless quality and minimal disk space usage.

== Reception ==
Reception

Review scores
Publication	Score
Adventure Gamers	3.5/5
Dragon	5/5
Adventure Classic Gaming	3/5

Computer Gaming World opined that Rex Nebular had "impressive" sound, graphics, and rotoscoped animation. While the magazine called the plot "nothing new", it described the game as "a solid move into the adventure gaming genre [with] the same attention to detail that has won MicroProse raves in other products", and a good first attempt at competing with LucasArts and Sierra On-Line.
