= Return of the Phantom =

1993 video game

- Developer: MPS Labs
- Publisher: MicroProse
- Producer: Matt Gruson
- Designer: Raymond Benson
- Programmer: Brian Reynolds
- Artist: Kenn Nishiuye
- Writer: Raymond Benson
- Composer: Michael Bross
- Platform: MS-DOS
- Release: 1993
- Genre: Adventure
- Mode: Single-player

Return of the Phantom is a point-and-click graphic adventure game developed and published by MicroProse in 1993. It was produced by Matt Gruson and designed/written by future James Bond novelist Raymond Benson. It is based on the 1910 novel The Phantom of the Opera by Gaston Leroux.

The game was the second graphical adventure game developed by MicroProse, following Rex Nebular and preceding Dragonsphere. It was developed using the MicroProse Adventure Development system, and made use of 256-colour graphics. A CD version featuring full voices for the characters was also released.

== Plot ==
The Palais Garnier is in the midst of the world premiere of Don Juan Triumphant when the enormous chandelier adorning the domed ceiling of the auditorium plunges into the middle of the stalls and kills several members of the audience. The player takes the role of Raoul Montand, a detective from the Sûreté and patron of the Opera. The manager, Monsieur Brie, suspects the Phantom may be the cause and has Raoul investigate. Raoul encounters the leading actress of the show, Christine Florent, who has received a note from the Phantom which threatens her. Some time later, Christine is found strangled by the Phantom. Raoul goes to the catwalk where the Phantom appears and pushes him off the edge. Then, he awakens to find himself transported back in time to the year 1881 where he is mistaken for the Viscount Raoul de Chagny.

During a production, Erik captures Christine Daaé. After a great deal of work and exploring, Raoul enters the Phantom's lair and rescues Christine, but the Phantom appears once more and re-captures Christine. Raoul climbs to the chandelier and does battle with the Phantom, eventually causing the chandelier to fall and kill both men. Raoul awakens back in his own time, where none of the events related to the Phantom seem to have taken place, but before the credits begin the Phantom's shadow is seen behind him.

== Characters ==
- Raoul Montand (Voiced by Stuart W. Howard): The player character; an investigator of the French Secret Police: The Sûreté.
- Christine Florent (Voiced by Jonathan Caspian-Kaufman): The present opera star; somehow connected with Christine Daae.
- Christine Daaé (Voiced by Jonathan Caspian-Kaufman): A simple-minded girl from Sweden; the woman whom the Phantom loves.
- Monsieur Brie (Voiced by Raymond Benson): The present opera manager.
- Monsieur Richard (Voiced by Douglas Kaufman): Opera manager of the past.
- Madame Giry (Voiced by Lynne Siglar): The Phantom's box-keeper; knows that Raoul is from the future.
- Jacques (Voiced by Nick Raye): A man who knows a great deal about the Phantom; is eventually killed.
- Julie Giry (Voiced by Dorianne Weaver): A descendant of Madame Giry who also knows about the Phantom.
- Charles (Voiced by Steven Zumbrun): Present day stage master.
- Edgar Degas (Voiced by Douglas Kaufman): An artist interested in painting pictures of ballerinas; somehow knows that Raoul is from the future.
- Erik, the Phantom of the Opera (Voiced by Greg Kemper): The main antagonist throughout the entire game.

== Reception ==
QuestBusters called Return of the Phantom "a high quality game with few bugs" and praised the game for having used professional actors, a designer with real-world experience in Broadway theatre, and an original "Bach inspired" score. The magazine wrote that "Micro Prose uses their own unique adaptation of the classical animation overlaying process, producing a very life-like final animation video. Numerous digitized sound effects round off the experience."

Computer Gaming World in October 1993 called the game's plot "gripping" and "intriguing". While criticizing the slow movement speed and lack of keyboard shortcuts, and the game "offering only 12 to 18 hours of gaming for the average player" given the US$69.95 (equivalent to $155.9 in 2025) price, it praised the rotoscoped animation—"as fluid and lifelike as that of any computer product to date"—and "rich and full" music. The magazine concluded that Phantom was best suited for those who preferred story over puzzles, especially at a lower price. It criticized the CD-ROM version as "a disappointment" for "unspiring vocals and slow [CD] access". In April 1994 the magazine said that the CD version "needed more rehearsals prior to release". While preferable to the floppy version "the vocal talent leaves much to be desired", and with no added lip movement animation the game resembled "a poorly subtitled foreign film". Power Unlimited gave the game a score of 70% writing: "Return of the Phantom is a great adventure for beginners. It also looks good, so it can easily keep your attention. It is a pity that the story and the sound are not much."
