= Windsloe Mansion =

1982 video game

- Developer(s): SoftSide Publications
- Publisher(s): SoftSide Publications
- Series: Adventure of the Month
- Platform(s): Apple II, Atari 8-bit, TRS-80
- Release: January 1982

Windsloe Mansion is a text adventure published by Adventure of the Month Club for the Apple II, Atari 8-bit computers, and TRS-80. It was the January 1982 Adventure of the Month.

== Contents ==
Windsloe Mansion is a text adventure in which the player needs to rescue the Pumpkin Man from the haunted house where he is being held captive.

== Reception ==
Bruce Campbell reviewed Windsloe Mansion in The Space Gamer No. 61. Campbell commented that "Windsloe Mansion is a loser."
