= Klondike Adventure =

1982 video game

- Game of the Month ad
- Publisher: Softside Publications
- Designer: James Bash
- Series: Adventure of the Month
- Platform: Atari 8-bit
- Release: February 1982

Klondike Adventure is a video game published in 1982 by SoftSide for the Atari 8-bit computers. It was the February 1982 Adventure of the Month, and the ninth in the series.

== Contents ==
Klondike Adventure is a text-based adventure game in which the player must recover five missing treasures from the arctic.

== Reception ==
Bruce Campbell reviewed Klondike Adventure in The Space Gamer No. 61. Campbell commented that "I enjoyed the unique setting as well as the puzzles presented by Klondike. [...] For a relatively simple adventure, Klondike is a good buy. If you get stuck, try yelling."
