= Carcassonne (video game) =

2007 turn-based strategy video game

- Developer: Sierra Online Seattle
- Publisher: Vivendi Games (Note: Released under the Sierra Online brand name)
- Platform: Xbox 360
- Release: June 27, 2007
- Genre: Turn-based strategy
- Modes: Single-player, multiplayer

Carcassonne is a 2007 turn-based strategy video game based on the board game of the same name. It was designed by Klaus-Jürgen Wrede for the Xbox 360, published by Vivendi Games under their Sierra Online subsidiary, and developed by Sierra Online Seattle, formally known as Secret Lair Studios. The Xbox 360 game was released on June 27, 2007, and is the second designer board game to be released on Xbox Live Arcade, the first being Catan.

== Features ==
Unlike Catan, whose initial implementation included only the base game, Carcassonne includes "The River" expansion (originally published as a separate board game add-on). An extra expansion based on "The River" is available for purchase and download from Xbox Live Arcade, as is the "King & Baron" expansion. According to Sierra Online, additional expansions based on those from the board game including "Inns & Cathedrals" and "The Tower", will be released through Xbox Live at a later point in time. Expansion modules can be enabled or disabled individually based on player preference. The Windows Phone version comes with the River II expansion.

Both online and offline multiplayer modes are supported; while four people can compete against each other offline on the same console, up to five can play via Xbox Live. However, in ranked matches, play is restricted to two players. On the Windows Phone version, up six players can play at a time in either pass-n-play offline or online.

The game also features customizable AI settings and several step-by-step tutorials. The tutorials explain how to play and how the game is normally scored, although the scoring rules can be tweaked when setting up a custom non-ranked game.

Lastly, the title supports the Xbox Live Vision camera, allowing players to view each other during play.

== Gameplay ==
Gameplay mirrors that of the actual board game. Each player is granted seven followers (colloquially called meeples, a portmanteau of either "my" or "miniature" and "people"), and each takes turns placing random land tiles, after the initial "starter tile" is placed, from a group of 71. An optional (30- or 45-second) per-turn timer can be enabled in multiplayer games to prevent extended analysis paralysis; there is no timer in single player games. Players can also customise scoring in casual games to follow the International rules (3rd Edition) or the US rules (1st Edition).

== Expansions ==
As with the board game, various expansions are available to change the gameplay and scoring. Any of the expansions can be used in any combination, together or separately.

=== The River ===
If The River expansion is used, a river is first built with 12 extra tiles before main gameplay begins. This serves to add some element of randomness to the board configuration before normal tiles are played. The river acts as a divider between two halves of the land (separating farms), but otherwise does not affect scoring. This expansion was included with the main game download.

=== The River II ===
On August 8, 2007, The River II expansion was released. This expansion adds additional river tile pieces, including a fork in the river. The Windows Phone version of the game includes the River II expansion at no additional charge.

=== King & Baron ===
On October 3, 2007, the King & Baron expansion pack was released, based on the King & Scout board game expansion. In this expansion, the player who builds the biggest city becomes King of Carcassonne, and at the end of the game receives extra points for every completed city; likewise, the player who builds the biggest road becomes Robber Baron and receives points for every completed road. It also adds 7 new tiles, including a special tile that bridges two cities over one another.

== Other downloadable content ==
The first downloadable content for Carcassonne was a picture pack released on July 16, 2007, named simply "Carcassonne Picture Pack #1". This was followed by a dashboard theme, "Carcassonne Theme #1", on July 31, 2007. Both were priced at the standard rates for these items.

== Reception ==
Reception

Aggregate score
| Aggregator | Score |
|---|---|
| Metacritic | 79/100 |

Reviews of Carcassonne concluded that it was indeed a faithful adaptation of a well-respected board game. IGN, awarding it a review score of 8.0 out of 10, summarized this as "The question was whether or not an Xbox Live Arcade version would retain what made the real-world game fun, and the answer is 'indeed.'" GameSpot echoed this sentiment, noting "All things considered, Carcassonne is a solid addition to Live Arcade's slowly increasing library of board games." While the GameSpot review did point out a few difficulties with the automatic camera zooming, the title earned a score of 7.5 out of 10.

== See also ==
- Lost Cities (video game)
- Ticket to Ride (video game)
- Catan (video game)
