= Recettear: An Item Shop's Tale =

2007 video game

Recettear: An Item Shop’s Tale
- Japanese cover art
- Developer: EasyGameStation
- Publisher: Carpe Fulgur
- Platform: Microsoft Windows
- Release: JP: December 2007; WW: September 10, 2010
- Genres: Action role-playing, business simulation
- Mode: Single-player

Recettear: An Item Shop’s Tale (ルセッティアRECETTEAR〜アイテム屋さんのはじめ方〜, Rusettia – Aitemu-ya-san no Hajimekata; Recettear: How to Start an Item Shop) is a role-playing game developed by Japanese dōjin maker EasyGameStation for the Windows operating system. The game follows a young girl named Recette, who is charged by the fairy Tear to run an item shop out of her house to pay off the considerable debt her father had accumulated before his mysterious disappearance; the eponymous shop is a portmanteau of the lead characters' names. In the game, the player controls Recette in several areas of gameplay, including bargaining and haggling with clients for goods, and accompanying an adventurer into randomly generated dungeons to acquire goods to sell, with the goal of paying back the debt within a fixed deadline.

The game, first released in 2007 at the 73rd Comiket in Japan, has been localized into English by indie localization company Carpe Fulgur and was released internationally on September 10, 2010 exclusively via digital distribution platforms. Recettear is the first independently made Japanese game to be distributed through Steam. Though Carpe Fulgur only expected about 10,000 sales of the title in Western markets, the game was warmly received by critics and its reputation spread through word-of-mouth, leading to over 300,000 sales by September 2013. The game had sold over 500,000 units on Steam as of July 2017. Recettear's success allowed Carpe Fulgur to look towards other dōjin titles to localize, as well as helped pave the way for more dōjin games to reach international markets. A remaster of the game is set for Japanese release in 2025.

== Gameplay ==
The overhead view of the shop in Recettear, where various display tables hold items that the player can attempt to sell to the store's customers.

Recette and Tear join one of the adventurers as they explore a random dungeon level and collect goods to sell back at the shop.

Recettear takes place in a fantasy setting, and places the player in the role of Recette Lemongrass, the daughter of a shopkeeper who has left to be an adventurer but has mysteriously disappeared. As her father was in great debt to Terme Finance, she is forced by Terme's representative fairy, Tear, to rebuild her home into an item shop to repay the debt. Recette reopens the shop as Recettear, a portmanteau of hers and Tear's names. Recette adopts the catchphrase "Capitalism, ho!" as the player continues on with the story. The game's story is presented through text dialogue and two-dimensional sprites, akin to a visual novel. There are some occasional spoken lines in Japanese, which remain untranslated in the English version.

The game is structured on daily cycle, with the goal to have repaid the debt of 820,000 pix (the game's currency) by the end of one month. Each day is structured into fixed periods. Time passes when the player operates the shop, goes adventuring for items, or returns to the shop after visiting other shops or guilds in the town, limiting the total number of activities that can be done in a day.

When the player chooses to operate the shop, they can place items on the shop's shelves, with certain spots, such as near the storefront window, being more lucrative to draw in buyers. When a potential buyer selects an item, the player can bargain to try to get as much profit from the sale as possible, but ineffectively bargaining will cause the buyer to leave without purchasing anything. Successful bargains earn points towards the player's merchant level, allowing for improvement of the shop and selling benefits once higher levels are gained. Customers may also bring goods to sell to Recette, requiring the player to try to barter and buy the item well below cost.

When adventuring, the player recruits a member of the local adventure guild. The player has access to only one adventurer at the start of the game, but as the game progresses, new guild members with various skills and abilities can be accessed. Through Tear's magic, Recette is invulnerable in the dungeon but cannot interact with the creatures within it, and instead watches over the adventurer, helping to collect items dropped by creatures or supplying healing items. The player has a limited amount of storage they can carry from the dungeon, and if the adventurer falls and cannot be healed, the player must drop most of their inventory to allow Recette to carry the adventurer out of the dungeon. Each dungeon features a number of randomly generated dungeon levels, along with a final treasure room at a specific depth. Items found in dungeons can be used as equipment for the adventurer, sold at the shop, or combined with other items to make more useful and valuable goods. The adventurer gains experience points and gains levels as he or she kills monsters, making the character more effective in deeper dungeons.

Should the player miss the debt payment deadline, Recette is forced to sell the shop and live in a cardboard box; the player can choose to restart the game retaining their merchant level and items, but not pix amount. Successfully completing the game unlocks three further game modes: "New Game+" which restarts the game but allows the player to keep their items and merchant and adventure levels from the completed game, "Endless Mode" where the player can continue the game indefinitely without having to pay any debt, and "Survival Mode", where the player must try to complete ever-increasing debt payments on a weekly basis. Survival Mode offers two versions, Normal Survival, where the items and levels are retained week to week, and Survival Hell, where these do not carry onward.

== Development ==
Recettear was originally developed by the dōjin soft developer EasyGameStation and released only in Japan. The game was localized to Western audiences by Carpe Fulgur, a two-man studio consisting of Andrew Dice and Robin Light-Williams. Dice saw the growing dōjin market in Japan as an opportunity to bring more unique experiences to the Western gaming market.

After forming Carpe Fulgur, Dice and Light-Williams considered approaching Gust Corporation, offering their services to translate games from the Atelier series, but ultimately decided against the idea. Light-Williams suggested the idea of approaching dōjin soft developers, as while titles from major Japanese developers have often been localized in English, there had been no effort for doing the same with the dōjin market. Williams specifically suggested Recettear, which had favorable word-of-mouth in Japan, and whose developers, EasyGameStation, were eager to open the game to the Western market. Though there was some trepidation due to the distance between countries and between Dice and Light-Williams (who, at the time, lived on opposite sides of the United States), EasyGameStation agreed to work with Carpe Fulgur for the translation. The game's composers, Team m_box, who were behind multiple other EasyGameStation works, provided a new mix of the title theme for the translation, as the Japanese version initially only had a one-instrument track Dice found "frankly rather weak".

Carpe Fulgur took the opportunity to establish a unique style for their localization efforts. They modified the original Japanese script to replace some of the unique aspects of Japanese to ones that made more sense in Western regions. For example, as the game is set in a seemingly European village, the original script's mention of rice and tofu felt out of place, and Carpe Fulgur replaced these with more appropriate foods. They also modified Recette's repetitive use of the word "yatta", a Japanese expression similar to "yay" in English, with variations on the word "yay", like "Yayifications!", or other made-up affirmations, such as "Yepperoni!". While certain references to other areas of Japanese culture, such as doors referencing Doraemon and puns related to sailors, had been slightly altered, Dice states that Carpe Fulgur attempted to make sure that nothing was lost in translation. Much of the time in translation was taken by the item list, and specifically the addition of plural nouns which do not exist in the Japanese language. Dice was initially worried that some changes to the general script necessitated by localization would be criticized, but found after release that their resulting script was well received. Dice admits that they did not fully explain the keyboard control well enough (such as the "Z" key being the default action key for most dōjin soft games but uncommon in Western titles), and believes that some players were lost because of this.

Dice estimated the cost of the translation to be less than $10,000, believing that it would be easy to recoup the funds through the game's sales. Dice recognized that this would be best realized through digital distribution, as the cost of publishing the game for the retail market would be insurmountable. Though Dice had expected the translation effort to take about four months, other obligations arose, extending the time to about eight months. Dice also attributed the time extension to the telecommuting with Light-Williams. They also encountered some difficulties in getting distribution agreements for the game. Ultimately, Recettear was released on several digital distribution channels including Impulse and Gamers Gate; its release on Steam was the first Japanese indie game sold on the service. Carpe Fulgur expected only to sell about ten thousand units within six months, considering that they were a new company bringing a Japanese game to what they believed to be a niche market for Western countries. They also were aware of high rates of digital piracy of such games in the West, and had considered that they would experience an equally high piracy rate (95-98%) with Recettear. With these conditions, the 10,000 number would have justified Carpe Fulgur to continue to bring over other Japanese games at part-time. Dice was also aware of a large number of players that would immediately identify the game as Japanese and would refuse to play it, and considered this in their initial sales estimates.

Actual sales of the game far exceeded their expectations. Within a month of accepting pre-orders for the game, Carpe Fulgur reported sales of 26,000 copies, fully justifying future efforts for localizing more dōjin games. The game was included in the late 2010 sales on Steam, had sold more than 100,000 copies at the time;. As of 2013, it had sold over 300,000 copies. According to Dice, Recettear joins only a handful of other Japanese game franchises to have done this well in Western markets on their debut within the last ten years. Dice attributes the game's success to two factors: the first factor being the creation of a fully playable game demo, giving players a sampling of the complete game. Their motivation for creating the demo followed from Epic MegaGames and id Software in the early 1990s, who would provide a small episodic section of the full game within the free demo. Through Steam, 40% of the players that tried the demo went on to purchase the full game, a number considered "ridiculous" by Dice who claims most demos only convert roughly 10% of the players to the full game. The second factor in Recettear's success being viral-like word-of-mouth for the game. While Dice and Light-Williams had promoted the game in selected online forums, they recognized that the spread of reviews for the game on other forums drew in large numbers of players.

With strong sales from Recettear, both Dice and Light-Williams were able to commit to Carpe Fulgur full-time. The revenue from the game allowed them the opportunity to participate in more industry events, possibly expand to other systems besides Windows, and port other titles based on newfound interest in other Japanese developers. Dice claims they only need to bring over a few games that do not need to be as successful as Recettear to continue localization through 2012. EasyGameStation, who receive a majority share of all sales of the game, have been "thrilled with the way things are going", according to Dice, and worked with Carpe Fulgur to help bring an older EasyGameStation title, Chantelise, to American and European digital platforms.

An HD remaster of the game was announced to release in Japan in 2025.

== Reception ==
Reception

Aggregate scores
Aggregator	Score
GameRankings	83.70/100
Metacritic	82/100

Review scores
Publication	Score
Eurogamer	9/10
IGN	7.5/10.0
PC Gamer (US)	76/100

Recettear's Western release was well received by critics who considered the game a surprise title. The Metro acknowledged that while the idea of a game around running a shop would be the "dullest activity possible", Recettear's shopkeeping is a "strangely fulfilling activity", with some deep gameplay aspects that are not apparent on an initial play. Quintin Smith of Eurogamer considered the shopkeeping activity rather addictive, similar to "a tiny gambling session, where a confluence of factors can result in you having the best or worst day ever", leading the player to play "just one more [turn]". Richard Cobbett of PC Gamer noted that "while you do spend most of it doing the exact same simple things, doing so quickly becomes a frothy, capitalistic bubblewrap". IGN's Charles Onyett noted that, once the player has learned the habits of various characters, the price haggling "degenerates into a thoughtless, mechanical exercise", but random fluctuations in the market such as the result of news events or trending items helps to keep the shopkeeping interesting.

Reviewers had mixed opinions on the dungeon exploration aspects. Smith praised the exploration, considering it "more competent than any number of games [he] could mention", citing the control of the adventure character and the unique attack patterns of the enemies. Others found the dungeon crawling somewhat repetitive and made more difficult by the randomness of the dungeon creation. Onyett stated that "the combat can become wearyingly repetitive in later stages" with larger dungeons, but that it suited the purposes of Recettear appropriately. Sam Marchello of RPGamer found that she would have often arrive on a new dungeon floor near a trap, allowing enemies to swarm her characters without much chance to respond, and believes that "players may find themselves reloading save files simply to get themselves into a better position".

The English translation by Carpe Fulgur was universally praised. Onyett called the translation "very well done", with "the tone is bubbly and frequently funny in an internet message board kind of way", and ties in the various gameplay elements well. Smith called Carpe Fulgur's translation "a fantastic job", helping to craft the world and characters to a point where he cared enough for certain characters to want to undercharge them for sales despite the game's premise. The Metro's review stated "the translation is superb and almost the equal of genres bests such as Disgaea and Paper Mario".

At the 2011 Independent Games Festival, Recettear was given two honorable mentions for the Seumas McNally Grand Prize and Excellence in Design categories.
