= Dragonsphere =

1994 video game

- Developer(s): MPS Labs
- Publisher(s): MicroProse
- Director(s): Douglas Kaufman
- Producer(s): Matt Gruson
- Programmer(s): Paul Lahaise
- Artist(s): Michael Gibson; Charles Shenton
- Writer(s): Douglas Kaufman
- Composer(s): Michael Bross
- Platform(s): MS-DOS
- Release: NA: 7 January 1994; EU: 1994
- Genre(s): Point-and-click adventure
- Mode(s): Single-player

Dragonsphere is a point-and-click graphic adventure game developed and published by MicroProse in 1994. It has graphics which were considered high-quality at the time it was published, considered a novelty. It is still a cult classic for many.

The game was the third, and last, graphical adventure game developed by MicroProse, following Rex Nebular and Return of the Phantom. It was designed by Douglas Kaufman and developed using the MicroProse Adventure Development system with 256-color graphics.

== Plot ==
The story is set in a fantasy world and revolves around a magical sphere in which Sanwe, an evil sorcerer, was trapped by the late King of Gran Callahach 20 years ago. Sanwe is now on the verge of breaking free.

The newly crowned king, Callash, goes on a quest to stop the wizard before he regains his powers. However, when he faces Sanwe, he discovers that he is not the real king but a shapechanger named Pid Shuffle. It is revealed that the Queen Mother concocted the scheme to get rid of Callash and put his evil brother MacMorn on the throne, persuading the Court Wizard to aid her under the false pretense of saving Callash from mortal danger. It falls to Pid to rescue the rightful King and defeat MacMorn.

== Reception ==
Pelit gave the game 92 out of 100 and summarized that Dragonsphere is "a really enjoyable and atmospheric adventure which holds the player's attention until the end." Computer Gaming World rated the game four stars out of five, praising its "true-to-life" animation. Although stating that experienced players might find the game too easy or short, the magazine concluded that Dragonsphere's puzzles and story made it "an enjoyable and satisfying piece of work". Computer Gaming World nominated Dragonsphere as its 1994 "Adventure of the Year", although it lost to Relentless: Twinsen's Adventure. The editors praised Dragonsphere for incorporating "an intriguing storyline, imaginative fantasy cultures, and a wonderful conversation system".

James V. Trunzo reviewed Dragonsphere in White Wolf #46 (Aug., 1994), giving it a final evaluation of "Excellent" and stated that "This game [...] earns high marks for graphics, animation and sound. The truth is that no product can be successful without these qualities. With the high cost of software and consumer awareness of visual and audio standards, manufacturers simply can't get by without state-of-the-art presentation."

== Legacy ==
In 1994, Sanctuary Woods purchased the MicroProse Adventure Development System game engine.

In 2011, GOG.com released the game for free. It was released on Steam in 2014. Tommo purchased the rights to this game and digitally published it in 2015, through its Retroism brand.
