= DomiNations =

2015 video game

- DomiNations Logo
- Developers: Nexon; Big Huge Games
- Publishers: Nexon (2015-2019); Big Huge Games (2020-present)
- Platforms: Android iOS iPadOS
- Release: April 1, 2015
- Genre: Strategy
- Mode: Massively multiplayer online game

DomiNations is a 2015 freemium mobile massively multiplayer strategy video game developed and published by Big Huge Games. The game was released on April 1, 2015.

== Gameplay ==
A home base in DomiNations. The player is playing as Koreans and is in Enlightenment Age

DomiNations is a massively multiplayer online game. Players build a base with Defensive, Economy, and Army. An example of a military building is the Barracks along with several wonders of the world and a town centre. After training appropriate troops, players search for suitable opponents to attack and gain loot and medals.

Players can choose to play as any of the 8 different nations - British, Chinese, French, German, Greek, Japanese, Korean or Roman; and advance through 16 ages from Dawn Age to Automation Age, expanding the base in each age.

There is also a single player campaign where players practice strategies by battling in a historical perspective. DomiNations introduced World War on December 2, 2015.

== Reception ==
As of April 2017, the game has over 32 million players worldwide, including 25 million players in the Western world, and it has grossed over $100 million in lifetime revenue.

Reviewers have compared the game with Clash of Clans, and the reviewers generally do not regard the two games being too similar. As of March 2016, the game had been downloaded over 19 million times.

During the 19th Annual D.I.C.E. Awards, the Academy of Interactive Arts & Sciences nominated DomiNations for "Mobile Game of the Year".
