= SoftSide =

Computer magazine (1978–1984)

- Volume 5, No. 9 cover
- Creator/Publisher: Roger Robitaille
- Categories: Computer programming
- Frequency: Monthly
- First issue: October 1978
- Final issue: March 1984
- Company: SoftSide Publications
- Country: United States
- Based in: Milford, New Hampshire
- Language: English
- ISSN: 0274-8630
- OCLC: 6656512

SoftSide is a defunct computer magazine, begun in October 1978 by Roger Robitaille and published by SoftSide Publications of Milford, New Hampshire.

== History ==
Dedicated to personal computer programming, SoftSide was a unique publication with articles and line-by-line program listings that users manually keyed in. The TRS-80 edition was first, launched in 1978. An Apple II specific version began in January 1980, followed by more individual versions supporting the Atari 8-bit computers and IBM PC, as well as one for BASIC language programmers, Prog80. The platform-specific versions were combined into a single monthly edition in August 1980.

The Best of SoftSide, 1983

In the first few years of publication, users often had problems with the legibility of the dot-matrix program listings. By the time the printout was photographed and printed in the magazine, it had become a bit illegible. One reader commented, "after a short while of typing, you felt like you needed some of the 'coke bottle bottom' eye glasses!" Subscriptions were offered that included the printed magazine and a cassette tape, and later 5¼-inch floppy disks, to be literally "played" into the input port to load the complete program into the subscriber's personal computer.

Like many computer publications of the time, SoftSide faced considerable financial pressure and competition in an industry-wide shakeout of personal computer publications in 1983. As a result, Robitaille reorganized the publication into two new magazines: SoftSide 2.0 (directed towards the computer user) and Code (for the programmer), each with its own disk-based featured software included. Neither magazine found sufficient market to become fully established, and SoftSide ended with its March 1984 issue.

Early on, in 1978 or 1979, SoftSide was joined by a sister company called TRS-80 Software Exchange (or TSE), a software publisher. Many titles sold by this company were magazine submissions that were either very high quality or written in languages that the magazine did not support (which was mainly various dialects of BASIC). Due to a copyright challenge by Tandy, owner of the TRS-80, the business name was changed to The Software Exchange or just TSE. By mid-1979, hardware systems and peripherals of the day could be ordered via mail order/phone order from the newest branch of the business, named HardSide.

It is notable that this magazine launched the careers of many programmers, many of whom are still active in the profession. It also provided experience and support for several entrepreneurs who went on to create companies including MicroMint, The Bottom Line, Campbell Communications, The Gollan Letter.

Scott Adams took out the first ad for a commercial software game (Adventureland) in Softside Magazine in 1978.

== Software ==
SoftSide published numerous computer games and utilities for the TRS-80, Apple II, Atari 8-bit, and Commodore PET over its six-year history. The following titles were collected in the Apple edition of The Best of SoftSide (1983) and released on accompanying 5¼-inch floppy disks.

- Android Nim by Leo Christopherson (TRS-80 version) and Don Dennis (Commodore PET version)
- Arena of Octos by Steve D. Kropinak (Apple version) and Al Johnston (TRS-80 version)
- Battlefield by Joe Humphrey
- Database by Mark Pelczarski
- Escape from the Dungeons of the Gods by Ray Sato (Apple version by Alex Lee)
- Flight of the Bumblebee by William Morris and John Cope
- Galaxia by Michael Prescott
- Gambler by Randy Hawkins (Apple version by Rich Bouchard)
- Leyte by Victor A. Vernon, Jr.
- Magical Shape Machine by Tom Keith
- Melody Dice by Gary Cage
- Microtext 1.2 by Jon R. Voskuil
- Minigolf by Mitch Voth (Apple version by Steve Justus)
- Operation Sabotage by Ray Sato (Apple version by Ron Shaker)
- Quest 1 by Brian Reynolds (Apple version by Rich Bouchard)
- Solitaire by Larry Williams
- Space Rescue by Matt Rutter
- SWAT by Jon R. Voskuil
- Titan by William Morris and John Cope
- Word Search Puzzle Generator by David W. Durkee

=== Adventure of the Month Club ===
1. Arabian Adventure (June 1981)
2. Alien Adventure (July 1981)
3. Treasure Island Adventure (August 1981)
4. Jack The Ripper Adventure (September 1981)
5. Crime Adventure (October 1981)
6. Around the World in Eighty Days (November 1981)
7. Black Hole Adventure (December 1981)
8. Windsloe Mansion Adventure (January 1982)
9. Klondike Adventure (February 1982)
10. James Brand Adventure (March 1982)
11. Witches Brew Adventure (April 1982)
12. Titanic Adventure (May 1982)
13. Arrow One (June 1982)
14. Robin Hood (July 1982)
15. The Mouse That Ate Chicago (August 1982)
16. Menagerie (September 1982)
17. The Deadly Game (October 1982)
18. The Dalton Gang (November 1982)
19. Alaskan Adventure (December 1982)
20. Danger is My Business (January 1983)

== Reception ==
Bruce Campbell reviewed SoftSide in 1982 in The Space Gamer No. 61. Campbell commented that "SoftSide has evolved from a pulp tabloid to a slick, professional magazine. A wide variety of programs are featured: arcade games, adventures, economic situations, board games, educational programs, and more. In general, I have found these of higher quality than most listings in books and magazines."
