= The Pioneer Trail =

2010 video game

- Developer: Zynga East
- Publisher: Zynga
- Platform: Facebook
- Release: June 9, 2010
- Genres: Simulation, RPG
- Mode: Single-player with multiplayer interaction

The Pioneer Trail, formerly known as FrontierVille is a defunct simulation, role-playing video game available for play on social networking sites such as Facebook. Developed by Zynga, and launched on June 9, 2010, it was a freemium game (i.e. free to play, but with the option of purchasing premium content). The game was shut down on April 30, 2015.

FrontierVille was the first game developed at Zynga East, Zynga's Baltimore studio led by Brian Reynolds. Reynolds was deeply involved in the project and has been credited as its lead designer.

The game reached 20 million monthly active users and 6 million daily active users within five weeks of launch. During the 14th Annual Interactive Achievement Awards, the Academy of Interactive Arts & Sciences nominated FrontierVille for "Social Networking Game of the Year".

== Gameplay ==
In art treatment and gameplay, The Pioneer Trail was very similar to one of Zynga's most popular games, FarmVille. Instead of a farm, however, the player played the role of a pioneer in the "American Old West."

The player created an avatar which resembled an American pioneer. The player then may have completed a total of innumerable collections which could be traded for coins, "experience points" (XP), decorations, livestock, trees, craftable items, energy and horseshoes (rare money that can be bought with real money). The player could also finish goals which included tasks such as gathering money, buying energy, clearing land, chopping down trees, raising livestock and trees, creating items such as beds, furniture, and clobbering unwanted pests such as bears, snakes, foxes and/or groundhogs. Eventually, the player would have acquired a spouse and up to four children. The player could have the other family members perform tasks. They could perform tasks simultaneously with their spouses and children, but the player risked being "kicked off" the game.

Other tasks included collecting from buildings, building inns, wagons, general stores, log cabin, schools, chicken coops, barns, trading posts, barber shops, churches, and sawmills as well as seeding, growing and harvesting crops. Completing goals yielded rewards for the player. One early source of game points, which was changed by Zynga, was for the player to build as many chicken coops as possible. One noted player managed to build 28 upgraded chicken coops. The chickens became ready to feed every 30 minutes, but the chicken coops could only allow the stored chickens to be fed only once in a 24-hour period. Having more than 24 allowed the player to feed all of their chickens for free every 30 minutes, which gave the player added coins, collection items and game points. Feeding coops as often as possible did elevate the player's game level in a shorter time. Sometimes, players could set their own goals, such as surpassing a billion coins, or saving over a million food points, or growing over 1300 horses on their land. One player of note, had passed over 1.2 billion coins, 13 million food points and over 1300 grown horses on his land, when the game was removed by Zynga. Horses were fed for free and gave between zero points to four points of energy. The upgraded barn could hold 1000 cows of various types, 1000 horses, and 1000 mules.

Coins enabled the player to purchase decorations, buildings, crops, trees and animals. Horseshoes, which could be earned during the playing of the game, or purchased through real-world credit cards, enabled the player to buy mules, horses, paint buckets, hand drills, nails, bricks, hammers and other assorted crops or items. These items were essential for completing certain goals. Friends could also send these items as gifts to the player.

Crops could also be planted and had to be harvested before they withered. As in FarmVille, the withering time of a particular crop was twice the maturation time. Also, as in FarmVille, crop maturity varied from five minutes for clover, to four days for peanuts. Crops with longer maturation times provided larger payoffs. Harvesting could trigger encounters with groundhogs, which needed to be clobbered to avoid using extra energy within their area of influence. Clobbering or scaring off pests and harvesting crops yielded coins, XP and food. Food was used to get energy, which was necessary to do any action in the game except for planting crops. Energy could be purchased in exchange for food or horseshoes. Every five minutes the player gained one energy unless the player had surpassed their energy limit. When a player ran out of energy, they could either purchase more energy with food or horseshoes, wait for their energy to build up, or feed their horses again if they possessed the right collection. They could also gain energy by visiting their neighbor's farms and performing up to five tasks daily on each neighbor's homestead.

Animals could be purchased, gifted, or gained through specific collections and fed routinely for resources, or sold outright for a large one-time reward. They started out as juvenile animals and, except for race horses, needed to be fed several times (which were set by the game's rules) to grow into adults. There were two main types of animals. Mammals included goats, sheep, pigs, cows, oxen, mules and horses and birds such as chickens and geese. Mammals took somewhat longer to grow to adulthood and produce resources but generally provided a larger payoff. Birds took less time to grow and produce resources, but there was a chance of triggering a fox encounter when they were fed. Unless the fox was clobbered, all birds within its area of influence (as seen with a red aura) could only be sold (i.e. hunted), not harvested.

Players could also plant fruit trees. Cherry, apple, pear, peach, and apricot trees were available. They were bought as seedlings and needed to be watered in a specific time period (in a manner similar to feeding the animals) to reach their full growth. They provided somewhat fewer resources than crops and animals did, but they never withered or were at risk for triggering the appearance of a pest.

Reaching a higher experience level or leveling up, rewarded the player with full energy, more coins, or sometimes advanced the limit of a player's maximum energy. Leveling up occurred by accumulating experience points (XP). Experience points were earned by doing most actions in the game.

Initially, oak trees, pine trees, grass, cacti, wildflowers, rocks, and cow skulls filled the player's homestead. At least some needed to be cleared to obtain usable land. Chopping down trees yielded one to three wood, which was needed to construct buildings. Chopping down trees often triggered a bear encounter. Bears, while harmless (as there was no real danger in the game), prevented the player from doing some things. They were removed by scaring them off, which expended energy, but yielded rewards such as coins, food, xp, etc.). Clearing land could also trigger a snake encounter, which was handled in the same manner as a groundhog encounter.

Collections were an intrinsic feature of the game. Collection items were found or given by the game while doing most actions in the game (feeding animals, harvesting crops, or clobbering pests). Collection items were automatically added to collection sets. When a set was complete, it could be redeemed for in-game rewards, such as food, energy, XP, etc. The player could request collection items and could receive them as gifts via neighbors or Facebook friends who were playing the game).

Most, if not all, players' homesteads contained, at one time or another, one glitch or another. Sometimes, certain items such as trees or animals would disappear. As the game progressed, real help was available to players with problems from real Zynga personnel but this asset was disbanded when perhaps the costs of time and salaries exceeded the need to help players with glitches in the game.

=== Pioneer Trail ===
This expansion was rolled out in August 2011. The gameplay flows in the same vein as the 80s educational game, The Oregon Trail. Players followed a story line of a rescue mission.
