= Big Huge Games =

American video game developer

Big Huge Games, Inc.
- Type: Subsidiary
- Industry: Video games
- Founded: February 2000; 26 years ago (Note: After a brief dormant period following the bankruptcy of its parent in 2012, Big Huge Games was revived in early 2013 by two of its original founders and other alumni, initially as SecretNewCo., and funded by Nexon, with the Big Huge Games brand recovered and used since late 2013.)
- Headquarters: Timonium, Maryland, United States
- Key people: Brian Reynolds; Tim Train; David Inscore; Jason Coleman; Vinh Trinh; Bryant Freitag; Dan Halka; Ken Rolston; Grant Kirkhope
- Products: Rise of Nations series Catan Live; Age of Empires III: The Asian Dynasties; Kingdoms of Amalur: Reckoning; DomiNations; Arcane Showdown
- Parent: THQ (2008–2009); 38 Studios (2009–2012); Nexon (2016–2025); Long Tail Games (2026-Present)
- Website: bighugegames.com

Big Huge Games, Inc. is an American video game developer based in Timonium, Maryland since 2000, known first for real-time strategy games such as Rise of Nations, later for the console RPG Kingdoms of Amalur: Reckoning, and more recently for mobile games such as DomiNations and Arcane Showdown. Throughout most of its history the company has been associated with its best-known founder, Brian Reynolds, whose prior career already included work as lead designer of Civilization II and Alpha Centauri, and co-founder of Firaxis Games. The studio's ownership has changed hands several times over the years, and it became briefly defunct in May 2012, but it was revived by Reynolds along with several original alumni and new partners. The company is presently owned by Nexon, and actively runs its mobile titles DomiNations (released April 2015) and Arcane Showdown (released June 2020), while continuing to develop new games.

== History ==
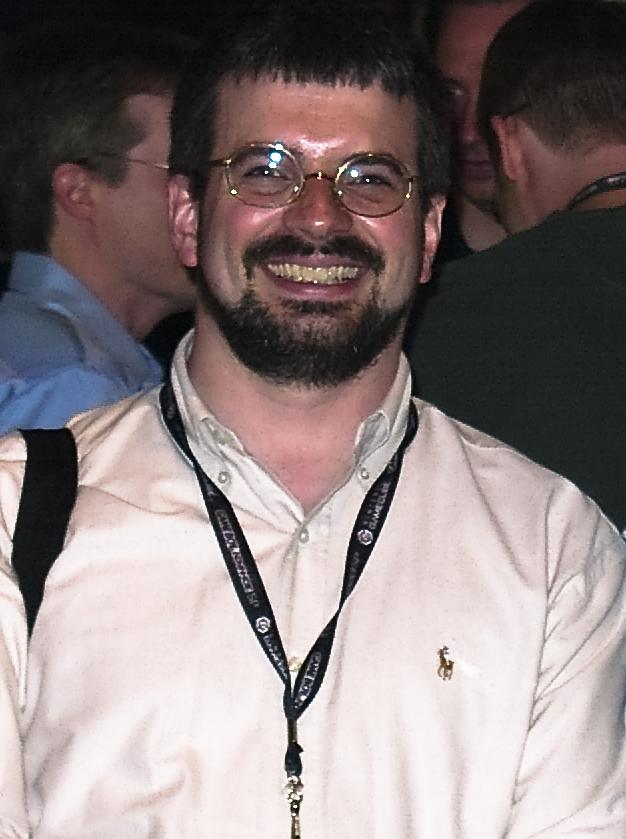
Reynolds at E3 in 2003

The company was incorporated in December 1999 and was first announced in February 2000 by Brian Reynolds along with partners Tim Train, David Inscore, and Jason Coleman. Among the founders, Reynolds principally specialized in game design, Train in production, Inscore in art direction, and Coleman in engineering. Although Brian Reynolds was also a founding member of Firaxis Games, he and the others left Firaxis to found the new company based on their desire to apply the complexity and concepts of the turn-based strategy genre to the real-time strategy genre.

The company's first game, a real-time strategy game entitled Rise of Nations released in 2003 and became a critical and commercial hit ultimately achieving over 2,000,000 lifetime sales. It received considerable critical acclaim and won awards including GameSpy's 2003 Game of the Year for PC-RTS and GameSpot's 2003 Best Strategy Game and 2003 Best PC. An expansion pack, Rise of Nations: Thrones and Patriots followed in 2004, along with a "Gold Edition".

Rise of Nations: Rise of Legends, a second real-time strategy game—this time fantasy and steampunk based, followed in mid-2006. Although this game had a positive critical reception, its sales underperformed, and it became the last full PC RTS from Big Huge Games.

In the year following the release of Rise of Legends, Reynolds took on two smaller projects with parts of the team. The first, Catan Live, was an Xbox Live version of Klaus Teuber's famous The Settlers of Catan boardgame, with an AI and console interface co-designed by Teuber and Reynolds. The second, Age of Empires III: The Asian Dynasties was an expansion pack for Microsoft's famous real-time strategy game.

Meanwhile, for its next large project, Big Huge Games turned to roleplaying games and another famous videogame designer. In February 2007, the company announced that Ken Rolston, the lead designer of The Elder Scrolls IV: Oblivion and The Elder Scrolls III: Morrowind, had come out of retirement to join the company as lead designer on an untitled role playing game (RPG). Later that May it was announced that THQ would publish the title in 2009. This marked the first title from Big Huge Games that was not distributed by Microsoft.

=== Acquisition by THQ ===
On January 15, 2008, THQ acquired the developer.

On July 30, 2008, Grant Kirkhope joined the Big Huge Games team as an audio director. He had previously worked for Rare, composing for the Banjo-Kazooie and Perfect Dark games (among others).

On March 18, 2009, during the height of that year's Great Recession, THQ announced that due to declining economic conditions, it would close Big Huge Games unless an outside buyer could be found in the next 60 days. As fate would have it, a buyer was found and the studio remained open, while THQ itself went on to file for bankruptcy in December 2012.

=== Acquisition by 38 Studios ===
On May 27, 2009, 38 Studios announced that it was acquiring Big Huge Games and retaining 70 employees out of approximately 120 who were at THQ. Brian Reynolds left the studio for Zynga shortly afterwards.

From mid-2009 to January 2012, Big Huge Games developed a single player role playing game titled Kingdoms of Amalur: Reckoning, which was released in early February 2012 and published by Electronic Arts (EA) and 38 Studios for Xbox 360, PS3 and PC. The game is set in a fantasy world created with input from R A Salvatore and Todd McFarlane.

It was reported on May 24, 2012 that the studio and its parent company 38 Studios had laid off their entire staff.

=== Formation of Epic Baltimore ===
Briefly, it appeared that the remaining Big Huge Games development team had found backing to keep the studio, or some part of the studio, running. In June 2012, Epic Games announced the opening of a new studio in Baltimore called Epic Baltimore. The studio consisted of a significant portion of ex-Big Huge developers. The nascent studio was later renamed Impossible Studios, but the reboot effort was ultimately short-lived and Impossible Studios officially closed on February 8, 2013.

=== Revival by Reynolds and Train ===
In October 2013, it was revealed that Reynolds and Train had revived Big Huge Games, having reacquired the trademark at auction from the state of Rhode Island, which owned it following the bankruptcy of 38 Studios. This name was given to their new venture founded in 2013, which was formerly briefly known as SecretNewCo. In addition to Reynolds and Train, the new owners included Bryant Freitag and Dan Halka, both Big Huge Games alumni, and Vinh Trinh who had worked with Reynolds during his time as Chief Game Designer at Zynga, where Reynolds had spent much of the 2009–2013 years. More hires soon followed including many more alumni, and the new studio developed a mobile strategy game for tablets and smartphones called DomiNations, for release on iOS and Android. It is published by Nexon's mobile gaming group. and was released for Android and iOS in April 2015.

The game experienced major success; as of March 2016, it had been downloaded over 19 million times, and Big Huge Games actively continues to run the game and develop features for it as recently as summer 2020.

=== Acquisition by Nexon ===
In the wake of DomiNation's successful launch, Nexon announced on March 9, 2016 that it had acquired Big Huge Games; the studio would continue to produce new titles and maintain DomiNations.

Arcane Showdown, the next major game from the studio, was released in summer 2020 on mobile platforms and Steam. It was shut down on May 29, 2021.

== Game engine ==
Throughout its first decade, Big Huge Games made extensive use of its internally developed game engine, the Big Huge Engine, in both Rise of Nations and Catan. The engine features support for a variety of applications and technologies, including physics, artificial intelligence, animation, and others.

== Games developed ==
Release Date	Title	Genre	Notes
2003	Rise of Nations	Real-time strategy	
2004	Rise of Nations: Thrones and Patriots	Real-time strategy	Expansion pack
2006	Rise of Nations: Rise of Legends	Real-time strategy	
2007	Catan	Turn-based strategy	Xbox Live Arcade
2007	Age of Empires III: The Asian Dynasties	Real-time strategy	Expansion pack. Co-developed with Ensemble Studios
2012	Kingdoms of Amalur: Reckoning	Action role-playing game	Co-developed with 38 Studios
2015	DomiNations	Turn-based strategy	Co-developed with Nexon
2020	Arcane Showdown	Real-time strategy	

=== Unreleased ===
At the time of its move from THQ to 38 Studios, Big Huge Games was working on two large game projects, which were then canceled.

- Ascendant (Xbox 360, PlayStation 3, Microsoft Windows)
- God: The Game (Wii)
