= Rise of Nations: Thrones and Patriots =

2004 American strategy video game expansion

- Developers: Big Huge Games; Westlake Interactive (Mac); SkyBox Labs (Extended Edition)
- Publishers: Microsoft Game Studios; MacSoft (Mac)
- Designer: Brian Reynolds
- Series: Rise of Nations
- Platforms: Microsoft Windows, Mac OS X
- Release: NA: April 27, 2004; EU: May 21, 2004; Gold Edition: WW: October 28, 2004 (PC); WW: November 2004 (Mac); Extended Edition; June 12, 2014
- Genre: Real-time strategy
- Modes: Single-player, Multiplayer

Rise of Nations: Thrones and Patriots is the official expansion pack to the real-time strategy video game Rise of Nations. The game is the second in a series of Rise of Nations games by Big Huge Games. Thrones and Patriots had its premiere release for Microsoft Windows on April 27, 2004 in North America, and was later bundled up with Rise of Nations as the Gold Edition, which was released for Windows on October 28, 2004, and for Mac OS X in November 2004. Rise of Nations: Extended Edition was released on Steam on June 12, 2014 and includes both the original game and Thrones and Patriots with updated graphics and Steamworks integration for multiplayer.

Thrones and Patriots expanded on a variety of features in the original game, such as new monuments (called "Wonders"), nations, governments, and campaigns. Gameplay still remains similar to Rise of Nations, with its wide span of ages and players still manage and expand their nations at the macro and micro levels. However, Thrones and Patriots has campaigns which offer more turn-based strategy features than the original and the ability to make decisions outside of combat. Up to eight players can play in multiplayer matches, with artificial intelligence being able to fill slots at the server host's choice.

Tim Train, executive producer of Thrones and Patriots, stated that various features were added to the game in an attempt to balance gameplay, including the addition of armed caravans and merchants. IGN claimed that Thrones and Patriots is "a great game [which] gets better," in reference to its predecessor Rise of Nations and other critical reviews also praised many features of the game, though some noted deficiencies.

== Gameplay ==
The Korean War during the Cold War campaign

Within Rise of Nations: Thrones and Patriots players control various units during battles, including land, sea, and aerial units. Units used during gameplay include slingers, musketeers, tanks, large Persian war elephants, aircraft carriers, and nuclear missiles. Players progress in different ways in Thrones and Patriots by using various means including espionage, political strategy, technology races and population growth. The gameplay takes place from ancient history to modern times. Players are able to lead their nations at the macro and micro levels, and build their nation up and expand it throughout the game.

Thrones and Patriots added six new nations to the original Rise of Nations game. The 'New World' situation playable in the game was enhanced by the introduction of the European nation—the Dutch. Three North American nations were added, the Americans, referring to the ex-colonial civilization, and two Native American nations were added, which were the Lakota and the Iroquois. Two Asian nations, the Indians and the Persians, were introduced. New Wonders were made available for building, such as the Hanging Gardens of Babylon, the Forbidden City, and the Red Fort.

New features of the game were added to the new nations, for instance the Lakota, which is unable to build farms to generate food, instead receive a constant food supply for each of their citizens, scouts, and cavalry units. They can make buildings in any region that is not possessed by their enemy, can raze buildings quickly, receiving a full refund. Additionally, they receive resources when enemy resources are destroyed.

=== Campaigns ===
Rise of Nations: Thrones and Patriots added four new "Conquer the World" campaigns: Alexander the Great, Napoleon, the New World, and the Cold War. The Alexander the Great campaign allows the player to choose whether or not to raze or incorporate conquered territories. A player's decision to raze may cause the rest of the enemies to either fight harder, or question their casus belli and ally with you. The Napoleon campaign challenges the player to conquer Europe in a limited amount of time, with diplomacy, alliances, conquest, and bribing with land. Players must have intuitive leadership in this campaign because faulty decisions by the player can force themselves, that is to say, Napoleon, into exile. The New World campaign allows the player to choose either the Americans, a European power, or a Native American tribe. If the player chooses to lead the Americans, they must pay taxes to Great Britain, until they declare independence. The map of a battle incorporates the region's environment, for example large forests in the Pacific Northwest. The Cold War campaign allows the player to play as either United States or Soviet Union, It also introduces the ability to fire nuclear missiles in the main map and initiate espionage missions. Armies can also move anywhere in their nation's territory without using up a turn. Rise of Nations: Thrones and Patriots' campaigns now offer more turn-based strategy into the game rather than real-time strategy being the only gameplay aspect.

=== Governments ===
After constructing the Senate building, the player may choose a government "upgrade" of either a Despotism or a Republic, each giving the player a different permanent gameplay bonus. Each government has a different "Patriot", effectively a stronger version of the "General" unit with different bonuses, depending on which government is chosen. They are used during combat to assist players in battle. A player can only have one Patriot unit at a time. When a Patriot unit is killed, a new one is automatically created in the Senate afterwards.

After reaching the Gunpowder Age, the player may choose to upgrade to either a Monarchy or a Democracy, each with its own different permanent gameplay bonus, and then after reaching the Industrial Age, the player may upgrade again, to either Capitalism or Socialism. The previous gameplay bonuses remain, allowing players to select the most appropriate combination of benefits as the game evolves.

=== Multiplayer ===
Rise of Nations features a highly customizable multiplayer mode. Up to eight players can play in a game with a variety of modes to choose from, with AI filling spots at the server host's choice. GameSpy Technologies had hosted matchmaking and other servers for multiplayer games played online through their dedicated server until December 2012. A new feature that was introduced into the game was the ability to use homemade scripts in online play. The scripts are able to be made in the built in script editor, and came with a pre-made script that disallowed missile silos.

== Development ==
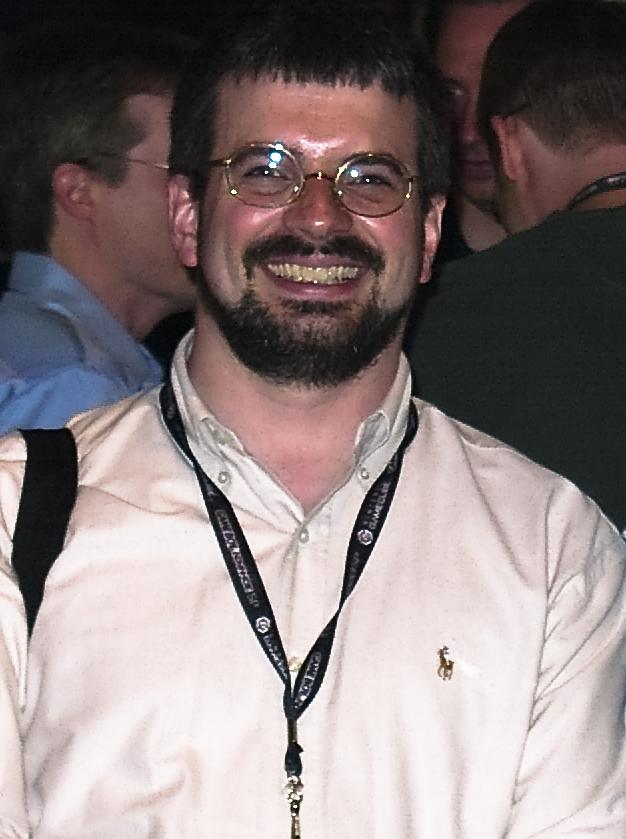
Brian Reynolds, designer of Thrones and Patriots

Microsoft Game Studios and Big Huge Games announced the development of the expansion pack for Rise of Nations, Rise of Nations: Thrones and Patriots, on November 21, 2003. By December 16 of that year, the game's development was about 70% complete. A website was launched for the game on February 13, 2004, which contained information, screenshots, and other details about the expansion pack.

Big Huge Games added multiple new features to the game during its development, in an attempt to fix issues with the original version. In an interview with GameSpot, executive producer Tim Train explained the development of the expansion pack. He stated how some nations were previously either too weak or too strong, and so features were added to balance gameplay. One way they did this is armed caravans and merchants were added to the Dutch nation, in order to weaken raids initiated by other players who rush their opponent. He said Big Huge Games brought in professional players in order to get suggestions on how to improve the game.

The expansion pack Thrones and Patriots was released for Microsoft Windows in North America on April 27, 2004, and subsequently in Europe on May 21, 2004. NPD sales figures for May, the first full month of Thrones and Patriots release in the United States, showed it as fourth in PC sales for the month, with its predecessor needed for the expansion pack going from twelfth in sales in April to fifth in sales in May. By October 27, 2004, combined sales of Thrones and Patriots and the base game Rise of Nations had passed one million copies worldwide. On October 28, 2004, Rise of Nations: Gold Edition was released for Microsoft Windows. The new product included both the original Rise of Nations and Thrones and Patriots. In November 2004, a port of Rise of Nations: Gold Edition was released for Mac OS X. It was published by MacSoft and developed by both Big Huge Games and Westlake Interactive.

In December 2012, official servers for Thrones and Patriots were shut down by GameSpy Technologies, which made it difficult for multiplayer matches to be played officially online. Programs like GameRanger could be used to continue playing multiplayer games online without the usage of official game servers.

The rights to the assets and intellectual property of Rise of Nations, Thrones and Patriots, and Rise of Nations: Rise of Legends and the Big Huge Games trademark were sold in the bankruptcy auction of 38 Studios to Microsoft Studios on December 11, 2013. Gross proceeds of the auction totaled $320,000.

Rise of Nations: Extended Edition is a re-release of the main game and the expansion on Steam that was released on June 12, 2014. Graphical changes to the game include updated textures, lighting and water. Other changes to the game include Steamworks integration which will add cloud saves, Steam Trading Cards, achievements, Twitch integration and multiplayer with Elo ranked matches to the game. Extended Edition is developed by SkyBox Labs.

== Reception ==
Reception

Aggregate score
Aggregator	Score
Metacritic	88/100

Review scores
Publication	Score
Computer Gaming World	4/5
Game Informer	9/10
GameSpot	9/10
GameSpy	4.5/5
GameZone	9.1/10
IGN	8.9/10
PC Format	76%
PC Gamer (US)	90%
PC Zone	89%
X-Play	5/5

Award
Publication	Award
IGN	Best Expansion Pack of 2004

Rise of Nations: Thrones and Patriots received "generally favorable reviews", about two points shy of "universal acclaim", according to the review aggregation website Metacritic. In its review, IGN claimed that Thrones and Patriots is "a great game [which] gets better," in reference to its predecessor Rise of Nations. Computer Gaming World stated that the game is what expansion packs should try to mimic. Game Informer declared that Rise of Nations: Thrones and Patriots is "one of the essential pieces of any strategy gamer’s collection." GameSpot commented that the game is a terrific experience and it not only provides exceptional content, but that it also improves an already good game.

In the expansion pack, many insignificant changes were introduced to complement the existing game structure, rather than radically alter it, and critics considered the continuing of the original game format to be good. GameSpy claimed that, even with all of Thrones and Patriots' additions, the framework of the game still feels excellent. However, IGN declared that the developers only added many features into the game "in the hopes that it would seem coherent," rather than actually giving the game a "central theme."

Both IGN and GameSpot claimed the game's government mechanics were similar to those of the game series Civilization. However, GameSpy stated the game's artificial intelligence for "managing the individual movements of units and citizens...[was] strategically brain dead." Their review explained that the wide range of upgrades, units, and technology research in different buildings requires micromanagement and the use of hotkeys, especially during online play. The review stated that the game had biased gameplay times in single-player with different nations, such as Lakota having very limited use, and Americans having a massive amount of playtime.

GameSpot stated that the multiplayer functionality of Rise of Nations: Thrones and Patriots had some lag, even when on a local network. Computer Gaming World reported problems with crashes in both the single and multiplayer modes of Thrones and Patriots.

GameSpot and IGN both awarded Rise of Nations: Thrones and Patriots "Best Expansion Pack" of 2004. The latter publication acclaimed the additions of more playable nations and new government mechanics that Rise of Nations didn't have, and the new "Conquer the World" campaigns. Computer Games Magazine nominated Thrones and Patriots for its 2004 "Expansion of the Year" award, but it lost to Call of Duty: United Offensive.
