= Lost Cities (video game) =

2008 video game

- Developer(s): Sierra Online Shanghai
- Publisher(s): Vivendi Games (Note: Released under the Sierra Online brand name)
- Platform(s): Xbox 360
- Release: April 23, 2008
- Genre(s): Designer card game
- Mode(s): Single-player, multiplayer

Lost Cities is card game for the Xbox 360, based upon the popular card game of the same name by game designer Reiner Knizia, published by Vivendi Games under their Sierra Online division and developed by Sierra Online Shanghai, formally known as Studio Ch'in. The game was released on April 23, 2008. It has since disappeared from Xbox Live Arcade.

== Gameplay ==
Typical gameplay screenshot

The gameplay is identical to the card game: each player is dealt eight cards, which consist of 5 "suits" that represent individual expeditions, with each "suit" consisting of 3 Investment cards which multiply the value of an expedition, and 9 Expedition Cards numbered 2 through 10. The players are dealt 8 cards and build their expeditions by stacking the numbers in increasing order, and may draw from the deck or the 5 discard piles. The round ends when all of the cards have been played or discarded.

The round is scored by subtracting 20 from the value of each expedition, and multiplying each with the Investment cards. Failure to achieve 20 points in each expedition results in a negative score for that attempt, or no points if a total of 20 is exactly made. Investments in a failed expedition exacerbates the negative score.

A game consists of three rounds. The player with the most points accumulated after the rounds wins the game.

== Features ==
Lost Cities featured leaderboards and online multiplayer through Xbox Live, including support for the Xbox Live Vision camera. When playing offline, players could play against one of three different computerized (AI) opponents, each corresponding to a different difficulty level.

Lastly, in addition to allowing standard two player games, Lost Cities included alternate rules to support four player (two vs. two) matches.

== Reception ==
Lost Cities has been praised for "finely tuned balance of luck and skill...that made Lost Cities a hit with card- and board-game fans, and this version just makes all of that even better." in a review by IGN's TeamXbox writer David Chapman. While Chapman praised the "Simple gameplay", another IGN reviewer, Ryan Geddes suggested the title's gameplay lacked depth.

As of May 2009, the game has an aggregate score of 66/100 on Metacritic.

== Delisting ==
In early 2009, Lost Cities was removed from the Xbox Live Marketplace. At the time, it was only the second game for which this has happened. No official reason was given for the removal, but speculation centered on copyright issues over the merger of Activision and Vivendi, the latter being the parent company of Sierra, publisher of Lost Cities.

== See also ==
- Catan
- Carcassonne (video game)
- Ticket to Ride (video game)
