= Rise of Nations =

Real-time strategy video game by Big Huge Games

- Developers: Big Huge Games; Westlake Interactive (Mac); Skybox Labs(Extended Edition) (Note: SkyBox Labs worked on the Extended Edition.)
- Publishers: Microsoft Game Studios; MacSoft (Mac)
- Designer: Brian Reynolds
- Composer: Duane Decker
- Engine: Big Huge Engine
- Platforms: Microsoft Windows, OS X
- Release: NA: May 20, 2003; EU: May 23, 2003; Gold Edition: WW: October 28, 2004 (PC); WW: November 2004 (Mac); Extended Edition: WW: June 12, 2014 (Steam); WW: September 14, 2017 (Microsoft Store)
- Genre: Real-time strategy
- Modes: Single-player, multiplayer

Rise of Nations is a real-time strategy video game developed by Big Huge Games and published by Microsoft Game Studios in May 2003. Designed as a fusion of concepts from turn-based strategy games with the real-time strategy genre, the game's development was led by Brian Reynolds, who founded Big Huge Games following his involvement in the development of the turn-based strategy games Civilization II and Sid Meier's Alpha Centauri. In contrast to previous historical real-time strategy games, Rise of Nations is based on the entirety of history, taking place from the ancient era to the modern age, and features eighteen civilizations, playable across eight ages of world history. The game features several innovations on the real-time strategy genre, introducing novel features such as territory and attrition influenced by the turn-based strategy and 4X genres.

Rise of Nations received positive reception upon release, with praise directed to its novel features in the genre and broader scope of gameplay. Several contemporary and retrospective publications have nominated the game in lists of the best strategy games of the year and of all time.

An expansion titled Rise of Nations: Thrones and Patriots, was released in 2004, featuring additional monuments, nations, governments, and campaigns. A spin-off title with a fantasy theme, Rise of Legends, was released in 2006. Big Huge Games was acquired by 38 Studios in 2009, who sold the rights to Rise of Nations to Microsoft following their closure in 2012. Rise of Nations was published by Microsoft as a digital re-release as Rise of Nations: Extended Edition by developer SkyBox Labs in 2014 for Steam and 2017 for Microsoft Store.

== Gameplay ==
In-game screenshot

The core of Rise of Nations's gameplay centers around the concept of "territory". The area near the player's settlements is considered their territory, and players may only construct buildings within their territory or that of an ally (with the exception of the Lakota). A nation's borders can be expanded by the creation and expansion of cities and forts, a technology tree, and obtaining access to certain rare resources. Other technologies and resources cause enemy units within a nation's borders to suffer attrition over time, which can eventually destroy an unsupplied invasion force.

Citizens in Rise of Nations gather resources, or build or repair damaged buildings. All of the six resource types in Rise of Nations are infinite in supply.

Any of the game's nations can be played during any age, regardless of that nation's fate throughout actual history. Each of the 18 civilizations in Rise of Nations has 4 to 8 unique units. Some unique units are based on units that those nations would have, if they were not destroyed in real-life. For example, the Native American nations (the Aztecs, Maya, and Inca) have unique units in the Modern and Information ages which resemble real-world Iberian-South American guerrillas. There are 4 end conditions: capture, territorial superiority, wonder victory, or score victory.

Gameplay focuses heavily on creating a balance between offense, defense, and economy. Generalship is also needed in this game like most RTS games; this includes a knowledge of the troops and what they are good at fighting. For example, pikemen are better than cannon at killing cavalry. Terrain plays a major part in this game and knowing the terrain is an important asset in battle. Generals can also be created from a fort to aid an army.

Five tactical formations are also available, including the ability to compress or expand the line of battle. When a formation is chosen, the selected units automatically reposition themselves accordingly, typically with faster moving units in the front and slower moving, vulnerable units in the rear.

In a manner similar to chess, slight strategic mistakes early in the game can turn into major tactical problems later on. For example, if a player starts with the nomad setting where no city is built at the start, it is wise to scout for an area that has resources before building a city, for without resources building units and structures is difficult and the player will lose.

A single-player campaign, Conquer the World, is included in the game. It is comparable to the board game Risk, except that attacks are resolved with a real-time battle, which can last as long as 90 minutes depending upon the scenario. The player can also purchase reinforcements or bonus cards and engage in diplomacy with other nations. Bonus cards and reinforcement cards must be deployed from the Map screen. If the Player attacks a Nation's capital from the Map screen and wins, all of the territory belonging to that Nation come under the control of the Player and that Nation is eliminated. The campaign starts at the Ancient Age and progresses slowly over the course over the campaign to end at the Information Age (present day). During a battle it may be possible to advance to the next available age and upgrade units for the battle.

Rise of Nations uses an Elo rating system to rank players.

=== Units ===
There are more than 100 different units in Rise of Nations, ranging from the Ancient Age Hoplite to the Information Age Stealth Bomber. Military units are created at certain structures: the Barracks, Stable/Auto Plant, Siege Factory/Factory, Dock/Shipyard/Anchorage, Airbase, Missile silo, and Fort/Castle/Fortress/Redoubt.

Most Infantry units operate in squads of three, and when a player builds an infantry unit, three soldiers are produced, rather than just one soldier. Exceptions to this rule are: Scout and Special Forces units, armed civilians, flamethrowers, and machine gunners.

Unit types, such as Light Infantry, Heavy Infantry, and Ranged Cavalry, can be upgraded as the player advances through the ages. These upgrades usually represent revolutionary changes in their particular field. For example, the Arquebusier of the Gunpowder Age becomes the Musketeer of the Enlightenment Age, representing the great advantage of flintlock muskets over the earlier matchlock muskets and showing increased attack power and reload speed. Also, each nation gets its own set of unique units. For example, the Greeks can build Companion cavalry; the Russians can build Red Guards infantry and T-80 tanks; the British can build Longbowmen, Highlanders, and Avro Lancaster Bombers; and the Germans get the Tiger and Leopard tanks. In the Thrones and Patriots expansion pack, the Americans can build various Marine units.

Because of the wide variety of units in the game, players have the opportunity to create an army customized to their tastes. Most units have a cost that is roughly equal to that of their peers. Additionally, most units use only two resource types, making the creation of diverse armies easier and almost required. Terraced costs further contribute to the incentive for a diverse army, as each additional unit a player creates of a single type will cost slightly more than the last.

=== Wonders ===
Wonders are important buildings in the game. They are real-life structures ranging from the Colossus and the Pyramids to the Supercollider and Space Program. They provide various benefits such as improving resource gathering or making units cheaper. Building wonders can also allow a player to win the game if "wonder victory" is chosen as a custom setting of the game, as each wonder is worth a preset number of "wonder points". As the game progresses, wonders become more expensive, but generate more points. For example, the Supercollider is worth eight times as many wonder points as the Pyramids.

=== Multiplayer ===
GameSpy originally used to host the game but currently does not host the game on their servers. The LAN networking, implemented on both platforms, provides a system for people on the same network to play together. There is also a Direct-IP option, allowing non-networked players to connect without the use of GameSpy. Cross-platform play is not supported between Windows and Mac users.

The game is currently available on Steam which makes multiplayer games simple to create.

== Development and release ==
Rise of Nations was developed by Big Huge Games, a studio founded by lead developer Brian Reynolds in April 2000. Reynolds and other key development staff had previously worked with Sid Meier under MicroProse and Firaxis Games, developing turn-based strategy games including those in the Civilization series. Designer Doug Kaufman stated that the decision of Reynolds to lead an independent project was the belief that turn-based strategy games were "on the decline" and the resistance from Firaxis Games to support a proposal to explore real-time gameplay elements in the Civilization series. Rise of Nations was developed by a team of twenty-five full staff and several additional contractors, with the core team largely composed of the former developers from MicroProse and Firaxis Games.

In August 2000, Big Huge Games secured a publishing deal with Microsoft to develop multiple titles. The game was announced as the flagship project of Big Huge Games and showcased at the Microsoft International Games Festival at Las Vegas in February 2002. Previews of Rise of Nations were also shown by Microsoft at several events, including Gen Con in August 2002, and E3 in May 2003. Microsoft released a public beta of Rise of Nations in February 2003 with a competition to receive one of 1,000 beta copies of the game. In March 2003, Microsoft announced a minor delay of the game from the originally planned release date of April 22 to May 20 to allow the development team to refine the game. The gold master of Rise of Nations was finalised in April 2003, and released on May 20 for North America and May 23 for Europe.

=== Design ===
The development process for Rise of Nations involved considerable use of "prototyping and iteration" to introduce novel features to the real-time strategy format. Lead developer Brian Reynolds stated that the game was developed by brainstorming "ten random ideas" of "cool things to do in a real-time game...those things that didn't work we took out, and some of them worked really well." Reynolds stated that the inclusion of attrition, national borders, and city capture were features adopted from the turn-based strategy game genre. One idea abandoned in early development, the inclusion of different models of government, later became a core component of the Thrones and Patriots expansion. In other areas, prototyping led to refining and "radical scaling back" aspects of gameplay that were not working, including a complex technology tree, described by Reynolds as "a disaster" and "totally unworkable", simplifying the design of technology to be "more distinct" and "exclusive".

Rise of Nations was developed with the core design objective of ensuring that rounds of the game could be played within a short timeframe. Brian Reynolds stated that Microsoft required Big Huge Games to demonstrate the "feasibility" of the game's progression, as "no-one could imagine very well that you could do a history game of all of history and not have it take six hours to play. To this end, they even had software milestones to achieve along the way to prove (the game) could play within an hour." Reynolds stated that some of the key challenges of implementing this pacing were "developing enough different types of artwork" between eras, and creating balanced gameplay across the large amount of unit types in the game, acknowledging "we erred in making aircraft and the offensive units in general too powerful".

The 'Conquer the World' campaign of Rise of Nations formed a major undertaking in the development process, taking over six months to integrate in the game. Designer and scenario editor Ike Ellis stated that the developers abandoned an original plan to involve a chain of linear single player scenarios, stating the idea was "too boring" and that the game lacked "graphic scale small enough to make it work around individual characters". Ellis stated that the design of the mode was heavily influenced by the board game Diplomacy, with the use of supply centers forming the foundation of the mode. Producer Tim Train stated that combat in Rise of Nations was developed with an "epic" and "more strategic" scope, and determined the preference in gameplay design towards "directing armies and troops" and away from "a smaller focus with only a few units on the screen" and the inclusion of special units and abilities.

=== Audio ===
The soundtrack of Rise of Nations was composed by Duane Decker, who had previously worked on sound for the MechWarrior series of games. Decker described the soundtrack as a "combination of world music with unique cinematic music styles", featuring "some very expressive performances on rare, ethnic instruments and mixes in modern elements." Decker's composition process involved considerable research of "unfamiliar" world music styles, stating "I listened to everything from Irish whistle, to Russian balalaika, to Tuvan throat singers", and was composed as a combination of sampled and live instruments. A DVD of the soundtrack, containing a Dolby Digital 5.1 and DTS 5.1 surround sound stereo mix of the game opening cinematics, and production interviews, was released on June 24, 2003. The soundtrack was released by Sumthing Else, the company of musician and executive producer, Nile Rodgers, who had expressed interest in releasing soundtracks of Microsoft titles. The soundtrack is unique as the first video game soundtrack to be released on the DVD format in surround sound.

== Reception ==
=== Sales ===
Rise of Nations and its expansion pack Rise of Nations: Thrones and Patriots have received combined sales of over 1 million copies. In the United States, Rise of Nations sold 420,000 copies and earned $15.9 million by August 2006, after its release in May 2003. It was the country's 35th best-selling computer game between January 2000 and August 2006. Combined sales of all Rise of Nations-related games released between January 2000 and August 2006 had reached 700,000 units in the United States by the latter date.

=== Critical reviews ===
Reception

Aggregate score
Aggregator	Score
Metacritic	89/100

Review scores
Publication	Score
Computer Gaming World	4/5
Edge	7/10
Eurogamer	9/10
Game Informer	9/10
GamePro	4/5
GameRevolution	B+
GameSpot	9.3/10
GameSpy	4.5/5
GameZone	9.5/10
IGN	8.2/10
PC Gamer (US)	93%
PC PowerPlay	88%

Rise of Nations received a unanimously positive reception from critics, with review aggregation website Metacritic stating the game received "generally favorable reviews" at an average score of 89%. Many critics praised the innovative design of the game for its fusion of real-time strategy game with turn-based strategy features. Writing for Eurogamer, Rob Fahey praised the game as an "innovative and massively enjoyable strategy title that incorporates many of the best elements of two well-loved genres...and this combination has yielded one of the most accessible, playable and deep strategy games of all time." Elliott Chin of GameSpot stated the "two distinct styles of strategy have come together in the form of a truly excellent game", stating "what really sets Rise of Nations apart are all the new concepts it introduces..(making) the game deeper and in many ways more enjoyable than any other real-time strategy game to date." PC Gamer stated that "Rise of Nations genuinely pushes the genre forward by introducing, and then perfectly using, some very cool gameplay mechanics such as the impact of national borders, attrition, alliances, and how cities are captured."

The 'Conquer the World' mode of Rise of Nations received particular attention. Writing for GameSpy, William Abner stated that the mode was "an absolute blast...it's a great minigame that an infinite amount of replay value for the solo gamer. It helps make Rise of Nations a complete game." Rob Fahey of Eurogamer stated the mode was "an excellent substitute for a linear campaign mode, although we're a little disappointed at how simple the turn-based boardgame play is." GamePro stated that the mode was a "great twist on the usual story mode", but critiqued the "deja vu" and "lack of variety" after successive rounds in this mode. Elliott Chin of GameSpot praised the mode as "enjoyable, if a bit simple, (as) it adds a substantial single-player component to the game," whilst noting that "this campaign, which is really just a glorified version of Risk, isn't as developed as the actual real-time game."

Reviewers were also mixed on the ease of use of combat mechanics of the game. Whilst IGN praised the "extremely good interface", "commonsense approach to grouping units" and "automation applied to non-military units", IGN noted that "things can become pretty unwieldy in massive battles", describing multiplayer battles as a "nearly mindless clickfest." Di Luo of Computer Gaming World observed combat to feature too many "overwhelming" mechanics, stating "throw in attrition, supply, spies and commandos into the mix, and you'll probably need four hands and eight eyes to manage everything properly at normal speed settings." Rob Fahey of Eurogamer noted the game's speed "makes it a little too tricky to pull off tactical moves, with frantic mouse clicking required in combat to get your units to perform flanking manoeuvres and the like."

Some critics of the game noted that Rise of Nations lacked depth in its variety of ages and nations due to the broad scope of the game. GameSpy remarked that the game was "bloated with features, options and units." Game Informer critiqued the variation of abilities across nations, stating "such a varied array of nationalities is a beautiful thing, but not all nations are created equal. Some have excellent bonuses incorporated with them, and others are decidedly ho-hum." Similarly IGN stated "yes, there are many races available, but none of them have a personality as such...(they) look the same, since they only employ three different graphic sets...so the racial distinctions feel abstract, rather than part of an immersive experience." However, John Dewhurst for PC PowerPlay noted that "harsh critics could label its diversity too light to be truly immersive and they may have a point. However, for once, a game trying to do too many things is its greatest asset."

=== Accolades ===
GameSpot named Rise of Nations the best computer game of May 2003.

Rise of Nations won PC Gamer US's 2003 "Best Real-Time Strategy Game" award, and was a runner-up in the magazine's "Best Game of 2003" category, which went to Knights of the Old Republic. The publication's William Harms called it "a blueprint for the genre's future" and "how RTS games should be made from here on out". Computer Games Magazine named Rise of Nations the fifth-best computer game of 2003, and presented it with an award for "Best Interface". The editors wrote that the game "succeeds in a big way, and is about as addictive as they come." The editors of Computer Gaming World nominated Rise of Nations for their 2003 "Strategy Game of the Year" award, but it lost to Age of Wonders: Shadow Magic.

During the 7th Annual Interactive Achievement Awards, the Academy of Interactive Arts & Sciences nominated Rise of Nations for four awards: "Game of the Year", "Computer Game of the Year", "Computer Strategy Game of the Year", and "Outstanding Innovation in Computer Gaming".

=== Retrospective reception ===
Rise of Nations has received a favorable retrospective reception. Several publications cited the game as one of the best strategy games of all time, including PC Gamer, who praised the game's "smartly-introduced elements from turn-based strategy games like Civilization", and Rock Paper Shotgun, praising it as a "complex and rewarding game" and "the closest thing to a real-time take on Civilization that we've seen", and PC PowerPlay, who praised the game as "cohesive and elegant", stating "the real accomplishment is that it manages to make a flowing tech tree from (the) Stone Age to (the) Information Age and keeps the action pumping the whole time."

The game was included in the 2010 book 1001 Video Games You Must Play Before You Die, with contributor Alec Meer praising the game for the "speed, focus, and its tightness" of its gameplay, stating "the key is that it takes the core model of turn-based strategy games...then implants it at the warlike heart of a real-time strategy game." Also writing for Rock Paper Shotgun, Nate Crowley stated Rise of Nations was an underappreciated game that "just hasn't stuck around in the collective understanding of the RTS pantheon", praising the game as "well-balanced, diverse in its offering of civ-specific perks, and a superb choice for fast-paced, messy multiplayer games."

== Legacy ==
In a postmortem of the game in 2003, Brian Reynolds discussed that the developer was "extremely happy with how Rise of Nations turned out", highlighting the game's development team and design approach, and the level of support from publisher Microsoft. Reynolds stated that the failure to identify a "clear idea of the kind of game we were making" in the first year of development, and difficulty with the design of linear scenarios leading to the decision to design the Conquer The World mode, were major lessons learned in the development period for the game. In a retrospective for Rock Paper Shotgun in 2007, Reynolds stated he was "hugely proud of" the game, linking the game's commercial success to its innovations on the "merging of two genres", whilst noting the game featured some minor disappointments, including the "cool but half-way polished" city capture system, and the potential to have developed "better graphics" for the game.

Rise of Nations was influential to the development of Age of Empires 4. Executive producer Shannon Loftis stated that as the game was influential as a "spiritual successor" to the Age of Empires franchise, and lessons learned from its development assisted in setting expectations for the content of Age of Empires 4.

== Expansions and sequels ==
=== Thrones and Patriots ===
On April 28, 2004, Big Huge Games released the expansion pack Rise of Nations: Thrones and Patriots. The game includes several additional nations, units, wonders, and campaigns, and new features, including the selection of governments that influence gameplay mechanics. In October 2004, a Gold Edition of the game was released for Windows and Macintosh, combining the original game with the Thrones and Patriots expansion.

=== Rise of Legends ===
In May 2006, Big Huge Games released Rise of Nations: Rise of Legends, a fantasy-themed spin-off with similar gameplay.

=== Extended Edition ===
Rise of Nations: Extended Edition was an enhanced re-release of the main game and its expansion released by SkyBox Labs for Steam on June 12, 2014, and for the Windows 10 Store on September 14, 2017, including Xbox Live achievements and cross-play with the Steam version. Graphical changes to the game included updated textures, lighting and water. Other changes to the game included Steamworks integration, adding cloud saves, Steam Trading Cards, achievements, Twitch integration and multiplayer with Elo ranked matches to the game.

=== Cancelled sequels ===
Following release, Microsoft cancelled its deal with Big Huge Games to produce successive Rise of Nations titles, including plans to develop Rise of Nations 2. In addition, 38 Studios developed an unreleased Rise of Nations game, titled Rise of Nations: Tactics, following their acquisition of Big Huge Games in 2009. Tactics was a completed but unreleased title, discovered following the examination of 38 Studios servers by liquidators prior to auction of the company's assets. Developer Stuart Jeff, who worked on Tactics for the studio, described the game was a mobile turn-based strategy game for iOS inspired by Advance Wars with multiplayer and social networking features, but left the studio before the game was complete. Development was later led by Andy Johnson, who stated the game needed "three months of proper development time" for the game to launch at the time 38 Studios ceased operations in 2012. Assets and intellectual property for the Rise of Nations games were sold to an unknown buyer in December 2013.
