= Carpe Fulgur =

Video game localization studio

- Company type: Private
- Industry: Video games localization
- Founded: June 2010
- Defunct: September 25, 2025
- Key people: Andrew Dice, Robin Light-Williams (founders)
- Website: www.carpefulgur.com

Carpe Fulgur was a game localization studio that concentrated on making independent Japanese games available to the English-language market. The studio consisted of founders Andrew Dice and Robin Light-Williams.

== History ==
Andrew Dice and Robin Light-Williams met through the Something Awful forums. Dice had been interested in English translations of Japanese games and following in the footsteps of Ted Woolsey in the translation of several Square Japanese titles. After attempting to gain employment at a localization company in California, Dice contacted Light-Williams and proposed the idea of forming their own company for performing localizations. Dice said he saw value in bringing Japanese titles to the West as "above all what the Western gaming audience likes is a unique experience", an opportunity afforded by the growing dōjin market in Japan.

After forming Carpe Fulgur, Dice and Light-Williams considered approaching Gust Corporation, offering their services to translate games from the Atelier series, but ultimately decided against the idea. Light-Williams suggested the idea of approaching dōjin soft developers, as while titles from major Japanese developers have often been localized in English, there had been no effort for doing the same with the dōjin market. Williams specifically suggested Recettear, which had favorable word-of-mouth in Japan, and whose developers, EasyGameStation, were eager to open the game to the Western market. Though there was some trepidation due to the distance between countries and between Dice and Light-Williams (who, at the time, lived on opposite sides of the United States), EasyGameStation agreed to work with Carpe Fulgur for the translation. The company was formally registered in June 2010 just before the group's first release, Recettear.

When working on the translation of The Legend of Heroes: Trails in the Sky SC, Carpe Fulgur had faced numerous difficulties, such as inconsistencies with the files' formats between the original release and the translation, different names and terms from those of the previous installments in The Legend of Heroes being used in the translation, and the lack of a firm contract for two years. Xseed Games had questioned and criticized Carpe Fulgur's slow input in that period. The stress of the situation led Dice into a state of depression, where he almost stabbed himself with a knife, but Light-Williams interrupted him. Carpe Fulgur gave the translation rights and files to Xseed following the incident. The translation had around 716,401 words, more than the original Lord of the Rings trilogy's 455,125.

On September 25, 2025, Robin Light-Williams announced on X that Dice had died. With Dice's death, Light-Williams closed down Carpe Fulgur and was starting the process to return the rights to the games they translated back to their original developers.
