= Rise of Nations: Rise of Legends =

2006 video game

- Developer: Big Huge Games
- Publisher: Microsoft Game Studios
- Designer: Brian Reynolds
- Platform: Microsoft Windows
- Release: NA: May 9, 2006; EU: May 26, 2006
- Genre: Real-time strategy
- Modes: Single-player, multiplayer

Rise of Nations: Rise of Legends is a science fantasy real-time strategy video game for Microsoft Windows, made by Big Huge Games, and published by Microsoft. It is a spin-off of the Rise of Nations, released in May 2006. However, rather than being a historical game, it is based in a fantasy world, where technology and magic co-exist. It was released on May 9, 2006 in North America and on various dates around May 26, 2006 in the rest of the world.

== Gameplay ==
Rise of Legends retains most of the features from Rise of Nations, like city building, borders, attrition, assimilations, non-depletable resources and the Conquer The World (CTW) campaigns. However, Rise of Legends also introduces new features of its own, such as city districts, heroes, dominances, a more simplified economy (with only two resources) and neutral, siegeable units and buildings. The reality-based resource wood has been replaced by Timonium. Unlike its predecessor, which offered the player 18 civilizations to choose from, Rise of Legends has only three races. These are the technological Vinci, the magical Alin, and the alien-like Cuotl, who replace the Wealth resource with Energy, offering a new gather strategy. Each race is completely distinct from the others, allowing for different gameplay depending on the player's choice. It also makes use of the AGEIA PhysX physics engine.

Rise of Legends has a number of unique features that set it apart from its predecessor.

=== City districts and buildings ===
Unlike most RTS-type games, in which a player starts with a city center and expands from there, Rise of Legends gives the player a city center, but adds a second, distinct building class: Districts. There are five districts in the game; they vary between the three races, but mostly serve the same purpose of increasing the size of the city, as well as offering benefits that will be elaborated upon later. The other buildings include the standard unit factories and defensive structures, as well as unique buildings for each race. The following is a list of the five different districts:

District	Description
Military	Increases the population capacity of the player, as well as adding to the defensive force of the host city. Each Military District also gives the player free Infantry units, as well as one retroactively given per Palace upgrade.
Merchant	Used to increase the player's caravan limit, the player's resource collection capacity and trade income capacity for the city. It is only available to the Alin and Vinci. The Cuotl utilize a Reactor district to gather their Energy resource, which negates the need for a caravan unit by directly adding to the player's coffer, according to the total number of reactor districts and the number of neutral sites owned.
Palace	Used to expand the city in size, which affects the overall effectiveness of all the other city districts. It is also the most expensive of the four districts, with a base price of 250 Timonium (or 150 of each, energy and Timonium, for the Cuotl) as opposed to the previous district costing 75. A Palace District can only be built if at least three non-Palace districts per Palace upgrade level exist for that city. A Palace District turns a City with at least three districts into a Large City (the first of which is designated as the player's Capital city, or home city), and a Large City with at least six districts (plus the Palace District necessary for the earlier upgrade) into a Great City. As well as increasing the aforementioned effectiveness, upgrading to a large or great city unlocks more powerful unit types and research abilities.
Magus	Only available to the Alin, this district is used for researching new technologies.
Industrial	Only available to the Vinci, this district unlocks special upgrades and increases construction speeds.

=== Master units ===
Master Units are enormous units when compared to standard units, and are therefore extremely powerful. A player may only have one Master Unit at a time. Each unit has its own set of powerful abilities, and is equally effective against infantry, large units, or buildings. Master units can only be accessed after creating a Great City; they also require huge amounts of resources.

The Vinci control the Land Leviathan, also upgradable to the King Leviathan. The Alin have the Glass Dragon, also upgradable to the Elder Glass Dragon. The Cuotl hold the City of Vengeance, upgradable to Great City of Vengeance. Three other master units, the Elder Glass Golem, the Moon Gorilla, and the Scavenger Boss can be created by the neutral sites the Glass Lair, the Moon Core, and the Scrapyard respectively. The Elder Glass Golem is a massive beast that resembles the Alins' Glass Golem but is much larger, has no ranged attack, and has a mana counter just like an Alin hero's. It also splits into 2 Adult Glass Golems when killed. The Moon Gorilla is a giant relative of the Cuotl Sun Idol with a powerful attack and siege attack ability, supplemented with a strong air attack and devastating trample. The Scavenger Boss acts like a Land Leviathan. Yet another unit that can be acquired in another map, created in the Moon Temple, is Ix the Moon God, the fourth Cuotl deity.

=== Hero units ===
Each race has its own set of Hero Units. Hero units are generally stronger, faster and more powerful than normal units, as well as having their own unique skill tree, which gives the hero powers, or upgrades existing powers. For the most part, powers act like spells, and are cast during the game, though there are some passive powers too. Heroes also level up (the conditions for levelling up varies), with each level increasing their stats. Heroes have to be summoned into the game, which costs a certain number of resources (different per hero), and multiple heroes can be summoned at the same time. As well, if a hero dies, he can be resummoned. There are three heroes per civilization, and these heroes have larger roles in the single-player campaigns [along with other heroes not included in Single- and Multi-player Random Maps].

=== Single-player gameplay ===
The single player game is divided into three campaigns, one for each race in the game (although the "player character" throughout all three campaigns is Giacomo, the original Vinci hero, whose appearance and army changes depending on which campaign is being played). Each campaign presents the player with a large map of a region of Aio, divided into multiple city sections (similar to the board game Risk). The campaigns are divided into two segments: managing the Strategic Map and playing individual scenarios.

==== Strategic map ====
The strategic map is an overview of the current region that the campaign being played covers. It is divided into a number of smaller sections, each of which representing a scenario to be played. Each of these sections are colour-coded as well, representing which race (in the Alin campaign), or the army (in the Vinci and Cuotl campaigns) controls it. As well, the strategic map contains a representation of the player's army (represented by an avatar of Giacomo), as well as any enemy armies that are on the map, represented by an avatar of each of their heroes.

Each section of the region contains a capital city. Similar to cities in scenarios, capital cities can be upgraded with four different districts (Military, Merchant/Reactor, Industrial/Magic, Palace). The capital cities allow for management of four critical resources – Research, Military, Wealth and Hero:

- Research points allow the player to upgrade their unit's abilities. A city will generate one research point the turn after adding a research/magic district. The Vinci use research points to upgrade units to more powerful versions; the Alin use research points to upgrade various statistics across their army or across a unit type.
- Military points are used to expand the army that is provided at the start of a level. Military districts generate one military point per turn, starting the turn after being created, and provide defense from enemy armies. As well, cities with Military districts send free reinforcements when playing in an adjacent territory.
- Wealth points allow the player to add further districts to their cities on the strategic map. Each city upgrade costs progressively more wealth points. Merchant districts can be added to cities, and generate one wealth point per turn, starting the turn after being built. As well, cities with Merchant districts send free caravans to the player's city when playing an adjacent territory.
- Hero points allow the player to upgrade their heroes' powers and abilities. Hero points cannot be generated by cities, but instead are rewarded for completing levels.

Similarly to cities within a scenario, capital cities on the strategic map can be upgraded with Palace districts after three and six other districts have been added to the city. Palace districts supply one of each resource type (other than Hero) per turn.

The player is given access to the strategic map in between playing scenarios (each of which makes up a "turn"). After each turn, new resources are allotted (if applicable) and enemy armies may move or capture sections (including ones under the player's control). The player then can choose which section to move their army into next (thereby starting the associated scenario); often, there is more than one path that can be taken. The player may also move their army into an adjacent friendly territory before launching a scenario. However, if the player makes two moves without starting a scenario, enemy armies will all receive a turn, while the player's resources will not increase.

In order to defeat enemy armies, the player has to either conquer a territory the army is located within, or defeat the army's capital city territory (in this case, defeating the enemy army in a non-capital city territory will cause the army to retreat). In any case, entering a scenario in a territory occupied by an enemy army will cause that army (and its associated hero unit) to be present in the scenario. Enemy armies can also attack the player's territories. Each turn that an enemy army attacks a territory destroys one of its Military districts, if any exist. When no Military districts exist, the attacking enemy army takes control of the district.

To complete a campaign, all territories do not need to be under the player's control; rather, all territories marked as main quest goals (with an icon of a golden chalice) need to be completed.

==== Scenarios ====
The single-player campaign is divided into a number of different scenarios, each of which being its own level, which are accessible by moving the player's army into a territory on the strategic map. The levels generally are of one of two types:

- Plot driving levels, which advance the plot by having a series of main goals to accomplish (such as capturing enemy resource production facilities, rescuing prisoners, or destroying enemy strongholds), as well as often having bonus quests which often provide the player with extra resources (often in the form of special buildings or units) to make use of. These levels often have more than one other faction present, either as allies or enemies. Additional hero units can also occasionally be automatically given—instead of having to be summoned via these levels. The majority of the scenarios are of this type.
- Territory capture levels where the player is pitted against just one hostile faction. There is only one main quest in these levels: drive the enemy out of the territory by capturing all of their cities (capturing the enemy's capital city is an automatic win condition). There are generally just two or three maps per campaign for this kind of level, even though they take place in different territories on the strategic map. Recovering a captured territory on the strategic map whose scenario was already completed always spawns this type of level.

At the end of each level, the player is rewarded with a number of hero points in order to upgrade their Hero units. As well, each scenario is assigned a number of other upgrades on the strategic map, which are awarded upon victory; these include special powers which can be used in future scenarios (a unique set of eight such powers exists for each campaign), extra army units, or bonus Military/Research/Wealth points for use on the strategic map.

=== Civilizations ===
There are three unique races in Rise of Legends - the research-driven Vinci, the magic-using Alin, and the technologically advanced Cuotl.

==== Vinci ====
The Vinci are a highly technological, steampunk civilization, whose buildings and armed forces rely heavily on the steam engine, clockwork and gunpowder. Its designs are highly influenced by the sixteenth century Italian Renaissance inventor and artist, Leonardo da Vinci. They are led by Giacomo, the Inventor of Miana, who provides the Vinci with a wide variety of creations to use on the battlefield. The main Vinci adversary is the Doge of Venucci, who has created a giant city-leveling cannon, the "Doge Hammer," and was responsible for the death of Giacomo's brother, Petruzzo, Lord of Miana.

The Vinci national power is Industrial Devastation, which causes giant bores and drills to rise from beneath the earth, damaging anything in the area, throwing smaller units to the ground, and prohibiting the construction of buildings on that area for a short time. Further research into the Mining research track increases the power and radius of the attack. The Vinci also have access to a unique form of currency, "Prototype Points," which are gained by building Industrial Districts. These Research Points are spent at a specialized structure, the Prototype factory: for each point, the player is allowed to choose one of three topics, which may grant them army-wide upgrades, unique units which cannot be gained any other way, or an increase in Timonium income. Later, the player may also choose to receive large amounts of Wealth, an upgrade in unit production, or a free powerful unit.

==== Alin ====
The Alin are a magical civilization, relying on Sand, Fire and Glass magic to create their infrastructure and army. The civilization is based on Arabian and Middle Eastern mythologies, such as 1001 Arabian Nights, and contains units such as Giant Scorpions, Salamanders and Dragons. They live in the Kalahese desert, mainly in the capital city of Azar Harif, and are led by the King and his daughter Arri, a master of fire magic.

A large portion of the Alin territories are "infected" with Dark Glass, a powerful magical element, created by the Genie Sawu when a mystical object fell from the sky (it was actually a powerful, and destructive, piece of Cuotl technology), that drove him to madness. In order to attempt to contain the infection, Sawu was imprisoned inside the city of Mezekesh, which was subsequently buried within the sands of the desert. However, the infection still spread, causing intermittent periods of Dark Terror, in which hostile Dark Glass creatures became berserk and attacked the Alin without mercy.

The Alin national power is Summon Army, which immediately summons a temporary army to fight for the Alin. The power and size of the army increases with further research along the Evocation track, ranging from a minor battalion to a medium-sized cadre. This, along with the general cheapness of their units and the ability to build unit-making structures anywhere on the map, even enemy territory (though this doubles the structure's cost), makes them adept at both hit-and-run and number-based tactics.

==== Cuotl ====
Though the larger bulk of Cuotl civilization is made up of subjugated indigenous humans, the race is headed by an alien civilization, inspired by the ancient Mayan civilization and the ancient astronaut theory from Chariots of the Gods? Unsolved Mysteries of the Past. Their name resembles that of the Aztec/Mayan God Quetzalcoatl, and indeed a Cuotl air unit is called a "Quetzal Fighter". Four Cuotl beings, possessing high technology indistinguishable from magic, installed themselves as gods over the tribes of the Aio rainforest: Ix, the Moon God; Xil, the Sun God; Shok, Goddess of Storm; and Czin, God of Death. The units of the Cuotl army have both Mesoamerican and science-fiction influences to their design, seemingly constructed from both metal and stone, and many of them feature energy shields or personal cloaking devices. An obvious example of their Mesoamerican influence is Czin's name, which is very similar to that of Kisin's alternate spelling, Cizin, and who like Czin is also a death god.

The Cuotl are logistically different from the other two civilizations in the game. Instead of collecting Wealth via caravans, the Cuotl harvest Energy through reactors, which is used to create buildings and fund heroes' powers. Similarly, rather than purchasing neutral sites with Wealth as the other two civilizations do, the Cuotl expend Timonium to "subjugate" them. (Because Timonium is so much easier to obtain than Wealth or Energy, this creates game-balance issues which are resolved by the sharply-increasing costs of subjugation overall.)

The Cuotl national power, Star Bolt, summons a contracting halo of intense light, which damages all enemy units and structures within its circumference. Curiously, it is selectable by mouse and can be moved, allowing the player to chase opposing units with it or use it for reconnaissance. By researching the Divine Power research track, the size, power and duration of the Star Bolt increases.

Some pieces of Cuotl technology are dangerous or unstable. One was found by the entity who would become known as Sawu the Dark Alin, and prompted the creation of the corrupting Dark Glass. Another was found within a Mianan mine, and started killing those miners who were exposed to its presence. Yet another piece of Cuotl technology was given to the Doge of Venucci, who incorporated the destructive laser cannon into his personal walker; this cannon overloaded when Giacomo pulled some wires from it, resulting in the Doge's death.

==== Neutral factions ====
Each area of Aio (occupied by the Vinci, Alin and Cuotl) also contain a number of neutral factions, which often have their own unique army units, and can be captured, purchased or subjugated in order to join the player's army. Each neutral faction is only available in one of the three civilizations' territories, and each civilization can obtain the power to create camps belonging to one of their neutral factions. Examples of neutrals are the unindustrialized Vinci men who still ride on horses and live in castles, known as Condottieri, the tribal nomads of the northern mountains, clockwork units created from scrap metal, known as Scavengers, and Cuotl humans who have refused worship of the false gods, known as Fallen Cuotl.

== Plot ==
The game takes place on the world of Aio. Years ago, an alien ship crashed on the planet, breaking into 4 parts. Each part fell on a different region.

The game begins as Lord Petruzzo, ruler of the Vinci city of Miana, his brother Giacomo, and General Carlini are sent with a group of soldiers to recover an object found in a mine shaft that is making the miners sick. When they arrive, they are attacked by the Doge of Venucci, a bloodthirsty warlord, who has already captured the mysterious device. The Doge fires a laser beam at a nearby outcrop, causing an avalanche. The rubble crushes Petruzzo and many of the soldiers. Giacomo sets out on a quest to kill the Doge and avenge his brother.

Along the way, Giacomo's army helps the land of Pirata break a Venucci siege, and Lenora, their leader, joins Giacomo on his quest. Further on, they liberate Venucci political prisoners, and discover that Venucci has access to unknown technology.

Giacomo levels Venucci using a weapon that the Doge intended for Miana, Giacomo's home city, called the Doge Hammer. However, he discovers that the Doge has taken another Hammer to Miana while the battle at Venucci was fought. On returning to Miana, Giacomo finds the city destroyed.

He pursues the Doge into the Alin Desert, where the army is attacked by the Dark Alin Marwan. They are saved by an army led by Giacomo's friend, the Alin princess Arri. She takes Giacomo to the Alin king, who gives him rest but does not offer military aid. He tells the story of Sawu, the Dark Alin who was driven mad by an object that fell from the sky. Sawu began covering the land in a substance called Dark Glass. To stop the spread of Sawu’ influence, he was sealed in the city of Mezekesh. Giacomo leaves to break the seal and stop Sawu once and for all. He is accompanied by Arri, while Lenora returns to Pirata to prepare her armies.

Defeating Sawu cures his insanity. As Sawu is defeated, however, the Doge arrives to take the object that drove Sawu mad. With the help of the armies of Pirata, the object is kept away from the Doge, who is killed. An alien ship arrives at this time to take the Sawu's artifact and the one the Doge stole at the beginning of the game.

Giacomo wants to know more about these "aliens", so he travels to Cuotl Rainforest, where there have been reports of them being seen. When he arrives, he finds Ix, the Moon God, one of the False Gods that rule the Cuotl, searching for an object like the ones mentioned before, now revealed to be pieces of Cuotl technology. Giacomo battles with Ix, but is nearly defeated until Carlini arrives and kills Ix. Czin, the god of death, then arrives, seeking the device. Giacomo attempts to stop him, but is badly injured when the device explodes. Carlini challenges Czin, who kills Carlini with little effort.

Giacomo has gained strange new powers from the explosion, which have altered his body and mind. He spends some time building a robotic walker suit to simulate the power that Ix had, so that he can avenge Carlini's death. He is joined by Kakoolha, rightful leader of the Cuotl, in his assault on the Cuotl gods. When Giacomo's army reaches Czin's capital city, they discover that the Death God is preparing a massive machine that will "talk to the Stars" and bring about the apocalypse. Giacomo confronts Czin inside the massive machine, and eventually kills him. After slaying Czin, Giacomo is faced by a mysterious holographic image of what appears to be an alien. Giacomo then destroys the machine while still inside it, and the entire structure explodes.

Later, in the Vinci city-states, statues of Giacomo are made in remembrance of him, and Lenora is now tasked with the matter of unifying the Vinci under a single banner. Arri leaves to travel the world, exiled by her father, the king, for helping Giacomo. The Cuotl, under Kakhoola's rule, are adapting to the new technology the False Gods spread among them.

== Development ==
38 Studios acquired the rights to Rise of Nations and Rise of Legends, when it acquired Big Huge Games in 2009. After 38 Studios filed for bankruptcy in 2012 its rights to Rise of Nations were sold at an auction to Microsoft.

== Reception ==
=== Critical reception ===
Reception

Aggregate score
Aggregator	Score
Metacritic	84/100

Review scores
Publication	Score
Computer Gaming World	(favorable)
Edge	8/10
Eurogamer	8/10
Game Informer	9.5/10
GameRevolution	B
GameSpot	7.6/10
GameSpy	3.5/5
GameTrailers	8/10
GameZone	9.1/10
IGN	8.2/10
PC Gamer (US)	89%
The Sydney Morning Herald	4.5/5

The game received "generally favorable reviews" according to the review aggregation website Metacritic.

The editors of Computer Games Magazine presented Rise of Legends with their 2006 "Best Art Direction" and "Best Interface" awards, and named it the year's ninth-best computer game overall. They called it "a weirdly absorbing trinket whose true dazzle reveals itself only gradually to the patient eye."

- Game Informer: PC Game of the Month (Issue #159)
- Voodoo Extreme: The Best Game No One Else Liked
- GameSpy: Special Achievement in Art Direction

The Academy of Interactive Arts & Sciences nominated Rise of Legends for "Strategy Game of the Year" at the 10th Annual Interactive Achievement Awards.

=== Sales ===
Despite its positive critical reception, larger team, and bigger budget, the game sold only one-third as many copies as its predecessor Rise of Nations.
