= Age of Empires III: The Asian Dynasties =

2007 video game

- Developers: Ensemble Studios; Big Huge Games; MacSoft (port and updates); Robot Entertainment (updates)
- Publishers: Microsoft Game Studios (PC); MacSoft (Mac)
- Designers: Bruce Shelley; Brian Reynolds
- Series: Age of Empires
- Platforms: Windows, Mac OS X
- Release: Windows: NA: October 23, 2007; EU: November 2, 2007; macOS: NA: August 5, 2008; EU: August 24, 2008
- Genre: Real-time strategy
- Modes: Single-player, multiplayer

Age of Empires III: The Asian Dynasties is the second expansion pack for the real-time strategy video game Age of Empires III developed through a collaboration between Ensemble Studios and Big Huge Games, and published by Microsoft Game Studios. The Mac version was ported over, developed and published by Destineer's MacSoft. The game is the second expansion pack following The WarChiefs. The game introduces three new civilizations; China, Japan, and India. It also introduced minor people, campaigns, maps, and game modes.

Age of Empires III: The Asian Dynasties for PC was released in North America on October 23, 2007. The Mac version was released on August 5, 2008. The game was generally received well by critics, mostly praising graphics, and sometimes criticizing predictable aspects of the game. It earned a 79% score on GameRankings and an 81% on Metacritic.

A mobile game of the same name was released in 2010 for J2ME. It is a sequel to the 2007 mobile game Age of Empires III.

== Gameplay ==
The gameplay of The Asian Dynasties followed a similar format to the original game, Age of Empires III. Rather than introduce new methods of gameplay, most changes were focused on introducing new content to the game.

One new addition is "export." Export is a special resource, only available to the three Asian civilizations, and is used to hire foreign troops and research technologies from the consulate, where the player can choose a foreign ally or, for the Japanese, isolationism. Export is generated automatically when the villagers are gathering, but its gather rate is much slower than other resources, making it challenging to afford a large foreign army. Export Rate / Experience points are also generated by other means (like sacred cows for Indians) and are specific to each civilization.

=== Civilizations ===
Three new civilizations were added in The Asian Dynasties. Each Asian civilization has monks, instead of explorers as in previous games. These monks have the ability of 'Stun' instead of 'Sharpshooter Attack' (as for European powers) or 'Nature Friendship' (as in the War Chiefs).

There are six new native civilizations available for hire in The Asian Dynasties. They are the Sufis, the Shaolin, the Zen, the Udasi, the Bhakti, and the Jesuits.

- India – This civilization has no villager cards at the Home City, but they receive one villager with almost every shipment. All villagers that are not shipped from the Home City cost wood instead of food (although this can be reversed with an unlockable Home City card). Villagers are also not allowed to harvest livestock for food, but instead can build a structure called a Sacred Field which generates experience points whenever livestock are tasked to it. Sepoys (Musketeers), Gurkha (Skirmishers) and Rajputs (much like Rodeleros) are the primary infantry units, and India has several types of camel cavalry and war elephants. Both of India's Brahmin monks ride atop elephants and can heal other units from the start of the game. Their Home City is Delhi and their leader is Akbar the Great.
- China – The Chinese get only one explorer (a Shaolin monk) along with a weak disciple at the start of the game. Chinese monks and disciples have the ability to occasionally land critical hits, doing extra damage. The Chinese monk is the only Asian hero who can train military units (disciples) during the Discovery Age and has the largest number of attack points compared to any other monk or explorer. The Chinese monk also has the unique ability to convert enemy units defeated by him into disciples, although the chances are low. The Chinese have a higher population limit than all the other civilizations; up to 220 population points, rather than the usual 200. However, to reach this cap, several upgrades must be made. Additionally, their military units are trained in blocks, much like the Russians, except that each block is made up by several types of troops, meaning when the player creates a "block" they receive a technically combat-ready force. The Chinese build villages rather than houses or shrines. Villages can garrison villagers and livestock given to them tasked to fatten more quickly. These villages also supply 20 population. Their Home City is Beijing and their leader is the Kangxi Emperor.
- Japan – This civilization has the Daimyō and Shogun units, who can train troops like a military building. Japanese villagers cannot gather food via herding or hunting, but can build shrines near huntable and herdable animals to gain a slow trickle of food, wood, or coin (or experience once a certain shipment is sent from the Home City). The shrines also act as houses, supporting 10 population units. They have the unique ability to ship most cards twice. Their starting explorers are two Ikkō-ikki archer monks that can be improved with extra attributes (via shipment cards or upgrades at the Monastery). The monks start off with an ability called "Divine Strike" which can be used to finish off guardians or enemy units with less health. Japanese monks also have the ability to build shrines, which allows villagers to focus on gathering resources and building other structures. Their Home City is Edo and their leader is Tokugawa Ieyasu.

=== Campaigns ===
There are three new campaigns, one for each new civilization. Furthermore, these campaigns return to the historical, civilization-based single-player campaigns, which are different from the past campaigns in the Age of Empires III series. Each campaign consists of five new scenarios. They are the first campaigns in the Age of Empires III series to not revolve around the fictional Black family.

- Japanese campaign – The Japanese campaign focuses on the unification of Japan (the beginning of which was also a scenario in Age of Empires II: The Conquerors), the establishment of the Tokugawa shogunate, which players control, and a young general named Sakuma Kichiro. When Kichiro was a baby, Tokugawa Ieyasu rescued him from the ruins of his conquered village and raised him as his adopted son. The campaign begins when Kichiro meets up with Daimyō Torii Mototada, at the siege of Osaka (transported from 1615 to 1600) to capture the 5-year-old heir of Hideyoshi. Kichiro and Mototada ally with the local villagers and storm the castle. Next, they move to the north-east of Honshu to destroy any villages that might support Tokugawa's enemy, Uesugi Kagekatsu and defeat Uesugi's army. After a victory despite heavy losses, Mototada learns that Tokugawa's main enemy, Ishida Mitsunari, is threatening Mototada's estate at Fushimi, forcing Mototada to return there. Meanwhile, Kichiro marches his exhausted army west again to take control of the Tokaido Road trade route. In the aftermath of the battle there, a defeated samurai of the Oda clan tells Kichiro that Tokugawa has lied to him since his childhood. Angered, Kichiro kills the samurai but is shaken by his words. He returns to Mototada at Fushimi, and asks him the truth of his origins. Mototada replies that while Tokugawa destroyed his village when he was a baby and sentenced his parents to death, he presses Kichiro on obeying the samurai code, telling how Tokugawa admired Kichiro's skills since he was a boy and has great faith in him to help him in unifying Japan. Kichiro remains loyal to Tokugawa and helps Mototada at ensuing battle at Fushimi. After Kichiro escorts the non-combatants to safety, he is forced to leave Mototada to fight alone. As the enemy breaches the final defenses, Mototada commits seppuku. Kichiro joins Tokugawa at Sekigahara. After the Battle of Sekigahara ends in victory for them, Tokugawa tells how it was a great achievement for him to become the Shogun and further asks Kichiro, what did he, as a general, gain from it. Kichiro says "the truth" and makes no mention of what he had learnt about his past. The story concludes by showing Kichiro riding his horse alone with a voiceover from Mototada on the importance of loyalty to one's master.
- Chinese campaign – The Chinese campaign focuses loosely on the 1421 hypothesis and is about a Chinese treasure ship discovering the New World before Christopher Columbus. The protagonist is Jian Huang, a Ming captain who has long dreamed of seeing the outside world, and his partner and new friend, Lao Chen, a crude and brawny but kind sailor, who are given orders to help expand the Ming Empire. In the initial release of the game, the player's emblems and unit models are representative of the Qing Empire, despite being set in the Ming period. In the beginning, the treasure fleet is attacked by Wokou pirates while still under construction. On orders of the spoiled and selfish Admiral Jinhai, nephew of the unnamed emperor, Huang and Chen save the fleet and eliminate the pirates. The fleet then embarks westward and lands in a port on the coast of India. Many of the crew, including Huang and Chen, are attacked by soldiers of the Indian Zamorin and flee with part of the fleet to a nearby island, where they set up a new base and mount a rescue mission to save Jinhai and the remaining crew, who have been captured by the Zamorin's troops and some Chinese defectors. The fleet continues west at Jinhai's insistence, although many ships turn back, and eventually are cast ashore in the Yucatán by a storm. Chen and Huang go to rescue the other ships' crews from hostile Aztec soldiers. When they return, they find that Jinhai has disappeared. Huang suspects that he was captured along with many of the fleet's crews and sets out to rescue them. Huang and Chen cut through the jungle and rescue many of their comrades, but Jinhai is not among them. Huang's small army of sailors then enters a nearby Aztec city, where they learn that Jinhai has set himself up as an emperor or perhaps a god among the Aztecs and had previously plotted with the Zamorin in India. Huang and Chen escape an ambush by Jinhai's soldiers and flee back to the coast through a series of caves, rescuing more of their crew along the way. Once back at the coast, they set up a base and counterattack, defeating and killing Jinhai. After the battle, Huang, Chen, and the surviving crew members scour the beaches for all evidence of their presence and sail home to China, hoping that no one will ever know they were there.
- Indian campaign – The Indian campaign is about the Indian Rebellion of 1857 and deals with a situation very similar to Chayton Black's situation in The Warchiefs campaign: "Shadow". The protagonist is Subedar Nanib Sahir (a portmanteau name of Nana Sahib), a member of the Sepoy regiments who served the British East India Company, who slowly becomes disillusioned by its cruel ways and abuse of Indian citizens. The campaign begins with Nanib and his superior, Colonel George Edwardson, regaining British control of the saltpetre trade in the Punjab. Nanib and Edwardson then march south to Calcutta and defeat the roving bands of arsonists there. At the close of the battle, Nanib convinces a group of arsonists to lay down their weapons and leave, but Edwardson's men ambush and massacre them, leaving Nanib visibly shaken. The conflict of Nanib's loyalty comes to a head when he and his men are ordered by the Colonel Edwardson to use new Enfield Rifles despite the cartridges' greasing with beef tallow and pork fat, which is a taboo to the sepoys' Hindu and Muslim beliefs. Nanib uses one of the rifles to fire a near miss at Edwardson (loosely based on a similar incident involving Mangal Pandey), killing one of his soldiers. Nanib and fellow sepoy Pravar Patel then lead their regiment of sepoy in an attack on the local Company fort by assaulting weapon caches to cause fires and explosions under its foundations. After their victory, Nanib and Pravar quickly rally the local citizens and sepoys, raising enormous forces. Although Nanib denies leadership of the revolt, he and Pravar decide to rescue Bahadur Shah II from British captivity when the Shah declares himself supreme ruler of India. They sneak into Delhi in the dead of night and destroy weapon caches to cause elephant stampedes, which destroy various city gates. Along the way, they find more rebels who help them battle through Delhi, freeing the Shah and escaping into the night. Nanib subsequently leads his forces in an assault on a Company fort in Shimla commanded by Colonel Edwardson. Nanib destroys or captures the saltpetre sites and plantations supplying Edwardson's forces inside the fort and fends off three counterattacks. Finally, he assaults the fort and captures its outer defenses, including the fixed guns, mortally wounding Edwardson in the process before destroying the fort's command post. When the heat of battle fades, Nanib approaches a dying Edwardson, who threatens and curses the Indians, saying that the company is a much larger and more powerful force than all of India. Nanib replies by explaining that no military force can kill the Indians' passion for their country. After Edwardson dies, Nanib and Pravar leave to prepare for continued war with the company, and three rebel sepoys are seen lowering the company's flag from the nearby flagpost.

=== Wonders ===
An Age of Empires III: The Asian Dynasties screenshot, featuring the Indian Agra Fort wonder

In The Asian Dynasties, the three new civilizations must build a Wonder to advance from age to age, instead of advancing from the Town Center. Unlike previous Age of Empires games, the player does not achieve victory by building a wonder. Players can choose from a selection of wonders, each having benefits unique to their civilization. Once built, this wonder provides an initial bonus of units or resources, while continuing to provide a benefit to the player's civilization. This initial bonus becomes larger, depending on which age is being advanced to. Since the wonder is a building, players can assign different numbers of villagers to build it, which affects the speed of advancement. Wonders that are destroyed cannot be rebuilt.

== Development ==
In developing The Asian Dynasties, Ensemble Studios worked with Big Huge Games for the first time. This partnership came about as a result of Ensemble Studios being busy with other projects including Halo Wars, and Big Huge Games' real-time strategy team with spare time on their hands. Several Big Huge Games employees, including Brian Reynolds, had declared they were fans of the Age of Empires series, and thus they asked Ensemble Studios if the two could work together on the upcoming expansion. The two studios did large amounts of communication through the internet, and Reynolds says the entire process worked well. Ensemble Studios took the role of the "customer" in their relationship with Big Huge Games, and thus the game was designed to satisfy Ensemble's needs. Ensemble designers Greg Street and Sandy Petersen were also heavily involved in brainstorming and developing the game.

As part of The Asian Dynasties launch, Dynasties Fan Site Kit was announced on September 25, 2007.

A demo version of The Asian Dynasties was released on October 4, 2007. The demo featured the Japanese civilization, the Honshū random map, and the Supremacy game mode.

== Reception ==
Reception

Aggregate scores
Aggregator	Score
GameRankings	79%
Metacritic	81%

Review scores
Publication	Score
GameSpot	7.5/10
GameSpy	4.5/5
IGN	8.0/10

Age of Empires III: The Asian Dynasties was received positively by reviewers, with an average score of approximately 80%. This was similar to the reception of Age of Empires III.

IGN praised the graphics in Age of Empires III: The Asian Dynasties, noting the graphics engine used in the game was strong enough to support the game; able to "render high-level battlefield action and ground-level cinematics easily". GameSpot agreed, approving of the added "visual pizzazz" in the form of Wonders, buildings and units. The greatest praise came from GameSpy, though; reviewer Tom Chick described the "gorgeous pagodas, arches, minarets and colors" as "a rare and generous package of new visuals". IGN called the game's voice acting "great", also praising the "livelike" sounds of the characters. GameSpot disagreed, complaining that the audio was overly similar to past games in the series.

The gameplay generally received praise from reviewers, with some caveats. While IGN's Steve Butts "loved" the game's new units and operations, he complained of a predictability in the missions, asking for more surprises. GameSpot's Jason Ocampo agreed, noting that the "campaigns feature familiar plot twists", while praising the "new twists" on the Age of Empires series-style gameplay. GameSpy noted that some of the changes were well overdue. However, the gameplay was given a big ticket, with the hypothetical question posed: "Ever play an expansion or sequel and then realize you can never go back to its predecessor because you've been spoiled by the new?"
