= Age of Empires III: The WarChiefs =

2006 expansion pack to the real-time strategy video game "Age of Empires III"

- Developers: Ensemble Studios (original); MacSoft (port and updates); Robot Entertainment (updates)
- Publishers: Microsoft Game Studios (PC); MacSoft (Mac)
- Series: Age of Empires
- Platforms: Microsoft Windows, Mac OS X
- Release: Windows: NA: October 17, 2006; EU: October 20, 2006; macOS: NA: June 13, 2007; EU: June 25, 2007
- Genre: Real-time strategy
- Modes: Single-player, multiplayer

Age of Empires III: The WarChiefs is the first expansion pack for the real-time strategy game Age of Empires III. It was released on October 17, 2006 in the United States. The expansion pack was bundled with the full game of Age of Empires III, called Age of Empires III Gold Edition on October 23, 2007. The Mac version was ported over, developed and published by Destineer's MacSoft. The full game for Mac was released on June 12, 2007 in the United States. It was followed by a second expansion pack to the original game called Age of Empires III: The Asian Dynasties.

== Gameplay changes ==
There are no major changes to the mechanics to Age of Empires III – players are still expected to gather resources, build armies and send them to attack opponents. Instead, there are a number of new concepts introduced, whilst existing concepts have been expanded.

While the Aztecs have a home city, the Iroquois and Sioux have five members of the Tribal Council: the Chief, the War Leader, the Shaman, the Wise Woman, and the Messenger. They all offer different units, supports, and improvements. The tribal council is present in the game when a native civilization advances in age (replacing the politician system of the European civilizations); the player can select to promote a candidate to the Tribal Council and this confers a bonus on the player. The candidates offer higher bonuses at later ages. Typically the type of bonus remains the same (extra units, bonus resources) and new candidates become available at higher home city levels.

Other additions to the game include new minor native tribes: the expansion increases the original game's 12 tribes to 16. The Huron replaced the Iroquois, the Cheyenne replaced the Lakota (Sioux) and the Zapotec replaced the Aztec. Other new tribes include the Klamath, the Apache, the Navajo and the Mapuche.

A Fire Pit is available to all Native civilizations. By tasking villagers to dance at the Pit, a range of up to ten dances per civilization are available. The dances can be learned through Home City shipments are The Town Dance which improves building HP and attack, and the Water Dance which improves naval combat.

The Iroquois have the unique Founder Dance, which spawns new Travois, and the Earth Mother Dance, which increases maximum population. The Sioux have the Fire Dance, which increases unit damage to buildings and ships to mitigate their lack of siege weapons, and the War Song Dance, which produces free Dog Soldier cavalry. The Aztecs have the Healing Dance (all idle units automatically regenerate health) to compensate for the limit on Warrior Priests, and the Garland War Dance to spawn the free Skull Knights.

Additionally, each Native Civilization has its share of unique technologies. There is one unique technology per building except for the Sioux teepee, and the technologies' effects range from delivering shipments of resources or units to upgrading unit capabilities.

=== Revolutions ===
A sample revolution screen where the player (German civilization) decides whether to pick Simón Bolívar (Peru) or José de San Martín (Argentina), and their respective bonuses

European colonies have a new option open to them in the Industrial age; instead of advancing to the Imperial age, they can revolt from the home nation and establish their own country. The initial cost of revolting is cheaper than advancing to the Imperial age, but the nation's economy will stagnate because all settlers will turn into militia and no new ones can be built (except Coureur des Bois from a Cree Village). Resources can continue to be delivered from pre-constructed ships, tributed resources, trading posts, factories and for the Dutch, banks. A new nation may not upgrade units to the Imperial Age.

=== Stealth ===
Another new feature is the use of stealth. This enables certain units to remain undetected by most enemy units and buildings. All native civilizations have a unit that can use stealth (this cannot be activated when enemy units are nearby). For the Europeans, there are spies that can be sent from the home city or recruited from the church. Spies are particularly effective against explorers and war chiefs due to their bonus attack. They all share the stealth ability, as do other miscellaneous units (ninja, native scouts, etc.). When certain enemy soldiers are near the invisible unit, the unit will be revealed and vulnerable to attack. Stealth units also become visible when they attack.

== Plot ==
The campaign, which is 15 missions long, includes the Black family in a more historical setting. The first act, Fire, follows Nathaniel Black (John Black's son and Amelia Black's father) as he spends the family's entire fortune supporting the American Revolution. The second act, Shadow, follows Amelia Black's son, Chayton Black, and his actions in the Black Hills during Red Cloud's War (1866–1868) and the Great Sioux War (1876–1877). The home city for both acts is the Black Family Estate.

=== Act 1: Fire ===
Nathaniel Black (loosely based on Joseph Louis Cook) is the half-Iroquois son of the late John Black from Act 2 in the previous game, raised by his mother Nonahkee and his uncle Kanyenke (Ká:nien in Definitive Edition). The campaign opens as Nathaniel and Kanyenke try to discourage the Mohawk and the Seneca from fighting in the American Revolutionary War. However, they are ambushed by a group of Mohawks and head to an Oneida village nearby. From there they counter-attack and destroy an enemy Town Center, causing their enemies to flee. When Nathaniel and Kanyenke return to their village, they find that the Mohawk and a group of Hessian mercenaries led by Colonel Sven Kuechler have raided the village and captured Nonahkee. They rescue Nonahkee, but Kuechler and his main army escape, leaving the Iroquois Confederacy to dissolve. Nathaniel's village supports the colonists, and he heads to Boston where his men help defend a redoubt on Breed's Hill from the British. After George Washington takes command, a series of defeats drives the colonials back across the Delaware, where they are joined by Nathaniel. Washington leads a small force, including Nathaniel, across the Delaware, where they attack a Hessian encampment at Trenton and defeat the rearguard of the army at Princeton. This is followed by another victory at the Battles of Saratoga. However, the army is once again defeated at Brandywine and Germantown and is forced to camp for the winter at Valley Forge, where they suffer greatly from the cold. This leads Nathaniel to use most of his family's fortune to supply the army throughout the winter. At the fictional battle of Morristown, where Nathaniel seeks revenge on Kuechler, who leads an attempt to destroy the town's capitol building. Using artillery shipments from Washington, Nathaniel sneaks around the Hessian flank and relieves Morristown. Refusing to accept defeat, Kuechler joins the fight with Nathaniel and is killed. Nathaniel's daughter Amelia narrates that he also fought at Charleston, Camden, and King's Mountain. As the tide begins to turn, the French join the war and help the revolutionaries gain a victory at Yorktown, where Nathaniel helps capture several redoubts. With the Revolution won, Nathaniel returns home a poor man, having spent his family fortune on the war effort, but is memorialized as a hero after his death in 1812. During the epilogue video of the campaign, the "Old Coot" (secretly Morgan Black) from Acts 1 and 3 in the original campaign can be seen watching his great-grandson's victory at Yorktown.

=== Act 2: Shadow ===
In 1866, Chayton Black, Amelia Black's half-Lakota son whose father died when he was too young to remember, is expanding the Falcon Railroad Company westward along the Bozeman Trail but winds up in the middle of Red Cloud's War. He helps defend the wood trail from the Sioux and becomes friends with Fort Laramie's quartermaster, William "Billy" Holme, an aged American Civil War veteran. Ten years later, in 1876, Chayton returns to the west and again meets up with Holme, now a sheriff, who informs him of a gold rush in the Black Hills of Dakota. After defending many mining camps from Sioux attacks, Chayton goes to see the Sioux chief Crazy Horse and establish a peace treaty. However, Holme and some of the miners ambush the Sioux before Chayton can begin negotiations, wrecking any chance of peace. Despite the sheriff's warmongering, Chayton still sides with Holme and defends his workers as they gather wood for a new fort. However, once the fort is complete, Holme orders Chayton to destroy a Sioux village without provocation. Chayton refuses and, turning against Holme, allies with the Sioux to destroy the fort, forcing Holme to flee into the hills. Chayton then convinces the newly arrived George Armstrong Custer to give him one day to find Holme, who is the real cause of the unrest. Chayton puts on Sioux clothing and blood-red war paint and, joining with Crazy Horse, chases down Holme and corners him in a mine. Holme pulls a gun on Chayton, but Chayton is quicker on the draw and shoots Holme first, sending him stumbling into some gunpowder kegs and falling down a mineshaft to his explosive death. Chayton then tries convincing General Custer not to attack the Sioux, but Custer refuses and demands that Chayton choose sides, saying he can no longer remain neutral. Chayton agrees, bidding Custer goodbye and siding with the Sioux. He helps gather the Sioux and Cheyenne nations and fights with them at Little Bighorn. After the battle, Amelia Black narrates that she never saw her son again, but she has heard that Chayton was either killed at Wounded Knee in 1890, taking a dozen cavalrymen with him, or lived out his days in the Black Hills with his wife and children.

In Age of Empires III: Definitive Edition, Shadow is significantly revised, with Chayton and Holme having fought alongside each other in the Civil War. Chayton has stronger convictions about his Sioux ancestry, his Lakota uncle "Frank" Warbonnet, the younger brother of his late father, replaces both Amelia and Crazy Horse's roles, Holme is more openly discriminatory towards the Natives, and all Native enemies are replaced with outlaws secretly under Holme's command. Furthermore, Chayton, whose relationship with Holme frays more quickly, turns against him altogether after meeting with Frank, altering the fifth scenario so Chayton attacks Holme's fort without helping him build it first. In the end, Chayton, now wanted for treason against the US, tells Frank that he plans to leave behind both his tribe and the Falcon Company to keep everyone safe, and he disappears to go on a journey.

== Other versions ==
The WarChiefs expansion pack was bundled with Age of Empires III Complete Collection, featuring the full game of Age of Empires III, The WarChiefs, and the second released expansion The Asian Dynasties, released on September 15, 2009, in the United States.

Age of Empires III, The WarChiefs and The Asian Dynasties have been ported to Mac OS X by MacSoft.

== Reception ==
Reception

Aggregate score
| Aggregator | Score |
|---|---|
| Metacritic | 80/100 |

Review scores
| Publication | Score |
|---|---|
| 1Up.com | A |
| Eurogamer | 6/10 |
| GameSpot | 7.8/10 |
| GameSpy | 4.5/5 |
| IGN | 8.2/10 |

The WarChiefs was a runner-up for Computer Games Magazine's 2006 "Expansion of the Year" award, which ultimately went to Warhammer 40,000: Dawn of War – Dark Crusade. During the 10th Annual Interactive Achievement Awards, The WarChiefs received a nomination for "Computer Game of the Year", which was ultimately awarded to The Elder Scrolls IV: Oblivion.
