= Siege of Malta =

The Siege of Malta may refer to:

- Siege of Malta (1429), a siege by the Moors
- Siege of Malta (1565), a siege by the Ottoman Empire against the Knights Hospitaller
  - The Siege of Malta (novel), an 1832 novel by Sir Walter Scott
  - Great Siege of Malta, a 1570 heroic poem about the 1565 siege by Antonios Achelis
- Siege of Malta (1798–1800), a siege by the British and Maltese against the French
- Siege of Malta (World War II), a siege by the Axis powers

== See also ==
- Battle of Malta (disambiguation)
