= Age of Kings =

Age of Kings may refer to:

- Age of Empires II: The Age of Kings, 1999 real-time strategy video game
- Age of Empires: The Age of Kings, 2006 turn-based strategy video game
- An Age of Kings, 1960 BBC TV series of Shakespeare's English history plays
