= Kawasaki Quad Bikes =

2007 video game

- Developer: Data Design Interactive
- Publishers: EU: Data Design Interactive; NA: Bold Games
- Platform: Wii
- Release: NA: 26 October 2007; EU: 14 March 2008; AU: 1 May 2008
- Genre: Racing
- Modes: Single-player, multiplayer

Kawasaki Quad Bikes is a video game for the Wii console, developed by Data Design Interactive, a budget developer.

It was released to poor reviews; IGN gave it a 2.0/10, stating that "The controls will infuriate you, the graphics will sting your eyes, you'll turn the music off, and the unforgiving gameplay will have you reaching for the Wii power button." and Games Radar gave it a 1/5 after criticizing its controls, AI, and poor camera control.
