= Close Combat: First to Fight =

2005 video game

- Developer: Destineer
- Publishers: 2K; MacSoft (Mac OS X); Wii: NA: Destineer; PAL: OG International
- Composer: Tim Temple
- Series: Close Combat
- Platforms: Windows; Xbox; Mac OS X Wii
- Release: Xbox, Windows: NA: April 7, 2005 (Xbox); NA: April 19, 2005 (PC); EU: April 29, 2005; Mac OS X: NA: April 14, 2005; Wii: NA: January 26, 2010; PAL: September 10, 2010
- Genre: First-person shooter
- Modes: Single-player, multiplayer

Close Combat: First to Fight is a squad-based military first person tactical shooter video game created by Destineer Studios for Microsoft Windows, Mac OS X and Xbox. It was released in April 2005. The player commands a fireteam of three U.S. Marines in a realistic, fictional scenario where the United Nations sends marines into Lebanon when their prime minister falls ill and Syria and Iran send forces to bolster certain factions.

The game features a psychological model for every AI character, including enemies, civilians, and team members. No two games should play the same due to the variability of the simulated human reaction to stress.

It was designed with input from active-duty and retired marines from 3rd Battalion 1st Marines, who recently participated in combat around Fallujah, Iraq during Operation Phantom Fury that became known as the Second Battle of Fallujah.

The game was later ported to the Wii as Marines: Modern Urban Combat.

== Plot ==
In 2006, the Lebanese prime minister becomes ill, and goes overseas to receive treatment. Seeing a prime chance to control Lebanon, Syria and Iran begin supplying local militant groups. As things escalate, Marines are inserted into Beirut for the third time. The United States and NATO, acting under United Nations endorsement, sends in military forces into Lebanon. Among them is a U.S. Marine Corps lance corporal with the callsign Gladiator 2 who leads his fireteam called Charlie Team into Beirut to battle terrorists and rescue civilians and assist other Marines in battling terrorists and the invading Syrian Army, restoring order to Lebanon.

=== Enemy factions ===
- Militia: The militia are a group of former Lebanese army personnel working together with Syrian troops. They are led by Akhbar al-Soud, a former army officer and arms dealer.
- Atash Movement: The Atash movement is an organisation of extremist Islamists, supported by Iran. They are led by Tarik Qadan, a powerful Muslim cleric, who may be a puppet of the Iranian government.
- Syrian Army: The Syrian Army occupies a large part of Beirut, and is equipped with heavy weapons and APCs. They are led by General Bakr, a former Yemeni army officer and suspected terrorist.
- Iranian special forces: A small group of highly trained commandos, working with the Atash. They are led by Adullah bin Katan, an army Major and terrorist supporter.

== Development ==
The developers worked with more than 40 U.S. Marines to help make the game. Composer Tim Temple composed the game's soundtrack.

== Reception ==
Reception

Aggregate score
Aggregator	Score		
Aggregator	Macintosh	PC	Xbox
Metacritic	N/A	67/100	69/100

Review scores
Publication	Score		
Publication	Macintosh	PC	Xbox
Computer Games Magazine	N/A	4/5	N/A
Computer Gaming World	N/A	2/5	N/A
Edge	N/A	N/A	4/10
Electronic Gaming Monthly	N/A	N/A	4.83/10
Game Informer	N/A	N/A	6/10
GamePro	N/A	N/A	4/5
GameSpot	N/A	7.3/10	7.5/10
GameSpy	N/A	3/5	N/A
GameZone	N/A	7.2/10	8/10
IGN	N/A	N/A	8/10
Macworld	4.5/5	N/A	N/A
Official Xbox Magazine (US)	N/A	N/A	2.8/10
PC Gamer (US)	N/A	54%	N/A
The Sydney Morning Herald	N/A	3/5	3/5

The PC and Xbox versions received "average" reviews according to the review aggregation website Metacritic. Macworld gave the Mac version universal acclaim over a month before its release worldwide.
