= Age of Empires =

Real-time strategy video game series

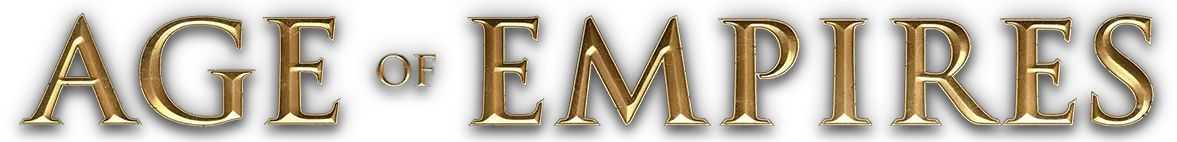
- Genre: Real-time strategy
- Developers: Ensemble Studios; Big Huge Games; Climax Studios; Forgotten Empires; Hidden Path Entertainment; Relic Entertainment; Robot Entertainment; Tantalus Media; TiMi Studio Group; World's Edge
- Publishers: Xbox Game Studios; Tencent Games
- Platforms: Microsoft Windows; Classic Mac OS; Windows Mobile; PlayStation 2; OS X; N-Gage; Nintendo DS; Windows Phone; iOS; Android; Xbox One; Xbox Series X/S; PlayStation 5
- First release: Age of Empires; October 15, 1997
- Latest release: Age of Mythology: Retold; September 4, 2024
- Spin-offs: Age of Mythology

Age of Empires is a series of historical real-time strategy video games, originally developed by Ensemble Studios and published by Xbox Game Studios.

The first title in the series, Age of Empires, focused on events in Europe, Africa, and Asia, spanning from the Stone Age to the Iron Age; the expansion game explored the formation and expansion of the Roman Empire. The sequel, Age of Empires II: The Age of Kings, was set in the Middle Ages, while its expansion focused partially on the Spanish conquest of the Aztec Empire. Age of Empires III and its two expansions explored the early modern period, when Europe was colonizing the Americas and several Asian nations were on the decline. Another installment, Age of Empires Online, takes a different approach as a free-to-play online game utilizing Games for Windows Live. A spin-off game, Age of Mythology, was set in the same period as the original Age of Empires, but focused on mythological elements of Greek, Egyptian, and Norse mythology. The fourth main installment in the series, Age of Empires IV, was released on October 28, 2021, also focusing on the Middle Ages.

The Age of Empires series has been a commercial success, selling over 25 million copies.

== Games ==
Release timeline Mainline number entries in bold
1997	**Age of Empires**
1998	Age of Empires: The Rise of Rome
1999	Age of Empires: Gold Edition
1999	**Age of Empires II: The Age of Kings**
2000	Age of Empires II: The Conquerors
2000	Age of Empires: Collector's Edition
2001	Age of Empires II: Gold Edition
2002	Age of Mythology
2003	Age of Mythology: The Titans
2003	Age of Empires: Gold Edition Pocket PC Version
2004	Age of Mythology: Gold Edition
2005	Age of Empires II Mobile
2005	**Age of Empires III**
2005	Age of Empires III: Collector's Edition
2006	Age of Empires II Deluxe Mobile
2006	Age of Empires: The Age of Kings
2006	Age of Empires III: The WarChiefs
2007	Age Of Empires III: Gold Edition
2007	Age of Empires III: The Asian Dynasties
2007	Age of Empires III Mobile
2008	Age of Empires: Mythologies
2009	Age of Empires III: Complete Collection
2010	Age of Empires III: The Asian Dynasties Mobile
2011	Age of Empires Online
2011	Age of Empires Online: Defense of Crete
2012	Age of Empires Online: Fertile Crescent
2012	Age of Empires Online: Northern Invasion
2013	Age of Empires II: HD Edition
2013	Age of Empires II HD: The Forgotten
2014	Age of Mythology: Extended Edition
2014	Age of Empires: Castle Siege
2015	Age of Empires II HD: The African Kingdoms
2015	Age of Empires: World Domination
2016	Age of Mythology: Tale of the Dragon
2016	Age of Empires II HD: Rise of the Rajas
2017
2018	Age of Empires: Definitive Edition
2019	Age of Empires II: Definitive Edition
2019	Age of Empires II: Definitive Edition - The Last Khans
2020	Age of Empires III: Definitive Edition
2021	Age of Empires II: Definitive Edition – Lords of the West
2021	Age of Empires III: Definitive Edition – United States Civilization
2021	Age of Empires III: Definitive Edition – The African Royals
2021	Age of Empires II: Definitive Edition – Dawn of the Dukes
2021	**Age of Empires IV**
2021	Age of Empires III: Definitive Edition – Mexico Civilization
2022	Age of Empires II: Definitive Edition – Dynasties of India
2022	Age of Empires III: Definitive Edition – Knights of the Mediterranean
2022	Age of Empires IV: Anniversary Edition
2023	Age of Empires II: Definitive Edition – Return of Rome
2023	Age of Empires II: Definitive Edition – The Mountain Royals
2023	Age of Empires IV: The Sultans Ascend
2024	Age of Empires II: Definitive Edition – Victors and Vanquished
2024	Age of Mythology: Retold
2024	Age of Mythology: Retold – New Gods Pack: Freyr
2024	Age of Empires Mobile
2024	Age of Empires II: Definitive Edition – Chronicles: Battle for Greece
2025	Age of Mythology: Retold – Immortal Pillars
2025	Age of Empires IV: Knights of Cross and Rose
2025	Age of Empires II: Definitive Edition – The Three Kingdoms
2025	Age of Mythology: Retold – Heavenly Spear
2025	Age of Empires II: Definitive Edition – Chronicles: Alexander the Great
2025	Age of Empires IV: Dynasties of the East
2026	Age of Empires II: Definitive Edition – The Last Chieftains
2026	Age of Mythology: Retold – New Gods Pack: Demeter
2026	Age of Mythology: Retold – Obsidian Mirror
2026	Age of Empires IV: Yue Fei's Legacy
2026	Age of Empires III: Definitive Edition – The Baltic Powers
2026	Age of Empires II: Definitive Edition – The Viking Sagas
2026	Age of Empires IV: Raiders of the North

The games in the series focus on historical events throughout time. Age of Empires covers the events between the Stone Age and the Classical period, in Europe and Asia. Its expansion, The Rise of Rome, follows the formation and rise of the Roman Empire. The Age of Kings and its Nintendo DS spin-off follow Europe and Asia through the Middle Ages. The Age of Kings' expansion pack, The Conquerors, is set during the same period, but also includes scenarios about the Spanish conquest of the Aztec Empire, El Cid, and Attila the Hun. Age of Empires III and its first expansion, The WarChiefs, take place during the European colonization of the Americas. Its second expansion, The Asian Dynasties, follows the rise of Asia in the same period. Age of Empires Online focuses on the Greek and Egyptian civilizations. The series' spin-off, Age of Mythology, and its expansion pack, The Titans, are set during the Bronze Age, but focus on mythology as their themes, rather than history.

=== Main series ===
==== Age of Empires ====
Age of Empires, released on October 15, 1997, was the first game in the series, as well as the first major release from Ensemble Studios. It was one of the first history-based real-time strategy games made, utilizing the Genie game engine. GameSpot described it as a mix of Civilization and Warcraft. The game gives players a choice of 12 civilizations to develop from the Stone Age to the Iron Age. The expansion pack, The Rise of Rome, published by Microsoft on October 31, 1998, introduced new features and four new civilizations, including the Romans. Although the two games had contained many software bugs, patches resolved many of the problems.

Age of Empires was generally well received, despite some highly negative reviews. GameSpot criticized a confused design, while Computer and Video Games praised the game as strong in single and multiplayer. The Academy of Interactive Arts & Sciences named Age of Empires the 1998 "Computer Strategy Game of the Year". For several years, the game remained high on the sales charts, with over three million units sold by 2000. The Rise of Rome sold one million units in 2000 and attained 80% as an aggregate score from GameRankings.

In June 2017, Adam Isgreen, creative director of Xbox Game Studios announced Age of Empires: Definitive Edition at the Electronic Entertainment Expo 2017. It features overhauled graphics with support for 4K resolution, a remastered soundtrack, and other gameplay improvements, and was planned to be released on October 19, 2017, but was delayed until February 20, 2018, when it was released on the Microsoft Store. On May 30, 2019, Microsoft announced that the Definitive Edition would be coming to Steam, along with the Definitive Editions of both Age of Empires II and Age of Empires III.

==== Age of Empires II ====
Age of Empires II: The Age of Kings, released on September 30, 1999, used the Genie game engine, and had gameplay similar to its predecessor. Age of Kings is set in the Middle Ages, from the Dark Ages to the Imperial Age. It allows players to choose one of 13 civilizations, from Europe, Asia, and the Middle East.

On August 24, 2000, Microsoft published the expansion, The Conquerors. It added new units and five new civilizations, including two Mesoamerican civilizations: the Maya and the Aztec. The Age of Kings was a bigger critical success than the first two games, with Game Rankings and Metacritic scores of 92%. Microsoft shipped out more than two million copies to retailers, and the game received numerous awards and accolades. Critics agreed that The Conquerors expanded well on The Age of Kings, though issues of unbalanced gameplay were raised. The Age of Kings and The Conquerors won the 2000 and 2001 "Computer Strategy Game of the Year" awards from the Academy of Interactive Arts & Sciences, respectively.

In April 2013, Age of Empires II: HD Edition was released on the Steam digital distribution platform for Windows operating systems. The HD Edition includes both the original game and the expansion The Conquerors, as well as updated graphics for high-resolution displays. Originally a fan-made modpack made for The Conquerors, Age of Empires II: The Forgotten was an unofficial expansion that added a new campaign, playable civilizations, maps, and quality of service updates. The Forgotten was later developed into an official expansion with SkyBox Labs and Forgotten Empires, and in November 2013 The Forgotten HD was released by Microsoft exclusively for the HD Edition on Steam. A third expansion named The African Kingdoms was released by Microsoft in November 2015, also exclusively for the HD Edition. A fourth expansion entitled Rise of the Rajas was released on December 19, 2016. On August 21, 2017, Microsoft announced Age of Empires II: Definitive Edition.

In June 2019, Adam Isgreen, now the Franchise Creative Director for Age of Empires, shared more information regarding the Age of Empires II: Definitive Edition at the Electronic Entertainment Expo 2019. He confirmed that the Definitive Edition was being developed by Forgotten Empires, Tantalus Media, and Wicked Witch Software. He announced that the game would feature new 4K graphics, Xbox Live support for multiplayer, exclusive achievements, four new civilizations (Bulgarians, Cumans, Lithuanians, Tatars), three new campaigns, a new spectator mode and tournament features, and additional quality of life improvements. It was released on November 14, 2019. Bert Beeckman, co-founder of Forgotten Empires, confirmed on June 12 that Age of Empires II: HD Edition would not be removed from sale after the release of Age of Empires II: Definitive Edition.

==== Age of Empires III ====
Age of Empires III was released on October 18, 2005 and was built on an improved version of the Age of Mythology game engine with the most significant changes being the updated graphics engine and the inclusion of the Havok physics middleware engine. The game is set in the period between 1421 and 1850, and players can choose one of eight European nations. The game introduced a large number of features, such as home cities. Described by Ensemble Studios as "an important support system to your efforts in the New World", home cities help provide the player with resources, equipment, troops, and upgrades. They can be used across multiple games, and upgraded after each battle; the feature was compared to a role-playing game character by Ensemble Studios. The first expansion to Age of Empires III, The WarChiefs, was released October 17, 2006. Most gameplay changes in the expansion pack were small, but it introduced three new civilizations, with a focus on Native Americans. The second expansion, The Asian Dynasties, went on sale October 23, 2007. It was a jointly developed product; Big Huge Games helped Ensemble Studios develop the game, with Brian Reynolds joining Bruce Shelley as lead designer. The game expanded the Age of Empires III universe into Asia, and introduced three new civilizations. Reception towards Age of Empires III was mixed; Game Revolution described it as "about as much fun" as a history textbook, while GameZone argued it was "one of the best looking games, much less an RTS game, that is out on the market currently". It sold more than two million copies, and won the GameSpy "real-time strategy game of the year" award. The WarChiefs failed to equal the success of its predecessor, with a lower score on both Game Rankings and Metacritic, and The Asian Dynasties' score was lower still with 80%.

Several collectors' editions of Age of Empires III included a hardcover artbook. The last page of the artbook has a pictorial depiction of the series; the Roman numerals below each panel range from I to V, indicating the series would include an Age of Empires IV and Age of Empires V. Ensemble Studios employee Sandy Petersen said that the image "was total speculation on [their] part".

In 2008, Microsoft announced they were closing down Ensemble Studios following the completion of Halo Wars. Some of its employees would form a new team as part of Microsoft Studios. Kevin Unangst, director of Games for Windows, denied it was the end of the Age of Empires series, telling The San Francisco Chronicle "we're very excited about the future potential for Age of Empires". Edge confirmed, in an interview with Microsoft's corporate vice president of interactive entertainment, Shane Kim, that Microsoft continued to own Age of Empires and that they had plans to continue the series. However, Bruce Shelley wrote in his blog that he would not be part of any new studios formed.

Following the announcement of remastered editions of previous games, Microsoft announced Age of Empires III: Definitive Edition on August 21, 2017. On May 30, 2019, the company revealed that the Definitive Edition would come to Steam in the future, along with the Definitive Editions of both Age of Empires and Age of Empires II. On August 28, 2020, Microsoft announced at Gamescom 2020 that Age of Empires III: Definitive Edition would release officially on October 15, 2020.

On January 23, 2020, Microsoft announced a closed beta for early February of that year. Betas ran on Steam and the Microsoft Store, with each beta session including a small piece of the game. The first closed beta session began on February 11, 2020, and ended on February 19, 2020. The second closed multiplayer session began on March 31 and ran until April 7. The game was released on October 15, 2020.

==== Age of Empires IV ====
On August 21, 2017, Microsoft announced Age of Empires IV, developed by Relic Entertainment. The title was officially released on October 28, 2021, with eight civilizations available at launch: the Abbasid Dynasty, the Chinese, the Delhi Sultanate, the English, the French, the Holy Roman Empire, the Mongols, and the Rus. The game is set during the Early Middle Ages to the early Renaissance, with the earliest appearance of any civilization being in the year 750. The game features four Ages, the same as those in Age of Empires II — Dark Age, Feudal Age, Castle Age, and Imperial Age. This title incorporates several features and mechanics of Age of Empires II that were changed or removed in Age of Empires III.

Like other Age of Empires games, Age of Empires IV has received several new civilizations in updates. Recent updates have added the Ottomans, Malians, Byzantines, and Japanese, along with several variants of civilizations already in the game: the Ayyubids, Jeanne d'Arc, Order of the Dragon, and Zhu Xi's Legacy, for a total of 16 civilizations at present.

=== Spin-off games ===
Age of Mythology shared many elements of gameplay with the main series, and was considered a part of the series, despite its different focus. The campaign in Age of Mythology tells the story of an Atlantean, Arkantos, and his quest to find why his people are out of favor with Poseidon. Microsoft published the game on October 30, 2002, and its expansion, The Titans, on October 21, 2003. The Titans featured the Atlanteans as a new civilization. Its campaign is shorter than previous expansions, and centers on Kastor, son of Arkantos, who falls for the lies of the titans and frees them from Tartarus. Age of Mythology sold more than one million units in four months. It scored 89% on Game Rankings and Metacritic. The Titans failed to equal the sales success of Age of Mythology, although critics rated it highly.

Backbone Entertainment developed Age of Empires: The Age of Kings as a turn-based game for the Nintendo DS. Majesco published the game on February 14, 2006. It is similar to other turn-based games, such as Advance Wars, but with a gameplay based on its PC counterpart. Age of Empires: The Age of Kings scored 80% on Game Rankings and Metacritic. Konami brought a game of the same title to the PlayStation 2 around five years earlier than the DS version, but the game had little promotion, and sold poorly.

On August 16, 2010, Microsoft announced Age of Empires Online, which was a free-to-play Games for Windows Live online game, it developed in collaboration with Robot Entertainment. It featured Free-to-play experiences via Games for Windows LIVE as well as: A persistent online capital city that lives and grows even when you're offline, Cooperative multiplayer quests, trading and a level-based system that lets you progress at your own pace. Premium content could be earned or purchased, such as access to blueprints and special items, as well as more quests and features. In September 2013, it was announced that the game would remain functional until July 1, 2014, after which it would be shut down due to the content being too expensive to maintain.

On August 25, 2014, Age of Empires: Castle Siege was announced. It is a touch-based game developed by Smoking Gun Interactive. It was released on September 17, 2014, for the Windows PC and Windows Phone 8.

On April 13, 2014, Age of Empires: World Domination was announced. It was developed by KLab Games for the iOS, Android and Windows Phone. It was released on December 7, 2015, with the service terminated on November 30, 2016.

On October 25, 2022, a new mobile entry called Age of Empires Mobile was announced. A free-to-play game developed by TiMi Studio Group, the game was released on Android and iOS on October 17, 2024.

== Development ==
=== Historical elements ===
The development phases of the Age of Empires games were similar in several ways. Due to the games being based on historical events, the team often had to do large amounts of research. However, the research was not in depth, which, according to Age of Empires designer Bruce Shelley, is "a good idea for most entertainment products". Shelley also said that Ensemble Studios took most of the reference material from children's sections at libraries. He pointed out the goal was for the players of the game to have fun, "not [its] designers or researchers". At the Games Convention Developers Conference in 2007, Shelley continued with this thought and explained that the success of the series laid in "making a game which appealed to both the casual and hardcore gamer". Shelley also remarked the Age of Empires games were not about history in itself, but rather "about the human experience;" they focused not simply on what humans had done but on what they could do in the future such as "going into space". Ensemble Studios developed Age of Mythology in a different way than the previous two games. The team had worried they "couldn't get away" with a third historical-based game, and chose mythology as the setting after they had discussed several options.

=== Artificial intelligence ===
The artificial intelligence (AI) used in the Age of Empires series has been developed and improved regularly by designers. AI specialist Dave Pottinger noted the development team gave the AI in the original game a very high priority, and spent over a year working on it. He said that the AI in the game relies on tactics and strategies to win, instead of "cheating" by giving bonus resources to itself, or tweaking its units to be stronger than normal. Pottinger later noted that the Age of Empires series team took great pride in their AI playing a "fair game" and didn't know what the player was doing and had to play by the same rules as its human opponents.

Age of Empires allows players to choose to play either along specialized, story-backed conditions or as individual battles against the AI (and other players). Choosing to battle against the AI – rather than following the storyline – allows the AI to adapt to players' strategies and even remember which games it won and lost. The AI eventually overcomes players' strategies and easily destroys their villages after several games. For instance, in Age of Empires III, this is referred to as playing a "Skirmish". However, Age of Empires III allows players to refine their strategies further against the AI by "building a Deck", which allows players to replace "Home City" shipments with improved alternatives.

In Age of Empires II: The Conquerors the AI was given a high priority, the result being the "smart villager" feature, which was included in subsequent games of the series. After building a structure that stores or produces resources, smart villagers would proceed to collect resources related to the structure, such as crops from farms or ore from exposed deposits.

Age of Mythology: The Titans lets players use an AI debugger when creating custom scenarios; players can change the settings of computer players and make them act according to certain patterns. More basic changes to the AI had previously been available in the series' first two games.

=== Graphics and visuals ===
The graphics and visuals of Age of Empires improved with each successive release. From the original release to the second, Age of Empires II: The Age of Kings, noteworthy improvements gained praise from several critics. With the release of Age of Mythology the praise continued, and the fourth release, Age of Empires III, garnered even more.

GameSpot praised the improved graphics in the second release, Age of Empires II: The Age of Kings. Eurogamer welcomed its introduction of female villagers as compared with the original male only version. Allgame praised the advanced grouping and path-finding systems in the second release. Despite the improved graphics, Allgame complained that units in Age of Empires II: The Age of Kings were at times difficult to distinguish from one another, a point numerous reviewers agreed on. Nevertheless, Game Revolution wrote that the second release was "the best looking of the 2D RTS games out there right now".

The graphics continued to improve in Age of Mythology and was praised by a majority of reviewers. IGN ranked the graphics in this third release "a joy to watch ... awesome". GameSpot agreed, also rating the graphics nine out of ten. Game Revolution also agreed, and PC Gamer stated that the graphics in the third release "are packed with detail".

The trend in improved graphics continued well into the next release, Age of Empires III, much to the delight of reviewers. IGN stated: "After seeing the screenshots, our jaws hit the floor at the amount of detail." 1UP.com described Age of Empires III as "one of the most beautiful games you will put on your computer for the foreseeable future". GameSpy agreed, stating: "Age III's graphics are unmatched in the strategy genre." Age of Empires III builds on and introduces new features to the prior release, Age of Mythology, such as the inclusion of the award-winning Havok physics simulation middleware game engine for the Windows version and PhysX for the Mac OS X. The innovative result is that pre-created animations are avoided; instead events are calculated according to the physics engine. Consequently, views of events like building destruction and tree felling are not pre-recorded. GameSpot also admired the graphics in the fourth release but complained about "the awkward unit behavior". Other graphical features of the game include bloom lighting and support for pixel shader 3.0.

GameSpy awarded Age of Empires III the "Best Graphics" award at GameSpy's "Game of the Year 2005".

=== Music ===
Stephen Rippy has been the series' music director since the first game. He has had occasional help from his brother, David Rippy, as well as Kevin McMullan. He created the original music in Age of Empires with sounds of instruments from the periods in the game. These sounds came from actual instruments, and their digital samples. The tunes were the result of extensive research on the cultures, styles, and instruments used. Rippy said that sound development on The Age of Kings was easy, since there was knowledge of the instruments used in the Middle Ages. Therefore, they were able to reproduce the tunes for the soundtrack of the game. In Age of Mythology, an orchestral instrumentation was used, instead. According to McMullan, the team also collected large numbers of audio recordings from zoos, and created "a massive sound library of [their] own material". The music of Age of Empires III was similar to The Age of Kings, in which the team used more historical instruments; Rippy noted the team used instruments such as "bagpipes and field drums" to give it a realistic feel.

=== Collaboration ===
Ensemble Studios worked together with Big Huge Games to develop The Asian Dynasties, Age of Empires III's second expansion. This was the first joint venture for both teams. The reason for them doing so was compatible schedules: Ensemble Studios was busy with other projects—particularly Halo Wars—while Big Huge Games' real-time strategy team had few projects at that time. Big Huge Games did most of the work, but Ensemble Studios designers Greg Street and Sandy Petersen joined in the brainstorming, and had control over the final product. Both studios had roles in testing the game before its release.

== Reception and legacy ==
Aggregate review scores As of December 31, 2019.
Game	GameRankings	Metacritic
Age of Empires (1997)	87%	83
Age of Empires: The Rise of Rome (1998)	80%	–
Age of Empires II: The Age of Kings (1999)	92%	92
Age of Empires II: The Conquerors (2000)	89%	88
Age of Empires III (2005)	82%	81
Age of Empires: The Age of Kings (2006) (Nintendo DS)	80%	80
Age of Empires III: The WarChiefs (2006)	81%	81
Age of Empires III: The Asian Dynasties (2007)	80%	80
Age of Empires Online (2011)	71%	70
Age of Empires II: HD Edition (2013)	71%	68
Age of Empires: Castle Siege (2014)	40%	–
Age of Empires: Definitive Edition (2018)	65%	69
Age of Empires II: Definitive Edition (2019)	69%	81
Age of Mythology (2002)	89%	89
Age of Mythology: The Titans (2003)	83%	84
Age of Empires: Mythologies (2008) (Nintendo DS)	79%	78
Age of Mythology: Extended Edition (2014)	69%	66

The Age of Empires series has been a commercial success. As of 2008, five of its games have each sold more than one million copies. According to Gamasutra, Age of Empires had sold more than three million copies, and The Rise of Rome sold one million copies as of 2000. Around the same time, Microsoft announced that they shipped over two million copies of The Age of Kings. In 2003, Microsoft announced the sales of one million copies for Age of Mythology. By 2004, prior to the release of Age of Empires III, the Age of Empires franchise had sold over 15 million copies. On May 18, 2007, Ensemble Studios announced that two million copies of Age of Empires III had been sold. Games in the series have consistently scored highly on video game review aggregator websites GameRankings and Metacritic, which collect data from numerous review websites. As noted in the adjacent table, the highest rating game is Age of Empires II: The Age of Kings, receiving a 92% score from both sites.

Critics have credited Age of Empires for influencing real-time strategy (RTS) games such as Rise of Nations, Empire Earth, and Cossacks. Star Wars: Galactic Battlegrounds was also influenced by the series: it utilized the Genie game engine, as Age of Empires and Age of Empires II: The Age of Kings had, and was considered by critics to be a very close replica to the games; IGN began their review with the statement "I love Age of Star Wars, I mean Star Empires. Whatever it's called, I dig it." and GameSpot wrote that "fundamentals of the Age of Empires II engine are so intact in Star Wars: Galactic Battlegrounds that veterans of that game can jump right in". In October 2005, Shelley commented on the impact of the series. In a GameSpy interview, he explained that parents would "tell Ensemble Studios that their kid is reading books about ancient Greece because they enjoy playing with the triremes so much, or that they want to check out books about medieval history because [the] game taught them what a trebuchet was".

Shelley has said that the key to the success of the games was its innovation, rather than imitation of its peers. He also claimed the unique elements in the games "helped establish the reputation of Ensemble Studios as masters of the real-time strategy genre". Mark Bozon of IGN wrote in his review of The Age of Kings, "The Age of Empires series has been one of the most innovative real-time strategy games for PC in the last decade or so." Gamenikki called Ensemble Studios "the developer that started it all" when they talked about how much Age of Empires III had done to advance the real-time strategy genre. Shelley has acknowledged the success and innovation of Age of Empires helped to ensure Ensemble survive its early periods since startup. In 2005, Shelley complained of critics holding an "innovation bias" against the series; citing the 60% score from Computer Gaming World, he said that despite Age of Empires III being "perhaps the best selling PC game in the world" at the time, reviewers expected "something really new" and rated it harshly.

Bungie chose Ensemble Studios to develop Halo Wars, an RTS game based on their Halo series. They said that one of the reasons they chose to work with Ensemble was because of the Age of Empires series. They also noted that Ensemble was the perfect choice "to realize the original vision of Halo", which started life as an RTS.

In 2024, the Red Bull Wololo: El Reinado Age of Empires II tournament achieved the second-highest viewership in the game's history, with a peak of 85,800 concurrent viewers. The event, held at the Castle of Almodóvar, Spain, featured eight top players, including TheViper and Hera, who won the final 5-1. This marked a 12% increase in peak viewership compared to the previous series, reflecting the growing popularity of Age of Empires II in the esports scene.

According to estimates from mobile-market analytics firm AppMagic, Age of Empires Mobile generated approximately US$56.4 million in player in-app-purchase spending during 2025. The United States was estimated to be its largest market, accounting for US$17.8 million, followed by China, South Korea, Germany and the United Kingdom. MobileGamer.biz noted that Tencent, which operates the game, would likely receive most of this revenue.
