= Age of Empires: Mythologies =

2008 video game

- Developer: Griptonite Games
- Publisher: THQ
- Designer: Ensemble Studios
- Platform: Nintendo DS
- Release: NA: November 24, 2008; EU: February 6, 2009; AU: December 5, 2008
- Genre: Turn-based strategy
- Modes: Single-player, multiplayer

Age of Empires: Mythologies is a turn-based strategy video game for the Nintendo DS based on Age of Mythology. It is the sequel to Age of Empires: The Age of Kings.

== Gameplay ==
Unlike the original Age of Mythology for the PC, Age of Empires: Mythologies is turn-based as opposed to real-time strategy, where in the vein of Advance Wars and the previous Age of Empires: The Age of Kings, each player is given a turn where their units can make single actions within that turn such as moving to an opposing unit and attacking or capturing or constructing buildings. Every time two rival players' units attack one another, a brief animation of a group of each unit engaging in combat is played on the top screen, along with the resulting damage to their hit points. In standard games, players collect three resources – food, gold and favor – to construct buildings and eventually train units for combat. To gain further units, technologies and buildings, players advance "Ages", starting in the Archaic Age, a feature prominently used in the Age of Empires series.

Like the original Age of Mythology, there are three civilizations available – Greek, Egyptian and Norse – each with their own unique units, buildings, powers and method of obtaining favor. Each has three "major gods" to choose from before each game – Zeus, Hades and Poseidon for the Greeks; Ra, Isis and Set for the Egyptians, and Odin, Thor and Loki for the Norse. Additionally, each has "minor gods" to select from every time the player advances an age, with all deities granting the player unique technologies, perks, myth units and God powers that are used to damage or benefit players. There are three types of base unit – humans, heroes and myth units, the latter two being mythical figures or creatures from the historical civilization's mythology and legends. A rock-paper-scissors model governs which units are best suited against others; for example, humans are good against heroes but weak against myth units. Every unit also has a sub-category such as heavy infantry or archers, again with each being better suited against certain others. Human units include hoplites or chariot archers, heroes include Odysseus and Ramesses, and myth units include Cyclopes and giants.

== Reception ==
Reception

Aggregate score
Aggregator	Score
Metacritic	78/100

Review scores
Publication	Score
GameSpot	8.6/10
GamesRadar+	3/5
IGN	8.6/10
Nintendo World Report	9/10
Pocket Gamer	4/5

Mark Bozon of IGN called the game "one of the most robust, rewarding, and entertaining strategy games on DS".

The Independent called Age of Empires: Mythologies as "Elegant and absorbing" and added that it's "an excellent handheld adventure".
