= Little Red Riding Hood's Zombie BBQ =

2007 video game

- Developers: EnjoyUp; Gammick Entertainment
- Publishers: NA: Destineer; EU: Gammick Entertainment
- Producer: George Fan
- Designer: Jose M. Iñiguez
- Artist: Ikari Studio
- Platforms: Nintendo DS, Nintendo DSi (DSiWare)
- Release: NA: October 31, 2008 (DS); EU: October 31, 2008 (DSiWare); NA: December 13, 2010 (DSiWare)
- Genres: Action, shooter
- Mode: Single-player

Little Red Riding Hood's Zombie BBQ is an action rail shooter game for the Nintendo DS. It was published in North America by Destineer, produced and designed by Gammick Entertainment, and developed by Spanish studio EnjoyUp. The game was released as a DSiWare title in Europe. Like its title suggests, players take the role of Little Red Riding Hood as she destroys zombies with a variety of high-powered firearms.

== Gameplay ==
The game is a top-scrolling rail shooter where the player may move left and right into one of seven spaces. Touching the character will cause them to crouch, while using the stylus to aim. Players may choose to be either Little Red Riding Hood, who specializes in guns, or Momotarō, who specializes in ninja stars, although the difference is merely aesthetic. The action of the game consists entirely of shooting and dodging incoming attacks with increasingly difficult obstacles as the game progresses.

== Plot ==
The main characters of Little Red Riding Hood's Zombie BBQ

The game takes place in Storyland with areas representing a number of classic fairy tales, such as The Adventures of Pinocchio and the Three Little Pigs. Little Red Riding Hood and Momotarō are the two playable characters. Little "READY TO ROCK" Riding Hood grew up in the forest, spending her time visiting her grandmother and hunting for food. She loves automatic firearms, citing "collecting weapons" as one of her hobbies. Momotarō is Little Red Riding Hood's friend, who was born from a giant peach. He has had over one thousand and one adventures—including fighting off demons, finding lost treasures, and repelling threats from the underworld.

Little Red Riding Hood finds that something has gone wrong with Storyland soon after saving her grandmother from another wolf attack. Along with Momotarō, she decides to fight through the invading armies of zombies to find the source of the plague and destroy it.

== Development ==
Little Red Riding Hood's Zombie BBQ was Spanish developer EnjoyUp's second game. To promote the game, they collaborated with Destructoid to hold a dress up contest with a copy of the game and a signed promotional poster as prizes. The contest ended September 2, 2008.

== Reception ==
Reception

Aggregate score
Aggregator	Score
Metacritic	68/100

Review scores
Publication	Score
1Up.com	C−
GameSpot	5.5/10
GameZone	8.4/10
IGN	8.6/10
Nintendo Life	8/10
Nintendo Power	5/10
Nintendo World Report	7/10

The game received "average" reviews according to the review aggregation website Metacritic.

IGN listed the game as number six in their feature "The Top 25 DS Games Under $20", being the first game on the list to have a sub-$20 initial retail price. It was a nominee for Best Shooting Game by IGN in their 2008 video game awards. GameSpot was not as impressed, citing poor controls, slowdown and cheap hits. Nintendo Life said that while the game may be a simplistic shooter it offers plenty of depth.
