= WordJong =

2007 video game

- Developers: Gameblend Studios; Magellan Interactive
- Publishers: Destineer (US); Funbox Media
- Platform: Nintendo DS
- Release: NA: November 16, 2007; EU: September 17, 2010; AU: September 30, 2010
- Genre: Puzzle
- Modes: Single-player, multiplayer

WordJong is a puzzle video game developed by American teams Gameblend Studios and Magellan Interactive and published by Destineer for the Nintendo DS. The gameplay of WordJong combines the elements of Mahjong and Scrabble. WordJong was then released in Europe on September 17, 2010, and in Australia on September 30, 2010, which was published by Funbox Media.

== Gameplay ==
WordJong is a puzzle game. The game uses an achievement system quite similar to Xbox Live, featuring 39 possible medallions that the player can earn. WordJong consists of a dictionary with more than 100,000 words. The goal is to clear the board and use all of the tiles provided in the game.

== Reception ==
Reception

Aggregate scores
Aggregator	Score
GameRankings	75.33% (9 reviews)
Metacritic	77/100 (9 reviews)

Review scores
Publication	Score
Game Informer	8/10
GameSpot	7.5/10
GameZone	8/10
IGN	7.5/10
Joystiq	8/10
Nintendo World Report	8/10

WordJong has received generally positive reviews from critics. Frank Provo of GameSpot stated that "Scrabble-style mahjong is pleasantly addictive." Nintendo World Report (NWR) editor, Mike Gamin, mentioned the game's variety of modes.

The game also received some negative reviews. IGN pointed out that there is barely anyone who wants to challenge another person through the Nintendo Wi-Fi Connection and that there is no tutorial provided. And, IGN mentioned that if you undid a move, there was no way to redo it. GameSpot also pointed out that the graphics and audio of the game were very plain. The NWR stated that there aren't any online communication options.
