= Age of Empires: Castle Siege =

2014 video game

- Developer: Smoking Gun Interactive
- Publisher: Microsoft Studios
- Series: Age of Empires
- Platforms: Microsoft Windows; Windows Phone iOS; Android
- Release: September 17, 2014 (Windows); May 20, 2015 (iOS); April 6, 2017 (Android)
- Genre: Massively multiplayer online tower defense
- Mode: Multiplayer

Age of Empires: Castle Siege was a free-to-play medieval massively multiplayer online tower defense game in the form of a Windows app, designed for Windows 8.1 and Windows Phone. Released in 2014, the app featured micro-transactions to aid in rapid development of a castle and to improve defensive and attacking capabilities. It was developed by Smoking Gun Interactive and Microsoft Studios, and was formally announced on August 26, 2014. Unlike any preceding Age of Empires game, Castle Siege takes the form of a tower defense game. Castle Siege was made available on iOS in 2015 and Android in 2017.

On November 13, 2018, Microsoft Studios announced that it would close the game on May 13, 2019, and since then, it is presently not working.
