= Age of Empires: World Domination =

2015 video game

- Developer: KLab Games
- Publisher: Microsoft
- Series: Age of Empires
- Platforms: Android, iOS
- Release: December 7, 2015
- Genre: Real-time strategy

Age of Empires: World Domination was a free-to-play mobile real-time strategy game developed by KLab Games and Microsoft as part of the Age of Empires series of video games, and released on December 7, 2015, in selected countries for iOS and Android devices. The game had first been announced in 2013 as a new mobile entry in the Age of Empires series. It was shut down in November 2016.

== Gameplay ==
Age of Empires: World Domination featured eight historical civilisations, resource management, a variety of heroes, exploration, and technological research, similarly to the PC games in the series. Additionally, an extra civilisation, the Koreans, was later added to the game. Also like the PC series, the game made use of the four resources of wood, food, gold, and stone, and had similar buildings such as the barracks, the archery range, and the mill, and advancement through the ages with an associated technology tree.
