= Great Siege of Malta in literature and historical fiction =

Depictions of the 1565 siege

- The 1570 Siege of Malta, written in the immediate aftermath of the events by the Cretan writer Antonios Achelis, is a classic of Cretan literature based on the accounts written by Pierre Gentil de Vendôme, which were then pirated by Marino Fracasso, while also utilized by Alfonso de Ulloa and lastly followed by a bibliographical notice of Natalis Comes in his own History of the Siege of Malta.
- Christopher Marlowe's The Jew of Malta (1589–90) takes some inspiration from the siege
- Walter Scott's novel The Siege of Malta, written in 1831-1832 shortly before his death, was not published until 2008.
- Thomas Pynchon's 1963 novel V. is partially set on Malta and details an alternate theory as to the siege's resolution.

Modern authors have attempted to capture the desperation and ferocity of the siege, with varying degrees of success.

- The Great Siege, Malta 1565, Ernle Bradford (1961)
- Dorothy Dunnett in The Disorderly Knights (1966), the third volume of The Lymond Chronicles, gives a detailed fiction account of the events of 1551 in Malta, Gozo and Tripoli. Although several of the characters are fictional, the bulk of the personages are historical.
- Marthese Fenech's Siege of Malta Trilogy includes Eight-Pointed Cross (2011), Falcon's Shadow (2020), and Ash Fall (2022), and remains faithful to historical events. The trilogy is told from the perspectives of a Maltese family and an Ottoman family, whose fates intertwine due to ongoing battles between the knights and the Ottomans, culminating in the Great Siege of 1565.
- The novel Ironfire: An Epic Novel of Love and War (2003) by David W. Ball is the story of kidnapping, slavery and revenge leading up to the siege of Malta. It takes a somewhat less sympathetic view of the Catholic Knights Hospitaller and maintains a more romantic approach. (The British edition is called The Sword and the Scimitar.)
- Angels in Iron (2004) by Nicholas Prata remains faithful to the historical narrative and tells the story from a distinctly Catholic point of view.
- The novel The Religion (2006) by Tim Willocks tells the story of the siege through the eyes of a fictional mercenary called Mattias Tannhauser, who is on Malta fighting (at times) alongside the Knights (referred to primarily as The Religion), while trying to locate the bastard son of a Maltese noblewoman. In this attempt his opponent is a high-ranking member of the Inquisition. The story presents a picture of both sides of the conflict without romanticising or sanitising the content for modern consumption.
- It is the main plot of Pirates of Christ (2007), the historical novel by Edward Lamond.
- Roger Crowley's Empires of The Sea (2008) has a lengthy section on the siege of Malta.
- The novel Blood Rock (2008) by James Jackson tells the story of the siege with a focus on a fictional English mercenary called Christian Hardy. Throughout the siege, Hardy works to discover the identity of the traitor within The Religion who works to ensure a Moslem victory. The traitor works on behalf of the French king, Francis I, who believed that peace with the Ottoman Empire was in the French interest and that the marauding Knights Hospitaller, by annoying the Sultan, threatened the security of France.
- In the video game Age of Empires III, released in 2005, the story-based campaign mode has a fictional account of the siege of Malta. The Maltese used "Hoop Throwers" that throw flaming hoops at Janissaries.
- 1565: St.Elmo's Pay – The Great Siege of Malta, released in 2020 by Tristan Hall, is a strategic card game set during the Great Siege of Malta in 1565. Players take on the roles of different factions involved in the siege, including the Knights of St. John and the Ottoman forces. The game involves resource management, tactical decisions, and combat, as players aim to control key locations and influence the outcome of the siege. The original cover for the game features Captain Gonzalo de Medrano holding a Spanish helmet and arquebus.
- Clash of Empires: The Great Siege (2011), a novel written by Christopher Hart, under the pen name William Napier, focuses on how the events of 1565 effected Nicholas Ingoldsby, a fictional English character, and the son of one of the Knights of St. John.
- The novel The Sword and the Scimitar (2012), by Simon Scarrow, is set around the Siege of Malta, and recounts events through the eyes of the disgraced veteran knight Sir Thomas Barrett (a fictional character), who is secretly searching for a hidden scroll that is in the possession of the Knights of St. John, that could threaten the reign of his Queen, Elizabeth I.
- The novel The Course of Fortune (J. Boylston, 2015), by Tony Rothman, published in three volumes, recounts the events leading up to the Siege of Malta beginning with the 1551 raid on Gozo, in which the corsair Turgut Reis (Dragut) enslaved the island's entire population. The story is told through the eyes of a young Spanish mercenary and relies heavily on early and original sources.
