= WWII Aces =

2008 video game

- Developer(s): Arcade Moon
- Publisher(s): Destineer
- Platform(s): Wii
- Release: NA: March 21, 2008
- Genre(s): Flight simulation
- Mode(s): Single-player, multiplayer

WWII Aces is a flight simulator video game set in World War II for the Wii, developed by Slovak studio Arcade Moon.

== Gameplay ==
WWII Aces allows players to choose to play as a pilot in the Royal Air Force, Luftwaffe, or the Red Army Air Force. It features 12 planes including: Spitfire, Stuka, and Mosquito bomber. The game also puts players in battles such as the Battle of Dunkirk, and the Battle of the Bulge. The game has similar controls to that of the Wii version of Blazing Angels: Squadrons of WWII. The game also features over 70 missions where the player is given the task of strategic bombing, air support, paratrooper drops, etc.

Each country in the game has four planes to choose from: a fighter, a dive bomber, a heavy bomber, and a special project plane.

== Reception ==
The game received negative reviews. Criticism was focused on unresponsive controls, bad graphics, and being frustrating.

- GameSpot - 3.5/10
- IGN - 4.5/10
- Metacritic - 41/100
- GameRankings - 37/100
