= Battle of Malta =

Battle of Malta may refer to:

- Battle of Malta (1283)
- Siege of Malta (World War II), also called the Battle of Malta
- Battle of Malta poker tournament, a poker tournament established in 2012
- Battle of the Malta Convoy, an 1800 battle

== See also ==
- Siege of Malta (disambiguation)
