= MacSoft =

American software company

- Type: Subsidiary
- Industry: Video games
- Founded: 1993; 33 years ago
- Founder: Peter Tamte
- Defunct: May 2011; 15 years ago
- Fate: Dissolved together with parent
- Headquarters: Plymouth, Minnesota, US
- Key people: Peter Tamte (vice president and general manager)
- Number of employees: 6 (1999)
- Parent: WizardWorks (1993–1996); Infogrames, Inc. (1996–2003); Destineer (2003–2011)
- Website: macsoftgames.com

MacSoft was an American video game developer and publisher founded in 1993 by Peter Tamte as a subsidiary of WizardWorks, specializing in the production of video game ports from Microsoft Windows to Macintosh operating systems, as well as productivity software. In 1996, WizardWorks was acquired by GT Interactive (later renamed Infogrames, Inc.), with WizardWorks and MacSoft split into different operations. On January 30, 2003, MacSoft was acquired by Destineer, and founder Peter Tamte again became the company's director. Ultimately, MacSoft shut down due to Destineer's closure in May 2011.

== Games published ==
- Advanced Dungeons & Dragons: Collectors Edition
- Age of Empires
- Age of Empires II
- Age of Empires III
- Age of Empires III: The Asian Dynasties
- Age of Empires III: The WarChiefs
- Age of Mythology
- Beach Head 2000
- Civilization II
- Dark Vengeance
- Deadlock: Planetary Conquest
- Duke Nukem 3D
- Fallout
- Halo: Combat Evolved
- Lode Runner 2
- Mac Arcade Pak
- Mac Arcade Pak 2
- Master of Orion II
- Max Payne
- Myth III: The Wolf Age
- Neverwinter Nights
- Neverwinter Nights: Hordes of the Underdark
- Neverwinter Nights: Shadows of Undrentide
- Quake
- Railroad Tycoon
- Railroad Tycoon 3
- Rainbow Six
- Rise of Nations Gold Edition
- Terminal Velocity
- Tropico 2: Pirate Cove
- Unreal
- Unreal Tournament 2004
- X-Men: The Ravages of Apocalypse
- Zoo Tycoon 2
