= Age of Empires III =

2005 real-time strategy video game

- Developer: Ensemble Studios
- Publishers: Microsoft Game Studios; MacSoft & Destineer (Mac); Glu (Windows Mobile, N-Gage)
- Designer: Bruce Shelley
- Programmer: Dave Pottinger
- Composer: Stephen Rippy
- Series: Age of Empires
- Platforms: Microsoft Windows; OS X Windows Mobile; N-Gage; Java (J2ME)
- Release: October 18, 2005: Windows; NA: October 18, 2005; EU: November 4, 2005 OS X; NA: November 27, 2006; EU: September 29, 2006 N-Gage; WW: April 28, 2009 Windows Mobile; WW: April 30, 2009
- Genre: Real-time strategy
- Modes: Single-player, multiplayer

Age of Empires III is a real-time strategy video game developed by Microsoft Corporation's Ensemble Studios and published by Microsoft Game Studios. The Mac version was ported over and developed and published by Destineer's MacSoft. The PC version was released on October 18, 2005, in North America and November 4, 2005, in Europe, while the Mac version was released on November 21, 2006, in North America and September 29, 2006, in Europe. An N-Gage version of the game developed by Glu Mobile was released on April 28, 2009. It is the third game of the Age of Empires series and the sequel to Age of Empires II: The Age of Kings. A remaster titled Age of Empires III: Definitive Edition was released on October 15, 2020. Its successor, Age of Empires IV, was released October 28, 2021 for Windows.

The game portrays the European colonization of the Americas, between approximately 1492 and 1876 AD. There are fourteen civilizations to play within the game. Age of Empires III has made several innovations in the series, in particular with the addition of the "Home City", which combines real-time strategy and role-playing features. Two expansion packs have been released: the first, Age of Empires III: The WarChiefs, was released on October 17, 2006, and introduced three Native American civilizations; the second, Age of Empires III: The Asian Dynasties, was released on October 23, 2007, and included three Asian civilizations.

Age of Empires III has sold over two million copies as of May 2008. As well as receiving favorable reviews, it has garnered awards, including GameSpy's "Best RTS game of 2005", and was one of the best-selling games of 2005. In 2007, Age of Empires III was the seventh best-selling computer game, with over 313,000 copies sold that year.

The original, unexpanded version of the game was delisted on October 30, 2024, with multiplayer servers taken down due to outdated technology.

== Gameplay ==
Players begin with a constructed town center or a wagon that will build into such, an armed explorer, and a modest number of villagers. Players explore the map and begin gathering resources used to build additional units and buildings and to research upgrades or technologies. Actions such as training units, constructing buildings, killing enemy units, etc., earn the player experience points. At certain experience point thresholds, players earn shipments that may be turned in for cards from the player's Home City, which can include units, upgrades, or resources. The game progresses similarly to most real-time strategy games until one side resigns.

A player-designed Imperial Age town, sitting safely behind several defensive walls (see miniature map, lower left corner). Includes a factory (center).

In Age of Empires III, the player advances through technological "Ages", representing historical time periods; these provide access to greater improvements, units, and buildings. They include the Discovery Age, which represents the discovery and exploration of the Americas by Europeans and allows the player to explore and develop their economy; the Colonial Age, which represents the European Expansion into the "New World" and unlocks early military units; the Fortress Age, which represents the fortification of the European colonies, unlocks forts, and allows the player to have a more complete military; the Industrial Age, which triggers a strong economy, due in part to factories—advanced buildings that automatically produce resources or artillery—and unlocks all units and shipments; and the Imperial Age, which unlocks all buildings and upgrades, and allows you to send unit and resource shipments a second time. All Ages cost food and coin to advance to, except the Colonial Age, which only costs food (800). The price of age advancement is incremental but does not vary between civilizations.

Similar to the "minor gods" system in Age of Mythology, Age of Empires III uses a "Politician System" to grant bonuses on a successful advancement to another age. When the player chooses to advance to the next age, they are given the choice of two or more "Politicians" that provide them with different bonuses upon selection. The Politician is given a generalized title from the period that usually reflects the bonus that it gives: for example, "The Naturalist" gives the player four cows, while "The General" gives twelve musketeers and one piece of heavy artillery. As the player's Home City increases in level, more Politicians are unlocked—at a rate of one for every ten Home City levels—up to level 60.

=== Civilizations ===
Age of Empires III allows the player to play as eight different civilizations: Spanish, British, French, Portuguese, Dutch, Russian, German, and Ottomans. Each of the eight civilizations has its own strengths and weaknesses and unique units available only to that civilization. Specific units for each civilization are designated Royal Guard units, receiving greater bonuses on the Guard upgrade in the Industrial Age, but at an increased price. The player can change the name of their Home City, the Explorer name, and is given a pre-named leader from part of the period (for example, Napoleon Bonaparte for the French Colonial Empire, Suleiman the Magnificent for Ottoman Empire, and Ivan the Terrible for the Russian Empire). Each civilization has unique shipments to aid its cultural, economy and military (for example, the Ottomans are able to order a shipment of gold for both them and their teammates).

There are other civilizations playable via the campaign, which include the Knights of St. John, John Black's Mercenaries, and the United States of America, which are played as the Spanish, German and British civilizations, respectively, with slight modifications. Non-playable campaign civilizations include the Pirates, Circle of Ossus, and Native Americans, although these civilizations are playable using the Scenario Editor.

Twelve different tribes of Native Americans are in the game as well, but these are not in themselves playable factions. However, players can gain access to unique units and improvements by forming an alliance with the tribes by building a trading post at their camps. The native tribes featured are the Aztec, Carib, Cherokee, Comanche, Cree, Inca, Iroquois, Lakota, Maya, Nootka, Seminole, and Tupi. Three of these tribes were made playable in the expansion pack Age of Empires III: The WarChiefs: the Iroquois, Lakota (under the name Sioux) and Aztecs. These civilizations were removed as the smaller, alliance-based tribes and were replaced by the Huron, Cheyenne, and Zapotec, respectively. The Apache, Klamath, and Mapuche were also added as tribes in the expansion pack. In Age of Empires III: The Asian Dynasties, another three civilizations were added, along with several new native tribes. The civilizations are the Indian, the Japanese, and the Chinese. The new tribes include the Sufis, the Shaolin, the Zen, the Udasi, the Bhakti, and the Jesuits.

=== Home Cities ===
Age of Empires III is the first game in the series to introduce the "Home City" concept. The Home City functions as a second city, a powerhouse that is separated from the active game. It cannot be attacked or destroyed, although an Imperial Age upgrade called "Blockade" stops the player's opponents from receiving Home City shipments. Similar to a role-playing game character, the Home City is persistent between games, meaning that upgrades gained through separate games can be applied and stay applied for as long as that particular city exists. Multiple Home Cities can be created and maintained, although each supports only one civilization.

The Home City is composed of five main buildings from which the player chooses their new shipment cards and customizations: The New World Trading Company, the Military Academy, the Cathedral, the Manufacturing Plant and the Harbor. Players can also access the Home City during a match by clicking on the "Home City" button represented on the HUD as the nation's flag. The Home City functions differently inside a game. Instead of customizing a Home City or choosing cards, a player can ship cards chosen before the game (and added to a deck).

During the course of a game, players gain XP (experience) by completing actions such as constructing buildings, training units, killing enemies, and collecting treasures. Whenever a certain number of experience points are gained, the player can make use of a shipment from their respective Home City. Shipments slow down as the game goes on since more XP is required with every consecutive shipment. This XP is also added directly to the home city and is collected over multiple games, allowing it to level up over time. Players can gear their cards into three different combinations: "Boom" (economic combinations), "Rush" (military combinations), or "Turtle" (defensive combinations). The first few cards chosen are automatically added to the player's portfolio, where it can be copied onto a deck for use in a game. Later in the game, cards have to be manually chosen because of the limit of cards in one deck. Most cards are available to all civilizations, but some are unique to one. If the Home City being played has more than one deck, the player must select which to use when the first shipment is sent. During a game, players keep this initial deck; this feature encourages players to build decks that are customized for the map being played on, or that counter other civilizations. The decks support twenty cards. As the Home City improves by level, you may gain an extra card slot for the decks for every 10 levels.

=== Units ===
The units of Age of Empires III are based, as in previous iterations of the game, around military classes of the historic time period. The player controls a variety of civilian and military units, and uses them to expand and develop their civilization, as well as wage war against opponents. The base unit of a game is the settler, responsible for gathering resources and constructing buildings, in order to improve the economy of the civilization. The number of units a player can control in a scenario is limited by a "population limit", a common real-time strategy game mechanic. Houses and town centers raise the starting limit, to a maximum of 200, while each unit that is produced increases the population count. Basic units such as settlers and infantry count as 1, but others, including most cavalry and mercenary infantry count as 2. More powerful units, especially artillery or mercenary cavalry, can count for a population as high as 7. Native warriors, explorers, tamed and grazing animals, hot air balloons and warships do not count towards the population limit, but generally have a build limit, allowing the player to deploy only a certain number of those specific units at a time.

A small troop of cavalry, infantry, and cannon departing, headed out to battle.

Military units are used for combat against other players. Infantry are the cheapest unit type and all are land-based, using weapons ranging from crossbows to early muskets to more advanced rifles. The heavier artillery classes also make use of ranged weapons, primarily cannon and mortars; however, there is also artillery armed with grenades. Mounted troops are also present, and are armed with either hand weapons, such as swords, or ranged weapons, such as pistols. These units also have significant features, such as skirmishers which do bonus damage against infantry, and ranged cavalry does bonus damage against other cavalry. A new unit introduced in Age of Empires III is the explorer, which is chiefly responsible for scouting and gathering treasure but is also capable of building Trading Posts and has a special attack, used at the player's command. This unit cannot be killed, but can be rendered unconscious, to be revived when friendly units are in range; also, a ransom can be paid to have it reappear at the player's town center. This ransom is credited to the player that disabled him, when applicable. Some shipment cards increase the explorer's effectiveness in gameplay; for example, providing it with "war dogs" can aid scouting and combat. In Age of Empires III, ships are available on most maps. Military ships makes use of cannon or flaming arrows, while some ships can collect resources or transport land units.

Mercenaries may aid the player in their campaigns in the New World. Mercenaries are not trained like standard units; instead, they can be shipped from the Home City or hired from saloons for a lot of gold, so that only economically powerful players can employ them. Most are powerful, but hiring them does not provide experience points, so mercenaries cannot effectively replace the player's standard army, and can negatively affect a player's economy if used excessively. Incidentally, along with hero/explorer units, Mercenaries were vulnerable to assassin units such as spies, agents and ninjas. In most cases, a selection of Native American tribes populate game maps and support their own brand of military units that can be trained once an alliance has been formed. Some Native American military units use mêlée weapons, a few use indigenous ranged weapons, such as bows and arrows or atl-atls, while still others adopt ranged European gunpowder weapons. These units usually pertain to the infantry or cavalry classes, but, on maps with water, canoes are also available to the player through the dock.

=== Buildings ===
Buildings play a big role in gameplay, as they are used for training civilian and military units, researching improvements, supporting population, providing structural defense, or as resource providers. The buildings portrayed in Age of Empires III resemble the architectural design of that era. All of the games in the series share several buildings, including the Town Center and Docks. The appearance and attributes of a building change as the player advances through the Ages, and some civilizations have their own unique buildings. The appearance of these buildings depends on civilization. Some buildings can only be built at certain times like the defensive towers.

There are certain architectural styles present in the game; architectural styles determine the appearance of in-game buildings. Each civilization is automatically assigned its architectural style. These three architectural styles are the Western European, which consists of classical styled wooden buildings and is shared by the British, French and Dutch; the Eastern European, which consists of wooden and straw structures and is shared by the Germans and Russians, and the Mediterranean, which consists of buildings made of stucco cement and dry brick, which is shared by the Spanish, Portuguese and Ottomans.

== Plot ==
The campaign follows the fictional Black family in a series of three "Acts", which divide the story arc into three generations. All three acts are narrated by Amelia Black (Tasia Valenza).

Instead of playing as one of the standard civilizations, the player controls special civilizations linked to the character or period that each Act portrays: the Knights of St. John for Act I, John Black's Mercenaries for Act II, and the United States for Act III.

=== Act I: Blood ===
In the late 16th century, Morgan Black—a Scottish-born mid-level commander of the Knights of Saint John— defends their last stronghold on Malta from the forces of Sahin "The Falcon" of the Ottoman Empire (reminiscent of the Great Siege of Malta). When the Turks flee, Morgan and his superior Alain Magnan discover a stone library telling of the Lake of the Moon; the Fountain of Youth, a rumored source of eternal life; and a secret society called the Circle of Ossus, who seek the Fountain for their own gain. Alain orders Morgan to sail to the New World to search for the Lake, but along the way Morgan is attacked by the pirate Elisabet "Lizzie" Ramsey and lands in the Caribbean islands. Morgan and his men defeat Lizzie and sail to New Spain. There, Spanish conquistador Francisco Juan Delgado de Leon captures Sahin. Morgan defends his new Aztec allies from the Spanish and learns Delgado was looking for the map to the Lake of the Moon. Morgan sets sail for Florida, but his fleet is damaged by a hurricane and docks in Havana, Cuba, where he earns Lizzie's respect and promises her the gold from the Spanish treasure fleet if she takes him to Florida.

In Florida, while Alain claims the lake, Morgan and Lizzie capture Spanish treasure ships and Sahin, killing Delgado in the process. Sahin tells Morgan that he only wanted to keep the Circle from claiming the Fountain. Alain orders Morgan to execute Sahin, but Sahin and Lizzie convince Morgan that Alain actually leads the Circle of Ossus. At the Lake of the Moon, the group defeats Alain and destroys the Fountain. Sahin returns to Turkey, and Lizzie, having lost her Spanish gold, leaves for the Caribbean, although it is hinted she and Morgan will reunite. Alone on the shore, Morgan considers refilling his canteen with the Lake's water.

=== Act II: Ice ===
In the mid-eighteenth century, Morgan's grandson, John Black, his Mohawk friend Kanyenke (renamed Ká꞉nien in the Definitive Edition), and their mercenaries are summoned by John's uncle, Stuart Black, to defend the colony of Brunswick against Cherokee raiders. After saving the colony, John and Kanyenke attack the Cherokee war camps, forcing the Cherokee to arrange a truce. While John, Kanyenke, and most of the colony's garrison are negotiating, British General Warwick leads an army to attack them and capture Brunswick. John and Kanyenke return to liberate Brunswick but learn Warwick has abducted Stuart. John concludes that the Circle of Ossus has returned. Kanyenke believes that his sister, Nonahkee, could be in danger, so they leave for New England. They find Warwick attacking Nonahkee's village, hoping to extract John's location from her. After the ensuing battle, Kanyenke discovers that John and Nonahkee are in love.

John and Kanyenke soon ally with the French in the Seven Years' War to continue fighting against Warwick. When Colonel George Washington tells them that Warwick is a renegade and from the British, John agrees to help them track him down. John's mercenaries and Washington's forces destroy Warwick's base in the Great Lakes region, where John finds Stuart's decapitated body. John and Kanyenke continue to pursue Warwick to the Rocky Mountains, where they intercept Warwick's supply train and destroy a fortified Circle base. Warwick and his troops flee even farther west to Colorado, where they have allied with the Russians. John and Kanyenke discover that the Circle plans to capture British and French colonies and towns while they are fighting, ultimately taking over North America. While John pursues Warwick, Kanyenke and some miners bring down rock bridges to stop the Russians' artillery from advancing. He and the mercenaries return east as Warwick ambushes John, who detonates explosives he has planted, killing himself and Warwick while burying the Russians and the Circle's troops in an avalanche. In the spring, Kanyenke returns to his village and learns Nonahkee has mothered John's son Nathaniel, whom he begins to help raise.

=== Act III: Steel ===
In 1817 (five years after Nathaniel's death in 1812), Amelia Black, Nathaniel's daughter and heiress owner of The Falcon Company, an American railroad company, seeks to expand operations after Nathaniel exhausted the compensation given by the British and Americans for John's sacrifice. After laying track to supply the US Cavalry near the Mexican border, Amelia meets French prospector Pierre Beaumont, who helps her and US Cavalry commander Major Ryan Cooper defeat a Mexican army attacking a fort. Beaumont leads Amelia to a Colorado mine, where an aged Kanyenke arrives to warn Amelia that Beaumont now leads the Circle of Ossus. Amelia, Kanyenke, and Cooper chase Beaumont through the mines and find a map to the Lake of the Moon. At the Lake, now a swamp, the three destroy a Circle base, after which one of Beaumont's wolves kills Cooper. Amelia, now wanting to avenge Cooper, learns from local Seminoles that an Inca city in Pacamayo Valley houses several barrels of the Fountain's water.

Amelia and Kanyenke sail to South America and help Simón Bolívar defeat the Spanish. Bolívar offers them guides, and, with the Circle's army in pursuit, they make a dangerous passage through the Andes. They discover the Inca city in Pacamayo Valley and defend it from the Circle. Amelia soon finds that Beaumont has once again escaped, this time with the barrels of the Fountain's water. Amelia and Kanyenke next fight the Circle at their last stronghold, the Ossuary, in Cuba. After they destroy the Ossuary with help from Havana, Beaumont ambushes Amelia and Kanyenke, but Amelia shoots and kills him. She then uses the Circle's stored treasure to revive the Falcon Company and builds railroads to the future west coast of the United States. Back in the US, an elderly man congratulates Amelia and her destruction of the Circle, hinting that he is Morgan Black, who drank from the Fountain of Youth and extended his life.

== Development ==
=== Technical features ===
Example demonstrating Havok graphical production in Age of Empires III. Building collapses are not pre-recorded animations. A troop of 6 cannon units and 44 rodeleros attacking a fort. The building initially collapses in two different ways in two different games. (1) First image: two explosions, smokestack on right side breaks. (2) Second image: one explosion, rooftop on left side breaks.

Age of Empires III builds on and introduces new features to the Age of Mythology engine, called Bang! Engine. One new feature is the inclusion of the Havok physics simulation middleware engine on the Windows version and the similar PhysX engine on Mac OS X. This means that many events such as building destruction and tree falls will not be pre-created animations, but will be calculated according to the physics engine, in an innovation for the series. Other graphical features of the game include bloom lighting and support for pixel shader 3.0.

=== Audio ===
The Age of Empires III original soundtrack features an original musical score composed by Ensemble Studios musicians Stephen Rippy and Kevin McMullan, whose previous work includes other games in the Age of Empires series as well as Age of Mythology. It was released on November 11, 2005, by Sumthing Else Music Works. Stephen Rippy, music and sound director at Ensemble Studios, said, "Age of Empires III is a game with an epic topic — it covers the colonization of the Americas over a period of some three hundred years, so it needed to have an epic-sounding score to match. Using a full orchestra and choir as well as some more period-inspired instrumentation, the music follows the story of Morgan Black and his descendants as they battle the Circle of Ossus for a foothold in the New World." The soundtrack also features a bonus DVD that includes fourteen tracks remixed in 5.1 surround, a behind-the-scenes video of the studio session, the Age of Empires III cinematic trailer and five exclusive bonus tracks.

Unlike previous versions of Age of Empires, the AI nations in single player skirmish mode will send voice messages to the player at various points in the game, taunting the player if they are selected as enemies or sharing military plans with the player if they are allies. All the AI characters have different personalities and many different quotes exist in the game. The feature can be easily removed if required.

== Release history ==
Following the announcement of the game on January 4, 2005, a trial version was released on September 7, 2005. This contained a cut-down version of the game, introducing new features, such as two campaign scenarios, two random map scenarios (New England and Texas) and access to two civilizations (British and Spanish), and a variety of modifications. An updated demo version was made available with the game's release on September 22, 2005.

As part of Age of Empires III launch, Ensemble Studios announced the release of the Age of Empires III Fan Site Kit on September 9, 2005.

The release of the game on September 22, 2005, saw two separate editions being made available. The standard edition included the game and manual, a collector's edition version in a presentation box that includes the official soundtrack, extra documentation, a hardback book titled Art of Empires that contains concept art and 3D renders from the game and a DVD entitled The Making of Age of Empires III.

The release of the game has been followed by a series of patches that have fixed minor bugs in the software or added new features.

Ensemble Studios released an expansion for the game named Age of Empires III: The WarChiefs on October 17, 2006. It contains three new native civilizations that can be completely controlled: the Aztecs, Iroquois, and Sioux. New content for existing European civilizations, maps and gameplay additions (such as the "revolution" feature, in which players can "revolt" from their mother country and start an active military coup in the game) was added.

A second expansion pack, Age of Empires III: The Asian Dynasties, was announced on May 18, 2007, and features three Asian civilizations: the Chinese, Indians, and Japanese. It was released on October 23, 2007.

A Mac OS X port of the game was released on November 13, 2006, by MacSoft, followed by the first expansion on June 18, 2007.

In 2009, when Ensemble Studios was closed and no support was to expect by the successor company Robot Entertainment, the game community tried to provide game support and fixes of remaining issues themselves, for instance with fan patches.

Both the original game and the first expansion were made available in a single collection titled Gold Edition on October 23, 2007.

On November 21, 2010, Microsoft sold the game including its two expansion packs as a part of the relaunch of its Games for Windows Live platform for 10 cents or 10 Microsoft points. The overwhelming and unanticipated demand created a shortage of account keys leaving some of those who had purchased the game through the promotion unable to install the game. Microsoft remedied this issue by assuring all customers who purchased the game that account keys would be generated within one week and automatically uploaded to each profile. As a result of this promotion the overall sales of the game had sharply increased.

=== Age of Empires III Mobile ===
A mobile game titled Age of Empires III was released on September 16, 2007, for J2ME. The game features a campaign about the Great Siege of Malta that consists of 15 missions in which the player can control the Knights Hospitaller and must repel the invading Ottoman forces. The game has several limitations, such as a considerably low population limit of 30 per player.

The game features 12 skirmish maps that can be played against computer opponents either. Maps that allow three players can be played either 2 vs 1, 1 vs 2, or free-for-all.

A sequel mobile game, Age of Empires III: The Asian Dynasties, was released in 2010 also for J2ME.

=== Definitive Edition ===
On August 21, 2017, Microsoft announced a remaster titled Age of Empires III: Definitive Edition at Gamescom 2017. The remaster included updated 4K graphics and the two previous expansions Age of Empires III: The WarChiefs and Age of Empires III: The Asian Dynasties. It also introduced new content in the form of two new playable civilizations, the Incas and Swedes, as well a new set of "Historical Battles" and "The Art of War" challenge missions similar to those implemented in Age of Empires II: Definitive Edition.

The Definitive Edition of Age of Empires III was developed by Tantalus Media, overseen by Xbox Game Studios' internal World's Edge studio. The game was released on October 15, 2020. On April 13, 2021, an expansion pack adding the United States civilization was released. On August 2, 2021, an expansion pack adding the Ethiopians and Hausa civilizations was released. On December 1, 2021, an expansion pack adding the Mexico civilization was released. Another expansion pack, Knights of the Mediterranean, was announced on May 12, 2022, adding both Italian and Maltese (Knights Hospitaller) civilizations, and released on May 26, 2022.

== Reception ==
Reception

Aggregate scores
Aggregator	Score
GameRankings	82%
Metacritic	81%

Review scores
Publication	Score
1Up.com	B−
Eurogamer	7/10
GameRevolution	B−
GameSpot	8.2/10
GameSpy	5/5
GameZone	9.5/10
IGN	8.8/10
PC Gamer (US)	91%
VideoGamer.com	8/10
Game-Debate	8/10

Age of Empires III was well received by critics and reviewers. The game received an average score of 82% according to GameRankings. Age of Empires III was listed as the eighth best-selling PC game of 2005, and over two million copies of it had been sold by May 2007. GameSpot pointed out that "Age of Empires III has some very big shoes to fill", and GameSpy remarked that it "may not redefine real-time strategy gaming, but it sets the bar so high that we will be comparing games to this for years". IGN also commented on the game, saying "Age of Empires III is a superbly balanced and polished game", and: "Discounting a few niggles in the interface, the whole presentation is rock solid." Game Revolution said that it is "as detailed as a history book, and about as much fun", while GameZone stated it is "one purchase you will not come to regret".

Age of Empires III was the eighth best-selling PC game of 2005 despite its late release, and sold over two million copies by May 2007. It received a "Gold" sales award from the Entertainment and Leisure Software Publishers Association (ELSPA), indicating sales of at least 200,000 copies in the United Kingdom.

The game's visuals were highly praised by reviewers. In a preview, IGN said that "After seeing the screenshots, our jaws hit the floor at the amount of detail", while in their review, 1UP.com described it as "one of the most beautiful games you will put on your computer for the foreseeable future;" GameSpy agreed, stating, "Age III's graphics are unmatched in the strategy genre." GameSpot also admired the graphics, but had a negative comment as well; they said, "Were it not for the awkward unit behavior...Age of Empires III would look truly amazing." GameSpy awarded Age of Empires III the "Best Graphics" award at GameSpy's "Game of the Year 2005", mentioning that the graphics engine boasted "all the high-end technology you would normally find in first-person shooters".

GameZone praised the game's sound effects, saying that "you will feel the explosions of the cannon balls, the muskets firing their endless volleys, and the destruction of a building. It all sounds extremely realistic, and makes the game come that much more alive." Eurogamer said: "AoE3 ... sounds fantastic", while Game Revolution mentioned, "The ambient sounds, music and voice work all suit the colonial theme."

Reviewers were divided about the single-player campaign. GameSpot thought it was "standard for a real-time strategy game", but also complained that it had "less-than-stellar voice work and awkward cutscenes"; GameSpy agreed that "Age of Empires III's campaign is not revolutionary", but thought that "the voice acting is great". IGN praised the campaign's story, in that it gave the player a "nice sense of purpose"; they thought "The 24-mission campaign is very well designed." Eurogamer said the campaign lacked originality, stating, though "well-written and imaginatively framed", the campaign "offers exactly the same kind of challenges that RTS campaigns have been offering for years;" Game Revolution disliked the campaign more than the other reviewers. Comparing it to Age of Empires II's campaign, they said: "The plot actually got worse. Age of Empires III...avoids all the interesting and prickly issues like genocide, epidemics and slavery, instead subbing in a wimpy tale of a family destined to protect the Holy Grail from a Satanic Cult."

Age of Empires III's multiplayer was the first in the series to be integrated into the game interface and was highly lauded, as was the Home City concept. The topic of multiplayer was touched by GameZone, who said "this game demands multiplayer mode, and Ensemble Studios provided this for the players", while at 1UP, the reviewer commented similarly, stating, "Multiplayer support has been significantly upgraded with a slick interface, support for clans and a number of other useful features." GameSpy commented on the Home City as well, saying, "the 'home city' system creates long-term depth and strategy". EuroGamer, however, stated: "Stop with the gifts! ... You do not need to let me flick to a home city screen every few minutes so that I can select a free unit or resource windfall. I'm not some spoilt toddler that needs to be bribed with endless sweeties." Age of Empires III uses the ESO server for multiplayer.

=== Awards ===
Age of Empires III won PC Gamer US's "Best Real-Time Strategy Game 2005" award. The magazine's Brett Todd wrote: "It was astounding how Ensemble managed to stick to the historical RTS formula yet keep the gameplay feeling fresh." The game was presented with two awards by GameSpy in 2005: "Real-time strategy game of the year" and "Best Graphics". GameSpy highly praised the game overall, giving it five stars in its review, which particularly noted the graphics and multiplayer experience. The game was named fifth-best game of 2005 by GameSpy.

Other awards, including an "Outstanding" from GameZone, reflect the positive critical reception of the game.

The game was given an 'honorable mention' in the 'Best Music' category.

During the 9th Annual Interactive Achievement Awards, the Academy of Interactive Arts & Sciences awarded Age of Empires III with "Computer Game of the Year"; it also received nominations for "Strategy Game of the Year" and "Outstanding Achievement in Online Gameplay".

Yahoo!'s report differed, but still had many positive features. Like GameSpy, Yahoo! also praised the effort put into the graphics and physics, but maintained that these are essentially eye-candy. Both Yahoo! and Eurogamer were disappointed by the traditional economics-based strategy of the game and believed that this, with the lack of useful formation and tactics, meant that the game does not stand up to other modern real-time strategy games. Eurogamer shared these final thoughts and described the new Home City shipments, along with all the treasures scattered around the map, as silly and childish ways of trying to complement the game's lack of strategy and tactical choices. However, Eurogamer recognized that Ensemble Studios was brave to implement "something quite different" from other real time strategy games — the Home City concept.

== See also ==
- Great Siege of Malta in literature and historical fiction
