= Summer Sports: Paradise Island =

2008 video game

- Cover art for Summer Sports: Paradise Island
- Developer(s): Digital Embryo
- Publisher(s): NA: Destineer; PAL: Ubisoft
- Platform(s): Wii
- Release: NA: April 15, 2008; EU: July 11, 2008; AU: September 17, 2008
- Genre(s): Sports
- Mode(s): Single-player, multiplayer

Summer Sports: Paradise Island, known as Sports Party in PAL regions, is a sports video game developed by Digital Embryo and published by Destineer for Nintendo's Wii. The game was released in North America on April 15, 2008.

The game is a collection of seven sports games similar to Wii Sports, ranging from croquet to mini-golf. The game received mostly mediocre reviews from critics, who felt that the game looked appropriately nice but was lacking in gameplay.

The game offers a choice of up to 4 players to play in multiplayer mode and a choice of 8 characters for each player to choose from. To play as yourself and not as a guest, you must create an account in the games menu. This (along with many other Wii games) is known to make multiplayer gameplay quite tricky.

== Gameplay ==
The basketball game does not let the player participate in a full game, but contains variations of the sport.

Summer Sports features seven different sports: basketball, badminton, beach volleyball, horseshoes, lawn darts, mini-golf, and croquet. The basketball game does not contain a full game of basketball, but instead allows players to play horse, Around the World, and shot clock. Horseshoes and lawn darts play their respective normal games using Wii Remote motion controls. Beach volleyball and badminton also play like their normal counterparts, and use motion controls. Mini-golf and croquet include a power meter which measures the player's strength on their shots, giving the player accurate feedback.

Golf: In the golf activity (the games most popular mini-game and also the main selling point), players can play up to 9 holes in a multitude of environments. These include science fiction, jungle and Egyptian themes holes.

Hole one - aztec themed, Hole two - graveyard themed, Hole three - jungle temple themed, Hole 4 -Egyptian mythology themed, Hole 5 - Medieval castle themed, Hole 6 - Western themed, Hole 7 - Pirate themed, Hole 8 - Alien invasion themed, Hole 9 - Dinosaur themed.

In conclusion, the golf is widely regarded as the best mini-game on the island!

== Reception ==
Summer Sports: Paradise Island received mostly mediocre reviews from critics, who found fault with the game's control scheme; the game received a 53.3% from GameRankings. IGN's Daemon Hatfield criticized the game, stating that five of the seven mini-games were "terrible" and that the other two were "okay". He noted that the instruction manual for the game was misprinted, giving instructions for basketball three times, and croquet and horseshoes instructions twice, while neglecting to have anything about the other four games. Gaming Nexus's Cyril Lachel felt that the compilation was "not as consistent" as one would hope.
