= Causes of the Indian Rebellion of 1857 =

Historians have identified diverse political, economic, military, religious and social causes of the Indian Rebellion of 1857 (first war of Indian independence).

An uprising in several sepoy companies of the Bengal army was sparked by the issue of new greased cartridges for the Enfield rifle in February 1857. Loading the Enfield often required tearing open the greased cartridge with one's teeth, and many sepoys believed that the cartridges were greased with cow and pig fat. That would have insulted both Hindu and Muslim religious practices; cows are considered holy by Hindus, and pigs are considered unclean (Haram) by Muslims.

Underlying grievances over British taxation and recent land annexations by the English East India Company (EEIC) also contributed to the anger of the sepoy mutineers, and within weeks, dozens of units of the Indian army joined peasant armies in widespread rebellion. The old aristocracy, both Muslim and Hindu, were seeing their power steadily eroded by the EIC and also rebelled against British rule.

Another important source of discontent among the Indian rulers was that the British policies of conquest had created significant unrest. In the decade prior to the rebellion, the EIC had imposed a "doctrine of lapse" of Indian leadership succession and the policy of "subsidiary alliance", both of which deprived many Indian rulers of their customary powers and privileges.

== Frictions ==
Some Indians were upset with the draconian rule of the Company who had embarked on a project of territorial expansion and westernization that was imposed without any regard for historical subtleties in Indian society. Furthermore, legal changes introduced by the British were accompanied by prohibitions on Indian religious customs and were seen as steps towards forced conversion to Christianity. As early as the Charter Act 1813 Christian missionaries were encouraged to come to Bombay and Calcutta under EIC control. The British Governor-General of India from 1848 to 1856 was Lord Dalhousie, who passed the Widow Remarriage Act of 1856, which allowed widows to remarry, like Christian women. He also passed decrees allowing Hindus who had converted to Christianity to be able to inherit property, which had been denied by local practice.

The author Pramod Nayar points out that by 1851 there were nineteen Protestant religious societies operating in India, and their goal was the conversion of Indians to Christianity. Christian organisations from Britain had additionally created 222 "unattached" mission stations across India in the decade preceding the rebellion.

Religious disquiet as the cause of rebellion underlies the work of the historian William Dalrymple, who asserts that the rebels were motivated primarily by resistance to the actions of the East India Company, especially under James Broun-Ramsay reign, which were perceived as attempts to impose Christianity and Christian laws in India. For instance, once the rebellion was underway, Mughal Emperor Bahadur Shah Zafar met the sepoys on 11 May 1857, he was told: "We have joined hands to protect our religion and our faith." They later stood in Chandni Chowk, the main square, and asked the people gathered there, "Brothers, are you with those of the faith?" Those European men and women who had converted to Islam such as Sergeant-Major Gordon, and Abdullah Beg, a former Company soldier, were spared. In contrast, foreign Christians such as Revd Midgeley, John Jennings, and Indian converts to Christianity such as one of Zafar's personal physicians, Dr. Chaman Lal, were killed.

Dalrymple further points out that as late as 6 September, when calling the inhabitants of Delhi to rally against the upcoming Company assault, Zafar issued a proclamation stating that this was a religious war being prosecuted on behalf of 'the faith', and that all Muslim and Hindu residents of the imperial city, or of the countryside were encouraged to stay true to their faith and creeds. As further evidence, he observes that the Urdu sources of the pre rebellion and post-rebellion periods usually refer to the British not as angrez (the English), goras (whites) or firangis (foreigners) but as kafir (disbeliever) and nasrani (Christians).

Some historians have suggested that the impact of British economic and social reforms has been greatly exaggerated, since the Company did not have the resources to enforce them, meaning that away from Calcutta their effect was negligible.

== Economics ==
Many Indians felt that the company was asking for heavy tax from the locals. This included an increase in the taxation on land. This seems to have been a very important reason for the spread of the rebellion, keeping in view the speed at which they ignited in many villages in northern India where farmers rushed to get back their former title deeds. The resumption of tax-free land and confiscation of jagirs (the grant or right to locally control land revenue) caused discontent among the jagirdars and zamindars. Dalhousie had also appointed Inam Commission with powers to confiscate land. Several years before the sepoys' mutiny, Lord William Bentinck had attacked several jagirs in western Bengal. He also resumed the practice of tax-free lands in some areas. These changes caused widespread resentment not only among the landed aristocracy but also caused great havoc to a larger section of the middle-class people. Lands were confiscated from the landlords and auctioned. Rich people like the merchants and moneylenders were, therefore, able to speculate in British land sales and drive out the most vulnerable peasant farmers.

== Sepoys ==
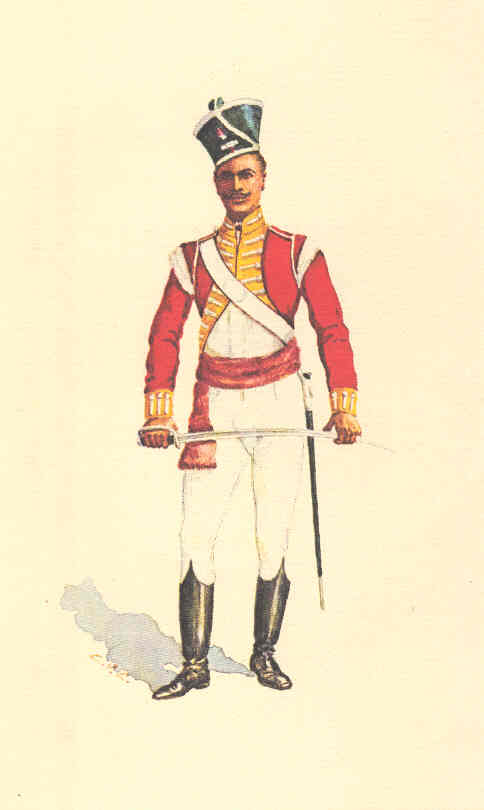
Subadar of the 21st Bengal Native Infantry (1819)

During the late eighteenth century and the early part of the nineteenth century, the armies of the East India Company, in particular those of the Bengal Presidency, were victorious and indomitable — the term "high noon of the sepoy army" has been used by a military historian. The company had an unbroken series of victories in India, against the Marathas, Mysore, north Indian states, and the Gurkhas, later against the Sikhs, and further afield in China and Burma. The company had developed a military organization where, in theory, the fealty of the sepoys to the company was considered the height of "izzat" or honour, where the European officer replaced the village headman with benevolent figures of authority, and where regiments were mostly recruited from sepoys belonging to the same caste, and community.

Unlike the Madras and Bombay Armies of the BEIC, which were far more diverse, the Bengal Army recruited its regular soldiers almost exclusively amongst the landowning Bhumihars and Rajputs of the Ganges Valley. Though paid marginally less than the Bombay and Madras Presidency troops, there was a tradition of trust between the soldiery and the establishment — the soldiers felt needed and that the company would care for their welfare. The soldiers performed well on the field of battle in exchange for which they were rewarded with symbolic heraldic rewards such as battle honors in addition to the extra pay or "batta" (foreign pay) routinely disbursed for operations committed beyond the established borders of Company rule.

Until the 1840s there had been a widespread belief amongst the Bengal sepoys in the Iqbal or continued good fortune of the East India Company. However much of this sense of the invincibility of the British was lost in the First Anglo-Afghan War where poor political judgment and inept British leadership led to the massacre of Elphinstone's army (which included three Bengal regiments) while retreating from Kabul. When the mood of the sepoys turned against their masters, they remembered Kabul and that the British were not invincible.

Caste privileges and customs within the Bengal Army were not merely tolerated but encouraged in the early years of the company's rule. Partly owing to this, Bengal sepoys were not subject to the penalty of flogging as were the European soldiers. This meant that when they came to be threatened by modernizing regimes in Calcutta, from the 1840s onwards, the sepoys had become accustomed to very high ritual status, and were extremely sensitive to suggestions that their caste might be polluted. If the caste of high-caste sepoys was considered to be "polluted", they would have to expend considerable sums of money on ritual purification before being accepted back into society.

There had been earlier indications that all was not well in the armies of the East India Company. As early as 1806, concerns that the sepoys' caste may be polluted had led to the Vellore Mutiny, which was brutally suppressed. In 1824, there was another mutiny by a regiment ordered overseas in the First Anglo-Burmese War, who were refused transport to carry individual cooking vessels and told to share communal pots. Eleven of the sepoys were executed and hundreds more sentenced to hard labor. In 1851-2 sepoys who were required to serve in the Second Anglo-Burmese War also refused to embark, but were merely sent to serve elsewhere.

The pay of the sepoy was relatively low and after Awadh and the Punjab were annexed, the soldiers no longer received extra pay (batta or bhatta) if posted there, because this was no longer considered "foreign service". Since the batta made the difference between active service being considered munificent or burdensome, the sepoys repeatedly resented and actively opposed inconsiderate unilateral changes in pay and batta ordered by the Military Audit department. Prior to the period of British rule, any refusal to proceed on service until pay issues were resolved was considered a legitimate form of displaying grievance by Indian troops serving under Indian rulers. Such measures were considered a valid negotiating tactic by the sepoys, likely to be repeated every time such issues arose. In contrast to their Indian predecessors, the British considered such refusals at times to be outright "mutinies" and therefore to be suppressed brutally. At other times however, the Company directly or indirectly conceded the legitimacy of the sepoy's demands, such as when troops of the Bengal and Madras armies refused to serve in Sindh without batta after its conquest.

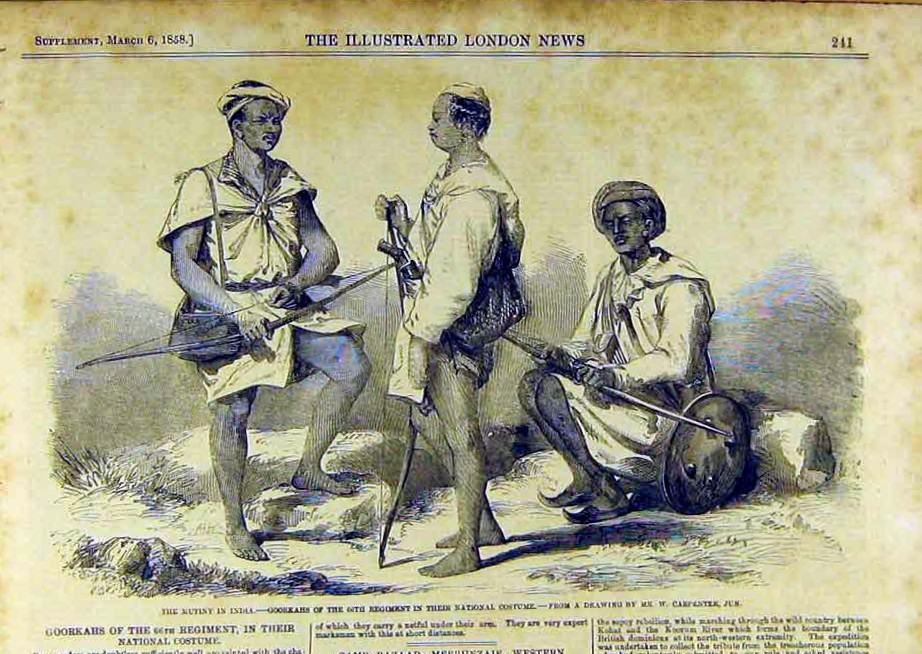
Bengal Army sepoys considered the transfer of the numeral 66th from a regular battalion of Bengal Native Infantry, disbanded over refusal to serve without batta, to the 66th Regiment of Gurkhas (seen here in native costume) as a breach of faith by the East India Company.

The varying stances of the British government, the reduction of allowances, and harsh punishments, contributed to a feeling amongst the troops that the Company no longer cared for them. Certain actions of the government, such as increased recruitment of Sikhs and Gurkhas, peoples considered by the Bengal sepoys to be inferior in caste to them, increased the distrust of the sepoys who thought that this was a sign of their services not being needed any more. The transfer of the number 66th which was taken away from a regular Bengal Sepoy regiment of the line disbanded over refusal to serve without batta, and given to a Gurkha battalion, was considered by the Sepoy as a breach of faith by the company.

At the beginning of the nineteenth century, British officers were generally closely involved with their troops, speaking Indian languages fluently; participating in local culture through such practices as having regimental flags and weapons blessed by Brahman priests; and frequently having native mistresses. Later, the attitudes of British officers changed with increased intolerance, lack of involvement and unconcern of the welfare of troops becoming manifest more and more. Some historians argue that later governors-general like Lord Dalhousie were perceived by sepoys as distant and unsympathetic, in contrast to earlier administrators such as Lord William Bentinck. As time passed, the powers of the commanding officers reduced and the government became more unfeeling or distant from the concerns of the sepoys.

Officers of an evangelical persuasion in the company's Army (such as Herbert Edwardes and Colonel S.G. Wheler of the 34th Bengal Infantry) had taken to preaching to their Sepoys in the hope of converting them to Christianity.

The General Services Enlistment Act of 1856 required new recruits to serve overseas if asked. The serving high-caste sepoys were fearful that this requirement would be eventually extended to them, violating observance of the kala pani prohibition on sea travel. Thus, the Hindu soldiers viewed the Act as a potential threat to their faith.

In 1857, the Bengal Army contained 10 regular regiments of Indian cavalry and 74 of infantry. All of the Bengal Native Cavalry regiments and 45 of the infantry units rebelled at some point. Following the disarming and disbandment of an additional seventeen Bengal Native Infantry regiments, which were suspected of planning mutiny, only twelve survived to serve in the new post-mutiny army. Once the first rebellions took place, it was clear to most British commanders that the grievances which led to them were felt throughout the Bengal army and no Indian unit could wholly be trusted, although many officers continued to vouch for their men's loyalty, even in the face of captured correspondence indicating their intention to rebel.

The Bengal Army also administered, sometimes loosely, 29 regiments of irregular horses and 42 of irregular infantry. Some of these units belonged to states allied to the British or recently absorbed into British-administered territory, and of these, two large contingents from the states of Awadh and Gwalior readily joined the growing rebellion. Other irregular units were raised in frontier areas from communities such as Assamese or Pashtuns to maintain order locally. Few of these participated in the rebellion, and one contingent in particular (the recently raised Punjab Irregular Force) actively participated on the British side.

The Bengal Army also contained three "European" regiments of infantry and many artillery units manned by white personnel. Due to the need for technical specialists, the artillery units generally had a higher proportion of British personnel. Although the armies of many Rajas or states which rebelled contained large numbers of guns, the British superiority in artillery was to be decisive in the siege of Delhi after the arrival of a siege train of thirty-two howitzers and mortars.

There were also a number of regiments from the British Army (referred to in India as "Queen's troops") stationed in India, but in 1857 several of these had been withdrawn to take part in the Crimean War or the Anglo-Persian War of 1856. The moment at which the sepoys' grievances led them openly to defy British authority also happened to be the most favorable opportunity to do so.

== The Pattern 1853 Enfield Rifled Musket ==
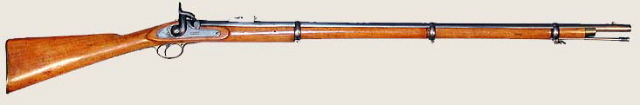
Pattern 1853 Enfield rifled musket

The two weapons which used the cartridge supposedly sealed with pig and cow fat

Sepoys throughout India were issued with a new rifle, the Pattern 1853 Enfield rifled musket—a more powerful and accurate weapon than the old but smoothbore Brown Bess they had been using for the previous decades. The rifling inside the musket barrel ensured accuracy at much greater distances than was possible with old muskets. One thing did not change in this new weapon — the loading process, which did not improve significantly until the introduction of breech loaders and metallic, one-piece cartridges a few decades later.

To load both the old musket and the new rifle, soldiers had to bite the cartridge open and pour the gunpowder it contained into the rifle's muzzle, then stuff the paper cartridge (overlaid with a thin mixture of beeswax and mutton tallow for waterproofing) into the musket as wadding, the ball being secured to the top of the cartridge and guided into place for ramming down the muzzle. The rifle's cartridges contained 68 grains of FF black powder, and the ball was typically a 530-grain Pritchett or a Burton-Minié ball.

Many sepoys believed that the cartridges that were standard issue with the new rifle were greased with lard (pork fat) which was regarded as unclean by Muslims and tallow (cow fat) which angered the Hindus as cows were equal to a goddess to them. The sepoys' British officers dismissed these claims as rumors and suggested that the sepoys make a batch of fresh cartridges, using a religiously acceptable greasing agent such as ghee or vegetable oil. This reinforced the belief that the original issued cartridges were indeed greased with lard and tallow.

Another suggestion they put forward was to introduce a new drill, in which the cartridge was not bitten with the teeth but torn open with the hand. The sepoys rejected this alternative drill, arguing that soldiers might forget the change and accidentally bite the cartridges out of habit, especially since military drills at the time emphasized repetitive motions to maintain a high rate of fire. British and Indian military drills of the time required soldiers to bite off the end of the Beeswax paper cartridge, pour the gunpowder contained within down the barrel, stuff the remaining paper cartridge into the barrel, ram the paper cartridge (which included the ball wrapped and tied in place) down the barrel, remove the ram-rod, return the ram-rod, bring the rifle to the ready, set the sights, add a percussion cap, present the rifle, and fire. The musketry books also recommended that, "Whenever the grease around the bullet appears to be melted away, or otherwise removed from the cartridge, the sides of the bullet should be wetted in the mouth before putting it into the barrel; the saliva will serve the purpose of grease for the time being" This meant that biting a musket cartridge was second nature to the Sepoys, some of whom had decades of service in the company's army, and who had been doing musket drill for every day of their service. The first sepoy who rebelled by aiming his loaded weapon at a British officer was Mangal Pandey who was later executed.

== Prophecies, omens, signs and rumours ==
Many sepoys believed in a prophecy that the Company's rule would end after 100 years, dating from the Battle of Plassey in 1757. While historians debate its origins, this belief was cited as one factor that heightened tensions in 1857. This took the form of Muslim millenarianism, with preachers in Lucknow foretelling the end of the raj. In some districts like Muzaffarnagar and Saharanpur, Bose and Jalal argue that "the revolt took on a distinctly millenarian flavour." Their rule in India had begun with the Battle of Plassey in 1757.

Before the rebellion, there were reports that "holy men" were mysteriously circulating chapatis and lotus flowers among the sepoys. Leader of the British Conservative Party and future prime minister Benjamin Disraeli argued these objects were signs to rebel and evidence of a conspiracy, and the press echoed this belief.

After the rebellion, there was rumour in Britain that Russia was responsible.
