= Angels in Iron =

1998 novel by Nicholas Prata

Angels in Iron is a historical novel by Nicholas C. Prata. It portrays the events surrounding the Siege of Malta in the 16th century, at that time held by the Knights Hospitaller and by Suleiman the Magnificent. Although some of the characters (most notably Knight Commander Jean Parisot de Valette and Suleiman himself) are factual, most of the rest of the knights and Moors are fictional.

== Overview ==
The novel Angels in Iron is based on a true story about the Siege of Malta which took place in 1565. Nicholas C. Prata poignantly portrays the unparalleled heroism displayed by the Hospitallers during the true events of the battle.

In 1523, the Turks overpower Rhodes. The vanquished, known as the Knights of the St. John and as the Hospitallers, flee the island. If given the command, a dashing young knight named Jean Parisot de Valette would have stood the onslaught and defended the island.

After 42 years, the Turkish army of Suleiman strikes again and the Hospitallers face the same crisis at the besieged fortress at Malta, a war against Christendom. The circumstances, however, are different this time as assisted by his fellow knights, de Valette bravely puts up a fierce fight against the invading Turks. Along with his compatriots he sacrifices his life to defend the Cross from the Koran, a bitter battle between faith and despair.

== Critical reviews ==
- "Angels in Iron is compellingly written and surprisingly difficult to put down....The characters are well developed and the pace of the novel is brisk. The short chapters are like potato chips...you can't stop after just a few and you keep going back for more. A fascinating read for adults and teens...."

— The St. Linus Review

- "After reading this inspiring work, one is drawn to the inescapable conclusion that, above all, it was the knight’s abnegation for the Faith that led to victory....The story is engaging and inspiring. Not only will its non-stop action keep you on the edge of your seat, but it exemplifies the virtue of abnegation, so necessary for faithful Catholics in these trying times."

— Michael Whitcraft for The American Society for the Defense of Tradition, Family, and Property

- "Prata caught my interest immediately with his outstanding depiction of the Siege of Malta. He fully captures the reality of the situation and has no problems with portraying the bravery, sacrifice, loss, anguish, and frustration of both sides....Real history told in an entertaining fashion. I couldn't put it down."

—Nth Degree: The Fiction and Fandom 'Zine.
