= Age of Empires: The Age of Kings =

2006 video game

- Developer: Backbone Entertainment
- Publisher: Majesco
- Designers: Tyler Sigman, Eric Emery
- Composer: Chris Rezanson
- Series: Age of Empires
- Platform: Nintendo DS
- Release: NA: February 14, 2006; EU: November 10, 2006; AU: November 16, 2006
- Genre: Turn-based strategy
- Modes: Single-player, multiplayer

Age of Empires: The Age of Kings is a turn-based strategy video game developed by Backbone Entertainment and published by Majesco for the Nintendo DS handheld video game console. It is a spin-off of Microsoft's Age of Empires series.

The Age of Kings allows the player to command any one of five historical civilizations: the Britons, Franks, Mongols, Saracens and Japanese. It has a single-player campaign and scenario mode, as well as a multiplayer Wireless and hotseat mode.

== Gameplay ==
The Age of Kings is turn-based. As a derivative of the Age of Empires series, other games of which are real-time strategy as opposed to turn-based strategy, The Age of Kings incorporates several features and mechanics commonly associated with real-time strategy, including technology advancement and resource and building management.

The playing field is divided into a grid, with the player having an overhead perspective of the map. Units are able to move a certain amount of spaces in the four cardinal directions, with how far they can go affected by several variables, including the unit's natural movement abilities and terrain. Each unit type is given a specific amount of spaces that it can move, with some having better movement capabilities than others. There are a variety of terrain types, such as roads, forests and grass. Roads are best for movement, while some terrains slow the player down but can provide other advantages, such as extra range or defense.

Each of the five civilizations has its own hero, which is stronger than other units. The Japanese hero is Minamoto no Yoshitsune; the Saracens' hero is Saladin; the Mongols' hero is Genghis Khan; the Franks' heroine is Joan of Arc; and the Britons' hero is King Richard the Lionheart. Each hero has special abilities which are unique to them. Each civilization is also unique in the sense that they have different Unit Art (the Franks and Britons share art, and the Mongols and the Saracens share art), different Special Units (powerful civilization-specific units trainable from castles), and different high- and low-cost units.

Most units are divided into four main categories: Infantry, cavalry, ranged and siege units. Infantry and cavalry units are only able to attack an enemy unit or structure in any adjacent square (with the exception of squares which are diagonally adjacent), while ranged units and some siege units are able to attack from a greater distance. Each unit has movement, attack, defense, range and vision values. Some units may have additional defensive bonuses against certain types of enemy units or abilities.

There are many variables to be taken into account before battling an enemy. Before entering the battle, the game will display the statistics of both units, which consists of the units' health points, attack power, and defensive capabilities. This screen shows an adviser, who predicts the chance a given attack has of being successful. The attack power and defensive capabilities of the attacking unit vary depending on the opposing unit's special abilities. When the units enter into battle, many warriors are seen, which begin to battle each other. The attacking units usually do more damage as they get the first strike. As a unit's HP drops, their attack power does as well.

The player can advance their civilization by researching new units, technologies and other advancements. Once the player advances far enough in research or completes certain conditions, a new age is made available. Players usually start in the first age, the Dark Age, and progress through later ages, including the Feudal, Castle and Imperial ages. Advancing in age unlocks new subjects for the player to research, makes additional buildings and units available, and upgrades existing units to their equivalent in the new age.

=== Campaign ===
The Age of Kings includes a campaign divided into five sections, one for each civilization. Each section contains five or six missions. The first section of the campaign, following Joan of Arc, acts as a tutorial and educates the player about the basics of the game. Campaign missions vary widely in characteristics. Some contain a field effect known as the fog of war, and in some missions the player starts out with some buildings while in others the player may start without any. By playing to earn "Empire Points", the player can buy powerful units to use in-game from the Bonus Items Shop, as well as new maps to play on in Single Scenario (freeplay) mode. Each mission has main goals as well as secondary goals, the latter of which increase the number of Empire Points gained when the mission is completed.

=== Multiplayer ===
The Age of Kings contains a multiplayer mode which can support up to four players. Multiplayer can be played on a single DS in hotseat mode, or in wireless multi-card mode, where each player has a DS and a copy of the game.

== Development ==
The vast majority of content from Age of Empires II: The Age of Kings was ported to the DS, in what Official Nintendo Magazine described as a huge task. The sole exception was said to be the political scheming in the PC version, though there was still some contained in the DS counterpart.

== Reception ==
Age of Empires: The Age of Kings has received an average score of 80.0% at GameRankings (based on 45 reviews), and an average score of 80/100 at Metacritic (based on 38 reviews). Both IGN and GameSpot gave it an 8.2/10, saying that the gameplay was solid, although they stated that it should have had more civilizations and online play. Both IGN and Electronic Gaming Monthly each gave it a Game of the Month award. It received an award for "Best Game Design" Elan award in the inaugural Canadian Awards for the Electronic & Animated Arts on September 14, 2006. It was also nominated for 2006 BAFTA (British Academy of Film and Television Award): Best Strategy Game.
