= Destineer =

American umbrella company

Destineer, Inc.
- Type: Private
- Industry: Video games
- Founded: 2001
- Founder: Peter Tamte
- Defunct: May 2011
- Fate: Dissolved
- Headquarters: Minnetonka, Minnesota, U.S.
- Area served: North America
- Key people: Paul Rinde (CEO)
- Divisions: Destineer Holdings, Inc.; Destineer Publishing Corp.; Destineer Studios, Inc.
- Subsidiaries: Atomic Games; Bold Games; MacSoft
- Website: destineergames.com

Destineer, Inc. was an American umbrella company covering a holding company, a video game publisher, and video game developer based in Minnetonka, Minnesota. The company was founded by Peter Tamte, former executive vice-president of Bungie, in 2001. It developed some original titles and also ported games from Windows to Macs under a number of different brands, including MacSoft and Bold Games.

In May 2011, the company silently shut down, together with all of its divisions and subsidiaries.

== Subsidiaries ==
- MacSoft: On January 30, 2003, Infogrames Inc. announced it had sold MacSoft to Destineer, Inc.
- Atomic Games, Inc.: On May 6, 2005, Destineer announced its acquisition of Atomic Games, Inc.
- Bold Games: A publishing label for Microsoft video games ported to Mac OS. The brand stopped publishing Mac OS games following MacSoft's acquisition.

== Published games ==
- Age of Empires II
- Age of Empires III
- Cate West: The Vanishing Files
- Close Combat: First to Fight
- Fullmetal Alchemist Trading Card Game
- Fullmetal Alchemist: Dual Sympathy
- Giana Sisters DS
- Homie Rollerz
- Indianapolis 500 Legends
- Iron Chef America: Supreme Cuisine
- John Deere: American Farmer
- Links Championship Edition
- Little Red Riding Hood's Zombie BBQ
- Master of Orion III
- Neverwinter Nights
- North American Hunting Extravaganza
- Rec Room Games
- Red Orchestra: Ostfront 41-45
- Samurai Deeper Kyo
- Starship Troopers
- Stoked
- Summer Sports: Paradise Island
- Sword of the Stars
- Taito Legends
- Taito Legends 2
- Taito Legends Power-Up
- Tropico
- Unreal Tournament 2003
- Unreal Tournament 2004
- We Wish You a Merry Christmas
- Wings Over Europe
- Wings Over Vietnam
- WordJong DS
- WWII Aces
