= List of Xbox video games =

This is a list of video games, expansion packs, and DLCs, produced and published by subsidiaries of American video game company Xbox, a division of Microsoft, the third largest video game company in the world by revenue. The list encompasses games produced or released by all current and defunct labels or subsidiaries of Xbox, including Activision, Xbox Game Studios, Bethesda Softworks, Blizzard Entertainment, Mojang Studios and King.

Some of the video game franchises owned and published by Xbox labels include Call of Duty, Minecraft, The Elder Scrolls, Halo, Fallout, Warcraft, Diablo, Doom, Wolfenstein, Crash Bandicoot, Spyro, Banjo-Kazooie, Skylanders, Overwatch, StarCraft, Forza, Fable, Tony Hawk's, Guitar Hero, Microsoft Flight Simulator, Age of Empires, Candy Crush, Quake, Pillars of Eternity, Wasteland, Gears of War, Grounded, and others.

Xbox releases video games on multiple platforms annually, including Windows, macOS, PlayStation 4, PlayStation 5, Xbox One, Xbox Series X/S, Nintendo Switch, Nintendo Switch 2, Browsers, iOS, and Android. The list does not retroactively include video games that were previously produced prior to being acquired by Microsoft.

== Video games ==
Title	Platform(s)	Release date	Developer(s)	Publisher	Ref.
Ghostwire: Tokyo	Windows	March 25, 2022	Tango Gameworks	Bethesda Softworks	
Ghostwire: Tokyo	PlayStation 5	March 25, 2022	Tango Gameworks	Bethesda Softworks	
Ghostwire: Tokyo	Xbox Series X/S	April 12, 2023	Tango Gameworks	Bethesda Softworks	
Hero Dice	iOS	March 30, 2022	Tango Gameworks	Bethesda Softworks	
Hero Dice	Android	March 30, 2022	Tango Gameworks	Bethesda Softworks	
As Dusk Falls	Windows	July 19, 2022	Interior Night	Xbox Game Studios	
As Dusk Falls	Xbox Series X/S	July 19, 2022	Interior Night	Xbox Game Studios	
Deathloop	Xbox Series X/S	September 20, 2022	Arkane Lyon	Bethesda Softworks	
Grounded	Windows	September 27, 2022	Obsidian Entertainment	Xbox Game Studios	
Grounded	Xbox One	September 27, 2022	Obsidian Entertainment	Xbox Game Studios	
Grounded	Xbox Series X/S	September 27, 2022	Obsidian Entertainment	Xbox Game Studios	
Pentiment	Windows	November 15, 2022	Obsidian Entertainment	Xbox Game Studios	
Pentiment	Xbox One	November 15, 2022	Obsidian Entertainment	Xbox Game Studios	
Pentiment	Xbox Series X/S	November 15, 2022	Obsidian Entertainment	Xbox Game Studios	
Pentiment	PlayStation 5	February 22, 2024	Obsidian Entertainment	Xbox Game Studios	
GoldenEye 007	Xbox One	January 12, 2023	Rare, Code Mystics	Xbox Game Studios	
GoldenEye 007	Xbox Series X/S	January 12, 2023	Rare, Code Mystics	Xbox Game Studios	
Hi-Fi Rush	Windows	January 25, 2023	Tango Gameworks	Bethesda Softworks	
Hi-Fi Rush	Xbox Series X/S	January 25, 2023	Tango Gameworks	Bethesda Softworks	
Hi-Fi Rush	PlayStation 5	March 19, 2024	Tango Gameworks	Bethesda Softworks	
Age of Empires II: Definitive Edition	Xbox One	January 31, 2023	World's Edge, Tantalus Media	Xbox Game Studios	
Age of Empires II: Definitive Edition	Xbox Series X/S	January 31, 2023	World's Edge, Tantalus Media	Xbox Game Studios	
Age of Empires II: Definitive Edition	PlayStation 5	May 6, 2025	World's Edge, Tantalus Media	Xbox Game Studios	
Mighty Doom	iOS	March 21, 2023	Alpha Dog Games	Bethesda Softworks	
Mighty Doom	Android	March 21, 2023	Alpha Dog Games	Bethesda Softworks	
Minecraft Legends	Nintendo Switch	April 18, 2023	Mojang Studios, Blackbird Interactive	Xbox Game Studios	
Minecraft Legends	Windows	April 18, 2023	Mojang Studios, Blackbird Interactive	Xbox Game Studios	
Minecraft Legends	PlayStation 4	April 18, 2023	Mojang Studios, Blackbird Interactive	Xbox Game Studios	
Minecraft Legends	PlayStation 5	April 18, 2023	Mojang Studios, Blackbird Interactive	Xbox Game Studios	
Minecraft Legends	Xbox One	April 18, 2023	Mojang Studios, Blackbird Interactive	Xbox Game Studios	
Minecraft Legends	Xbox Series X/S	April 18, 2023	Mojang Studios, Blackbird Interactive	Xbox Game Studios	
Redfall	Windows	May 2, 2023	Arkane Austin	Bethesda Softworks	
Redfall	Xbox Series X/S	May 2, 2023	Arkane Austin	Bethesda Softworks	
Quake II Remaster	Windows	August 10, 2023	Nightdive Studios	Bethesda Softworks	
Quake II Remaster	PlayStation 4	August 10, 2023	Nightdive Studios	Bethesda Softworks	
Quake II Remaster	PlayStation 5	August 10, 2023	Nightdive Studios	Bethesda Softworks	
Quake II Remaster	Xbox One	August 10, 2023	Nightdive Studios	Bethesda Softworks	
Quake II Remaster	Xbox Series X/S	August 10, 2023	Nightdive Studios	Bethesda Softworks	
Age of Empires IV	Xbox One	August 22, 2023	World's Edge, Relic Entertainment	Xbox Game Studios	
Age of Empires IV	Xbox Series X/S	August 22, 2023	World's Edge, Relic Entertainment	Xbox Game Studios	
Age of Empires IV	PlayStation 5	November 4, 2025	World's Edge, Relic Entertainment	Xbox Game Studios	
Starfield	Windows	September 6, 2023	Bethesda Game Studios	Bethesda Softworks	
Starfield	Xbox Series X/S	September 6, 2023	Bethesda Game Studios	Bethesda Softworks	
Starfield	PlayStation 5	April 7, 2026	Bethesda Game Studios	Bethesda Softworks	
Forza Motorsport	Microsoft Windows	October 10, 2023	Turn 10 Studios	Xbox Game Studios	
Forza Motorsport	Xbox Series X/S	October 10, 2023	Turn 10 Studios	Xbox Game Studios	
Call of Duty: Modern Warfare III	Windows	November 10, 2023	Sledgehammer Games	Activision	
Call of Duty: Modern Warfare III	PlayStation 4	November 10, 2023	Sledgehammer Games	Activision	
Call of Duty: Modern Warfare III	PlayStation 5	November 10, 2023	Sledgehammer Games	Activision	
Call of Duty: Modern Warfare III	Xbox One	November 10, 2023	Sledgehammer Games	Activision	
Call of Duty: Modern Warfare III	Xbox Series X/S	November 10, 2023	Sledgehammer Games	Activision	
Killer Instinct: Anniversary Edition	Microsoft Windows	November 28, 2023	Iron Galaxy Studios	Xbox Game Studios	
Killer Instinct: Anniversary Edition	Xbox Series X/S	November 28, 2023	Iron Galaxy Studios	Xbox Game Studios	
Call of Duty: Warzone Mobile	Android	March 21, 2024	Digital Legends Entertainment, Beenox, Activision Shanghai Studio, Solid State Studios	Activision	
Call of Duty: Warzone Mobile	iOS	March 21, 2024	Digital Legends Entertainment, Beenox, Activision Shanghai Studio, Solid State Studios	Activision	
Sea of Thieves	PlayStation 5	April 30, 2024	Rare	Xbox Game Studios	
Senua's Saga: Hellblade II	Windows	May 21, 2024	Ninja Theory	Xbox Game Studios	
Senua's Saga: Hellblade II	Xbox Series X/S	May 21, 2024	Ninja Theory	Xbox Game Studios	
Senua's Saga: Hellblade II	PlayStation 5	August 12, 2025	Ninja Theory	Xbox Game Studios	
Age of Mythology: Retold	Windows	September 4, 2024	World's Edge, Forgotten Empires	Xbox Game Studios	
Age of Mythology: Retold	Xbox Series X/S	September 4, 2024	World's Edge, Forgotten Empires	Xbox Game Studios	
Age of Mythology: Retold	PlayStation 5	March 4, 2025	World's Edge, Forgotten Empires	Xbox Game Studios	
The Elder Scrolls: Castles	iOS	September 10, 2024	Bethesda Game Studios	Bethesda Softworks	
The Elder Scrolls: Castles	Android	September 10, 2024	Bethesda Game Studios	Bethesda Softworks	
Ara: History Untold	Windows	September 24, 2024	Oxide Games	Xbox Game Studios	
Age of Empires: Mobile	iOS	October 17, 2024	Timi Studios, World's Edge	Xbox Game Studios	
Age of Empires: Mobile	Android	October 17, 2024	Timi Studios, World's Edge	Xbox Game Studios	
Age of Empires: Mobile	Windows	June 23, 2026	Timi Studios, World's Edge	Xbox Game Studios	
Call of Duty: Black Ops 6	Windows	October 25, 2024	Treyarch, Raven Software	Activision	
Call of Duty: Black Ops 6	PlayStation 4	October 25, 2024	Treyarch, Raven Software	Activision	
Call of Duty: Black Ops 6	PlayStation 5	October 25, 2024	Treyarch, Raven Software	Activision	
Call of Duty: Black Ops 6	Xbox One	October 25, 2024	Treyarch, Raven Software	Activision	
Call of Duty: Black Ops 6	Xbox Series X/S	October 25, 2024	Treyarch, Raven Software	Activision	
Warcraft Remastered Battle Chest	MacOS	November 13, 2024	Blizzard Entertainment	Blizzard Entertainment	
Warcraft Remastered Battle Chest	Windows	November 13, 2024	Blizzard Entertainment	Blizzard Entertainment	
Microsoft Flight Simulator 2024	Windows	November 19, 2024	Asobo Studio	Xbox Game Studios	
Microsoft Flight Simulator 2024	Xbox Series X/S	November 19, 2024	Asobo Studio	Xbox Game Studios	
Microsoft Flight Simulator 2024	PlayStation 5	December 8, 2025	Asobo Studio	Xbox Game Studios	
Indiana Jones and the Great Circle	Windows	December 9, 2024	MachineGames	Bethesda Softworks	
Indiana Jones and the Great Circle	Xbox Series X/S	December 9, 2024	MachineGames	Bethesda Softworks	
Indiana Jones and the Great Circle	PlayStation 5	April 17, 2025	MachineGames	Bethesda Softworks	
Indiana Jones and the Great Circle	Nintendo Switch 2	May 12, 2026	MachineGames	Bethesda Softworks	
Candy Crush Solitaire	iOS	February 6, 2025	King	King	
Candy Crush Solitaire	Android	February 6, 2025	King	King	
Avowed	Windows	February 18, 2025	Obsidian Entertainment	Xbox Game Studios	
Avowed	Xbox Series X/S	February 18, 2025	Obsidian Entertainment	Xbox Game Studios	
Avowed	PlayStation 5	February 17, 2026	Obsidian Entertainment	Xbox Game Studios	
South of Midnight	Windows	April 8, 2025	Compulsion Games	Xbox Game Studios	
South of Midnight	Xbox Series X/S	April 8, 2025	Compulsion Games	Xbox Game Studios	
South of Midnight	Nintendo Switch 2	March 31, 2026	Compulsion Games	Xbox Game Studios	
South of Midnight	PlayStation 5	March 31, 2026	Compulsion Games	Xbox Game Studios	
The Elder Scrolls IV: Oblivion Remastered	Windows	April 22, 2025	Virtuos, Bethesda Game Studios	Bethesda Softworks	
The Elder Scrolls IV: Oblivion Remastered	PlayStation 5	April 22, 2025	Virtuos, Bethesda Game Studios	Bethesda Softworks	
The Elder Scrolls IV: Oblivion Remastered	Xbox Series X/S	April 22, 2025	Virtuos, Bethesda Game Studios	Bethesda Softworks	
The Elder Scrolls IV: Oblivion Remastered	Nintendo Switch 2	August 11, 2026	Virtuos, Bethesda Game Studios	Bethesda Softworks	
Forza Horizon 5	PlayStation 5	April 29, 2025	Playground Games, Panic Button	Xbox Game Studios	
Doom: The Dark Ages	Windows	May 15, 2025	id Software	Bethesda Softworks	
Doom: The Dark Ages	PlayStation 5	May 15, 2025	id Software	Bethesda Softworks	
Doom: The Dark Ages	Xbox Series X/S	May 15, 2025	id Software	Bethesda Softworks	
Retro Classics	Windows	May 21, 2025	Antstream	Xbox Game Studios	
Retro Classics	Xbox Series X/S	May 21, 2025	Antstream	Xbox Game Studios	
Tony Hawk's Pro Skater 3 + 4	Microsoft Windows	July 11, 2025	Iron Galaxy	Activision	
Tony Hawk's Pro Skater 3 + 4	Nintendo Switch	July 11, 2025	Iron Galaxy	Activision	
Tony Hawk's Pro Skater 3 + 4	Nintendo Switch 2	July 11, 2025	Iron Galaxy	Activision	
Tony Hawk's Pro Skater 3 + 4	PlayStation 4	July 11, 2025	Iron Galaxy	Activision	
Tony Hawk's Pro Skater 3 + 4	PlayStation 5	July 11, 2025	Iron Galaxy	Activision	
Tony Hawk's Pro Skater 3 + 4	Xbox One	July 11, 2025	Iron Galaxy	Activision	
Tony Hawk's Pro Skater 3 + 4	Xbox Series X/S	July 11, 2025	Iron Galaxy	Activision	
Grounded 2	Windows	July 29, 2025	Obsidian Entertainment, Eidos-Montréal	Xbox Game Studios	
Grounded 2	Xbox Series X/S	July 29, 2025	Obsidian Entertainment, Eidos-Montréal	Xbox Game Studios	
Grounded 2	PlayStation 5	August 11, 2026	Obsidian Entertainment, Eidos-Montréal	Xbox Game Studios	
Heretic + Hexen	Nintendo Switch	August 7, 2025	Id Software, Nightdive Studios	Bethesda Softworks	
Heretic + Hexen	Windows	August 7, 2025	Id Software, Nightdive Studios	Bethesda Softworks	
Heretic + Hexen	PlayStation 4	August 7, 2025	Id Software, Nightdive Studios	Bethesda Softworks	
Heretic + Hexen	PlayStation 5	August 7, 2025	Id Software, Nightdive Studios	Bethesda Softworks	
Heretic + Hexen	Xbox One	August 7, 2025	Id Software, Nightdive Studios	Bethesda Softworks	
Heretic + Hexen	Xbox Series X/S	August 7, 2025	Id Software, Nightdive Studios	Bethesda Softworks	
Gears of War: Reloaded	PlayStation 5	August 26, 2025	The Coalition, Sumo Digital, Disbelief	Xbox Game Studios	
Gears of War: Reloaded	Windows	August 26, 2025	The Coalition, Sumo Digital, Disbelief	Xbox Game Studios	
Gears of War: Reloaded	Xbox Series X/S	August 26, 2025	The Coalition, Sumo Digital, Disbelief	Xbox Game Studios	
Keeper	Windows	October 17, 2025	Double Fine	Xbox Game Studios	
Keeper	Xbox Series X/S	October 17, 2025	Double Fine	Xbox Game Studios	
Ninja Gaiden 4	Windows	October 21, 2025	Team Ninja, PlatinumGames	Xbox Game Studios	
Ninja Gaiden 4	PlayStation 5	October 21, 2025	Team Ninja, PlatinumGames	Xbox Game Studios	
Ninja Gaiden 4	Xbox Series X/S	October 21, 2025	Team Ninja, PlatinumGames	Xbox Game Studios	
The Outer Worlds 2	Windows	October 29, 2025	Obsidian Entertainment	Xbox Game Studios	
The Outer Worlds 2	PlayStation 5	October 29, 2025	Obsidian Entertainment	Xbox Game Studios	
The Outer Worlds 2	Xbox Series X/S	October 29, 2025	Obsidian Entertainment	Xbox Game Studios	
Call of Duty: Black Ops 7	Windows	November 14, 2025	Treyarch, Raven Software	Activision	
Call of Duty: Black Ops 7	PlayStation 4	November 14, 2025	Treyarch, Raven Software	Activision	
Call of Duty: Black Ops 7	PlayStation 5	November 14, 2025	Treyarch, Raven Software	Activision	
Call of Duty: Black Ops 7	Xbox One	November 14, 2025	Treyarch, Raven Software	Activision	
Call of Duty: Black Ops 7	Xbox Series X/S	November 14, 2025	Treyarch, Raven Software	Activision	
Candy Crush Crushable	Browser	January 29, 2026	King	King	
Fallout 4	Nintendo Switch 2	February 24, 2026	Bethesda Game Studios	Bethesda Softworks	
Towerborne	Windows	February 26, 2026	Stoic	Xbox Game Studios	
Towerborne	PlayStation 5	February 26, 2026	Stoic	Xbox Game Studios	
Towerborne	Xbox Series X/S	February 26, 2026	Stoic	Xbox Game Studios	
Overwatch	Nintendo Switch 2	April 14, 2026	Blizzard Entertainment	Blizzard Entertainment	
Kiln	Windows	April 23, 2026	Double Fine	Xbox Game Studios	
Kiln	PlayStation 5	April 23, 2026	Double Fine	Xbox Game Studios	
Kiln	Xbox Series X/S	April 23, 2026	Double Fine	Xbox Game Studios	
Forza Horizon 6	Windows	May 19, 2026	Playground Games	Xbox Game Studios	
Forza Horizon 6	Xbox Series X/S	May 19, 2026	Playground Games	Xbox Game Studios	
Forza Horizon 6	PlayStation 5	January 26, 2027	Playground Games	Xbox Game Studios	
Call of Duty: Black Ops	PlayStation 4	July 9, 2026	Treyarch, Iron Galaxy	Activision	
Call of Duty: Black Ops	PlayStation 5	July 9, 2026	Treyarch, Iron Galaxy	Activision	
Call of Duty: Black Ops II	PlayStation 4	July 9, 2026	Treyarch, Iron Galaxy	Activision	
Call of Duty: Black Ops II	PlayStation 5	July 9, 2026	Treyarch, Iron Galaxy	Activision	
Halo: Campaign Evolved	Windows	July 28, 2026	Halo Studios	Xbox Game Studios	
Halo: Campaign Evolved	PlayStation 5	July 28, 2026	Halo Studios	Xbox Game Studios	
Halo: Campaign Evolved	Xbox Series X/S	July 28, 2026	Halo Studios	Xbox Game Studios	
Diablo IV: Age of Hatred Collection	Nintendo Switch 2	September 15, 2026	Blizzard Entertainment	Blizzard Entertainment	
Minecraft Dungeons II	Windows	September 29, 2026	Mojang Studios, Double Eleven	Xbox Game Studios	
Minecraft Dungeons II	Nintendo Switch	September 29, 2026	Mojang Studios, Double Eleven	Xbox Game Studios	
Minecraft Dungeons II	Nintendo Switch 2	September 29, 2026	Mojang Studios, Double Eleven	Xbox Game Studios	
Minecraft Dungeons II	PlayStation 5	September 29, 2026	Mojang Studios, Double Eleven	Xbox Game Studios	
Minecraft Dungeons II	Xbox Series X/S	September 29, 2026	Mojang Studios, Double Eleven	Xbox Game Studios	
Gears of War: E-Day	Windows	October 6, 2026	The Coalition, People Can Fly	Xbox Game Studios	
Gears of War: E-Day	Xbox Series X/S	October 6, 2026	The Coalition, People Can Fly	Xbox Game Studios	
Call of Duty: Modern Warfare 4	Nintendo Switch 2	October 23, 2026	Infinity Ward	Activision	
Call of Duty: Modern Warfare 4	Windows	October 23, 2026	Infinity Ward	Activision	
Call of Duty: Modern Warfare 4	PlayStation 5	October 23, 2026	Infinity Ward	Activision	
Call of Duty: Modern Warfare 4	Xbox Series X/S	October 23, 2026	Infinity Ward	Activision	
World of Warcraft: Forever	Windows	November 4, 2026	Blizzard Entertainment	Blizzard Entertainment	
World of Warcraft: Forever	macOS	November 4, 2026	Blizzard Entertainment	Blizzard Entertainment	
Fable	Windows	February 23, 2027	Playground Games	Xbox Game Studios	
Fable	PlayStation 5	February 23, 2027	Playground Games	Xbox Game Studios	
Fable	Xbox Series X/S	February 23, 2027	Playground Games	Xbox Game Studios	
Clockwork Revolution	Windows	2027	inXile Entertainment	Xbox Game Studios	
Clockwork Revolution	Xbox Series X/S	2027	inXile Entertainment	Xbox Game Studios	
Spyro: A Realm Beyond	Nintendo Switch 2	2027	Toys for Bob	Activision	
Spyro: A Realm Beyond	Windows	2027	Toys for Bob	Activision	
Spyro: A Realm Beyond	PlayStation 5	2027	Toys for Bob	Activision	
Spyro: A Realm Beyond	Xbox Series X/S	2027	Toys for Bob	Activision	
Diablo V	TBA	2029	Blizzard Entertainment	Blizzard Entertainment	
Starcraft	TBA	2030	Blizzard Entertainment	Blizzard Entertainment	
Overwatch Rush	TBA	TBA	Blizzard Entertainment	Blizzard Entertainment	
OD	TBA	TBA	Kojima Productions	Xbox Game Studios	
Physint	TBA	TBA	Kojima Productions	Xbox Game Studios	
The Elder Scrolls VI: Sentinel	TBA	TBA	Bethesda Game Studios	Bethesda Softworks	
Fallout 5	TBA	TBA	Bethesda Game Studios	Bethesda Softworks	
Fallout 3 Remastered	TBA	TBA	Bethesda Game Studios	Bethesda Softworks	
Fallout: New Vegas Remastered	TBA	TBA	Bethesda Game Studios	Bethesda Softworks	
Untitled Fallout game	TBA	TBA	Obsidian Entertainment, Bethesda Game Studios	Bethesda Softworks	
Wolfenstein 3	TBA	TBA	MachineGames	Bethesda Softworks	
Untitled game	TBA	TBA	id Software	Bethesda Softworks	
Untitled narrative-based AAA game	TBA	TBA	Elsewhere Entertainment	Activision	
Untitled Halo game	TBA	TBA	Activision	Activision	
Minecraft Blast	TBA	TBA	King, Mojang Studios	King	

== Expansions/DLCs ==
Game	Expansion/DLC	Platform(s)	Release date	Developer(s)	Publisher	Ref
World of Warcraft	The War Within	Windows, macOS	August 26, 2024	Blizzard Entertainment	Blizzard Entertainment	
World of Warcraft	Midnight	Windows, macOS	March 2, 2026	Blizzard Entertainment	Blizzard Entertainment	
World of Warcraft	The Last Titan	Windows, macOS	2027	Blizzard Entertainment	Blizzard Entertainment	
Warcraft III: Reforged	Forsaken Kingdom	Windows, macOS	September 12, 2026	Blizzard Entertainment	Blizzard Entertainment	
Diablo IV	Vessel of Hatred	Windows, macOS, PlayStation 4, PlayStation 5, Xbox One, Xbox Series X/S	October 7, 2024	Blizzard Entertainment	Blizzard Entertainment	
Diablo IV	Lord of Hatred	Windows, macOS, PlayStation 4, PlayStation 5, Xbox One, Xbox Series X/S	April 28, 2026	Blizzard Entertainment	Blizzard Entertainment	
Diablo II: Resurrected	Reign of the Warlock	Windows, macOS, PlayStation 4, PlayStation 5, Xbox One, Xbox Series X/S, Nintendo Switch	February 11, 2026	Blizzard Entertainment	Blizzard Entertainment	
Hearthstone	Showdown In Badlands	Windows, macOS, iOS, Android	November 14, 2023	Blizzard Entertainment	Blizzard Entertainment	
Hearthstone	Whizbang's Workshop	Windows, macOS, iOS, Android	March 19, 2024	Blizzard Entertainment	Blizzard Entertainment	
Hearthstone	Perils in Paradise	Windows, macOS, iOS, Android	July 23, 2024	Blizzard Entertainment	Blizzard Entertainment	
Hearthstone	The Great Dark Beyond	Windows, macOS, iOS, Android	November 5, 2024	Blizzard Entertainment	Blizzard Entertainment	
Hearthstone	The Lost City of Un’Goro	Windows, macOS, iOS, Android	July 8, 2025	Blizzard Entertainment	Blizzard Entertainment	
Hearthstone	Across the Timeways	Windows, macOS, iOS, Android	November 4, 2025	Blizzard Entertainment	Blizzard Entertainment	
Hearthstone	Cataclysm	Windows, macOS, iOS, Android	March 17, 2026	Blizzard Entertainment	Blizzard Entertainment	
Hearthstone	Escape from Violet Hold	Windows, macOS, iOS, Android	July 7, 2026	Blizzard Entertainment	Blizzard Entertainment	
Hearthstone	Reign of the Black Empire	Windows, macOS, iOS, Android	October 20, 2026	Blizzard Entertainment	Blizzard Entertainment	
The Elder Scrolls Online	High Isle	Windows, macOS	June 6, 2022	ZeniMax Online Studios	Bethesda Softworks	
The Elder Scrolls Online	High Isle	PlayStation 4, PlayStation 5, Xbox One, Xbox Series X/S	June 21, 2022	ZeniMax Online Studios	Bethesda Softworks	
The Elder Scrolls Online	Necrom	Windows, macOS	June 5, 2023	ZeniMax Online Studios	Bethesda Softworks	
The Elder Scrolls Online	Necrom	PlayStation 4, PlayStation 5, Xbox One, Xbox Series X/S	June 20, 2023	ZeniMax Online Studios	Bethesda Softworks	
The Elder Scrolls Online	Gold Road	Windows, macOS	June 3, 2024	ZeniMax Online Studios	Bethesda Softworks	
The Elder Scrolls Online	Gold Road	PlayStation 4, PlayStation 5, Xbox One, Xbox Series X/S	June 18, 2024	ZeniMax Online Studios	Bethesda Softworks	
Indiana Jones and the Great Circle	The Order of Giants	Windows, PlayStation 5, Xbox Series X/S, Nintendo Switch 2	September 4, 2025	MachineGames	Bethesda Softworks	
Doom: The Dark Ages	Revelations	Windows, PlayStation 5, Xbox Series X/S	July 7, 2026	id Software	Bethesda Softworks	
Starfield	Shattered Space	Windows, Xbox Series X/S, PlayStation 5	September 30, 2024	Bethesda Game Studios	Bethesda Softworks	
Starfield	Terran Armada	Windows, Xbox Series X/S, PlayStation 5	April 7, 2026	Bethesda Game Studios	Bethesda Softworks	
Starfield	Starborn	Windows, Xbox Series X/S, PlayStation 5	2027	Bethesda Game Studios	Bethesda Softworks	
Fallout 76	Raven Rock	Windows, PlayStation 5, Xbox One, Xbox Series X/S	2027	Bethesda Game Studios	Bethesda Softworks	
Age of Empires II	Dynasties of India	Windows, PlayStation 5, Xbox One, Xbox Series X/S	April 28, 2022	World's Edge, Forgotten Empires, Relic Entertainment	Xbox Game Studios	
Age of Empires II	The Mountain Royals	Windows, PlayStation 5, Xbox One, Xbox Series X/S	October 31, 2023	World's Edge, Forgotten Empires, Relic Entertainment	Xbox Game Studios	
Age of Empires II	Victors and Vanquished	Windows, PlayStation 5, Xbox One, Xbox Series X/S	March 14, 2024	World's Edge, Forgotten Empires, Relic Entertainment	Xbox Game Studios	
Age of Empires II	Chronicles: Battle for Greece	Windows, PlayStation 5, Xbox One, Xbox Series X/S	November 14, 2024	World's Edge, Forgotten Empires, Relic Entertainment	Xbox Game Studios	
Age of Empires II	The Three Kingdoms	Windows, PlayStation 5, Xbox One, Xbox Series X/S	May 6, 2025	World's Edge, Forgotten Empires, Relic Entertainment	Xbox Game Studios	
Age of Empires II	Chronicles: Alexander the Great	Windows, PlayStation 5, Xbox One, Xbox Series X/S	October 14, 2025	World's Edge, Forgotten Empires, Relic Entertainment	Xbox Game Studios	
Age of Empires II	The Last Chieftains	Windows, PlayStation 5, Xbox One, Xbox Series X/S	February 17, 2026	World's Edge, Forgotten Empires, Relic Entertainment	Xbox Game Studios	
Age of Empires II	The Viking Sagas	Windows, PlayStation 5, Xbox One, Xbox Series X/S	September 22, 2026	World's Edge, Forgotten Empires, Relic Entertainment	Xbox Game Studios	
Age of Empires IV	The Sultans Ascend	Windows, PlayStation 5, Xbox One, Xbox Series X/S	November 14, 2023	World's Edge, Forgotten Empires, Relic Entertainment	Xbox Game Studios	
Age of Empires IV	Knights of Cross and Rose	Windows, PlayStation 5, Xbox One, Xbox Series X/S	April 8, 2025	World's Edge, Forgotten Empires, Relic Entertainment	Xbox Game Studios	
Age of Empires IV	Dynasties of the East	Windows, PlayStation 5, Xbox One, Xbox Series X/S	November 4, 2025	World's Edge, Forgotten Empires, Relic Entertainment	Xbox Game Studios	
Age of Empires IV	Yue Fei’s Legacy	Windows, PlayStation 5, Xbox One, Xbox Series X/S	May 7, 2026	World's Edge, Forgotten Empires, Relic Entertainment	Xbox Game Studios	
Age of Empires IV	Raiders of the North	Windows, PlayStation 5, Xbox One, Xbox Series X/S	October 29, 2026	World's Edge, Forgotten Empires, Relic Entertainment	Xbox Game Studios	
Age of Mythology: Retold	Immortal Pillars	Windows, PlayStation 5, Xbox Series X/S	March 4, 2025	World's Edge, Forgotten Empires, Relic Entertainment	Xbox Game Studios	
Age of Mythology: Retold	Heavenly Spear	Windows, PlayStation 5, Xbox Series X/S	September 30, 2025	World's Edge, Forgotten Empires, Relic Entertainment	Xbox Game Studios	
Age of Mythology: Retold	Obsidian Mirror	Windows, PlayStation 5, Xbox Series X/S	April 21, 2026	World's Edge, Forgotten Empires, Relic Entertainment	Xbox Game Studios	
Age of Empires III	Knights of the Mediterranean	Windows	May 26, 2022	World's Edge, Forgotten Empires, Relic Entertainment	Xbox Game Studios	
Age of Empires III	The Baltic Powers	Windows	September 10, 2026	World's Edge, Forgotten Empires, Relic Entertainment	Xbox Game Studios	
Forza Horizon 5	Hot Wheels	Windows, PlayStation 5, Xbox One, Xbox Series X/S	July 19, 2022	Playground Games	Xbox Game Studios	
Forza Horizon 5	Rally Adventure	Windows, PlayStation 5, Xbox One, Xbox Series X/S	March 29, 2023	Playground Games	Xbox Game Studios	
Forza Horizon 6	Untitled expansion	Windows, Xbox Series X/S, PlayStation 5	2027	Playground Games	Xbox Game Studios	
Fable	Order of the Hero	Windows, Xbox Series X/S, PlayStation 5	2027	Playground Games	Xbox Game Studios	
The Outer Worlds 2	Side Effects Guaranteed	Windows, Xbox Series X/S, PlayStation 5	December 2, 2026	Obsidian Entertainment	Xbox Game Studios	
The Outer Worlds 2	Untitled DLC	Windows, Xbox Series X/S, PlayStation 5	2027	Obsidian Entertainment	Xbox Game Studios	
Ninja Gaiden 4	The Two Masters	Windows, Xbox Series X/S, PlayStation 5	March 4, 2026	Team Ninja, PlatinumGames	Xbox Game Studios	
Minecraft Dungeons II	The Humblers Awaken	Nintendo Switch, Nintendo Switch 2, Windows, Xbox Series X/S, PlayStation 5	December 1, 2026	Mojang Studios	Xbox Game Studios	

== See also ==
- List of Xbox studios
- Xbox
- List of Xbox Game Studios video games
- List of Bethesda Softworks video games
- List of Activision video games
- List of Blizzard Entertainment video games
- List of King video games
- XP (division)
