= The Winner's Circle =

The Winner's Circle may refer to:

- The Winner's Circle (1948 film), an American drama film
- The Winner's Circle (1950 film), a French drama film

== See also ==
- Winner's Circle, a 1958 jazz album by jazz musicians
- Glossary of North American horse racing#Winner's circle
- Mary-Kate and Ashley: Winners Circle, a 2001 video game
