= Xbx =

XBX or xbx may refer to:

== Places ==
- Postal code for Ta' Xbiex, Malta

== Other uses ==
- XBX, Ten Basic Exercises, one of the Royal Canadian Air Force Exercise Plans
- ISO 639 code for Kabixí language, a spurious language

== See also ==
- Xbox (disambiguation)
- BX (disambiguation)
- XB (disambiguation)
- IEEE 802.1xbx MAC Security Key Agreement protocol, an IEEE 802.1 standard
- Martin B-10 (formerly XB-10), a 1930s American bomber
