= Xbox (disambiguation) =

Xbox is a video gaming brand created by Microsoft.

Xbox may also refer to:

== Game consoles ==
- Xbox (console), a video game console from Microsoft, which was first released in 2001
- Xbox 360, a 2005 video game console and the Xbox's successor
- Xbox One, a 2013 video game console and the Xbox 360's successor
  - Xbox One X, a 2017 video game console, the high-end revision of the Xbox One
- Xbox Series X and Series S, a 2020 video game console line and the Xbox One's successors

== Game and media services ==
- Xbox network, the online gaming service (originally called Xbox Live) used by the Xbox consoles, Windows PCs, and Windows Phone
- Xbox (app), an app for Android, iOS, Windows, and Tizen
- Xbox (division), the video game and digital entertainment division of Microsoft (formerly called Microsoft Gaming)
- Xbox Music, a digital music service by Microsoft and successor to Zune
- Xbox Video, a digital video service by Microsoft
- Xbox Game Studios

== Other uses ==
- Xbox, Yucatán, Mexico

== See also ==
- Official Xbox Magazine
- X terminal
- List of Xbox video games
- List of Xbox studios
- The TV Wheel, a TV pilot created by Joel Hodgson that originally went under the title "X-Box"
