= Age of Mythology: Retold =

2024 video game

- Developers: World's Edge (Note: Additional development work by Tantalus Media, CaptureAge, and Virtuos); Forgotten Empires
- Publisher: Xbox Game Studios
- Director: Adam Isgreen
- Producer: Danielle Pino
- Designer: Kristen Pirillo
- Programmer: Mike Robbins
- Artist: Melinda Rose
- Writers: Cédric Van de Sande; Ben Angell; Megan Quinn
- Series: Age of Empires
- Platforms: Windows; Xbox Series X/S; PlayStation 5
- Release: Windows, Series X/S; September 4, 2024; PlayStation 5; March 4, 2025 (Note: The Premium Edition of the game was released on February 27, 2025, with 5-days head starts before it releases March 4, 2025.)
- Genre: Real-time strategy
- Modes: Single-player, multiplayer

Age of Mythology: Retold is a real-time strategy video game developed by World's Edge, Tantalus Media, and Forgotten Empires and published by Xbox Game Studios. It serves as a remastered version of Age of Mythology, originally developed by Ensemble Studios and released in 2002. It was first revealed on October 25, 2022. The game was released on September 4, 2024, for Windows and Xbox Series X/S. The game received generally positive reviews from critics.

== Gameplay ==
Top-down view of an Atlantean town in the game

Age of Mythology: Retold combines elements of the original game with modern real-time strategy design and visuals. Built using Age of Empires III: Definitive Edition's version of the Bang Engine, all units and animations were completely redone for the remake. The remake features a new fully symphonic version of the original soundtrack, featuring numerous tweaks and modernizations, and offering more options for players.

Players can choose mythological gods from the Greek, Norse, Egyptian, Atlantean, and with DLC, the Chinese, Japanese, and Aztec pantheons, using their powers to summon powerful creatures and cast spells against their enemies. The game features a 50-mission campaign that takes players across various mythical worlds, including locations such as Troy, Midgard, and Egypt. Retold's base release only included the Greek, Egyptian, Norse, and Atlantean cultures, excluding content from the Tale of the Dragon expansion, unlike the Definitive Edition re-releases of Age of Empires, II, and III, which included all previously released official content at launch. However, a reenvisioned Chinese pantheon was released as a DLC expansion for the game, Immortal Pillars, on March 4, 2025. Two new pantheons, Japanese and Aztec, were released with other DLC expansions, with Heavenly Spear including the former and being released on September 30, 2025, and Obsidian Mirror including the latter and being released on April 21, 2026. Players can command units inspired by world mythologies, such as Centaurs, Trolls, Mummies, and Cyclops.

Myth unit abilities can be activated by players at will, rather than automatically cast by the unit. A unit's charged ability can also be set to trigger automatically, similar to the original game. The favor cap of 100 is changed or removed. God powers are now multi-use with cooldowns, and reusing god powers costs favor. A new Wonder Age introduces cheaper god power casting, though its relation to the current Titan Age is unclarified. An auto-economy feature is added through systems such as Villager Priority. Resource drop site foundations can be selected from a resource's command panel, and when placed, a nearby idle Villager will be automatically tasked to it. The population limit is increased, and the game now includes ray tracing. Hotkey buttons are displayed on icons in the command panel, while crush armor, reload time, and attack multipliers are shown next to other unit/building attributes in the information panel. The Scenario Editor has a text filter option to find objects faster, and all upgraded myth units have unique visuals. Additionally, the game notifies the player when approaching the population space capacity.

== Development ==
Release timeline Age of Mythology: Retold release history
2024	Age of Mythology: Retold
2024	New Gods Pack: Freyr
2025	Immortal Pillars
2025	Heavenly Spear
2026	New Gods Pack: Demeter
2026	Obsidian Mirror

Age of Mythology: Retold was co-developed by World's Edge, Forgotten Empires, Tantalus Media, CaptureAge, and Virtuos Games.

The game was announced on October 25, 2022. World's Edge announced the game's release date on June 9, 2024, at the Xbox Summer Showcase. It was released for Windows and Xbox Series X/S on September 4, 2024. A PlayStation 5 version was released on March 4, 2025, alongside the release of the Immortal Pillars expansion. This also marks this game as the second game in the Age of Empires series to be released on Sony platforms since Age of Empires II was released by Konami in 2001.

The beta version of the game was made available to play to those who had pre-bought the premium edition from July 12–14, 2024.

== Reception ==
Reception

Aggregate scores
Aggregator	Score
Metacritic	(PC) 83/100 (XSXS) 79/100
OpenCritic	86% recommend

Review scores
Publication	Score
Hardcore Gamer	3.5/5
PC Gamer (US)	75/100
PCGamesN	8/10
Shacknews	7/10

According to review aggregator Metacritic, Age of Mythology: Retold was received "generally favourable" based on 28 critic reviews for PC and 7 critic reviews for Xbox Series X. As per OpenCritic, 86% of the 34 critic reviews recommend the game.

PCGamesN complimented the enhanced UI, describing it as clearer and more vibrant while offering a more user-friendly experience. Criticism was aimed at the upgraded visuals; some players may find the new detailed art lacks the original's charm and feels too generic. Windows Central commented positively on the enhanced visuals and the faithful recreation of the audio and soundtrack. They also noted the improvements in gameplay and the range of accessibility options. Some criticism was directed at pathfinding issues and a few bugs and glitches.

=== Awards ===
The game received a nomination as "Best Microsoft Xbox Game" at the Gamescom Awards 2024. It was nominated for "Best Sim/Strategy Game" at The Game Awards 2024.
