= Pony Friends 2 =

2010 video game

- Developer(s): Tantalus Media; Eidos Shanghai
- Publisher(s): Eidos Interactive (PAL); Square Enix (North America)
- Platform(s): Nintendo DS, Wii, Microsoft Windows
- Release: PAL: November 20, 2009; NA: February 23, 2010 (DS, Wii)
- Genre(s): Simulation
- Mode(s): Single-player

Pony Friends 2 is a simulation game developed by Tantalus Media and published by Eidos Interactive for Nintendo DS, Wii, and Windows PC.

== Gameplay ==
Ponies can be customized by players for all aspects of their appearance, trade horses with other players, and can train their horse for competition against other players in races and "pony trick championships" if they have a Nintendo DS or Nintendo Wii through "single cart play", which allows players with only one game cartridge to play multiplayer with friends. Twelve breeds of horse are available, and each different horse created has its own personality. The Nintendo DS version allows players to use the built in microphone to talk to their horse and have it respond to their voice. Accessories can also be chosen for the horse, and custom ones can also be created. Part of the simulation is also feeding and grooming the horse. Players can also take the horse through various landscapes and trails, take screenshots of wildlife along the way, and unlock various hidden game content.

== Development ==
The original Pony Friends was published by Eidos Interactive, but after its acquisition by Square Enix, the title was published under the new owners name. The game was first announced at Gamecom 2009 in a joint Eidos-Square Enix conference. Horse riding has been improved to become more intuitive compared to the original title. Mat Bettinson, Business Development Manager for Tantalus Media, commented on an article at gamindustry.biz related to game marketing versus reviews and their influence on game sales; he stated that publisher Eidos commissioned an ad for Pony Friends 2 and was of a very high quality, despite assertions in the article that "outsiders" to the gaming industry rarely made good advertisements.

== Reception ==
Digital Spy compared the game unfavorably to other titles due for Christmas 2009, saying it was a very niche game geared only toward "six year old pony fanatics", and that others would find it boring.
