= Pony Friends =

2007 video game

- Developer: Tantalus Media
- Publisher: Eidos Interactive
- Platform: Nintendo DS
- Release: EU: May 18, 2007; NA: May 30, 2007; AU: June 1, 2007
- Genre: Simulation
- Mode: Single-player

Pony Friends is a simulation video game developed by Tantalus Media and published by Eidos Interactive for Nintendo DS in 2007. A sequel, Pony Friends 2, was released in 2009.

== Gameplay ==
The player acquires horses which can be ridden down trails. Various tasks and missions can be undertaken, such as photographing animals, daily chores, horse racing, and unlocking further trails. In-game collectables include saddles, bridles, blankets, horseshoes, mane and tail styles, shells and coin sets. These can be bought at the in-game store, found on the trails, or obtained by completing tasks. The horses need to be kept clean and can get sick if not looked after.

The game can be played entirely using the stylus.

== Reception ==
Reception

Aggregate score
Aggregator	Score
Metacritic	67/100

Review scores
Publication	Score
Eurogamer	6/10
Famitsu	20/40
GamesMaster	52%
IGN	7/10
Jeuxvideo.com	12/20
NGamer	70%
VideoGamer.com	7/10

The game received "mixed or average" reviews according to the review aggregation website Metacritic. In Japan, where the game was ported and published by Starfish SD on June 19, 2008, under the name Watashi no Pony (わたしのポニー, Watashi no Ponī), Famitsu gave it a score of one four, two fives, and one six for a total of 20 out of 40.

Pony Friends sold one million copies.
