= Blindlight =

American production services company

Blindlight, LLC
- Type: Subsidiary
- Industry: Video games
- Founded: 2000; 26 years ago
- Founders: Lev Chapelsky; Matt Case; Rich Dickerson; Dawn Hershey
- Headquarters: Los Angeles, US
- Parent: Keywords Studios (2018–present)
- Website: blindlight.com

Blindlight, LLC is a Los Angeles-based company providing Hollywood production services to the video game industry. Notable properties the company has contributed to include the Elder Scrolls, Fallout, Guild Wars, Splinter Cell, Tomb Raider, Destiny, and Halo series. It was acquired by Keywords Studios in June 2018.

== Background ==
Formed in 2000 by four managers from Icebox.com, Blindlight sought to apply the talents and expertise from Hollywood's film and television industries to the video game industry. The company's initial service disciplines included casting and voice production, celebrity acquisition, story and scriptwriting, music production, motion capture and sound design. While its contractors are sourced mostly from traditional Hollywood industries, Blindlight operates exclusively as a service provider to videogame companies.

Before technological advances brought about the advent of the PlayStation 2 and the original Xbox in 2001, many games were written and voiced by computer artists and "programmers around the office." The newfound potential for delivering richer multimedia experiences through videogames instigated the need for contributions from traditional Hollywood resources such as actors, writers, and composers. Blindlight sought to elevate the filmic aspects of videogames by developing ways for game producers to take advantage of the distributed freelance specialists that comprise the modern-day Hollywood production model.

In December 2003, the company moved its headquarters to its current location on the Sunset Strip. In 2004, Blindlight opened an office in Tokyo, Japan.

In July 2024, voice actors, motion capture employees and other people employed by Blindlight who were Screen Actors Guild-American Federation of Television and Radio Artists (SAG-AFTRA) members would begin a labor strike over concerns about A.I.

== Industry contributions ==
Blindlight's filmography on IMDb lists more game credits for voice production than any other company, and according to a GDC profile on the company, "its client list has grown to include 19 of the top 20 game publishers." Blindlight's voicework has earned industry awards including Best Dialog of the Year, Best Performance by a Human Male, and Performance of the Year. The company is known for producing the voicework on such prominent games as The Elder Scrolls V: Skyrim, which won an AIAS award for Outstanding Achievement in Story and Game of the Year, and Dishonored, which was recognized by BAFTA as the Best Game of 2012.

Other notable achievements include:

- Blindlight was an early company to advocate using professional Hollywood actors in games. This started a shift in videogame voice-over production that effectively moved the discipline to Los Angeles, CA.
- Blindlight has drafted and brokered over 500 deals for the use of celebrity voices in games. In 2006, Blindlight signed all Star Trek captains to one game, marking the only time all five have participated together on a single project. In 2009, the blogosphere buzzed when word got out that Blindlight had made an offer to former President Bill Clinton to play the President role in Fallout 3.
- Blindlight has participated in negotiations with the SAG and AFTRA actors unions over the Interactive Media Agreement. In 2005, Blindlight assisted in averting a strike and preserving the game industry's access to professional actors.
- In gamewriting, Blindlight borrowed best practices from the television industry to create an outsourced team-based model for improving the narrative elements in games. This opened new doors for game producers to tap underutilized Hollywood writing talent at affordable costs, and a new source of work for Hollywood writers.
- Blindlight brought ex-Beatle Paul McCartney on board to create and produce original music for the score of Bungie's cornerstone franchise, Destiny.
- Blindlight created an original mobile app for William Shatner that was rated as the best celebrity app in the marketplace by both Buzzfeed, and Gizmodo.
