= Keywords Studios =

Irish video game services company

Keywords Studios plc
- Formerly: Keywords International Limited (1998–2013)
- Type: Subsidiary
- Industry: Video games
- Founded: 1998; 28 years ago
- Founders: Giorgio Guastalla; Teresa Luppino
- Headquarters: Leopardstown, Ireland
- Key people: Bertrand Bodson (CEO); Jon Hauck (COO); Robert Kingston (CFO)
- Revenue: ▲€780.445 million (2023)
- Operating income: ▼€46.830 million (2023)
- Net income: ▼€19.952 million (2023)
- Total assets: ▲€599.039 million (2023)
- Total equity: ▲€599.039 million (2023)
- Number of employees: ▲12,340 (2023)
- Parent: EQT AB (51%; 2024–present)
- Subsidiaries: See § Operations
- Website: keywordsstudios.com

Keywords Studios plc is an Irish video game industry services company based in Leopardstown. Founded in 1998 by Giorgio Guastalla and Teresa Luppino, the company initially provided localisation services for business software before transitioning to the video game industry. Andrew Day replaced Guastalla as the chief executive officer in 2009, and the company completed its initial public offering on the London Stock Exchange in 2013. Since then, Keywords Studios has acquired several other companies, including Certain Affinity, Blindlight, Climax Studios, Forgotten Empires, GameSim, Heavy Iron Studios, High Voltage Software, Tantalus Media, and Wicked Workshop. In October 2024, Keywords Studios was acquired by a group of investors led by EQT AB.

== History ==
Giorgio Guastalla, an Italian-Irish businessman who had previously worked for Microsoft's Dublin office, founded Keywords Studios in 1998 with his wife, Teresa Luppino. The company was established in Leopardstown (a suburb of Dublin) under the name Keywords International and originally provided localisation services for business software. A regional office in Rome was established in 2001.

Starting in 2004, Keywords International became incrementally involved with the video game industry. Andrew Day, a Johannesburg native and longtime friend of Guastalla, joined the company in March 2009 at Guastalla's request and became its chief executive officer (CEO). At this time, Keywords International had 50 employees and revenues of €3.5 million. Day perceived the supplier side of the video game market as highly fragmented and intended to turn Keywords International into a "one-stop shop" for various stages of video game development. He further aimed to reduce the company's significant reliance on a single client. Day instituted a five-year plan that shifted the company's focus entirely towards video games and was to lead to an initial public offering in 2014. The previously major client significantly reduced its business with Keywords International in 2010. Further regional offices were opened in Tokyo in December 2009, in Montreal in 2010, and in Seattle in 2012.

In June 2013, Keywords International announced its intent to float and sell 56% of its shares on the Alternative Investment Market of the London Stock Exchange. By this time, the company had 120 employees and a pre-tax profit of €2.74 million on revenues of €14.34 million. In this process, Keywords Studios Limited was incorporated in the United Kingdom. On 8 July, it was renamed Keywords Studios plc and wholly acquired Keywords International. Numis Securities served as the financial adviser and ran the offer, and Keywords Studios floated on 12 July, raising £28 million. Ross Graham was subsequently brought on as the chairman. Before the flotation, PEQ Holdings (a company associated with Guastalla, Giacomo Duranti, and Marco De Sanctis) owned 75.1% of the shares, with Day holding the remaining 24.9%. The flotation reduced PEQ Holdings's ownership to 29.9% and Day's to 13.2%. Cazenove Capital Management acquired 12% of the company, alongside other investments by Artemis and Legal & General.

With the initial public offering completed, Day envisioned an acquisition-based approach to grow Keywords Studios. Liquid Violet, a provider of voice production services, was its first purchase in January 2014. At the end of 2016, Keywords Studios had 2,600 employees, including 120 at its Dublin headquarters. The acquisition of VMC in October 2017 added 1,300 employees to Keywords Studios's headcount. According to Davy Group, this acquisition turned Keywords Studios into the largest provider of quality assurance. In July 2018, the company announced the creation of Keywords Ventures, a venture capital fund aimed at supporting startups. Keywords Studios acquired 45% of AppSecTest as its first investment under this fund. In the same month, Igor Efremov was hired as the chief creative officer and Andrew Brown as the chief marketing officer. Jon Hauck was brought on as Keywords Studios's chief financial officer (CFO) in November 2019, replacing David Broderick after he had announced his resignation. At the onset of the COVID-19 pandemic in 2020, Day and Hauck took a 20% pay cut. Staff criticised the company's handling of the pandemic, stating that operations had remained largely unchanged despite health concerns. In May of that year, the company raised £100 million to acquire firms weakened by the pandemic.

In January 2021, Keywords Studios hired Sonia Lashand Sedler as its chief operating officer (COO). Citing health reasons, Day took a temporary leave in March 2021, with Hauck and Sedler becoming joint interim CEOs. In June, Keywords Studios announced Day's impending retirement and that he had formally stepped down as the CEO and as a member of the board of directors, remaining in an advisory role for six months. Bertrand Bodson, the former chief digital officer for Novartis, succeeded Day on 1 December 2021. In January 2022, Guastalla stepped down as a non-executive director of Keywords Studios to focus on his other businesses. He was followed shortly by Sedler, who left the company in March 2022, citing personal reasons. Graham unexpectedly died in March 2023. As he had been due to retire later that month, the non-executive director Don Robert had already been designated as his replacement. Hauck succeeded Sedler as COO on 1 July 2023, while Robert Kingston was hired as the CFO. Kingston had previously acted in that role for the UK and Ireland division of Flutter Entertainment.

Alongside the companies Active Fence, Take This, and Modulate, Keywords Studios established the Gaming Safety Coalition in March 2024 to improve mental health practices in online gaming. In May 2024, Keywords Studios announced it would accept a takeover offer from the Swedish investment firm EQT AB of £25.50 in cash per share for a total of £2.2 billion. The offer was a 73% premium on the previous share price of £14.70, which rose to £23.78 following the announcement. The final deal for £24.50 per share was announced in July and was pending shareholder approval. In the proposal, EQT would acquire 51% of the company, while Temasek and CPP Investments would each obtain 24.5%. The transaction was announced as completed on 24 October, and Keywords Studios was delisted from the London Stock Exchange. In September 2026, Ichi, KWM (the 2021 merger of Fire Without Smoke's Montreal office and Sunny Side Up), Fire Without Smoke, G-Net, TrailerFarm, Maverick Media, and Big Farmer were combined into one unit called FreeAnimal.

== Corporate affairs ==
Keywords Studios is headquartered at Whelan House in the South County Business Park in Leopardstown. In September 2017, the company leased the entire ground floor and parts of the first and lower ground floors of Whelan House for €422,722. Italicatessen, a food import business founded by Guastalla and Luppino in 2002, provides catering services for Keywords Studios's headquarters. As of 2023, Keywords Studios employs 12,340 people.

== Operations ==
Day stated that not releasing products under the Keywords Studios name contributes to it staying "under the radar". The company's businesses are divided into seven segments: art, engineering, functional testing, audio recording, translation, localisation, and player support.

List of acquisitions by Keywords Studios
Name	Acquired	Business	Ref(s).
Liquid Violet	January 2014	Voice production	
Babel Media	February 2014	Localisation and localisation testing	
Binari Sonori	May 2014	Localisation	
Lakshya Digital	October 2014	Art services	
Alchemic Dream	January 2015	Customer care	
Reverb Localização	January 2015	Localisation	
Kite Team	July 2015 (50%; remainder acquired in April 2016)	Localisation	
Liquid Development	August 2015	Art services	
Ankama Asia	March 2016	Operations support	
Synthesis Group	April 2016	Localisation and audio	
Mindwalk Studios	May 2016	Art services	
Volta Creation	July 2016	Visual development and art services	
Player Research	October 2016	Consultation and user testing	
Enzyme Testing Labs	November 2016	Localisation and quality assurance	
Sonox Audio Solutions	December 2016	Localisation	
Spov	February 2017	Art services	
XLOC	May 2017	Web-based content management; XLOC platform	
GameSim	May 2017	Development	
Red Hot	May 2017	Art services	
La Marque Rose	August 2017	Audio recording	
Asrec	August 2017	Audio recording	
Dune Sound	August 2017	Audio recording	
Around the Word	August 2017	Localisation	
D3T	October 2017	Development	
VMC	October 2017	Localisation and quality assurance	
Sperasoft	December 2017	Development	
Localizadora Latam (LOLA)	December 2017	Audio localisation	
Maximal Studio	March 2018	Voice-over recording	
Cord Worldwide	April 2018	Music branding	
Laced Music	April 2018	Record label	
Fire Without Smoke	May 2018	Development	
Blindlight	June 2018	Production services	
Snowed In Studios	July 2018	Development	
Yokozuna Data	July 2018	Predictive analytics	
Studio Gobo	August 2018	Development	
Electric Square	August 2018	Technical services	
Sound Lab	September 2018	Immersive entertainment	
The TrailerFarm	September 2018	Trailer production	
Sunny Side Up	December 2018	Marketing	
GetSocial	February 2019	User acquisition	
Wizcorp	April 2019	Development	
Descriptive Video Works	June 2019	Audio descriptions	
TV+Synchron	September 2019	Voice-over recording	
Ichi	December 2019	Creative and marketing	
KantanMT	December 2019	Machine translations	
Syllabes	December 2019	Audio recording	
Marching Cube	January 2020	Development	
Coconut Lizard	June 2020	Development	
Maverick Media	August 2020	Creative and marketing	
Heavy Iron Studios	September 2020	Development	
G-Net Media	November 2020	Marketing	
High Voltage Software	December 2020	Development	
Indigo Pearl	December 2020	Public relations	
Jinglebell	December 2020	Audio recording	
Tantalus Media	March 2021	Development	
Climax Studios	April 2021	Development	
AMC	August 2021	Art studio	
Waste Creative	December 2021	Creative production services	
Wicked Witch	December 2021	Development	
Forgotten Empires	June 2022	Development	
Mighty Games	August 2022	Development	
Smoking Gun Interactive	September 2022	Development	
Helpshift	December 2022	Customer support	
LabCom	December 2022	Public relations	
Fortyseven Communications	January 2023	Public relations	
Digital Media Management	March 2023	Marketing	
Hardsuit Labs	May 2023	Development	
The Multiplayer Group	December 2023	Development	
Wushu Studios	August 2024	Development	
Certain Affinity	October 2024	Development	

== Accolades ==
At the 2019 Technology Ireland Awards, Keywords Studios received the "company of the year" and "outstanding achievement in international growth" awards.
