= GameSim =

American video game developer

GameSim Inc
- Type: Subsidiary
- Industry: Video games
- Founded: 2008; 18 years ago
- Founder: Andrew Tosh
- Headquarters: Orlando, Florida, US
- Key people: Jessa Carlson (studio head)
- Parent: Keywords Studios (2017–present)
- Website: gamesim.com

GameSim Inc is an American video game developer founded in 2008 by Andrew Tosh. GameSim has a history of developing on different platforms, but has primarily focused on Xbox 360, Xbox One, Sony PS3, Sony PS4, PC platforms.

In 2013, GameSim was named the 466th fastest growing company in the United States by Inc. Additionally, GameSim was named the 890th fastest growing company in the Inc 5000 list in 2014. The company also received an award from GrowFL's Florida Companies to Watch list. There were over 450 applicants to GrowFL, and GameSim was honored as one of fifty companies to watch in Florida in 2014.

GameSim has also received industry specific awards, including being listed on MT2's Top Simulation & Training Companies from 2013 to 2014.

GameSim entered into a 3-year incentive agreement with Orange County, Florida in 2014, with the goal of adding 40 new high tech industry jobs to the Orlando area.

GameSim was acquired by Keywords Studios on May 17, 2017 for $4.76 million.

== Simulation ==
In 2011, NASA awarded GameSim a SBIR to develop a "Virtual Team Training Engine and Evaluation Framework".

In 2013, United States Air Force awarded GameSim a SBIR to develop a "Tactical Training Rehearsal Environment (TTRE)".

In the summer of 2013, CSX released train simulator CSX Moves in which GameSim provided all game design, art, and engineering work.

U.S. Army Research Laboratory Awarded GameSim with a procedural model generation service (PMGS) contract in April 2014. PMGS allows the static model creation process to be streamlined. New content is able to be generated by allowing users to skip the step of recreating an entire model library.

== GIS ==
In January 2013, GameSim released Conform a software product for viewing, editing and analyzing Geographic Information System (GIS) data. This can be paired with GameSim's PMGS product.

== Gaming ==
GameSim has performed work as a co-developer for many years with EA. This includes developer work with EA partners, such as EA Sports and BioWare. Below is a list of games GameSim has performed development work on.

=== Credited Developer ===
Title	Publisher	Platform	NA Release Date
Madden NFL	Electronic Arts	PS3, PS4, Xbox 360, Xbox One, iOS, Android	2010-2018
Dragon Age: Inquisition	BioWare	PS3, PS4, Xbox 360, Xbox One, Windows	2014
Leo's Fortune	Tilting Point	Amazon/Android	2014
Mass Effect 3	BioWare	PS3, Xbox 360, PC	2012
NCAA Football series	Electronic Arts	PS3, Xbox 360	2009-2013
NFL Showdown	Zynga	iOS, Android, Windows, Windows Phone	2014
Tiger Woods	Zynga	iOS, Android	2015
Mass Effect: Legendary Edition	Electronic Arts	PS4, Xbox One, Windows	2021
Dead Space	Electronic Arts	PS5, Xbox Series X/S, Windows	2023
Metroid Prime Remastered	Nintendo	Nintendo Switch	2023
Starfield	Bethesda Softworks	Xbox Series X/S, Windows	2023
Forza Motorsport	Xbox Game Studios	Xbox Series X/S, Windows	2023
Killing Floor 3	Tripwire Interactive	PS5, Xbox Series X/S, Windows	2025
Metroid Prime 4: Beyond	Nintendo	Nintendo Switch, Nintendo Switch 2	2025

In addition to game development, GameSim has performed work for EA's online game client, Origin. This work involves regular maintenance on the PC client. GameSim successfully ported all of the Windows specific logic to work with both Mac and PC, creating a single, shared code base for both platforms. This includes designing and implementing the in-game overlay of the Origin Mac client.
