= Top Gear Rally (2003 video game) =

2003 video game

- North American box art
- Developer: Tantalus Interactive
- Publishers: JP: Kemco; WW: Nintendo
- Series: Top Gear
- Platform: Game Boy Advance
- Release: JP: July 25, 2003; NA: October 27, 2003; EU: October 31, 2003; AU: November 14, 2003
- Genre: Racing
- Modes: Single-player, multiplayer

Top Gear Rally, known in Japan as Top Gear Rally SP, is a 2003 racing video game developed by Tantalus Interactive and published by Kemco for the Game Boy Advance. It was released by Nintendo outside Japan.

== Gameplay ==
Top Gear Rally is a racing game where the player drives rally cars through a series of courses. It also features a multiplayer mode where two players can compete against each other with the use of the Game Boy Advance Game Link Cable.

== Development ==
Top Gear Rally was developed by the Australian company Tantalus Interactive. Its cars were designed as full 3D models. The game was presented at the Electronic Entertainment Expo in May 2003.

== Reception ==
Reception

Aggregate scores
| Aggregator | Score |
|---|---|
| GameRankings | 77% |
| Metacritic | 78/100 |

Review scores
| Publication | Score |
|---|---|
| Eurogamer | 5/10 |
| Famitsu | 30/40 |
| Game Informer | 8/10 |
| GameSpot | 8.3/10 |
| GameSpy | 4/5 |
| IGN | 8/10 |
| Nintendo Power | 3.7/5 |

Top Gear Rally received generally favorable reviews from publications. GameSpot praised its graphics very positively, comparing their quality to that of PlayStation games.

Tantalus won Best Game at the 2003 Australian Game Developer Awards in Melbourne for its work on the game.
