= Funky Barn =

2012 video game

- North American Wii U cover
- Developer: Tantalus Media
- Publishers: Ubisoft (3DS); 505 Games (Wii U)
- Platforms: Nintendo 3DS; Wii U
- Release: Nintendo 3DS: NA: April 3, 2012; JP: May 24, 2012; AU: September 20, 2012; EU: September 21, 2012; Wii U: EU: November 30, 2012; AU: November 30, 2012; NA: November 18, 2012
- Genre: Simulation

Funky Barn, known as Funky Barn 3D on the Nintendo 3DS, is a farm simulation video game developed by Tantalus Media and published by Ubisoft and 505 Games for the Nintendo 3DS and Wii U consoles respectively.

== Gameplay ==
Gameplay is similar to that of the Story of Seasons series or Shepherd's Crossing.

The player can choose between two game modes: the main game or challenge farms. In the main game, players start their own farm and acquire new items and animals over time. In challenge mode, they restore an abandoned farm that is in extreme disrepair.

== Reception ==
Funky Barn received mixed reviews upon release; the Wii U version currently holds a rating of 50/100 on Metacritic and a 50.83% on GameRankings, based on 10 and 12 reviews, respectively. The 3DS version received similar reception, holding a 55% on Game Rankings based on 2 reviews.
