= Mary-Kate and Ashley: Winners Circle =

2001 video game

- European PlayStation cover art
- Developers: M4 Ltd (Game Boy Color); Tantalus Media(PlayStation)
- Publisher: Acclaim Entertainment (Note: Released under the Club Acclaim brand)
- Platforms: Game Boy Color, PlayStation
- Release: Game Boy Color: 27 February 2001; PlayStation: 1 March 2001
- Genre: Simulation (Show jumping)
- Mode: Single-player

Mary-Kate and Ashley: Winners Circle is a 2001 video game developed for the Game Boy Color by M4 Ltd. and by Tantalus Media for the PlayStation, and published by Acclaim Entertainment.

== Gameplay ==
A screenshot of the PlayStation version of Mary-Kate and Ashley: Winners Circle.

Winners Circle is a horse riding game in which the player selects and raises a horse to raise in a series of equestrian challenges. In the Game Boy Color version of the game, players select from a choice of four horses, and complete a collection of courses with obstacles under a time limit to earn ribbons and trophies in order to unlock more horses to ride and courses to complete. The PlayStation version is slightly more complex, with an 'Adventure' mode where players can freely ride their horse, train, feed and groom them, and unlock outfits through earning ribbons in races and competitions.

== Reception ==
Reception

Review scores
Publication	Score	
Publication	GBC	PS
AllGame	2.5/5	3/5
PlayStation Official Magazine – UK		6/10
Official U.S. PlayStation Magazine		2.5/5

Winners Circle received mixed reviews. Official UK PlayStation Magazine stated that the game was "actually entertaining, though ultimately limited and repetitive". Chris Baker of Official US PlayStation Magazine stated the game "might have some tweenagers hot to trot", but found the game had "frustrating controls".
