= StarCraft (upcoming video game) =

- Developer: Blizzard Entertainment
- Publisher: Blizzard Entertainment
- Designer: Dan Hay
- Series: StarCraft
- Platforms: Microsoft Windows; Xbox
- Release: Q2 2030
- Genre: Action-adventure

StarCraft is an upcoming third person shooter open world game developed and published by Blizzard Entertainment. Announced at BlizzCon 2026 on September 12, 2026, it is set to be released in the second quarter of 2030, and is a sequel to StarCraft II (2010).

It will be released for both PC and Xbox platforms.

== Gameplay ==
StarCraft is a narrative driven third person open world shooter.

It is intended that the game capture the asymmetrical feel between the three species from the RTS games. Terrans, zerg, and protoss will feature in the game, and both the zerg and protoss will feature as enemies. It is intended that the gameplay will have a 'tank like' feel (a terran wearing armor fighting through hordes of zerg for instance).

== Plot ==
StarCraft is set roughly 70 years after the events of Legacy of the Void, placing it in the 2570s. The story will have a definitive ending. In the timeframe of the game, the balance of power in the Koprulu sector has shifted, and it has been indicated that one of the three sapient species of said sector has stagnated during that time. Comments have indicated that the game's conflict is related to a war over resources. Countless political moves are taking place between hostile forces, and factions are constantly clashing, with the sense that the sector could tilt into catastrophe at any moment.

== Development ==
The game is being developed internally within Blizzard without any outside partners. The development team includes ex-Team 1 alumni, including those who worked on the original StarCraft.

=== Pre-reveal ===
Development of StarCraft began after the cancellation of Odyssey and Microsoft's acquisition of Activision Blizzard. While most of the Odyssey team was laid off, a small handful remained and began "incubating" a StarCraft FPS under the leadership of Dan Hay. The project had existed in some form before Hay took over. One of the first things discussed was how the game could capture the asymetry of the RTS games, and what story would be told. The developers sought to expand the setting.

In April 2022, it was confirmed that Blizzard was working on an untitled FPS game, with development going back until at least 2019. According to Nick Shpeshal of Xboxera, this game was a continuation of Ares.

In March 2024, two months after the announced cancellation of Odyssey, a number of positions were listed on Blizzard's jobs page for an upcoming game. While not confirmed to be Hay's project, the timing does fit the timeline laid out by Schreier. The positions stated that the project would involve the following:

- Multiplayer, mission-based gameplay
- Boss battles and "monster" enemies
- Multi-season story arcs, with an emphasis on characters, themes, and setting

The existence of the game was revealed by games journalist Jason Schreier in September 2024, concerning his then-upcoming book, Play Nice: The Rise, Fall, and Future of Blizzard Entertainment. Schreier noted that as of his writing of the book (which was set to be published the following month), the game was still in very early development, and doubted that it would be released, given Blizzard's prior attempts at creating StarCraft shooter games (i.e. StarCraft: Ghost and Ares), and that it was common for Blizzard to develop spin-off games in their IPs and never release them.

In November 2024, job postings on Blizzard's website indicated that Blizzard was working on an open-world FPS. Some have postulated this is the same project as the StarCraft FPS. In the same month, an ESRB rating was leaked for a game simply named "StarCraft." The listing gave the game a Teen rating for "animated blood and gore" and "strong language." The game's platform was listed simply as being "online."

In 2025, the game was in a state of development where the developers felt it could be revealed.

In January 2026, it was reported that a StarCraft third-person shooter would be revealed at BlizzCon 2026. It was suggested that this was Hay's project, though previous sources had stated it was a first-person shooter.

In February 2026, some outlets reported that a StarCraft game in development by Nexon was the same (or at least related to) Blizzard's own StarCraft shooter game. However, Jason Schreier reiterated that the Blizzard and Nexon projects were two separate games.

In April 2026, a job listing indicated that the game (described as a "AAA open-world shooter") would utilize the Unreal Engine. In the same month, Jez Corden repeated his prior comparison to Space Marine 2, and stated its art style was akin to that used in the cinematics of StarCraft II. Corden stressed that the style was specifically based on the game's cinematics, not its in-engine rendering, and that the game was aiming towards realism. Furthermore, the footage he saw was just a prototype. Corden further reported that press members had received invites to BlizzCon 2026, and that the invitation had come with a StarCraft logo (in addition to Blizzard's other major IPs), indicating a reveal of the game at the event.

In August 2026, Jason Schreier stated in an interview that he would not count on the game being a "Destiny-like." Later in the month, a supposed leak indicated the existence of a "StarCraft Infantry" game, set to be revealed at BlizzCon 2026. However, there was no registered trademark for such a product found prior to or after said supposed leak.

In September 2026, Corden stated that he "had it on good authority" that the title was "a single-player story kind of game," and reiterated the previous comparisons he had made to Space Marine 2. He further claimed that it would feature cutscenes and voice acting.

Prior to the reveal of the game, an ARG (alternate reality game) was carried out, teasing said game. Rather than simply showing information, we writers wanted to create an experience akin to an old-school radio drama, where something arrives when the listener least expects it. Glitches occurred on the website of StarCraft: Remastered. The developers envisioned the feeling of someone suddenly knocking on one's door without any explanation.

==== Art Style ====
One of the first things the developers did was to place the game's wearable armor on a turntable and spin it around. The armor itself presented an issue with doors, given its size. Ergo, the size of frames had to be adjusted in order to fit powered armor.

==== Story ====
Identity is extremely important. StarCraft has a very unique identity, and it's a franchise that holds deep personal meaning for me. I love the gritty, rough edge unique to StarCraft, as well as its space Western sensibility. It has that vibe of being on the frontier—remote, distant, and isolated. The characters aren't people who always just do what they're supposed to do, either. In fact, they often do things they shouldn't. There are countless political moves taking place between hostile forces, with factions constantly clashing. There's an underlying tension that the whole world could tilt into catastrophe at any moment. That's why I feel it's vital for StarCraft to maintain that dark and gritty atmosphere.

— Dan Hay

The original StarCraft is the basis for StarCraft 2030 in terms of atmosphere and "grit." According to Hay, the writers wanted to adapt the feel of the original game into the TPS project, including characters, music, and lore.

The decision to set the game seventy years after StarCraft II was to free the developers narratively; to build new stories, establish new characters, and show how factions have shifted since the End War. It is intended that the game preserve the IP's "signature dark, gritty mood and space western atmosphere." One of the reasons the seventy year mark was chosen was that if a character from a prior entry were to be brought back, it wouldn't be impossible for them to do so, but it wouldn't be so close to the events of prior games that their absence would feel noticeable.

One of the ideas of the game's story is the question of what it is like to not be expendable (in terms of military service)? The decision to have the story center on a single marine was an early one.

=== Post-reveal ===
This is something new. An open world shooter where every step is earned, not from above, down on the ground, in the mud, in the fire, honoring the past, its tone, its truth, but with an opportunity to push beyond it. We are here standing shoulder to shoulder with you. We are here to reignite this universe alongside each and every one of you. We are here to make StarCraft! And let’s be honest. It's about damn time.

— Dan Hay at the game's reveal

The game was formally unveiled at BlizzCon 2026. In an interview after the reveal, Hay stated that the game "would honour StarCraft’s past, but [was] an opportunity to push beyond it." The 2030 release date was chosen to ensure the game's development remained focused and avoid concept creep.
