= Forgotten Empires =

American video game developer

- Type: Subsidiary
- Industry: Video games
- Founded: 2013
- Founder: Ryan Shepherd; Bert Beeckman
- Headquarters: Cincinnati, Ohio, US
- Key people: Ryan Shepherd (studio head); Bert Beeckman (lead developer)
- Products: Age of Empires series
- Number of employees: 100+ (2025)
- Parent: Keywords Studios (2022–present)
- Website: www.forgottenempires.net

Forgotten Empires is an American video game developer based in Cincinnati, Ohio. It was founded by Bert Beeckman and Ryan Shepherd in 2013. It specializes in creating real-time strategy (RTS) games, particularly within the historical genre. Their contributions include the development of expansions and remastering of Age of Empires titles. In June 2022, Forgotten Empires was acquired by Keywords Studios.

== History ==
Forgotten Empires originated as a group of gamers who began working on a modification for Age of Empires II in 2012. Around the same time, Microsoft was in the process of creating a remastered HD edition of Age of Empires II. The mod was successful, prompting Microsoft to collaborate with the group to transform their project into an official expansion. This collaboration was announced in June 2013, with Microsoft revealing Forgotten Empires' involvement in the ongoing development of Age of Empires II: HD Edition. Subsequently, in collaboration with SkyBox Labs, the expansion titled Age of Empires II HD: The Forgotten was released a few months later.

After this success, Forgotten Empires and Microsoft Studios co-developed The African Kingdoms and Rise of the Rajas, two further Age of Empires II HD expansion packs. They also contributed to Tale of the Dragon, an expansion for Age of Mythology, a spin-off game centered on mythology.

Age of Empires: Definitive Edition was revealed by Forgotten Empires in 2017 during the Electronic Entertainment Expo PC Gaming Show. The game's release date was pushed back from October 19, 2017, to February 20, 2018. Through the Windows Store, Age of Empires: Definitive Edition was made accessible. Forgotten Empires had co-developed multiple video games and expansions for the Age of Empires franchise with World's Edge, SkyBox Labs, and Relic Entertainment.

In June 2022, Keywords Studios acquired Forgotten Empires for $32.5 million. In 2023, World's Edge announced that a remastered version of Age of Mythology, Age of Mythology: Retold, is in development, with Forgotten Empires also co-developing it.

== Games and expansions ==
Year	Title
2013	Age of Empires II HD: The Forgotten
2014	Age of Mythology: Extended Edition
2015	Age of Empires II HD: The African Kingdoms
2016	Age of Mythology: Tale of the Dragon
2016	Age of Empires II HD: Rise of the Rajas
2018	Age of Empires: Definitive Edition
2019	Age of Empires II: Definitive Edition
2020	Age of Empires III: Definitive Edition
2021	Age of Empires II: Definitive Edition - Lords of the West
2021	Age of Empires III: Definitive Edition - United States Civilization
2021	Age of Empires III: Definitive Edition - The African Royals
2021	Age of Empires II: Definitive Edition - Dawn of the Dukes
2021	Age of Empires III: Definitive Edition - Mexico Civilization
2021	Age of Empires IV
2022	Age of Empires II: Definitive Edition - Dynasties of India
2022	Age of Empires III: Definitive Edition - Knights of the Mediterranean
2023	Age of Empires II: Definitive Edition - Return of Rome
2023	Age of Empires II: Definitive Edition - The Mountain Royals
2023	Age of Empires IV: The Sultans Ascend
2024	Age of Empires II: Definitive Edition - Victors and Vanquished
2024	Age of Mythology: Retold
2024	Age of Empires II: Definitive Edition - Chronicles: Battle for Greece
2025	Age of Mythology: Retold - Immortal Pillars
2025	Age of Mythology: Retold - Heavenly Spear
2025	Age of Empires IV - Knights of Cross and Rose
2025	Age of Empires II: Definitive Edition - The Three Kingdoms
2025	Age of Empires IV - Dynasties of the East
2025	Age of Empires II: Definitive Edition - Chronicles: Alexander the Great
2026	Age of Empires II: Definitive Edition - The Last Chieftains
2026	Age of Mythology: Retold - Obsidian Mirror
2026	Age of Empires IV - Yue Fei’s Legacy
2026	Age of Empires IV - Raiders of the North
2026	Age of Empires III: Definitive Edition - The Baltic Powers
