= Tantalus Media =

Australian video game developer

Tantalus Media Pty Ltd
- Type: Subsidiary
- Industry: Video games
- Founded: 1994; 32 years ago
- Founders: Andrew Bailey; Trevor Nuridin
- Headquarters: Fitzroy, Melbourne, Australia
- Number of locations: 3 (2022)
- Key people: Tom Crago (CEO)
- Parent: Perfect Entertainment (1995–1998); Keywords Studios (85%; 2021–present)
- Divisions: Tantalus North; Tantalus South
- Website: www.tantalus.com.au

Tantalus Media (formerly Tantalus Entertainment and Tantalus Interactive) is an Australian video game developer based in Melbourne. Since its inception, Tantalus has developed almost 100 games and has won multiple game awards. Keywords Studios acquired 85% of Tantalus Media in March 2021.

== History ==
Tantalus Entertainment was founded in 1994 by programmers Andrew Bailey and Trevor Nuridin, who previously worked at Beam Software. Perfect Entertainment acquired the company in 1995 and tasked it with porting Stargate to the Super Nintendo Entertainment System (SNES) and Wipeout to the Sega Saturn. The directors bought the company back in 1999 and renamed it Tantalus Interactive. The studio's first original game was South Park Rally, released for the PlayStation, Microsoft Windows, Nintendo 64, and Sega Dreamcast by Acclaim Entertainment in 2000.

By 2001, the company faced bankruptcy until Tom Crago joined as CEO. Tantalus developed a game engine that enabled 3D graphics on the Game Boy Advance, releasing conversions of ATV Quad Power Racing in 2002 and Monster Truck Madness in 2003. Top Gear Rally was released in 2003 and won 'Best Game' at the 2003 Australian Game Developer Conference (AGDC) Awards in Melbourne. Between 2003 and 2009, the company released several games under its Black Market Games banner. Tantalus ported Unreal II to the Xbox in 2004 and Bailey won a 2004 AGDC award for his contributions to the CRIS GBA game engine. That year, the company established Tantalus Asia, a joint venture based in Kuala Lumpur, Malaysia, to develop games for mobile devices.

Tantalus began developing Anaka as a jump 'n' run title for the Game Boy Advance in 2003. However, unable to find interest from a publisher, Tantalus and Act3animation made an AU$300,000 animated short film to attract investors. It ultimately aired on Nickelodeon in 2005. In 2006, a touch-only Nintendo DS demo was created. Players could control the character indirectly by touching the screen where they wanted them to go. It was a mix between a jump 'n' run and a traditional adventure game.

Tantalus then began developing for the Nintendo DS, releasing Pony Friends in 2007. The game sold one million units in a year, making it the highest-selling single-format game developed in Australia. The studio was the only independent developer that year to have three games among the 100 top-selling titles worldwide. Crago bought out the company's shareholders, renamed it Tantalus Media, and immediately sold a stake to private equity company Netus. A second studio was opened in Brisbane in 2008.

However, the 2007-2009 financial crisis heavily impacted Tantalus and the broader Australian video games industry. In 2009, Tantalus closed its Brisbane office and reduced staff at its Melbourne headquarters. In 2010, CEO Tom Crago reacquired the studio from Netus.

That same year, the company launched Straight Right, a new label targeting the core gaming market. Straight Right released Need for Speed: Shift 2 - Unleashed for iOS in 2011, followed by Wii U ports of Mass Effect 3 in 2012 and Deus Ex: Human Revolution in 2013. Nintendo approached Tantalus to develop the HD remaster of The Legend of Zelda: Twilight Princess, which was released in 2016. The studio ported Cities: Skylines to Xbox One and PlayStation 4 in 2017 and to the Nintendo Switch in 2018. In 2018, Tantalus announced it would bring the grand strategy game Stellaris to Xbox and PlayStation.

In March 2021, Keywords Studios acquired 85% of Tantalus Media for US$46.8 million. The two companies formed Keywords Australia as a joint venture overseen by Crago. In 2022, the company established Tantalus South in Adelaide and Tantalus North in Brisbane alongside its Melbourne studio. In 2024, Tantalus partnered with Google to develop games for the Fitbit Ace LTE activity tracker and created new DLC for Cities: Skylines. At the end of that year, Crago stepped down as CEO of Tantalus and Keywords Australia.

== Games ==
| Title | Year | Platform | Ref. |
|---|---|---|---|
| Stargate | 1995 | SNES | |
| Area 51 | 1995 | PC, PlayStation, Saturn | |
| Wipeout | 1996 | Saturn | |
| Krazy Ivan | 1996 | PC | |
| Manx TT Super Bike | 1997 | PC, Saturn | |
| Maximum Force | 1997 | PC, PlayStation, Saturn | |
| Wipeout 2097 | 1997 | Saturn | |
| The House of the Dead | 1998 | Saturn | |
| Mary King's Riding Star | 1999 | PlayStation | |
| South Park Rally | 1999 | Dreamcast, N64, PC, PlayStation | |
| Equestriad 2001 | 2001 | PC, PlayStation | |
| Mary-Kate and Ashley: Winners Circle | 2001 | PlayStation | |
| ATV: Quad Power Racing | 2002 | Game Boy Advance | |
| Men in Black II: Alien Escape | 2002 | GameCube | |
| Woody Woodpecker in Crazy Castle 5 | 2002 | Game Boy Advance | |
| Monster Truck Madness | 2003 | Game Boy Advance | |
| Unreal II: The Awakening | 2003 | Xbox | |
| Top Gear Rally | 2003 | Game Boy Advance | |
| AMF Bowling 2004 (as Black Market Games) | 2003 | Xbox | |
| The Polar Express | 2004 | Game Boy Advance | |
| The Adventures of Jimmy Neutron Boy Genius: Attack of the Twonkies | 2004 | Game Boy Advance | |
| Black Market Bowling (as Black Market Games) | 2005 | PlayStation 2 | |
| Payload | 2005 | N-Gage | |
| SpongeBob SquarePants: The Yellow Avenger | 2005, 2006 | DS, PSP | |
| Trick Star | 2006 | Game Boy Advance | |
| MX vs. ATV: On the Edge | 2006 | PSP | |
| Cars Mater-National Championship | 2007 | DS, Game Boy Advance | |
| MX vs. ATV: Untamed | 2007 | DS, PSP | |
| Pony Friends | 2007 | DS | |
| The Legend of Spyro: Dawn of the Dragon | 2008 | DS | |
| Heat Shield (as Black Market Games) | 2009 | iOS | |
| Pony Friends 2 | 2009 | DS, PC, Wii | |
| MX vs. ATV Reflex | 2009 | DS, PSP | |
| Cars Race-O-Rama | 2009 | DS, PSP | |
| Drift Street International | 2010 | DS | |
| Legend of the Guardians: The Owls of Ga'Hoole | 2010 | DS | |
| Megamind | 2010 | DS, PSP | |
| Super Speed Machines | 2010 | DS | |
| Ben 10: Galactic Racing | 2011 | DS | |
| Shift 2: Unleashed | 2011 | iOS | |
| Funky Barn | 2012 | 3DS, Wii U | |
| Pony Trails | 2012 | iOS | |
| Mass Effect 3: Special Edition | 2012 | Wii U | |
| Deus Ex: Human Revolution Director's Cut | 2013 | Wii U | |
| Zombi | 2015 | PC, PS4, Xbox One | |
| Pony Trails | 2015 | Android | |
| The Legend of Zelda: Twilight Princess HD | 2016 | Wii U | |
| Sonic Mania | 2017 | Switch | |
| Rime | 2017 | Switch | |
| Cities: Skylines | 2017, 2018, 2022 | PC, PS4, Xbox One, Switch, Stadia | |
| Age of Empires: Definitive Edition | 2018 | PC | |
| Stellaris: Console Edition | 2019 | PS4, Xbox One | |
| Jupiter & Mars | 2019 | PS4 | |
| Age of Empires II: Definitive Edition | 2019 | PC | |
| Age of Empires III: Definitive Edition | 2020 | PC | |
| The Legend of Zelda: Skyward Sword HD | 2021 | Switch | |
| Cities: Skylines - Remastered | 2023 | PlayStation 5, Xbox Series X/S | |
| Lego 2K Drive | 2023 | PC, PS4, Switch, Xbox One | |
| Age of Mythology: Retold | 2024 | PC, Xbox Series, Xbox One | |
| Luigi's Mansion 2 HD | 2024 | Switch | |
| Guilty Gear Strive | 2025 | Switch | |
