= List of Xbox studios =

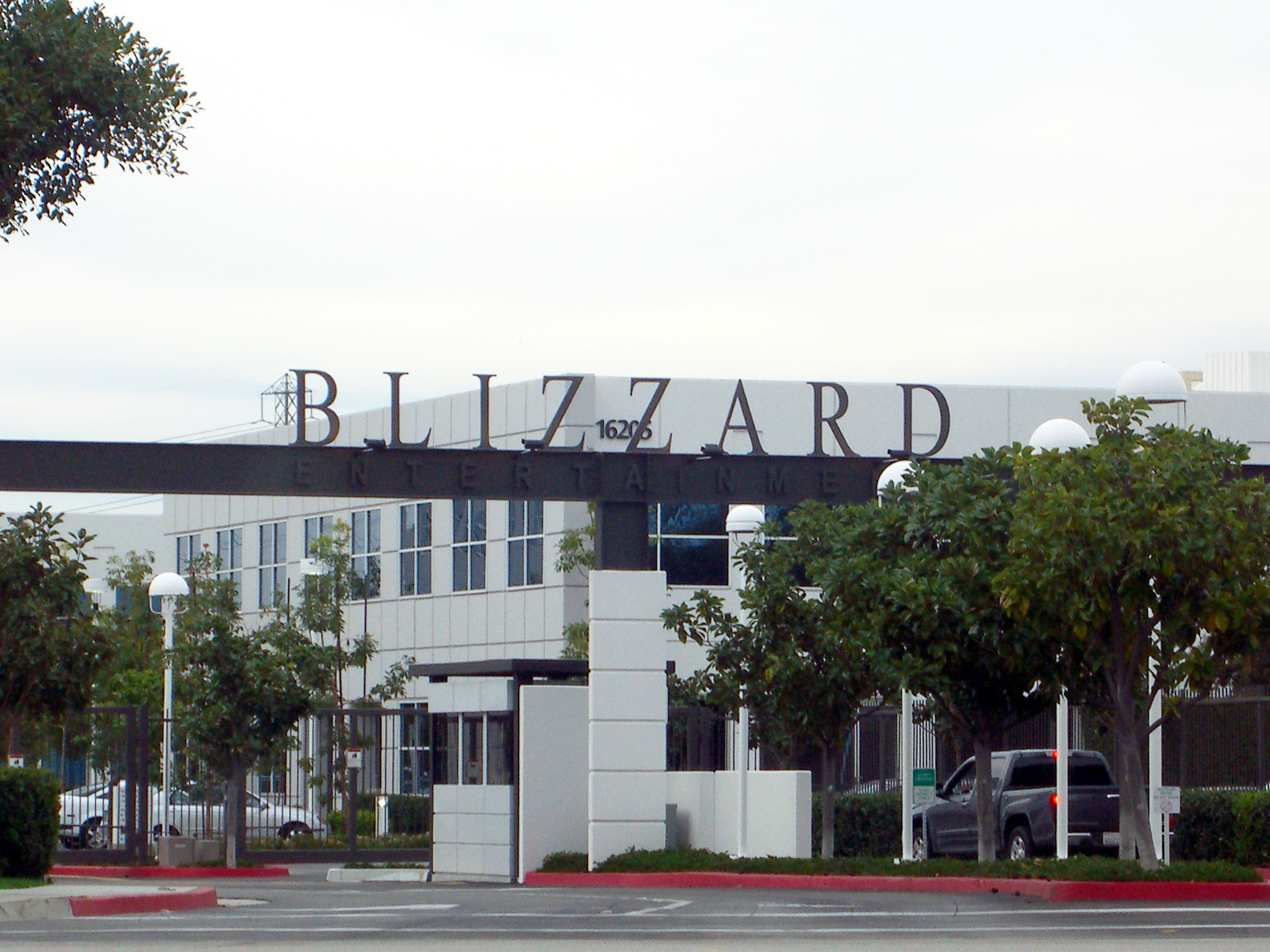
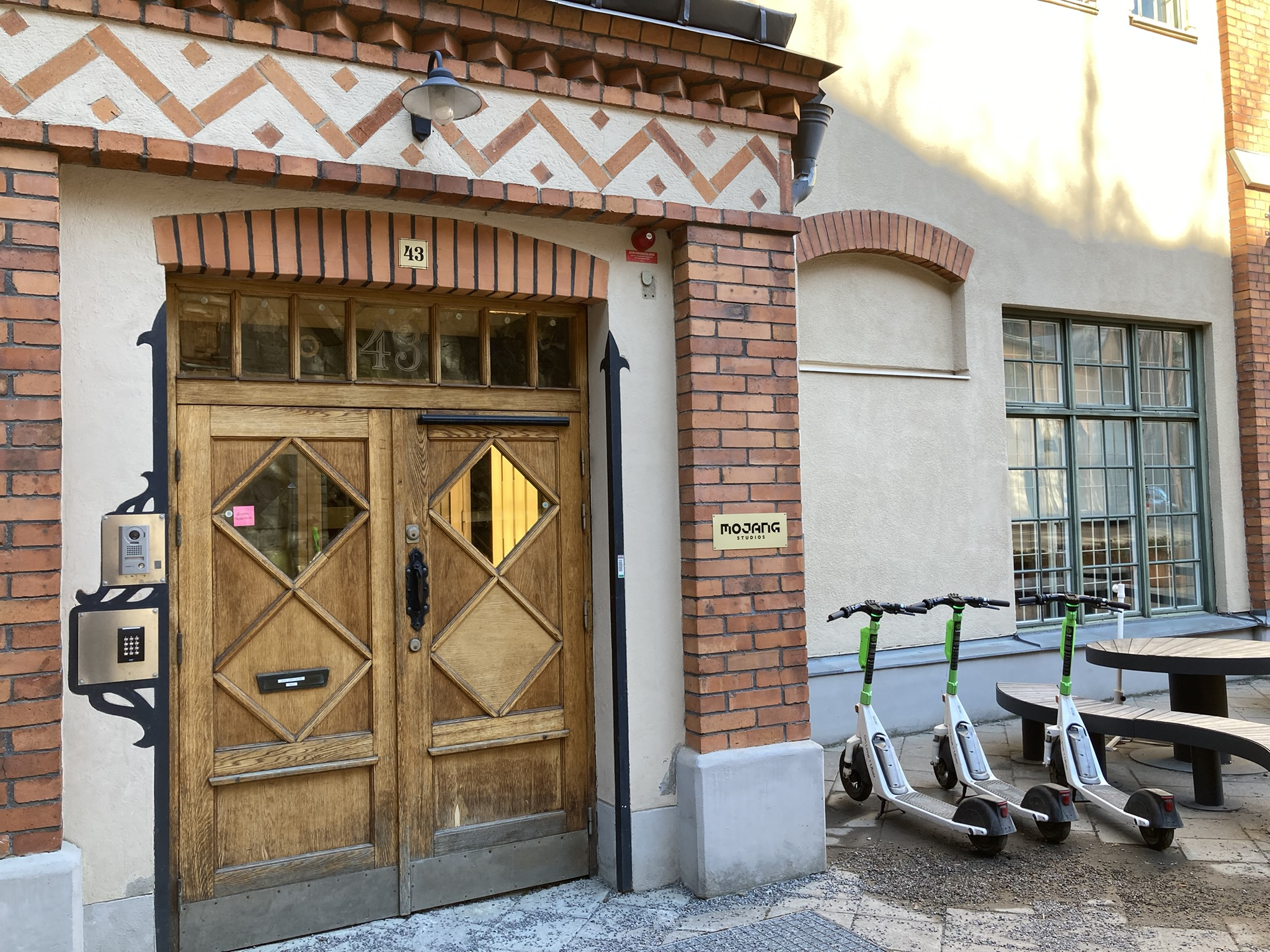
Blizzard Irvine and Mojang Stockholm are examples of Xbox studios.

This is a list of Xbox video game studios, including development studios, support studios, and satellite studios. Xbox is an American video game company headquartered in Redmond, Washington, US, founded on January 18, 2022.

After several acquisitions, Xbox has become one of the largest video game companies, and it has one of the largest in-house development teams, with thousands of employees working in 28 studios as of September 2026.

As of September 2026, Xbox consists of the following subsidiaries: Xbox Game Studios, ZeniMax Media, Activision Blizzard, Mojang Studios, and King. It owns six video game publishing labels, including Xbox Game Studios, Bethesda Softworks, Activision, Blizzard Entertainment, Mojang Studios, and King.

== Studios ==
| Name | Location(s) | Founded | Notable release(s) | Ref. |
Directly owned
| King | Stockholm, Sweden | 2003 | Candy Crush Saga series, Farm Heroes Saga series, and Microsoft Casual Games | |
| King | Malmö, Sweden | 2003 | Candy Crush Saga series, Farm Heroes Saga series, and Microsoft Casual Games | |
| King | London, England | 2003 | Candy Crush Saga series, Farm Heroes Saga series, and Microsoft Casual Games | |
| King | New York City, New York | 2003 | Candy Crush Saga series, Farm Heroes Saga series, and Microsoft Casual Games | |
| King | San Francisco, California | 2003 | Candy Crush Saga series, Farm Heroes Saga series, and Microsoft Casual Games | |
| King | Los Angeles, California | 2003 | Candy Crush Saga series, Farm Heroes Saga series, and Microsoft Casual Games | |
| King | Redmond, Washington | 2003 | Candy Crush Saga series, Farm Heroes Saga series, and Microsoft Casual Games | |
| King | Dublin, Ireland | 2003 | Candy Crush Saga series, Farm Heroes Saga series, and Microsoft Casual Games | |
| King | St. Paul's Bay, Malta | 2003 | Candy Crush Saga series, Farm Heroes Saga series, and Microsoft Casual Games | |
| King | Barcelona, Spain | 2003 | Candy Crush Saga series, Farm Heroes Saga series, and Microsoft Casual Games | |
| King | Berlin, Germany | 2003 | Candy Crush Saga series, Farm Heroes Saga series, and Microsoft Casual Games | |
| Mojang Studios | Stockholm, Sweden | 2009 | Minecraft series | |
| Mojang Studios | Redmond, Washington | 2009 | Minecraft series | |
| Mojang Studios | Shanghai, China | 2009 | Minecraft series | |
| Mojang Studios | Tokyo, Japan | 2009 | Minecraft series | |
| Mojang Studios | London, England | 2009 | Minecraft series | |
Xbox Game Studios
| The Coalition | Vancouver, British Columbia | 2010 | Gears of War series (2014–present) | |
| Halo Studios | Redmond, Washington | 2007 | Halo series (2010–2026) | |
| inXile Entertainment | Tustin, California | 2002 | Wasteland series, Clockwork Revolution | |
| inXile Entertainment | New Orleans, Louisiana | 2002 | Wasteland series, Clockwork Revolution | |
| Playground Games | Leamington Spa, England | 2010 | Forza series, Fable series (2020–present) | |
| Playground Games | Redmond, Washington | 2001 | Forza series, Fable series (2020–present) | |
ZeniMax Media
| Bethesda Game Studios | Rockville, Maryland | 2001 | Fallout series, The Elder Scrolls series, Starfield | |
| Bethesda Game Studios | Austin, Texas | 2001 | Fallout series, The Elder Scrolls series, Starfield | |
| Bethesda Game Studios | Dallas, Texas | 2001 | Fallout series, The Elder Scrolls series, Starfield | |
| Bethesda Game Studios | Montreal, Quebec | 2001 | Fallout series, The Elder Scrolls series, Starfield | |
| id Software | Richardson, Texas | 1991 | Wolfenstein series (1992–2008), Doom series, Quake series | |
| id Software | Frankfurt, Germany | 1991 | Wolfenstein series (1992–2008), Doom series, Quake series | |
| Obsidian Entertainment | Irvine, California | 2003 | Fallout: New Vegas, Pillars of Eternity series, The Outer Worlds series, Grounded series | |
| MachineGames | Uppsala, Sweden | 2009 | Wolfenstein series (2014–present), Indiana Jones and the Great Circle | |
| MachineGames | Sundsvall, Sweden | 2009 | Wolfenstein series (2014–present), Indiana Jones and the Great Circle | |
| ZeniMax Online Studios | Hunt Valley, Maryland | 2007 | The Elder Scrolls Online | |
| ZeniMax Online Studios | Budapest, Hungary | 2007 | The Elder Scrolls Online | |
Activision Blizzard
| Activision Shanghai Studio | Shanghai, China | 2009 | Call of Duty series support studio | |
| Beenox | Quebec City, Quebec | 2000 | Spider-Man: Shattered Dimensions, Crash Team Racing Nitro-Fueled, Call of Duty series support studio | |
| Beenox | Montreal, Quebec | 2000 | Spider-Man: Shattered Dimensions, Crash Team Racing Nitro-Fueled, Call of Duty series support studio | |
| Blizzard Entertainment | Irvine, California | 1991 | Warcraft series, Diablo series, StarCraft series, Overwatch series | |
| Blizzard Entertainment | Albany, New York | 1991 | Warcraft series, Diablo series, StarCraft series, Overwatch series | |
| Blizzard Entertainment | Austin, Texas | 1991 | Warcraft series, Diablo series, StarCraft series, Overwatch series | |
| Blizzard Entertainment | Boston, Massachusetts | 1991 | Warcraft series, Diablo series, StarCraft series, Overwatch series | |
| Blizzard Entertainment | Shanghai, China | 1991 | Warcraft series, Diablo series, StarCraft series, Overwatch series | |
| Blizzard Entertainment | Seoul, South Korea | 1991 | Warcraft series, Diablo series, StarCraft series, Overwatch series | |
| Blizzard Entertainment | Sydney, New South Wales | 1991 | Warcraft series, Diablo series, StarCraft series, Overwatch series | |
| Blizzard Entertainment | Taipei, Taiwan | 1991 | Warcraft series, Diablo series, StarCraft series, Overwatch series | |
| Blizzard Entertainment | Barcelona, Spain | 1991 | Warcraft series, Diablo series, StarCraft series, Overwatch series | |
| Demonware | Dublin, Ireland | 2003 | Call of Duty series support studio | |
| Demonware | Vancouver, British Columbia | 2003 | Call of Duty series support studio | |
| Demonware | Los Angeles, California | 2003 | Call of Duty series support studio | |
| Demonware | Shanghai, China | 2003 | Call of Duty series support studio | |
| Digital Legends Entertainment | Barcelona, Spain | 2001 | Call of Duty: Warzone Mobile, Call of Duty series support studio | |
| Elsewhere Entertainment | Warsaw, Poland | 2024 | — | |
| Elsewhere Entertainment | Malmö, Sweden | 2024 | — | |
| High Moon Studios | Carlsbad, California | 2001 | Darkwatch, Transformers: War for Cybertron, Transformers: Fall of Cybertron, Deadpool, Call of Duty series support studio | |
| Infinity Ward | Los Angeles, California | 2002 | Call of Duty: Modern Warfare sub-series | |
| Infinity Ward | Austin, Texas | 2002 | Call of Duty: Modern Warfare sub-series | |
| Infinity Ward | Kraków, Poland | 2002 | Call of Duty: Modern Warfare sub-series | |
| Infinity Ward | Mexico City, Mexico | 2002 | Call of Duty: Modern Warfare sub-series | |
| Infinity Ward | Barcelona, Spain | 2002 | Call of Duty: Modern Warfare sub-series | |
| Rare | Twycross, England | 1985 | Battletoads series, Killer Instinct series, Banjo-Kazooie series, Conker series, Perfect Dark series, Viva Piñata series, Sea of Thieves | |
| Raven Software | Middleton, Wisconsin | 1990 | Heretic/Hexen series, Soldier of Fortune series, Singularity, Call of Duty: Warzone, Call of Duty series support studio | |
| Sledgehammer Games | San Francisco, California | 2009 | Call of Duty: Advanced Warfare, Call of Duty: WWII, Call of Duty: Vanguard, Call of Duty: Modern Warfare III | |
| Sledgehammer Games | Toronto, Ontario | 2009 | Call of Duty: Advanced Warfare, Call of Duty: WWII, Call of Duty: Vanguard, Call of Duty: Modern Warfare III | |
| Sledgehammer Games | Guildford, England | 2009 | Call of Duty: Advanced Warfare, Call of Duty: WWII, Call of Duty: Vanguard, Call of Duty: Modern Warfare III | |
| Sledgehammer Games | Melbourne, Victoria | 2009 | Call of Duty: Advanced Warfare, Call of Duty: WWII, Call of Duty: Vanguard, Call of Duty: Modern Warfare III | |
| Solid State Studios | Santa Monica, California | 2021 | Support for Call of Duty: Mobile | |
| Treyarch | Los Angeles, California | 1996 | Call of Duty: Black Ops sub-series | |
| Treyarch | Vancouver, British Columbia | 1996 | Call of Duty: Black Ops sub-series | |
| Treyarch | Austin, Texas | 1996 | Call of Duty: Black Ops sub-series | |
| World's Edge | Redmond, Washington | 2019 | Age of Empires series (2019–present) | |

== Former studios ==
Xbox Game Studios

- The Initiative in Santa Monica, California – closed in July 2025.
- Compulsion Games in Westmount, Montreal – spun off from Xbox via management buyout in July 2026.
- Double Fine in San Francisco, California – spun off from Xbox via management buyout in July 2026.
- Ninja Theory in Cambridge, England – TBD.
- Undead Labs in Seattle, Washington – spun off from Xbox becoming an Independent studio in September 2026.
- Turn 10 Studios – merged into Playground Games in September 2026.
- Microsoft Casual Games – merged into King in September 2026.

ZeniMax Media

- Alpha Dog Games in Halifax, Nova Scotia – closed in May 2024 and revived as an independently owned company in 2026
- Arkane Austin in Austin, Texas – closed in May 2024.
- Roundhouse Studios in Madison, Wisconsin – merged with ZeniMax Online Studios in May 2024.
- Tango Gameworks in Shibaura, Tokyo – closed in June 2024 and sold to Krafton in August 2024.
- Arkane Studios in Lyon, France – TBD.

Activision

- Toys for Bob in Novato, California – spun off from Activision via management buyout in February 2024.

== See also ==
- List of mergers and acquisitions by Microsoft
- List of Xbox video games
