= Age of Empires II: Definitive Edition =

2019 real-time strategy video game

- Developers: World's Edge; Forgotten Empires (Note: Additional work by Tantalus Media and Wicked Witch)
- Publisher: Xbox Game Studios
- Series: Age of Empires
- Platforms: Windows; macOS; Xbox One; Xbox Series X/S; PlayStation 5
- Release: Windows; November 14, 2019; Xbox One, Series X/S; January 31, 2023; PlayStation 5; May 6, 2025; macOS; May 28, 2026
- Genre: Real-time strategy
- Modes: Single-player, multiplayer

Age of Empires II: Definitive Edition is a 2019 real-time strategy video game developed by World's Edge and Forgotten Empires and published by Xbox Game Studios. It is a remaster of the 1999 game Age of Empires II: The Age of Kings, celebrating the 20th anniversary of the original. It features significantly improved visuals, supports 4K resolution, and includes all previous expansions from the original and HD Edition. In addition, the game includes an expansion to the HD Edition called The Last Khans, which adds four new civilizations based on Central Asia and Eastern Europe, as well as four new campaigns. Age of Empires II: Definitive Edition was released for Windows on November 14, 2019, and was ported to Xbox One and Xbox Series X/S on January 31, 2023. A PlayStation 5 version was released on May 6, 2025.

== Gameplay ==
Gameplay of Age of Empires II: Definitive Edition

The core gameplay elements are shared heavily with the original. Players compete alone or in teams to build medieval economies and armies. The object of the game is win by various means (gathering all holy relics for a religious victory, for example, or constructing a "wonder"), or, more commonly, by forcing the other players to surrender through conquest.

The game is played in unaltered time, with set speeds for movement or construction. Units are created as individual villagers or soldiers and can be controlled in any combination. Villagers gather resources from pre-existing deposits (trees, "gold" and "stone" tiles, and huntable animals, for example) and construct or repair buildings. While the game surface is based on a series of tiles, these have no impact on the movement of units save to block them when impassable. The game is presented in an isometric format.

Every game in the Age of Empires series, except for Age of Empires III, has four 'Ages' which serve in a role similar to settlement levels in other games. The first, the 'Dark Age' is an economy-focused period in which players are highly limited in their army options. The second, the 'Feudal Age', is more open and vaguely represents the period a short time after the collapse of the Roman Empire when minor polities were starting to form. The third, the 'Castle Age', represents the warfare between developing kingdoms of the years between roughly 1066 and 1350, while the fourth, the 'Imperial Age' allows for the production of more sophisticated soldiers and siege weapons and represents the years between the 1300s and the 1500s. (Note: The game is known to extend as far as the Battle of Lepanto in 1571. Other dates are less certain.)

Single player modes exist, in which players can compete against AI opponents or play predesigned historically-based storylines known as campaigns. Non-campaign games are played on 2-dimensional, procedurally generated maps, with players allowed to select a size and style of map beforehand. Players with sufficient connection to the internet can play the more competitive ranked games with each other.

== Changes ==
The remaster includes 4K graphics, improved visuals for troops and buildings, the ability to zoom in and further out, and a new spectator mode. It features a new expansion called The Last Khans and includes four new civilizations: Bulgarians, Cumans, Lithuanians, and Tatars. Four new campaigns were added for the new civilizations: Ivaylo, Kotyan Khan, Pachacuti, and Tamerlane which is about the Inca civilization and replaces El Dorado from the HD Edition (Lithuanians do not appear as a playable civilization in any campaign; however, they represented Poles in the Ivaylo campaign before Poles released in Dawn of the Dukes). It includes all previous expansions from the original (The Conquerors) and HD Edition (The Forgotten, The African Kingdoms, and Rise of the Rajas).

Players can choose between opponents or teammates of the original AI, the updated HD Edition AI that was added alongside the HD Edition of the game, and a newer AI developed for the Definitive Edition. When the old and new AIs were pitted against each other in a test, the new one easily defeated the old one. Unit pathfinding is also supposedly improved upon. Numerous 'quality of life' modifications were made. Players can shift-queue villager tasks. Farms now have the option to be replenished automatically.

== Development ==
Age of Empires II: The Age of Kings was developed by Ensemble Studios and released in 1999. Ensemble Studios was acquired by Microsoft in 2001 and ultimately shuttered in 2009, just after their final project, Halo Wars, was finished. Hidden Path Entertainment developed a high-definition remaster of Age of Empires II, HD Edition, which released in 2013. Among other features, HD Edition added Steam Workshop integration for custom content. Concurrently, a group of modders had been developing additional content and bug fixes for the original game, called Forgotten Empires. Approaching Microsoft after the mod's release in late 2012, they learned that Microsoft was developing HD Edition and had expressed interest in turning their mod into an official release. Their efforts became the first expansion for HD Edition, "The Forgotten", developed in conjunction with Skybox Labs. The mod team, now Forgotten Empires LLC, continued to collaborate with Microsoft on new expansions for HD Edition.

== Release ==
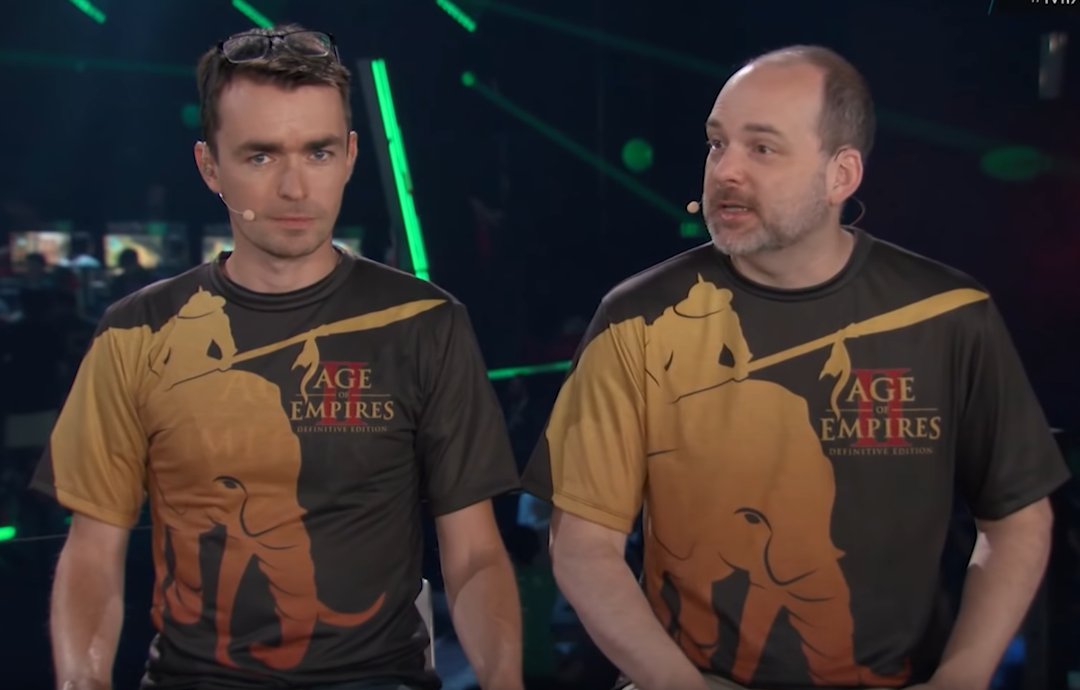
Bert Beeckman (co-founder of Forgotten Empires) and Adam Isgreen at E3 2019

On August 21, 2017, at Gamescom, Microsoft announced Age of Empires II: Definitive Edition was in development by Forgotten Empires, Tantalus Media, and Wicked Witch Software. On June 9, 2019, Microsoft revealed the gameplay trailer at Xbox E3 2019. It released on the Xbox Game Pass for PC in addition to Steam and the Windows Store on November 14, 2019. A port to the Xbox One and Xbox Series X/S was announced during the 25th anniversary livestream on October 25, 2022, and was released on January 31, 2023. The console version features both gamepad and mouse and keyboard controls, and optional cross-platform play with PC version.

On February 4, 2025, Microsoft and Forgotten Empires announced that Age of Empires II: Definitive Edition would release for PlayStation 5 in Spring 2025, being preceded by the launch of Age of Mythology: Retold on the console in March 2024. Definitive Edition's release on PS5 marks the first time an AoE game has released on a PlayStation console since the PlayStation 2 release of the original Age of Empires II in 2002. The PS5 version will be launched alongside a new expansion that features new civilizations for Ranked Play, and support for cross-platform play with the Xbox and PC versions.

On April 30, 2026, a release for macOS by Feral Interactive was announced and scheduled to launch on Steam on May 28, 2026, with a Mac App Store release planned for later that year. The port was revealed little more than a month following the release of the expansion The Last Chieftains, and would include most features available in the Windows version, with the notable exception of cross-platform play.

=== Expansions ===
Release timeline Age of Empires II: Definitive Edition release history
2019	Age of Empires II: Definitive Edition
2020
2021	Lords of the West
2021	Dawn of the Dukes
2022	Dynasties of India
2023	Return of Rome
2023	The Mountain Royals
2024	Victors and Vanquished
2024	Chronicles: Battle for Greece
2025	The Three Kingdoms
2025	Chronicles: Alexander the Great
2026	The Last Chieftains
2026	The Viking Sagas

An expansion pack, Lords of the West, was announced on December 15, 2020, and released on January 26, 2021. The Lords of the West expansion introduced two further civilizations, the Burgundians and the Sicilians, as well as three new campaigns, featuring Edward Longshanks, the Dukes of Burgundy, and the Hautevilles.

A second expansion, Dawn of the Dukes, was announced on April 10, 2021, and released on August 10. It introduced two Central European civilizations, the Poles and the Bohemians, with the Lithuanians being the subject of a campaign, as well as three new campaigns, featuring Jadwiga, Jan Žižka, and Algirdas and Kęstutis.

In June 2021, for the first time since Age of Empires Online, co-op campaigns were introduced into the game.

A third expansion, Dynasties of India, was announced on April 14, 2022, and was released on April 28. It features three new civilizations, the Bengalis, the Dravidians, and the Gurjaras. Additionally, the expansion also features reworks to the existing Indian civilization, which was renamed the Hindustanis. Three new campaigns, featuring Babur, Rajendra, and Devapala, were also introduced.

To celebrate the franchise's 25th anniversary a fourth expansion was announced, Return of Rome. It is composed of content from Age of Empires: Definitive Edition brought into the Age of Empires II: Definitive Edition engine, plus one new civilization (the Lạc Việt) and three new campaigns (featuring Sargon of Akkad, Pyrrhus of Epirus, and Trajan), and the Roman civilization for the main game. It was released on May 16, 2023. On September 8, 2023, two campaigns (Ascent of Egypt and The First Punic War) from Age of Empires: Definitive Edition were added to Return of Rome. Two other campaigns for Return of Rome, Glory of Greece and Voices of Babylon, were added on October 31.

A fifth expansion, The Mountain Royals, was announced on October 16, 2023, and released on October 31. It introduces two new civilizations, the Armenians and the Georgians, as well as three new campaigns, featuring Tamar, Thoros the Great, and Ismail.

A story expansion, Victors and Vanquished, was announced on February 23, 2024, and released on March 14. It adds 19 scenarios by modder Ramsey Abdulrahim; 14 are remakes of his previous works, with five being new.

In October 2024, the expansion Chronicles: Battle for Greece was announced, featuring three ancient civilizations: Achaemenids, Athenians, and Spartans. It released on November 14 that year.

In March 2025, an eighth expansion was announced, set to be released in mid-April of the same year. The Three Kingdoms expansion, inspired by the historical era of the same name, introduced five new civilizations: Shu, Wei, Wu, Jurchens, and Khitans, and three new campaigns centered on Liu Bei, Cao Cao, and the Sun Clan. Unlike Dynasties of India, which split the Indians into four, the Chinese remained a playable civilization. Along with the expansion pack, an update was announced, emphasizing technical refinements and the introduction of new features. Moreover, a new scenario centered on Xie An was incorporated into Victors and Vanquished. It was released on May 6.

In September 2025, the expansion Chronicles: Alexander the Great was announced, introducing three new Chronicles civilizations: the Macedonians, Thracians, and Puru. It was released on October 14.

In December 2025, the expansion The Last Chieftains was announced, introducing three new civilizations: the Mapuche, Muisca, and Tupi. It was released on February 17, 2026.

In July 2026, the expansion The Viking Sagas was announced. The expansion added the Danes, Saxons, and Varangians as civilizations along with a three part campaign following the life of Harald Hardrada. It was released on September 22, 2026.

== Reception ==
Reception

Aggregate scores
Aggregator	Score
Metacritic	84/100
OpenCritic	92% recommend

Review score
Publication	Score
PC Gamer (UK)	78/100

Age of Empires II: Definitive Edition received "generally favorable" reviews according to review aggregator Metacritic with a score of 84/100 from 32 reviews. Fellow review aggregator OpenCritic assessed that the game received "mighty" approval, being recommended by 92% of critics. Windows Central's Cale Hunt praised the improved artwork, animations and quality of life additions but criticized the AI pathfinding and pointed out a need for further balancing. Fraser Brown from PC Gamer summarized the game as "A polished, wide-ranging update that brings the classic RTS into the modern age."

Some critics have argued that the game is "pay to win", pointing to the tendency for DLC civilizations to often be especially strong on release. However, frequent balance patches are made to the game and this is not a universal opinion.
