= List of 4X video games =

This is a list of 4X games. 4X is a subgenre of strategy video games. The term is a loose acronym of "explore, expand, exploit, and exterminate", coined in 1993 to describe the gameplay of Master of Orion. 4X games usually feature complex simulations of scientific research, economics, diplomacy, and social dynamics. Unlike computer wargames, they usually have more ways to win than through warfare, and they model the creation and evolution of an empire from its beginning. Games prior to Master of Orion have been retroactively identified as 4X games. Early precursors include the board games Outreach and Stellar Conquest, both published in the 1970s. Some early strategy video games, such as Andromeda Conquest (1982) and Cosmic Balance II (1983) incorporated what would later become elements of 4X games, but the first 4X video game was Reach for the Stars (1983). Because of the genre's focus on mouse-and-keyboard control schemes, most 4X games are available on personal computers, but examples exist on other platforms. Some 4X games include elements of real-time strategy, but 4X games are typically slow-paced.

== Legend ==
Video game platforms
AMI	Amiga	APPII	Apple II	ATR	Atari 8-bit computers
ATRST	Atari ST, Atari Falcon	BEOS	BeOS, including Haiku	C64	Commodore 64
CPC	Amstrad CPC	DOS	PC DOS / MS-DOS, Windows 3.X	DROID	Android
DS	Nintendo DS, DSiWare, iQue DS	GEN	Genesis / Mega Drive	iOS	iOS, iPhone, iPod, iPadOS, iPad, visionOS, Apple Vision Pro
LIN	Linux, SteamOS	MAC	Classic Mac OS, 2001 and before	NS	Nintendo Switch
OSX	macOS	PC98	PC-9800 series	PS1	PlayStation 1
PS3	PlayStation 3	PS4	PlayStation 4	PS5	PlayStation 5
PSV	PlayStation Vita	SAT	Sega Saturn	SNES	Super NES / Super Famicom / Super Comboy
Stadia	Google Stadia	WEB	Browser game	WIN	Windows, all versions Windows 95 and up
XB	Xbox, Xbox Live Arcade	XB360	Xbox 360, Xbox 360 Live Arcade	XBO	Xbox One
XBX/S	Xbox Series X/S	ZX	ZX Spectrum		

Types of releases
Compilation	A compilation, anthology or collection of several titles, usually (but not always) belonging to the same series
Early access	A game launched in early access is unfinished and thus might contain bugs and glitches or have some of the content missing
Episodic	An episodic video game that is released in batches over a period of time
Expansion	A large-scale DLC to an already existing game that adds new story, areas and additions and/or changes to the game's mechanics
Full release	A full release of a game that launched in early access first
Limited	A special release (often called "Limited" or "Collector's Edition") with bonus collector's material. Often provided to people who pre-order a game
Port	The game first appeared on a different platform and a port was made. The game is like the original, with few or no differences
Remake	The game is an enhanced remake of an original, made using a new engine and/or assets and thus containing completely new sound, graphics and possibly changes to the story and/or gameplay
Remaster	The game is a remaster of an original, released on the same or different platform, with (usually minor) changes to graphics, sound and/or gameplay
Rerelease	The game was re-released on the same platform with no or only minor changes

== List ==
Year	Title	Platform	Setting	Timekeeping	Developer	Publisher	Ref.
1977	Empire		Historical		Walter Bright, Chuck Simmons		
1983	Reach for the Stars	DOS, WIN, APPII, MAC, C64, AMI	Sci-fi (Space)		SSG		
1984	Imperium Galactum	APPII, ATR, C64	Sci-fi (Space)		SSI		
1984	Incunabula	DOS	Historical		Avalon Hill		
1985	Strategic Conquest	APPII, MAC	Historical		Peter Merrill, Delta Tao		
1987	Anacreon: Reconstruction 4021	DOS	Sci-fi (Space)		Thinking Machine Associates		
1987	Stellar Conflict	AMI	Sci-fi (Space)		PAR Software		
1987	Xconq				Stan Shebs, others		
1988	Reach for the Stars: The Conquest of the Galaxy - Third Edition	DOS, C64, APPII, AMI, MAC, PC98	Sci-fi (Space)		SSG		
1988	Stellar Crusade	ATRST, DOS, AMI	Sci-fi (Space)		SSI		
1990	Imperium	ATRST, DOS, AMI	Sci-fi (Space)		Intelligent Games		
1990	Spaceward Ho!	MAC, WIN, AMI	Sci-fi (Space)		Delta Tao		
1991	Armada 2525	DOS	Sci-fi (Space)		Interstel		
1991	Civilization	DOS, WIN, MAC, AMI, ATRST, SNES, PS1, SAT	Historical		MicroProse		
1992	Pax Imperia	MAC	Sci-fi (Space)		Changeling Software		
1992	VGA Planets	DOS	Sci-fi (Space)		Tim Wisseman		
1993	Master of Orion	DOS, MAC	Sci-fi (Space)		Simtex		
1993	Space Empires	WIN	Sci-fi (Space)		Malfador		
1994	Colonization	AMI, DOS, WIN, MAC	Historical		MicroProse		
1994	K240	AMI	Sci-fi (Space)		Gremlin Graphics		
1994	Master of Magic	DOS	Fantasy		Simtex		
1994	Reunion	AMI, DOS	Sci-fi (Space)		Digital Reality		
1995	Ascendancy	DOS, WIN, iOS	Sci-fi (Space)		The Logic Factory		
1995	Space Empires II	WIN	Sci-fi (Space)		Malfador		
1995	Stars!	WIN	Sci-fi (Space)		Jeff Johnson and Jeff McBride		
1996	Civilization II	MAC, PS1, WIN	Historical		MicroProse		
1996	Destiny: World Domination from Stone Age to Space Age	WIN	Historical		Dagger Interactive		
1996	Emperor of the Fading Suns	WIN	Sci-fi (Planet)		Holistic		
1996	Freeciv		Historical		Freeciv team		
1996	Master of Orion II: Battle at Antares	DOS, WIN, MAC	Sci-fi (Space)		Simtex		
1997	Fragile Allegiance	WIN, DOS	Sci-fi (Space)		Gremlin		
1997	Imperialism	MAC, WIN	Historical		Frog City		
1997	Imperium Galactica	DOS	Sci-fi (Space)		Digital Reality		
1997	Into the Void	DOS	Sci-fi (Space)		Adrenalin Entertainment		
1997	Pax Imperia: Eminent Domain	WIN, MAC	Sci-fi (Space)		Heliotrope Studios		
1997	Space Empires III	WIN	Sci-fi (Space)		Malfador		
1998	Star Wars: Rebellion	WIN	Sci-fi (Space)		Coolhand Interactive		
1999	Age of Wonders	WIN	Fantasy		Triumph		
1999	Civilization II: Test of Time	WIN	Historical, Fantasy or Sci-fi (Planet)		MicroProse		
1999	Civilization: Call to Power	BEOS, LIN, MAC, WIN	Historical and Sci-fi (Planet)		Activision		
1999	Imperialism II: Age of Exploration	OSX, WIN	Historical		Frog City		
1999	Malkari	WIN	Sci-fi		iMagic		
1999	Sid Meier's Alpha Centauri	WIN, LIN, MAC	Sci-fi (Planet)		Firaxis		
1999	Star Trek: Birth of the Federation	WIN	Sci-fi (Space)		MicroProse		
2000	Call to Power II	WIN	Historical and Sci-fi (Planet)		Activision		
2000	Imperium Galactica II: Alliances	WIN	Sci-fi (Space)		Digital Reality		
2000	Reach for the Stars (2000)	WIN	Sci-fi (Space)		SSG		
2000	Space Empires IV	WIN	Sci-fi (Space)		Malfador		
2001	Civilization III	WIN, MAC	Historical		Firaxis		
2002	Age of Wonders II: The Wizard's Throne	WIN	Fantasy		Triumph		
2002	Dominions: Priests, Prophets and Pretenders	WIN, LIN, OSX	Fantasy	Turn-based	Illwinter Game Design		
2002	Starships Unlimited	WIN	Sci-fi (Space)		Apezone		
2003	Age of Wonders: Shadow Magic	WIN	Fantasy		Triumph		
2003	Dominions II: The Ascension Wars	WIN, LIN, OSX	Fantasy	Turn-based	Illwinter Game Design		
2003	FreeCol	WIN, OSX, LIN	Historical		The Freecol Team		
2003	Galactic Civilizations	WIN	Sci-fi (Space)	Turn-based	Stardock		
2003	Master of Orion III	WIN, OSX	Sci-fi (Space)		Quicksilver		
2004	Anacreon: Imperial Conquest in the Far Future	WIN	Sci-fi		George Moromisato		
2004	Aurora	WIN	Sci-fi (Space)		Steve Walmsley		
2004	FreeOrion	LIN	Sci-fi (Space)		Various developers		
2005	Civilization IV	WIN, OSX	Historical		Firaxis		
2006	C-evo	WIN	Historical		Steffen Gerlach		
2006	Dominions 3: The Awakening	WIN, OSX, LIN	Fantasy	Turn-based	Illwinter Game Design		
2006	Galactic Civilizations II: Dread Lords	WIN	Sci-fi (Space)	Turn-based	Stardock		
2006	Space Empires V	WIN	Sci-fi (Space)		Malfador		
2006	Sword of the Stars	WIN	Sci-fi (Space)	Turn-based with real-time combat	Kerberos		
2007	Armageddon Empires	WIN	Sci-fi (Planet)	Turn-based	Cryptic Comet		
2007	Lost Empire	WIN	Sci-fi (Space)	Turn-based	Pollux Gamelabs		
2008	Civilization IV: Colonization	WIN	Historical		Firaxis		
2008	Civilization Revolution	PS3, DS, XB360	Historical		Firaxis		
2008	Shattered Suns	WIN	Sci-fi (Space)	Real-time	Clear Crown		
2008	Sins of a Solar Empire	WIN	Sci-fi (Space)	Real-time	Ironclad		
2009	AI War: Fleet Command	WIN	Sci-fi (Space)		Arcen Games		
2010	Armada 2526	WIN	Sci-fi (Space)		Ntronium Games		
2010	Civilization V	WIN, OSX, LIN	Historical		Firaxis		
2010	Distant Worlds	WIN	Sci-fi (Space)	Real-time	Code Force		
2010	Elemental: War of Magic	WIN	Fantasy	Turn-based	Stardock		
2010	Neptune's Pride	WEB	Sci-fi (Space)	Real-time	Iron Helmet Games		
2010	Star Ruler	WIN	Sci-fi (Space)	Real-time	Blind Mind Studios		
2011	Sword of the Stars II: The Lords of Winter	WIN	Sci-fi (Space)	Turn-based with real-time combat	Kerberos		
2012	Elemental: Fallen Enchantress	WIN	Fantasy	Turn-based	Stardock		
2012	Endless Space	WIN, OSX	Sci-fi (Space)	Turn-based	Amplitude Studios		
2012	Legends of Pegasus	WIN	Sci-fi (Space)	Turn-based	Novacore Studios		
2012	Sins of a Solar Empire: Rebellion	WIN	Sci-fi (Space)	Real-time	Ironclad		
2012	Warlock: Master of the Arcane	WIN	Fantasy	Turn-based	1C:Ino-Co Plus		
2013	Dominions 4: Thrones of Ascension	WIN, OSX, LIN	Fantasy	Turn-based	Illwinter Game Design		
2013	Eador: Masters of the Broken World	WIN	Fantasy		Snowbird Games		
2013	Lords of the Black Sun	WIN	Sci-fi (Space)	Turn-based	Arkavi Studios		
2013	Pandora: First Contact	WIN, OSX, LIN	Sci-fi (Planet)	Turn-based	Proxy Studios		
2013	StarDrive	WIN	Sci-fi (Space)	Real-time	Zer0sum Games		
2014	Age of Wonders III	WIN	Fantasy		Triumph		
2014	Civilization Revolution 2	iOS, DROID, PSV	Historical	Turn-based	Firaxis		
2014	Endless Legend	WIN, OSX	Fantasy	Turn-based	Amplitude Studios		
2014	Horizon	WIN	Sci-fi (Space)	Turn-based	L3O Interactive		
2014	Sid Meier's Civilization: Beyond Earth	WIN, LIN	Sci-fi (Planet)	Turn-based	Firaxis		
2014	Sorcerer King	WIN	Fantasy		Stardock		
2014	Star Ruler 2	WIN, OSX, LIN	Sci-fi (Space)	Real-time	Blind Mind Studios		
2014	Star Traders: 4X Empires	WIN	Sci-fi (Space)		Trese Brothers		
2014	Warlock II: The Exiled	WIN	Fantasy	Turn-based	1C:Ino-Co Plus		
2015	Galactic Civilizations III	WIN	Sci-fi (Space)	Turn-based	Stardock		
2015	Galactic Inheritors	WIN	Sci-fi (Space)	Turn-based	Argonauts Interactive		
2015	Hegemony III: Clash of the Ancients	WIN	Historical	Real-time with pause	Longbow Games		
2015	Predestination	WIN	Sci-fi (Space)	Turn-based	Brain and Nerd Ltd		
2015	Sid Meier's Starships	WIN	Sci-fi (Space)	Turn-based	Firaxis Games		
2015	StarDrive 2	WIN	Sci-fi (Space)	Turn-based	Zer0sum Games		
2015	Worlds of Magic		Fantasy		Wastelands Interactive		
2016	Civilization VI	WIN, OSX, LIN, PS4, XB360, NS	Historical		Firaxis Games		
2016	Falling Stars: War of Empires	WIN	Sci-fi (Space)	Turn-based	Riveted Games		
2016	Feudalism	WIN	Historical	Turn-based	IV Productions, Imagimotion Srl		
2016	Master of Orion Conquer the Stars	WIN, OSX, LIN	Sci-fi (Space)	Turn-based	NGD Studios		
2016	Stellaris	WIN, OSX, LIN, PS4	Sci-fi (Space)	Real-time	Paradox Interactive		
2016	The Battle of Polytopia	WIN, OSX, LIN, NS, iOS, DROID	Historical	Turn-based	Midjiwan AB		
2017	Dominions 5: Warriors of the Faith	WIN, OSX, LIN	Fantasy	Turn-based	Illwinter Game Design		
2017	Endless Space 2	WIN, OSX	Sci-fi (Space)	Turn-based	Amplitude Studios		
2017	Oriental Empires	WIN	Historical	Turn-based	Iceberg Interactive		
2017	Stars in Shadow	WIN	Sci-fi (Space)	Turn-based	Ashdar Games		
2017	Thea: The Awakening	WIN, XBO, PS4, NS	Fantasy	Turn-based	MuHa Games		
2018	Aggressors: Ancient Rome	WIN	Historical	Turn-based	Kubat Software		
2018	Space Tyrant	WIN	Space		Blue Wizard Digital		
2018	Warhammer 40,000: Gladius - Relics of War	WIN, OSX, LIN	Sci-fi (Planet)		Proxy Studios		
2018	Northgard	WIN, LIN, XBO, PS4, NS	Norse mythology		Shiro Games		
2019	Age of Wonders: Planetfall	WIN, PS4, XBO	Space	Turn-based	Triumph Studios		
2019	Interstellar Space: Genesis	WIN	Sci-fi (Space)	Turn-based	Praxis Games		
2019	Thea 2: The Shattering	WIN, XBO, NS	Fantasy	Turn-based	MuHa Games		
2020	Imperiums: Greek Wars	WIN	Historical, Mythological	Turn-based	Kube Games		
2020	Pax Nova	WIN	Sci-fi (Space)	Turn-based	GreyWolf Entertainment		
2020	Astra Exodus	WIN	Sci-fi (Space)	Turn-based	Atomic Kaiser		
2020	Shadow Empire	WIN	Sci-fi (Planet), Post-apocalyptic	Turn-based	Matrix Games		
2021	Humankind	WIN, OSX, Stadia	Historical	Turn-based	Amplitude Studios		
2021	Old World	WIN, OSX, LIN	Historical		Mohawk Games		
2022	Distant Worlds 2	WIN	Space	Real-time with pause	CodeForce		
2022	Dune: Spice Wars	WIN	Sci-fi (Planet)	Real-time with pause	Shiro Games		
2022	Theocracy (video game)	WIN	Historical	Turn-based	Atlantic Workshop		
2022	Galactic Civilizations IV	WIN	Sci-fi (Space)	Turn-based	Stardock		
2022	Master of Magic	WIN	Fantasy	Turn-based	MuHa Games		
2023	Age of Wonders 4	WIN	Fantasy	Turn-based	Triumph		
2024	Dominions 6: Rise of the Pantokrator	WIN, OSX, LIN	Fantasy	Turn-based	Illwinter Game Design		
2024	Millennia	WIN	Historical		C Prompt Games		
2024	Ara: History Untold	WIN	Historical	Turn-based	Oxide Games		
2025	Civilization VII	WIN, OSX, LIN, PS4, PS5, XBO, XBX/S, NS	Historical		Firaxis Games		

== Games with 4X modes ==
The following list contains games with 4X modes/sections, but whose regular gameplay is not a 4X game.

Year	Title	Platform	Setting	Developer	Publisher	Notes	Ref.
1990	Star Control	AMI, CPC, C64, DOS, GEN, ZX	Sci-fi	Toys for Bob			
1994	Wing Commander: Armada	DOS	Sci-fi	Origin Systems			
1996	Star Control 3	DOS, MAC	Sci-fi	Legend Entertainment			
2001	Emperor: Battle for Dune	WIN	Sci-fi	Westwood Studios		Campaign mode	
2003	Rise of Nations	WIN, MAC	Historical	Big Huge Games		Conquer The World mode	
2004	Rise of Nations: Thrones and Patriots	WIN, MAC	Historical	Big Huge Games		Conquer The World mode	
2004	Star Wars: Battlefront	WIN	Sci-fi	Pandemic Studios		Galactic Conquest mode	
2005	Star Wars: Battlefront II	WIN, XB	Sci-fi	Pandemic Studios		Galactic Conquest mode	
2006	Star Wars: Empire at War	WIN, MAC	Sci-fi	Petroglyph Games		Galactic Conquest mode	
2006	Star Wars: Empire at War: Forces of Corruption	WIN, MAC	Sci-fi	Petroglyph Games		Galactic Conquest mode	
2006	The Lord of the Rings: The Battle for Middle-earth II	WIN	Fantasy	EA Los Angeles		War of the Ring mode	
2006	The Lord of the Rings: The Battle for Middle-earth II: The Rise of the Witch-king	WIN	Fantasy	EA Los Angeles		War of the Ring mode	
2006	Warhammer 40,000: Dawn of War: Dark Crusade	WIN	Sci-fi, Fantasy	Relic Entertainment		Campaign mode	
2008	Command & Conquer 3: Kane's Wrath	WIN, XB	Sci-fi	EA Los Angeles		Global Conquest mode	
2008	Warhammer 40,000: Dawn of War: Soulstorm	WIN	Sci-fi, Fantasy	Relic Entertainment		Campaign mode	
2017	Starpoint Gemini Warlords	WIN	Sci-fi (Space)	Little Green Men Games			

== See also ==
- List of strategy video games
