= Xconq =

1987 open-source strategy video game

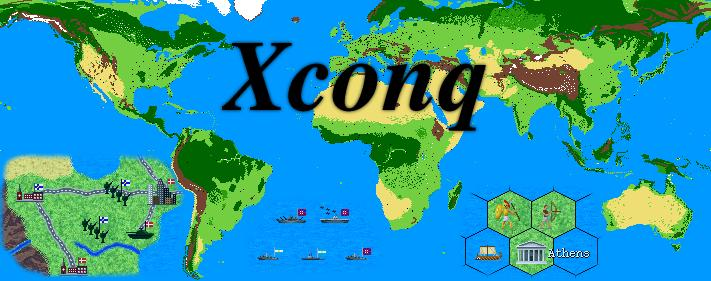
- Developers: Stan Shebs, Greg Fisher, Robert Forsman, Alain Brossard, Michael Peters, etc.
- Release: 1987 (Version 1.0)
- Platform: Unix/Linux/X11, Macintosh, Amiga and Windows
- Type: Single-player, multiplayer, 4X, turn-based strategy
- License: GPL-2.0-or-later
- Website: sourceware.org/xconq/
- Repository: xconq.cvs.sourceforge.net

Xconq is an open-source computer strategy game. This multiplayer video game was first posted to comp.sources.games, on 9 July 1987. Xconq is released as free and open-source software, under the terms of the GNU GPL-2.0-or-later.

== Gameplay ==
Originally a straightforward clone of Empire, later versions included the ability to define rulesets for different kinds of games, first using a Forth-like syntax, then a more powerful version based on Lisp syntax. It was also ported to other computer systems, including Macintosh, Amiga, and Windows.

Xconq is designed to be portable and re-definable. The default ruleset is similar to Empire, but the ruleset, graphics, and maps can be altered to represent different time periods and strategic scales. Example rulesets provided with the game include Napoleonic strategy, Beirut guerilla fighting, World War II grand strategy, and Godzilla destroying Tokyo. It can be played by multiple human or AI-controlled players over a network or via hot seat play.

== History ==
Stan Shebs started working on a simple Empire clone in 1986, initially using curses for its interface, then adding an X10 interface. He posted this version to comp.sources.games in July 1987. It used a map based on squares rather than hexes, and supported multiple players by exploiting X's capability for a single program to open windows on multiple displays, although it accepted input from only the player whose turn it was; other players could not even scroll their map display. Even this first version included support for three rulesets (the "standard" Empire-like game, a Napoleonic-era game, and ancient Greeks), but they were defined by C structures and had to be compiled in.

Shebs switched the game to use hex-based maps, added a postfix language to define the ruleset to be used when a game started, and changed the X interface to allow all players to interact simultaneously; these versions were numbered 2, 3, and 4, but were not released widely. After the addition of an X11 interface written by Chris Peterson, version 5.0 was posted to comp.sources.games (as "xconq5") in June 1988.

1989 saw the first attempt at a client/server version, uconq.

The Macintosh port was developed in 1993.

Although work had started on version 7.5, there has been little development since 2004, with the last CVS commit made in 2007.

== See also ==
- List of open source games

== See also ==
- List of 4X video games
