= Star Fleet I: The War Begins =

1984 video game

- Developer: Interstel
- Publisher: Interstel
- Designer: Trevor Sorensen
- Series: Star Fleet
- Platforms: Apple II, Mac, Atari 8-bit, Atari ST, Commodore 64, Amiga, IBM PC
- Release: 1984
- Genre: Turn-based strategy
- Mode: Single-player

Star Fleet I: The War Begins is a 1984 strategy video game designed by Trevor Sorensen and developed by Interstel (some versions by Cygnus Multimedia). It was released for Apple II, MS-DOS, and Commodore 64. Versions for the Commodore 128 (bundled together as Commodore 64/128, though it included a discrete version for the 128 with 80-column support), Atari ST, and Atari 8-bit computers were released in 1986 and versions for the Amiga and Mac were released in 1987. The game was successful enough to spawn sequels which are collectively known as the Star Fleet series.

== Gameplay ==
The game resembles the Star Trek text game. The player is a new graduate of Starfleet Academy in command of a starship. The United Galactic Alliance (UGA) is at war with the Krellans and Zaldrons, so the player has plenty of combatants to engage from the beginning of the game.

Eschewing digital graphics, Star Fleet I presents all its information in color ASCII characters. Gameplay centers on two main activities: navigation and combat. Navigation takes place on the Main Computer GUI. It consists of a main star chart map, the player's current position, and visual displays. Other information may be accessed using the appropriate commands. Navigation may be conducted manually or automatically.

Each area, or quadrant, on the map is displayed as a series of numbers representing asteroids, starbases, and enemy ships present. The ship's long-range sensors can detect entities in adjacent quadrants, while short-range sensors detect items in the current quadrant. The ship also has a limited number of probes for very long-range exploration.

Combat is the primary activity of Star Fleet I, and is initiated whenever the player's starship enters a hostile area. Each quadrant may contain a number of starbases, space marines, and Krellan (maximum of five) or Zaldron (often just one) enemy ships. The player may find hostile quadrants by chance or may be summoned by a starbase under attack.

Enemies automatically engage the player's ship with phasers. While the player's ship outmatches Krellan starships, several enemy starships can prove dangerous. Zaldron ships may also be present but cloaked. The Zaldron ships must de-cloak before engaging the player, also using phasers as a primary weapon.

The player may either destroy or disable enemy starships. Disabled starships can then be captured and tractored to friendly starbases.

The player has a lethal arsenal at their disposal with which to engage the enemy: phasers, torpedoes, and mines. Torpedoes destroy enemy ships (provided they strike the target), while the other weapons may disable (or ultimately destroy) enemy ships. When disabled, a ship may be captured by ordering space marines to board the vessel, and automatic combat between the enemy's crew and the marines will then ensue. If victorious, the player receives some power and a number of prisoners. The captured ship may then be towed to a starbase.

However, during capture attempts, enemy spies or prisoners may escape on the player's ship undetected and disable vital systems. Such situations result in an "Intruder Alert", forcing the player to search for the culprit.

As a last resort, the player may to choose to self-destruct his ship, which will adversely affect the game's final score.

After completing a mission, the player is rated on several factors, including number of enemies eliminated or captured and starbases rescued. Successful missions may result in promotions or commendations.

== Reception ==
Reception

Review scores
Publication	Score
Computer Gaming World	3.5/5
Info	2.5/5
inCider	4/4

Creative Computing in 1984 wished that Star Fleet I's excellent documentation would become the norm in the industry. Approving of its use of color and sound, the magazine concluded "Star Trek fans rejoice. [It] is a truly captivating game". "It's not just a game, it's darned near a career", Jerry Pournelle said in BYTE, praising its career progression, color, and sound. While criticizing inefficient RAM use and other minor flaws, he wrote that Star Fleet I "is likely to drive me crazy but I keep coming back for more", describing it as "frankly better than the Star Trek game I wrote". Mark Bausman reviewed the game for Computer Gaming World, and stated that "Star Fleet One is a truly remarkable update of the classic Star Trek game". inCider gave the Apple II version four stars out of four, describing it as "ideal for anyone who enjoys an addicting space game". Info gave the Amiga version two-plus stars out of five, criticizing the similarity between Star Fleet I and Star Trek games. The magazine criticized the graphics and thought that it was directly ported from the IBM-PC version. Game reviewers Hartley and Pattie Lesser complimented the game in their "The Role of Computers" column in Dragon #118 (1987), and said that the game brought a sense of realism.

In a 1992 survey of science fiction games, Computer Gaming World gave the title five stars of five, calling it a "superb rendition of the 'main-frame' Star Trek", despite noting the graphics as "primitive". A 1994 survey in the magazine of strategic space games set in the year 2000 and later gave the game three-plus stars out of five, stating that the game should have had a modern update, unlike Empire with Empire Deluxe from 1993.

In 1996, Computer Gaming World declared Starfleet I the 150th-best computer game ever released.
