= Incunabula (video game) =

1984 video game

- Developer: Avalon Hill
- Publisher: Avalon Hill
- Designer: Steve Estvanik
- Series: Civilization
- Platform: MS-DOS
- Release: 1984
- Genre: 4X

Incunabula is a video game designed by Steve Estvanik and released by Avalon Hill for IBM PC compatibles in 1984. It is the original computerized version of the Civilization board game, preceding Sid Meier's Civilization which was published in 1991.

== Gameplay ==
The gameplay loosely follows the rules of Francis Tresham's Civilization board game. It consists of three type of "scenarios", Incunabula, Imperium, and Traders. Incunabula resembles the board game the most. One to three players can play and the computer players can be randomly assigned basis of law and "personality". The personalities determine how likely a computer player is to attack you. Personalities are:

- Choleric
- Phlegmatic
- Melancholic
- Sanguine

The choices for basis of law are:

- Theocracy
- Oligarchy
- Utopia
- Khanate

Combat follows Civilization rules with a one for one unit loss. There are 18 technologies, called "Arcana," available to obtain via the use of collected trade goods, and each player's progress is tracked through phases such as clan and tribe. The game is won on the basis of accumulating trade.

The different laws and personalities and random starting positions are the only game variations. There is just one map and difficulty can only be adjusted in terms of the frequency of randomly-occurring disasters.

== Reception ==
Jerry Pournelle in 1985 reported that Avalon Hill's Incunabula and By Fire and Sword "snaffled off more of my time than I could afford". Computer Gaming World that year noted the resemblance to Avalon Hill's Civilization board game and wondered why the company did not call the video game Computer Civilization, and cautioned that because of the lack of map variations or difficulty levels, "the probable solitaire life of the game could be rather limited". It nonetheless concluded, "Incunabula is an interesting and enjoyable multi-player game. The combination of combat, good trading, and diplomacy will give a wide variety of gamers something worth a closer look". In 1990 and 1993, the magazine gave it three stars out of five.

== See also ==
- List of 4X video games
