= Stellar Crusade =

1988 video game

- Developer: Norm Koger
- Publisher: Strategic Simulations
- Platforms: MS-DOS, Atari ST, Amiga
- Release: NA: 1988
- Genre: 4X
- Modes: single-player, multiplayer

Stellar Crusade is a 4X strategy video game released in 1988 by Strategic Simulations. Players control one or both of two spacefaring empires at war with each other, depending on whether it is played in a single-player campaign or multiplayer.

== Gameplay ==
Two spacefaring empires, the Corporate League and the People's Holy Republic, clash as both expand into the same area. Players always control the Corporate League; either the computer or another player can control the People's Holy Republic. Gameplay is divided into two phases: economic and movement. The economic phase consists of managing planets, their production, and their resources. The movement phase allows players to position their space fleets. Once both phases complete, combat is resolved. The game is turn-based.

== Release ==
The game was initially released for the Atari ST and was ported to MS-DOS by October 1988. The Amiga version was ported by January 1990.

== Reception ==
Hosea Battles of Computer Gaming World criticized the game's manual as being useless in explaining the highly complex gameplay but said that Stellar Crusade can be "very satisfying" if one puts forth the substantial effort needed to understand it. Computer Gaming World editor Russell Sipe later cited "inside sources at SSI" as saying that a dozen pages had been removed from the manual to make it "less imposing". George Miller of STart wrote that it is "not a beginner's game" but recommended it to veteran strategy gamers who are looking for a challenge. Steve Panak of Antic said that he had hoped for a rival to Empire: Wargame of the Century. Its "complexity level requires a warning label", he warned. Panak concluded that for those willing to give the "substantial commitment of time" required to learn how to play, "you won't find a more detailed outer space simulation on this planet, or any other". Mike Woodhouse reviewed Stellar Crusade for Games International magazine, giving it 4 stars out of 5, and stated that "this is a game that almost couldn't fail with me. I'm glad to report that it didn't".

Computer Gaming World's retrospective on strategy games in 1992 described it as "simply not fun" even when ignoring the problems with the documentation. In an early-2000s retrospective, Bruce Geryk of GameSpot called it "a failed experiment" due to its complexity but said it was the first 4X game to focus so strongly on economics and resource exploitation.
