= The Battle of Polytopia =

2016 video game

- Developer: Midjiwan AB
- Publisher: Midjiwan AB
- Producer: Felix af Ekenstam
- Composer: Robin af Ekenstam
- Platforms: Android; iOS; Windows; macOS; Linux; Nintendo Switch
- Release: iOS; February 2016; Android; December 1, 2016; macOS, Windows; August 4, 2020; Switch; October 13, 2022
- Genre: Turn-based strategy
- Modes: Single-player, multiplayer

The Battle of Polytopia is a 2016 4X turn-based strategy game developed and published by Midjiwan AB. Players take control of a tribe as they build an empire and attempt to defeat the other tribes across a procedurally generated world. Each tribe starts the game with a unique ability, though all have access to the same technology tree. As players explore the world map, they construct and upgrade cities, research new technologies, and produce units used to battle the other tribes. The game has two modes, one which requires the player to obtain the highest score in a 30-turn time limit, and the other requires the player to defeat all other tribes in combat to win. Polytopia can be played in single-player against AI-controlled tribes, or through local or online multiplayer.

The game was created by Felix af Ekenstam, who began drawing its concept art in 2012. He sought to create a strategy game containing the simple mechanics that were common to mobile games at the time, but without a focus on microtransactions. The Battle of Polytopia was originally called Super Tribes, but was changed to its current title due to trademark issues. It was first released in February 2016 for iOS. The game received mixed reviews from critics, who highlighted the graphics and found the gameplay simple and approachable, but lacking in depth compared to other 4X titles. After release, Midjiwan produced several free updates and paid downloadable content (DLC) expansions. By 2025, The Battle of Polytopia reached 25 million downloads across mobile platforms.

== Gameplay ==
A gameplay screenshot depicting the player conquering a village at a set point around the world and converting it into a city

The Battle of Polytopia is a 4X turn-based strategy game. Players take control of a tribe as they work to grow their nation and help it dominate the world. The game is set in a procedurally generated world made of square tiles. At the start, players choose a single tribe from several options, which are inspired by historical culture groups. Each tribe has access to the same technology tree, though they begin the game with a single distinct ability on this tree. Tribes include the Xin-xi, which is based on the civilizations of East Asia and begins with the ability to climb mountains, and the Norse-inspired Bardur, which can hunt animals.

Each player begins with a small settlement and a unit that they can use to explore the world map. On their turn, players can move all of their units and spend a resource called stars. Cities generate stars, which can be spent to unlock new abilities on the technology tree, create more units to wage war, or collect materials to upgrade cities and allow them to support more soldiers. Upgrading cities allows the player to choose between one of two benefits, such as allowing the settlement to generate extra stars every turn, or send out a messenger that explores the map. Players gain new cities by conquering villages at set points around the world.

The game has two competitive modes: "Domination" and "Perfection". In Perfection, the player has a 30-turn time limit to gain a high score. Points for the score are earned by several activities, such as by exploring the map or collecting materials. Special challenges grant the player powerful buildings that improve cities and give more points. For example, the player could connect several settlements through trade routes to gain one of these buildings. In Domination, the player must defeat all other tribes in combat to achieve victory. The game grants players a rating depending on how many turns they took to defeat their opponents; higher ratings are awarded by achieving victory in a smaller number of turns. The Battle of Polytopia can be played both as a single-player game, or through multiplayer in a local or online setting. In single-player, the tribes are controlled by an AI of varying difficulty. Matches with online multiplayer can be set to be "Ranked", where the player can improve their rank by performing better in games against other players.

== Development ==
The Battle of Polytopia was created by Felix af Ekenstam, a Swedish freelancer who developed Flash games. He founded the game's developer indie game studio Midjiwan AB and was its sole employee at first. Ekenstam began drawing concept art in 2012, and worked on the title in his spare time until its release. Ekenstam intended for Polytopia to be a strategy game that featured the simplicity common with other mobile games, and without heavy focus on microtransactions. Midjiwan released several updates for the game after release; the company's CEO Christian Lövstedt said that the team tested various new ideas and concepts for gameplay, but mentioned that studio eliminated "90% of everything it tests". Ekenstam related that he regularly kept contact with players on social media to hint at new gameplay elements and ask for feedback. Polytopia was originally created through Adobe Flash, but was later developed through Unity.

The game was originally released for iOS in February 2016 under the name Super Tribes. The first release of the game had only five tribes, and the 30-turn game mode. In June 2016, the game's name was changed to The Battle of Polytopia due to trademark issues. A port for Android was released on December 1, 2016. Online multiplayer that was cross-platform between iOS and Android was added on February 15, 2018. Versions for Windows and macOS were released through Steam on August 4, 2020. The Battle of Polytopia was added as a feature to Tesla cars on December 25, 2020, followed by a port for Nintendo Switch on October 13, 2022.

Midjiwan added another five tribes to Polytopia by the end of 2016, bringing the game's total to ten. A downloadable content (DLC) tribe called the Aquarion tribe was launched in 2018. Unlike the other civilizations, the Aquarion is based around water and has special units such as a crab. Another DLC nation called the Elyrion was launched on May 24, 2018. The Elyrion has a unique technology that allows them to transform animals into soldiers. The tribe also controls a dragon "super unit" that can fly and shoot fire. A third DLC tribe called the Polaris was released on June 14, 2019, after being hinted at by Midjiwan back in 2017. The Polaris is a tundra-based civilization that can freeze the map using a special unit, and they can earn additional resources depending on how much of the world is frozen. The tribe has unique troops, including archers that freeze opponents and the "Gaami", powerful beings that specialize in ice magic. A fourth DLC tribe called the Cymanti was added on February 17, 2021. The nation features special insect-like units and poisonous fungi.

A new version of the game called Moonrise was released on Steam in August 2020, and then for mobile platforms on November 23 the same year. The update added customizable avatars for opponents in multiplayer matches, and a third "Creative" mode used to customize world maps. Midjiwan altered the game's technology tree with a "Diplomacy" expansion in May 2022, allowing players to arrange peace treaties between tribes and hire new units called Cloaks. Two DLCs containing decorative skins for the tribes were released in June 2023; a third skin pack for the Oumaji, Kickoo, and Zebasi tribes followed in July of that same year. An update called Path of the Ocean was launched on November 21, 2023. The patch overhauled the game's water-based technologies, units, and buildings, and added new structures such as bridges. Three new skins for the Ai-Mo, Yădakk, and Quetzali tribes were added on December 20, 2023.

Polytopia was released through Apple Arcade on March 11, 2024, and included all of the skins and DLC tribes. By then, the game had been downloaded 20 million times across mobile platforms. The Aquarion tribe was revised in August 2024 to give some of its units mermaid tails, allowing them to move faster in water. The update further granted the Aquarion a unique technology that allows them to flood tiles on the map, allowing water-restricted units to move on land. A skin for the Aquarion tribe was added with an update in November 2024, alongside balance changes. A game mode featuring weekly challenges where players compete to get the highest score on unique map seed was added in March 2025. The Polaris civilization received a fire-themed skin called the Solaris later that year.

Midjiwan has held several charitable fundraisers related to The Battle of Polytopia. Users who bought the Zebasi tribe would fund solar power developments in Africa, and the company donated over $185,000 by October 2021. The developers held a fundraising campaign from April 22 to April 28, 2024 and tied it to a new "Midnight" skin for the Elyrion tribe: the purchase of in-game items used by the Elyrion would be converted into real-life donations that would fund the planting of trees. In 2025, a competitive esports scene was introduced with a world championship event. The event had a prize pool of $10,000 USD. By that year, Polytopia had been downloaded over 25 million times on mobile platforms. The first world championship event ended on December 8, 2025. The player ArthurL248 won the event and defeated the other five competitors, claiming the main prize of $4,000 USD.

== Reception ==
Reception

Aggregate score
Aggregator	Score
Metacritic	72/100

Review scores
Publication	Score
Nintendo Life	6/10
Nintendo World Report	7/10
PCMag	3.5/5
TouchArcade	4.5/5

According to the review aggregator website Metacritic, The Battle of Polytopia received "mixed or average reviews" for its PC and Nintendo Switch versions. Many critics felt that the mechanics of The Battle of Polytopia were simplistic and easy to learn. Gamezebo said that the game was a good introduction to the 4X genre without the complexity of similar games like Civilization, and Nintendo World Report found the game challenging despite its simple rules. Nintendo Life called the game a "gentle introduction to an often-overwhelming genre" but said that players used to the complexities of 4X gameplay would quickly lose interest.

Some reviewers highlighted the graphics. TouchArcade found the art to be well-suited for mobile devices, and PCMag compared them to the graphics of Crossy Road, declaring them distinct and attractive. On the other hand, Nintendo World Report wrote that the art style was difficult to parse later on in matches, finding the maps to be difficult to manage as more units were created. The tribes had a mixed reception. PCMag considered each of the nations appealing because of their distinct designs, while Nintendo World Report said that the lack of unique leaders for the tribes made them feel boring.

Reviewers criticized the game's technology tree. PCMag found the technologies too simplistic, adding that the warring with the other tribes could be annoying and limiting the player's ability to focus on other tasks. Nintendo Life and Nintendo World Resort disliked that every tribe would use the same technologies, both stating that the later stages of the game were less appealing. TouchArcade said that the rounds felt unique and encouraged players to try new strategies for victory, while Nintendo Life wrote that every game felt too similar to the last.

== See also ==
- List of turn-based strategy video games
- List of 4X video games
