= Spaceward Ho! =

1990 video game

- Developers: Delta Tao Software; Mobilefreon (Palm); Ariton (iOS)
- Publishers: Delta Tao Software; New World Computing (DOS, Win, Amiga); Mobilefreon (Palm); Ariton (iOS)
- Designers: Joe Williams; Peter Commons
- Artist: Howard Vives
- Platforms: iOS, Android, Mac OS, Mac OS X (before 10.7), Palm OS, Microsoft Windows (older version), Amiga (older version)
- Release: 1990 (Mac); 1992 (DOS/Win); 1994 (Amiga)
- Genres: 4X, Turn-based strategy
- Modes: single-player, multiplayer

The Spaceward Ho! icon, showing a planet wearing a cowboy hat.

Spaceward Ho! is a turn-based science fiction computer strategy game that was written by Peter Commons, designed by Joe Williams and published by Delta Tao Software. The first version was released in 1990, and further upgrades followed regularly; the current version, 5.0.5, was released on July 8, 2003. It has received wide recognition in the Macintosh community, for example, being inducted into the Macworld Game Hall of Fame.

Spaceward Ho! can be categorized in the 4X game genre (eXplore, eXpand, eXploit, eXterminate) with a theme of galactic conquest. It took many elements of its design from the earlier Reach for the Stars, but expanded on many of that game's basic themes while taking advantage of the larger memory and better graphics available on the Mac platform.

Version 5 is available for iOS, Android, Classic Mac OS, and Mac OS X versions before 10.7 (there is no universal binary) and Palm OS. Version 4 is also available for Windows and version 2 for Amiga.

== Gameplay ==
The gameplay of Spaceward Ho! focuses on efficiently extracting the resources of conquered worlds while correctly anticipating and countering opponents' actions.

Spaceward Ho! can be played against a computer AI. Previous versions of the game also allowed LAN-based networked play, but this feature has been disabled in the Mac OS X version. At one time there was multiplayer play over the internet at spacewardho.net, but as of 2025 that domain now serves adult ads. It has a very simple gameplay compared with most other games in the genre (such as Master of Orion). Depending on the initial settings, games take from about ten minutes to an hour. Its small but dedicated fanbase considers the simplicity to be elegance, and its designers boast that it has gotten faster and more intuitive to play with each new version. All unnecessary complexity has been stripped from the game, resulting in a fast-paced game that still manages to be very engaging.

The core of the game is the two-dimensional map of "planets". Each "planet" has three characteristics: temperature, gravity, and metal. Temperature and gravity are both used to determine how fast colonies can grow and how large they can become (based on the preferred temperature and gravity for the colonizer, which is different for each player); the difference is that a player may spend money to change the temperature ("terraforming") while gravity cannot be changed. Colonies with low population take a certain amount of money per turn to support, while colonies with high population earn money for their owner. Metal can, with money expenditure, be mined for use with shipbuilding. A planet's stats are unknown until explored (to get current info on a planet, a player must have ships in orbit with no enemies present). Travel between planets is via hyperspace (ships cannot encounter each other except at planets), and the time it takes depends on the distance between the origin and the destination on the map, as well as on the speed of the ship in question.

Ships are built with money (representing renewable resources) and metal (representing non-renewable resources). Money and metal are available instantly, wherever needed. There are several different kinds of ships, including the basic Fighter, a Scout with longer range but weaker weapons, a Colony Ship used to found new colonies, Satellites which are cheap but cannot move from the world at which they are built, and in recent versions a few others as well, such as the Tanker and Dreadnought. Each ship has a ranking in each of five technologies: range (determining how far a ship can fly before refueling), speed (determining how quickly ships reach their destinations and who shoots first in a battle), weapons, shields, and "miniaturization". Higher-tech ships cost more money and metal, with the exception of ships with high "miniaturization" which take far more money but less metal. Miniaturization is much less effective when applied to Colony Ships, compared to other types of ships. Ships cannot be upgraded, although old ships can be scrapped to retrieve a portion of their metal. When a ship is destroyed in battle, a smaller portion can also be recovered. The first ship of a given design costs two to four times as much as subsequent units, to account for research and design costs.

There is no ground combat; ships that face an undefended enemy colony simply bombard it from orbit until they or the entire planet population is dead. The planet can then be recolonized by the victor's species. If a battle lasts into the second round of firing, the participants will get information on what happened; if it ends in only one round, the loser will know only that he lost.

In addition to spending on supporting colonies, terraforming planets, mining planets, and building ships, players can spend money on technological research. This raises the available maximum for each of the five ship technologies. There is also a sixth type of research, "Radical", which gives unpredictable advantages such as improved terraforming, information about distant planets, or a temporary advantage in one tech. Most spending in the game follows the law of diminishing returns: it is more effective to spend lightly but constantly on a given tech or planet for a long period of time than to spend heavily for a short period of time. For example, a novice player might reason that allocating 20% of one's income to mining a particular planet would yield twice as much metal as allocating 10%; in fact, it yields only 40% more metal.

A pseudo-logarithmic bar graph displays the player's spending allocations. The player manipulates the bars with the mouse to allocate spending. As one bar is lengthened, the lengths of the other bars are automatically shortened (and vice versa).

== Development ==
The Windows and MS-DOS versions of the game were developed by Presage Software.

== Ports ==
- Spaceward Ho! for iOS was released in March 2012 by Ariton.
- Spaceward Ho! for Android was released in March 2013 by Ariton.

== Reception ==
Reception

Review score
Publication	Score
Computer Gaming World	4/5

Computer Gaming World praised Spaceward Ho!, calling it "the Holy Grail of strategic computer games – the entertaining, introductory strategy game", especially for multiple players over a network. A February 1994 survey of space war games gave it a grade of A, stating that Spaceward Ho! "drew in many non-wargamer types with the use of clever bells and whistles". A 1994 survey of strategic space games set in the year 2000 and later gave the game four stars out of five, criticizing the cover art but stating that it "offers a fine 'beer and pretzels' game of economic/military space conquest ... Great gameplay and graphics with a touch of crass". Spaceward Ho! v. 3.0 for the Macintosh was reviewed in 1993 in Dragon #196 by Hartley, Patricia, and Kirk Lesser in "The Role of Computers" column. The reviewers gave the game 4 out of 5 stars. The game was reviewed in 1994 in Dragon #202 by Sandy Petersen in the "Eye of the Monitor" column. Petersen gave the solo version of the game 2 out of 5 stars, and the multiplayer version 3 stars.

Next Generation reviewed the Macintosh version of Spaceward Ho 4.0, rating it three stars out of five, and stated that "If you already own a copy, now is definitely time to step up to a new level of play."

In 1996, Next Generation listed Spaceward Ho! as number 52 on their "Top 100 Games of All Time", citing its "deceptive level of depth", high replay value, and eight-player mode. Wil Wheaton called it one of his favorite games.

== See also ==
- List of 4X video games
