= Stars in Shadow =

2017 video game

- Developer: Ashdar Games
- Publisher: Iceberg Interactive
- Platform: Microsoft Windows
- Release: 19 January 2017
- Genre: Turn-based strategy
- Mode: Single-player

Stars in Shadow is a turn-based, 4X science-fiction computer strategy game developed by Ashdar Games and published by Iceberg Interactive for Windows PC in 2017.

== Premise ==
Stars in Shadow is set in a galaxy which suffered from a grand-scale war between many civilizations and alien races, known as the so-called 'Great War'. Before the Great War the galaxy enjoyed a golden age, but the Great War ended this period of prosperity. Three thousand years later, the galaxy is currently in the progress of rebuilding.

== Gameplay ==
The player controls one of seven factions, consisting of humans and six alien races: the Phidi, Orthin, Yoral, Ashdar and the Gremak. The goal of the game is to "explore the galaxy, rediscover and colonize distant worlds, and build an interstellar empire". Players also engage in turn-based fleet combat, a core mechanic.

The 'Legacies' DLC adds an eighth playable faction, the Tinkers.

== Development ==
Stars in Shadow was developed by Ashdar Games, a small studio consisting of programmer Sven Olsen and artist Jim Francis. Francis is responsible for the game's comic book art style. He is also known as the author and artist of the full-color web-based science fiction comic Outsider. In an interview with GameStar, Olsen named Master of Orion II as his main inspiration for the game.

The game went in Early Access in September 2016. IndieGames.com noted its style as "being probably its most striking element." PC Gamer reviewed the game when it entered Early Access and made note of the diversity of its playable races and the space combat gameplay, but reviewer T.J. Hafer stated that it was too early to tell if the "will soar above the clouds and become a respected peer in the space 4X renaissance."

Stars in Shadow left Early Access in January 2017, with Forbes' Erik Kain comparing its art style to Master of Orion. Logan Booker of Kotaku Australia also compared the look of the game to Master of Orion and to Star Control.

In August 2017 a DLC called 'Legacies' was announced. Stars in Shadow: Legacies adds a new faction called the Tinkers, bringing the number of playable alien races from six to seven. Originally slated for a September 2017 release date, the DLC was moved to October 2017. According to the developer, this was done "to release a DLC that meets your expectations (and our own)". The Legacies DLC was released on October 19, 2017.

== Reception ==
Stars in Shadow received a positive reception from press. The game currently holds a 75 metascore on Metacritic. Tom Chick of Quarter to Three reviewed the game with four out of five stars, praising its ability to focus on the most important aspects of 4X games. Hooked Gamers also praised the turn-based combat and its depth.
