= Space Tyrant =

2018 video game

- Developer: Blue Wizard Digital
- Publisher: Blue Wizard Digital
- Platform: Microsoft Windows
- Release: NA: February 2018
- Genre: 4X
- Mode: Single-player

Space Tyrant is a strategy video game developed by Blue Wizard Digital. It uses a streamlined version of 4X gameplay in which players conquer the galaxy as an evil tyrant.

== Gameplay ==
Players control a dark lord-type character who attempts galactic domination. The tyrant's conquest is opposed by the Galactic Senate, a benevolent space empire that attempts to topple the player's totalitarian regime. Players are given missions that, upon completion, weaken the Galactic Senate. Conquering inhabited planets allows players to enslave the populace. Players are also given strategic choices that play out like a digital collectible card game and can unlock special abilities.

== Development ==
After leaving the video game industry, Jason Kapalka founded a new studio, Blue Wizard Digital. Space Tyrant was their first game. The game left early access in February 2018.

== Reception ==
In his review for Eurogamer, Christian Donland wrote that the game's streamlined gameplay may frustrate purists, but it "still offers some of the riches and sprawl of 4X". Alec Meer reviewed the game during early access for Rock Paper Shotgun. Meer called it "really good" and praised the streamlined gameplay, though he criticized the game's humor. Tom Chick, who reviewed the game for his blog Quarter to Three, wrote of the game's pacing, "This is a game with the same stuff as its far more detailed and complicated cousins, but it knows how to move." Craig Robinson of Strategy Gamer wrote, "For those wanting a light-hearted experience filled with great content and progression, this cheap little title will offer you exactly that."
