= Eador: Masters of the Broken World =

2013 video game

- Developer: Snowbird Game Studios
- Publisher: Snowbird Game Studios
- Platform: Microsoft Windows
- Release: NA: 2013
- Genre: Strategy
- Modes: Single-player, multiplayer

Eador: Masters of the Broken World is a strategy video game made by Russian company Snowbird Game Studios. It was released in 2013 and is a remake of an older game, Eador: Genesis.

== Gameplay ==
Eador: Masters of the Broken World mixes gameplay elements of 4X games, role-playing video games, and turn-based tactics. Players take the role of a demigod who seeks to unite a world broken into different shards. Each shard is a different map that must be conquered. On each map, players select a hero to lead their army, build up an empire, and recruit fantasy creatures to be in their army. Battles between armies are tactical and turn-based, as in the Heroes of Might & Magic games.

== Development ==
Eador: Masters of the Broken World is a remake of Eador: Genesis, which was published in 2009. Eador: Imperium, a standalone expansion, entered early access in 2016.

== Reception ==
The game received mixed reviews on Metacritic. On release, some publications criticized the game's bugs. Hardcore Gamer called it "not worth the headache", and GameSpot said, "Any enjoyment derived from Eador: Masters of the Broken World is buried beneath a landslide of inexcusable technical issues." While acknowledging the game's bugs and "often-disastrous implementation", Game Informer wrote that it is "worth your time" and has excellent design. In recommending the game, Rock Paper Shotgun said the game initially seems a bit stereotypical of turn-based fantasy games, but gameplay becomes much deeper as time goes on. PCGamesN's reviewer found the game's difficulty frustrating but said that the game's difficulty and poor user interface made it sweeter when winning. In 2018, PC Gamer included it in a list of best 4X games, recommending it to players looking for a different experience than typical 4X games.
