= Heroes of Land, Air & Sea =

2018 board game

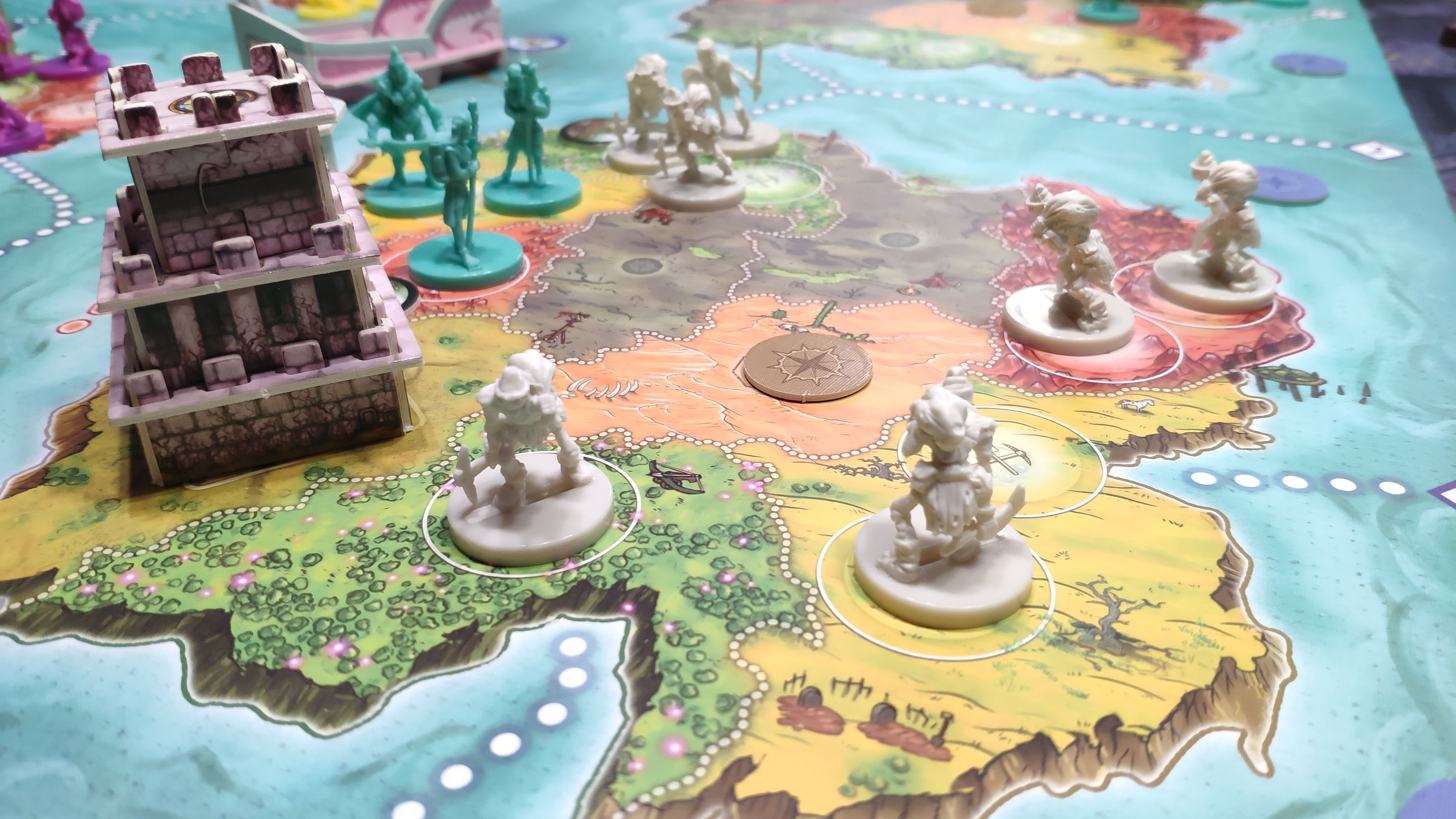
Undead army under attack by elves

Heroes of Land, Air & Sea is a 2018 fantasy-themed 4X area control board game published by Gamelyn Games and designed by Scott Almes.
