= Armada 2525 =

1991 video game

- Developer: Robert T. Smith
- Publisher: Interstel Corporation
- Producer: Van Collins
- Artists: Robert T. Smith, Michael S. Seek
- Composers: Matt Lecuru, Sound Images UK
- Platform: MS-DOS
- Release: NA: 1991
- Genre: 4X
- Modes: Single-player, multiplayer

Armada 2525 is a 4X science fiction computer strategy game developed by Robert T. Smith and published by Interstel Corporation. It was released in North America in 1991 for $49.95. An updated version called Armada 2525 Deluxe was also released the following year which featured updated gameplay, graphics and improved multiplayer.

== Gameplay ==
Armada 2525 is a 4X (an abbreviation of explore, expand, exploit, and exterminate) strategy game. Players must explore the galaxy, expand their empire, exploit the various resources to be found, and exterminate their rivals. Gameplay ends depending one of 4 victory conditions set at the start of a gaming session.

The game takes place entirely in 2D with the main star map and battle sequences taking place on 2D planes. It is broken up into a single production phase for construction and research followed by 4 movement phases where the player can explore the galaxy and fight opposing empires. Combat occurs when a fleet arrives at a star with an opposing player with both sides able to issue limited commands before the start of automated combat. The actual combat scenario is determined whether there is an opposing fleet guarding the star or lacking that, if there are opposing planetary defenses.

== Reception and legacy ==
Computer Gaming World praised Armada 2525 for its simplicity, diversity, and ease of play, stating the game allowed players to focus on playing well versus understanding how to play. The game's AI was also touted as challenging enough for solo play. The magazine did however criticize the game's multiplayer feature as the save-mechanism was not conducive to play-by-email and the lack of modem support meant the only option was hotseat play. While it did call the game the closest in spirit to Reach for the Stars than any other space strategy game to date, the magazine also stated it was not the end-all substitute for it. It concluded that Armada 2525 was a worthy addition to the strategic space genre for its fans. A 1994 survey of strategic space games set in the year 2000 and later gave the game three stars out of five, stating that it was "Both multi-layered and detailed".

Armada 2526 is touted as the successor of Armada 2525.
