= Pax Nova =

2020 video game

- Developer: GreyWolf Entertainment
- Publisher: Iceberg Interactive
- Platform: Microsoft Windows
- Release: April 28, 2020
- Genres: Turn-based strategy, 4X
- Modes: Single-player, multiplayer

Pax Nova is a 4X turn-based strategy game developed by Portuguese studio GreyWolf Entertainment and published by Iceberg Interactive. It was released for Microsoft Windows on April 28, 2020.

== Gameplay ==
Players can either choose one of already existing factions; each consisting of diverse attributes, or create a faction of their own to establish themselves in Eos. In the game, players explore new worlds and new star systems filled with uncoverable secrets followed by numerous dangerous aspects. Players also build cities and make key decisions; such as expanding influence through diplomacy or declaring war and prepare for battle on either land or in space, all depending on individual play-styles.

Pax Nova is a 4X game, and incorporates a turn-based system.

== Development ==
Pax Nova was developed by GreyWolf Entertainment under Mike Domingues. The game was announced on October 15, 2018 for PC. The game was released in Steam's Early Access in late 2019 and then fully released in April 2020.

== Reception ==
A review from TechRaptor praised the 4X gameplay and the unit customization mechanic. However, criticism was directed towards the game's graphics, diplomacy mechanic, sound design, and other technical problems.
