= Horizon (2014 video game) =

- Developer: L3O Interactive
- Publisher: Iceberg Interactive
- Designer: Raffi Parsekhian
- Platform: Microsoft Windows
- Release: NA: February 2014
- Genre: 4X
- Mode: Single-player

Horizon is a 4X video game developed by Canadian studio L3O Interactive and published by Iceberg Interactive in 2014.

== Gameplay ==
The Varaians, an ancient spacefaring race, creates life in Horizon's galaxy. When their first creation rebels against them, the Varaians attempt to destroy them. In a campaign mode, players can gain favor with either of these races by performing tasks, eventually allying with their chosen faction against the other race. In a more sandbox-oriented mode, players have the option of performing random missions to learn about the history of the other empires. The game is turn-based and follows classic 4X gameplay: players establish an empire, expand by colonizing other planets, research new technologies, and work toward achieving victory through means such as war or diplomacy. The player's empire can be customized using a point system in which powerful traits cost many points. Combat is resolved in a tactical battle where players control all their ships, which can involve large fleets spread through multiple star systems. Diplomacy does not allow direct trades; instead, players must offer a gift, then request a reciprocal gift, which can be denied.

== Development ==
Game designer Raffi Parsekhian was inspired by Master of Orion and the space opera TV show Babylon 5. Parsekhian engaged in full-time development of Horizon from 2001 to 2006, when it reached a playable alpha state. He continued part-time development through at least 2010. After leaving his IT job in 2011, he began full-time development with a small team, describing previous attempts to make the game as prototypes. It entered early access in 2013 and was released in February 2014.

== Reception ==
Horizon received mixed reviews on Metacritic. In his review for IGN, Rowan Kaiser praised some elements of the game, such as how it handles research and giving "lived-in" backstories to the various empires. However, he said it stumbles too badly in very basic areas, such as the tactical combat and diplomacy, which Kaiser found unplayable. Daniel Starkey of GameSpot wrote, "Horizon doesn't possess the finesse to handle all it's trying to do, though it does make a valiant effort." Richard Cobbett of PC Gamer called it "half a great 4X game, dragged screaming into the nearest black hole by its lesser components".
