= Starships Unlimited =

- Developer(s): ApeZone
- Publisher(s): Matrix Games
- Platform(s): Microsoft Windows
- Release: May 23, 2001
- Genre(s): 4X Real-Time Strategy
- Mode(s): Single-player

Starships Unlimited is a 4X real-time strategy game series. Unlike other 4X games, Starships Unlimited puts greater emphasis on starships than on colonies. The series was developed by Andrew Ewanchyna of ApeZone. The game allows players to take control of a civilization and compete against other civilizations in the galaxy.

The series consists of three main versions: Starships Unlimited (1.x), Starships Unlimited: Divided Galaxies (2.x), and Starships Unlimited v3.5 (3.0x). The first game, released in late 1999, was met with little praise but garnered a cult following. The second game, Starships Unlimited: Divided Galaxies, was published by Matrix Games and released on November 1, 2002. It featured improved graphics and gameplay mechanics. In this game, players use combat, diplomacy, intelligence, and trade to be the leader of their race, while dealing with events & other AI players. The main tools of the players are the starships they design, build, upgrade, and command.

Starships Unlimited v3.5 is the latest version of the game series. It was released on November 9, 2005 and features further improvements over its predecessor. The game includes various subtle changes to gameplay while also being more polished, with more balancing, graphical updates, as well as a new soundtrack.

Reception of the series has been generally positive, with critics praising the depth and complexity of the gameplay mechanics. The series has a dedicated fan base and has been praised for its replayability.

The following can be found on the website, describing the game:

- An unlimited number of galaxies to play in, from spiral to ring galaxies.
- Over 100 technologies are to be discovered and put to use, from different weapons to starship designs.
- Four ages of technology to discover.
- Fight amazing battles with starships over alien worlds.
- Take control of starship maneuvers or let the computer do it for you.
- Fire your weapons manually or let the computer handle them.
- Launch fighters and torpedoes against enemy fleets.
- Reach higher technology levels such as starship cloaking devices.
- Explore the galaxy and locate ancient alien technology.
- Play against up to 7 artificial players of varying skill levels.
- Live the adventure of a great space sci-fi classic.
- Endless replay, with different galaxies and alien races.
