= C-evo =

1999 video game

- Developer: Steffen Gerlach
- Release: 0.0/0.1 / 21 May 1999; 27 years ago 1.0 / 21 May 2006; 20 years ago
- Stable release: 1.3.6 / 16 September 2024; 2 years ago
- Written in: Lazarus
- Platform: Windows 95 or newer
- Type: Single or hotseat play 4X turn-based strategy
- License: Public domain software
- Website: www.c-evo.org
- Repository: www.c-evo.org/files/download.php?cevosrc.cevosrc.zip

C-evo is a free turn-based strategy computer game whose source code is in the public domain by German programmer and designer Steffen Gerlach. It was written in Delphi and later ported to Lazarus instead.

C-evo is an empire building game based on Civilization II, but with a different focus; it aims to be a pure "game" with all players playing to win, rather than the more simulationist side of the Civilization series. As a result, it is known for tough and uncompromising artificial intelligence computer opponents; some of these AIs have been contributed by the player base and are separately downloadable.

== Gameplay ==
C-evo is an empire building game, dealing with the history of humans from antiquity into the future. This includes aspects of exploration and expansion, war and diplomacy, cultivation and pollution, industry and agriculture, research and administration. Players must constantly make decisions such as whether and where to build cities, roads, irrigation, fortresses, and whether to form an alliance with a neighboring country or risk attacking it, and whether to devote scarce resources to research, production, warfare, or the morale of the populace. A successful player manages to find a balance among these choices.

The game starts with the development of primitive technologies such as the wheel, and ends when the first player has successfully constructed an spaceship going to outer space. As the game progresses, the player finds that the building of factories, for example, leads to increased pollution, which must be cleared up and can be stopped through development of cleaner technologies.

The setup allows the player to either choose a map or supply size and ocean-to-land ratio to have one generated randomly, and to choose how many (1 to 15) tribes – also called nations – will populate it when the game starts, as well as which intelligence will control each tribe during the game – that is, either a human player or any artificial intelligence such as Gerlach's default AI that is included with the game; alternative AIs have been designed and contributed by other programmers. A supervisor mode allows games where all tribes are controlled by artificial intelligence. Games with more than one human player can be played in hotseat mode.

== Design and resources ==
On the C-evo webpage, the game, its source code, AI modules, graphics, and player contributions such as many additional nations, maps, mods, and utilities are available.

The documentation of the AI's DLL-interface is available from the project homepage. There is also an AI development kit, available in C# since version 1.1.2, in Delphi, and in C++. The C# kit is included with the game, as is a map editor.

== Reception ==
At the 2005 International Joint Conference on Artificial Intelligence, Rubén Sánchez-Pelegrín and Belén Díaz-Agudo presented a paper entitled "An Intelligent Decision Module based on CBR for C-evo", which discusses using C-evo as a platform to perform artificial intelligence research. This research continued with more findings in a second paper, A CBR Module for a Strategy Videogame.

== See also ==
- List of open source games
