= FreeCol =

2003 open source simulation game

- Challenge the New World...

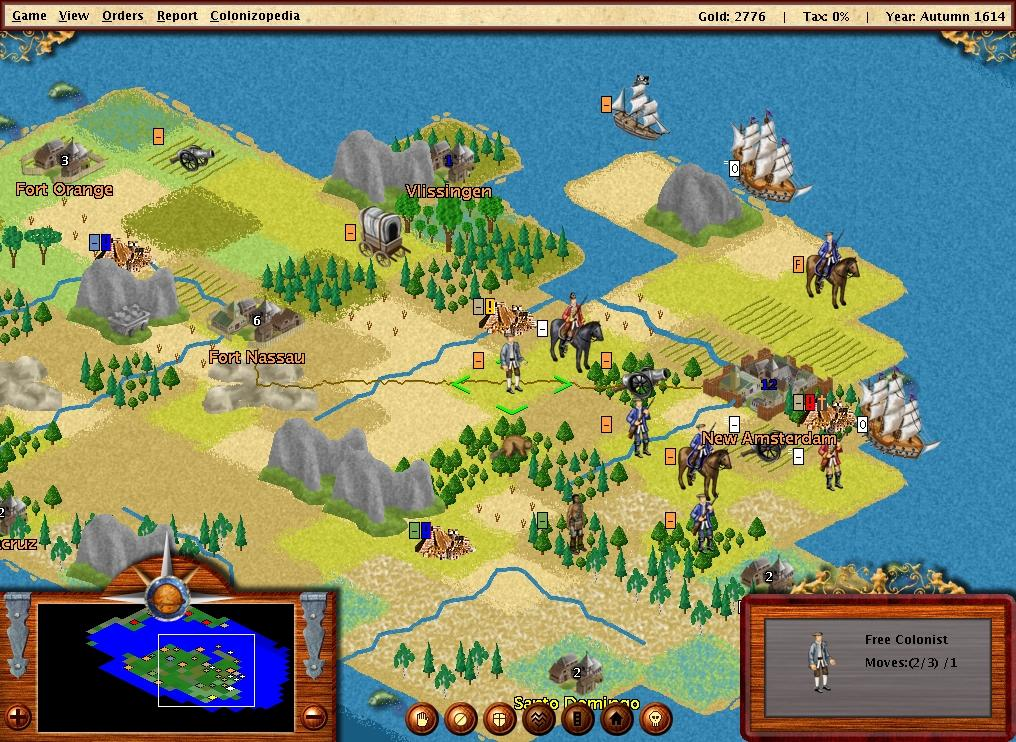
- Screenshot from FreeCol 0.5.2
- Original author: The Freecol Team
- Developer: SourceForge project FreeCol
- Release: January 2, 2003; 23 years ago
- Stable release: 1.2.0 / July 4, 2024; 2 years ago
- Written in: Java
- Platform: Java platform 11 or later, display 1024×768 or more
- Available in: 54 languages (translatewiki.net)
- List of languages af ang ar arz be bg br bs ca cs-CZ da de el en-GB eo es et eu fa fi fr gl grc he hsb hu ia id it-IT ja km ko lt mk ms nb nds nl nl-BE nn oc pl-PL pms pt-BR pt-PT qqq ru sq sv ta tl tr uk zh-CN
- Type: Turn-based strategy video game
- License: GPL-2.0-or-later
- Website: www.freecol.org
- Repository: github.com/FreeCol/freecol

FreeCol is a 4X video game, a clone of Sid Meier's Colonization. FreeCol is free and open source software released under the GNU GPL-2.0-or-later. In 2023, the FreeCol project reached its 1.0 release, after twenty years of development.

FreeCol is mostly programmed in Java and should thus be platform-independent. In practice, it is known to run on Linux and Windows, as well as Mac OS X (with some limitations).

While remaining faithful to the original in terms of mechanics and gameplay, FreeCol features redesigned graphics. Moreover, in addition to the classical Colonization rules, it features an additional ruleset that incorporates ideas that didn't make it to the final version of Meier's game, requests by fans and original concepts like new European players with new national bonuses.

== Gameplay ==
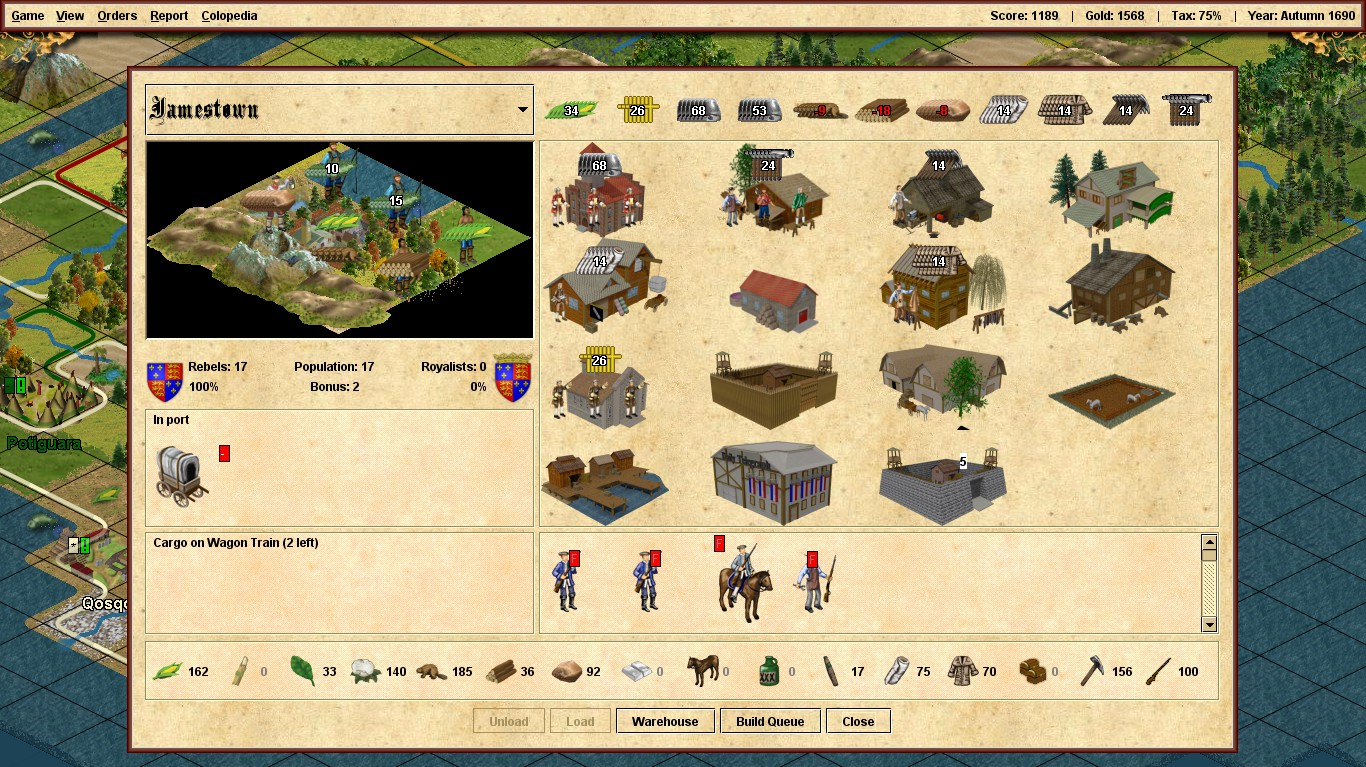
Screenshot of the unit selection screen

In FreeCol the player leads the colony of a European power from the arrival on the shore of the New World into the future, achieving victory by one of two possible victory conditions: either gaining independence by declaring independence and subsequently defeating the dispatched royal expeditionary force or by defeating the colonies of all the competing European powers by the year 1600. To be allowed to declare independence, at least 50% of the player's colonists must support independence. This is achieved by producing liberty bells; 200 liberty bells turn one colonist from being a royalist into being a rebel. To be able to defeat the royal expeditionary force the player must train and build a strong enough army of their own.

Another important factor are the numerous settlements of different Native American nations. Native settlements can be traded with to gain gold or they can be conquered for treasure. Native settlements can also teach the player's colonists and turn them into specialist. Specialists are considerably more productive when assigned in their trade. Most specialists can be trained for gold in Europe or come as settlers for free, but certain specialists can only be trained at certain native settlements, you can also train new specialists if you already have a specialist.

FreeCol starts in 1492 with two colonists on a caravel on the ocean at the player's disposal. The player is the king's proxy and is supposed to lead the caravel to the shore and found a colony in the New World consisting of multiple settlements. The player gets additional colonists by producing food (200 food units in a settlement generates a new unit), by immigration from Europe, by converting the natives or by capturing unarmed units of competing European colonies.

The player may trade with Europe using various natural resources which are produced in settlements or acquired from trade with natives. In each settlement the player can also build up industrial buildings to convert raw materials into processed goods, which sell for more in Europe, providing a significant economic advance.

== Reception ==
In February 2007 FreeCol was SourceForge's Project of the Month. In 2008, Rock, Paper, Shotgun's game journalist, Alec Meer, had mixed feelings about FreeCol but still called it: "it's an (sic) remarkable accomplishment, and I'm very glad it's out there." and "FreeCol, though, is here right now, it's free, it's stable, it's pretty much feature-complete and unlike its parent it has multiplayer". In 2010 Alec Meer named FreeCol in Rock, Paper, Shotgun as a better alternative when he was confronted with the later commercial remake Civilization IV: Colonization.

As of April 2026, FreeCol has been downloaded over 2,200,000 times on SourceForge.

== See also ==
- List of open source games
