= Armada 2526 =

2009 video game

- Developer: Ntronium Games
- Publishers: Tri Synergy; Iceberg Interactive
- Platforms: Microsoft Windows; Cloud (OnLive)
- Release: NA: Nov 17, 2009
- Genre: 4X
- Modes: Single-player, multiplayer

Armada 2526 is a 4X science fiction computer strategy game developed by British studio Ntronium Games, released in North America on November 17, 2009. Armada 2526 is an example of the space opera genre, and is the spiritual successor of the game Armada 2525, which was released by Interstel in 1991. Armada 2526 puts players in charge of a fledgling galactic empire, and they must attempt to explore the galaxy and expand their territory, while trying to destroy rival empires. The gameplay is a hybrid of turn-based and real-time time-keeping systems, and players can use military, diplomatic, economic and technological means to further their empires. The game received mixed reviews from critics.

Ntronium also released an expansion pack for the game, titled Armada 2526: Supernova, which enabled online multiplayer play. Supernova includes two new alien races, new hazards, an updated trade mechanic, and more researchable technologies.

== Gameplay ==
A squad of Dreadnought ships covers a landing zone

The fundamental gameplay mechanic of Armada 2526 is 4X, an abbreviation of explore, expand, exploit, and exterminate. Players must explore the galaxy, expand their empire, exploit the various resources to be found, and exterminate their rivals. The game uses elements of both turn-based and real-time time-keeping systems, there are no set battles, and there are multiple paths that players can take to victory. Games last for an arbitrary amount of time, set at the beginning of the game; the galactic civilization with the most points at the end of the game is the winner. The conditions for victory vary depending on the race that players choose to play as. Some races focus on the happiness of their citizens, others focus on developing technology, and yet others focus on population. There are four different game scenarios that players can choose from, each with a different size of randomly generated game map. These game maps can contain anywhere from two to seventeen civilizations.

Most of Armada 2526 takes place in 2D, with the main star map and battle sequences taking place on 2D planes. However, it is also possible to view the battles from a 3D perspective. Exploration is carried out on the main star map, and players can use an Ark Ship to travel to new worlds and colonize them. As well as colonization, players can expand their empires by contacting alien colonies, by making alliances with other empires, through building, and by military means. The spaceships that the player can use in battle include small scout ships, medium-sized corvettes, destroyers, and large dreadnoughts and carriers.

Players are responsible for the economic upkeep of their colonies, and they can set the tax and migration policies for them. The population of colonies is also a concern for the player, and it is possible to supplement a colony's population by transporting more people from other worlds. These processes can also be automated. Diplomacy in Armada 2526 includes the ability to form offensive and defensive alliances; to trade in money, ships, colonies, technology, and information; and to threaten, give ultimatums or ask for favors. There are also some unusual technologies that players can research in the game. In addition to items such as spaceships, weapons, and shields, players can develop such technologies as bio-engineered squid hyperdrive ships, and psychic civilians that can detect enemy warships in space above their planets.

== Reception ==
Armada 2526 received mixed reviews from critics, resulting in an accumulative average score of 66 out of 100 according to review aggregator Metacritic. Game Zone's Mike Splechta praised the game's accessibility and replay value, but criticised its graphics as "just not up to today's standards". Simon Priest's review in Strategy Informer was positive overall, but he criticized the game's user interface, calling it "the weak link in the chain". James Allen of Out of Eight, on the other hand, praised the "informative" user interface, as well as the size of the randomized maps, the computer control of colonies, the AI opponents, and the diversity of the victory conditions. However, he criticized the lack of online multiplayer play in the original version, and called the combat "bland", the diplomacy "generic", and said that Armada "lacks the 'hook' of more robust offerings". Adam Solo's review in Space Strategy Games Sector called Armada 2526 "a very solid game", but said that "it may not be for everybody", noting that this is in line with Ntronium's target of hardcore strategy fans. He also praised the developers for their continuous improvement of the game.
