= Empire: Wargame of the Century =

1987 video game

- Developers: Walter Bright; Mark Baldwin
- Publisher: Interstel Corporation
- Platforms: Amiga, Apple II, Atari ST, Commodore 64, MS-DOS, Mac
- Release: 1987

Empire: Wargame of the Century is a video game based on Empire developed by Walter Bright and published by Interstel Corporation in 1987.

== Description ==
Empire: Wargame of the Century is part of Interstel's Star Fleet franchise, in which Krellans are enemies. While the franchise depicts interstellar war, the game's documentation describes a backstory in which the player opposes a Krellan strategy to use as few resources as possible to conquer planets. Both sides thus use World War II-era weapons such as submarines, aircraft, and armies.

== Development ==
Walter Bright in 1977 wrote Empire, a strategy wargame, for the PDP-10 mainframe at Caltech. In 1983 he ported the game to PDP-11 assembly language and announced it in BYTE, but sold only two copies. After learning the C programming language ("it might as well have been called EIL, for 'Empire Implementation Language'"), Bright ported Empire to the IBM PC. With low commercial expectations, he again announced it in BYTE and received many orders.

Bright licensed the game to Epyx. After seeing a public domain version of the game distributed by DECUS, Trevor Sorenson of Interstel approached Bright in 1985 and took over the license in 1986. Mark Baldwin coauthored the Interstel version, Empire: Wargame of the Century, which adds escorts, patrols, faster destroyers, and cruisers and battleship bombardment. Versions appeared for Amiga, Atari ST, MS-DOS, Commodore 64, Apple II, and Mac.

Interstel warned customers "Don't buy Empire! It is a Krellan plot to reduce productivity", and the manual notes "Interstel assumes no responsibility for lost productivity on the part of the players". The mainframe Empire had caused video game addiction at Caltech, as students failed classes while playing the game.

== Reception ==
Creative Computing in 1984 said that Bright's Empire for the IBM PC's "simple, yet elegant design offers challenging military campaigns". While criticizing the "complex command structure" and poor documentation the magazine praised its "nail-biting excitement", concluding that for military strategists, "Empire proves the glory that was the mainframe's continues on the microcomputer".

Computer Gaming World stated that Empire: Wargame of the Century was "a fascinating grand strategic wargame, more sophisticated than Risk, but easier to play than Third Reich". William Kritzen's full review in the magazine noted the improved UI over the DECUS version, saying "the playability of an already successful system has been significantly enhanced". He concluded, "buy this game!" The game received the magazine's "Game of the Year" award for 1988; in 1989 the magazine named Empire to its Hall of Fame for games readers rated highly over time, with a final score of 9.71 out of 12; in 1990 readers voted for the game as their "All-Time Favorite"; a 1991 magazine survey of strategy and war games gave it four and a half stars out of five; and a 1993 survey in the magazine gave the game three stars out of five.

"I never played Empire" on mainframe, said Neil Randall of Compute!, "and I'm glad I didn't know it existed", agreeing with the warning on the game box of its addictiveness ("I had enough trouble just writing this review"). Praising the Atari ST version's UI, he said that the "superb" game combined aspects of exploration and strategy. Kritzen mused that Interplay's improvements made the game "too user friendly", because he found it difficult to stop playing to write the review. While wishing for improved pathfinding, Antic's Steve Panak said that the ST version was "so good and so addictive that I find myself starting a game in the late afternoon, and the next time I look at my watch it's 2 a.m." Rating the Amiga version with 4+ stars, Info's reviewer stated that "Empire is the most entertaining 'world conquest' game" he had played, and called it "extremely addictive". The magazine also rated the Commodore 64 version 4+ stars citing "the game's [historical] significance and absorbing playability", but wished for clearer graphics. Info concluded that "Empire is showing its age, but it's still a must-have for wargamers everywhere". While stating that the UI could be better, Jerry Pournelle of BYTE noted that Empire avoided the need to micromanage units that made games like Anacreon: Reconstruction 4021 tedious. Ease of play, fast and simple combat, and intuitive UI made the game addictive, he said, tempting players to find out what would happen next.

ACE rated the Amiga and ST versions 618 and 606 out of 1000, respectively, citing the non-sophisticated graphics and sound. The magazine stated that "the gameplay's good and it's fun to play" but quickly repetitive, concluding that "you'll soon find that one war's much like another". Noting that games require many hours, Ahoy!'s AmigaUser concluded that "for those who relish total immersion in a stimulating strategic environment ... this fascinating wargame is a perfect choice". The ST version of the game was reviewed in 1988 in Dragon #131 by Hartley, Patricia, and Kirk Lesser in "The Role of Computers" column. The reviewers gave the game 4 out of 5 stars. The Lessers reviewed the MS-DOS version of the game in 1989 in Dragon #142, and gave the game 4 out of 5 stars.
