= Andromeda Conquest =

1982 video game

- Developer: Avalon Hill
- Publisher: Avalon Hill
- Platforms: Apple II, Atari 8-bit, Commodore 64, Commodore PET, MS-DOS, TRS-80
- Release: NA: 1982
- Genre: Strategy
- Mode: Single-player

Andromeda Conquest is a strategy video game released for the Apple II, Atari 8-bit computers, Commodore PET, MS-DOS, and TRS-80 in 1982. It influenced the 4X game genre.

== Reception ==
Brian J. Murphy of Creative Computing praised Andromeda Conquest for its playability and multi-player mode but criticized the solitaire game, describing it as "dull". Computer Gaming World's Floyd Mathews praised the game as "relatively simple, but exciting". However, in 1992, in its retrospective survey of science fiction games, the magazine gave the title two of five stars.
