= Malkari =

- village
- Location within Madhya Pradesh Location within India
- Coordinates: 23.766336°N 77.412225°E
- Country: India
- State: Madhya Pradesh
- District: Bhopal
- Tehsil: Berasia

Population (2011)
  - Total: 495
- Time zone: UTC+5:30 (IST)
- ISO 3166 code: MP-IN
- Census code: 482137

Malkari is a village in the Bhopal district of Madhya Pradesh, India. It is located in the Berasia tehsil.

== Demographics ==
According to the 2011 census of India, Malkari has 104 households. The effective literacy rate (i.e. the literacy rate of the population excluding children aged 6 and below) is 54.05%.

Demographics (2011 Census)
	Total	Male	Female
Population	495	245	250
Children aged below 6 years	112	54	58
Scheduled caste	0	0	0
Scheduled tribe	0	0	0
Literates	207	109	98
Workers (all)	243	124	119
Main workers (total)	242	123	119
Main workers: Cultivators	45	22	23
Main workers: Agricultural labourers	194	101	93
Main workers: Household industry workers	0	0	0
Main workers: Other	3	0	3
Marginal workers (total)	1	1	0
Marginal workers: Cultivators	0	0	0
Marginal workers: Agricultural labourers	0	0	0
Marginal workers: Household industry workers	0	0	0
Marginal workers: Others	1	1	0
Non-workers	252	121	131
