= Shattered Suns =

2008 video game

- Developer(s): Clear Crown
- Publisher(s): Clear Crown
- Platform(s): Microsoft Windows
- Release: August 19, 2008
- Genre(s): Real-time strategy

Shattered Suns is a Real-time strategy game set in space. It focuses on unique 3D combat with sophisticated gameplay mechanics. The game was released on August 19, 2008.

== Reception ==
Reception

Aggregate score
Aggregator	Score
Metacritic	41/100

Review scores
Publication	Score
GameSpot	4/10
IGN	4.3/10
PC Gamer (US)	38%

The game received "generally unfavorable reviews" according to the review aggregation website Metacritic.
