= Stellar Conquest =

1974 science fiction board game

The classic game of societies in conflict
- 1974 cover
- Designers: Howard M. Thompson
- Publishers: 1974 Metagaming Concepts; 1984 Avalon Hill
- Publication: 1974; 52 years ago
- Genres: Science fiction, board game
- Age range: 10+

Stellar Conquest is a science fiction board game published by Metagaming Concepts in 1974.

== Description ==
Stellar Conquest is a science fiction board game for 2–4 players that is a prototype of the 4X strategy game genre.

The game features various interstellar ship types that are used to transfer populations around the game's universe, populate planets, and ultimately defeat opponents by slowly improving technology, movement, and offensive capabilities.

=== The board ===
The board is a hex grid map containing stars of varying colors. Stars may have planets that are suitable for colonization. Blue stars can feature stellar nurseries or areas undergoing accretion, which impedes movement through those hexes.

== Basic rules ==
Each player starts in an opposite corner of the board, each with a number of markers that represent ships of various types. For the first four turns the corner square counts as a populated planet. In addition, all ships may move only two spaces, but it is possible to purchase movement upgrades that improve the rate of travel speed.

Units must follow the quickest path to a named destination, and their destination can be changed only when the route causes the unit to stop on a star hex. The distance that ships of any type may travel may not exceed more than eight hexes away from a populated planet that is owned by the same player; this limitation can be rescinded by research.

Research points must be spent on military units (ships that can attack other ships) before they can be built. A player's non-military unit unaccompanied by a military unit landing in a star which that player has not yet explored must roll a die, and is destroyed on a roll of 1.

When a player's piece lands on a star, the star's ability to sustain life is randomly determined, the chance of success is dependent on the color of the star. Upgrades may improve a planet's ability to sustain life.

Every four turns a "production phase" occurs in which planetary populations increase by one-fifth their current population number. Any player may move population units into CTs, and earn Industrial Unit Output (IUO), the currency with which players purchase upgrades and extra ships.

The number of ships a player begins with depends upon the number of players, the scenario, and the preferences of the players.

== Alternate building options ==
In addition to offensive spacecraft used off-world, players can opt to build stationary Missile Bases (MBs) and Advanced Missile Bases (AMBs). Essentially acting in the same manner as a grounded starship (that is, with particular combat statistics) it is immobile and remains on the planet it was built on. Since Missile Bases are inexpensive compared to the equivalent starship, they may provide an economical way to defend a player's planets.

== Publication history ==
Howard M. Thompson designed Stellar Conquest and shopped it to Avalon Hill in 1973. When Avalon Hill turned it down, Thompson formed his own company in 1974, Metagaming Concepts, in order to market the game packaged in a ziplock bag. In 1979, Metagaming re-released the game as a boxed set.

In a 1976 poll conducted by Simulations Publications Inc. to determine the most popular board wargames in North America, Stellar Conquest placed 93 out of 202 games.

After the demise of Metagaming Concepts, Stellar Conquest was republished by Avalon Hill in 1984.

== Reception ==
Writing for Moves, game designer Richard Berg called it "far and away the best sci-fi game on the market. The basic game is simple, yet effective, and the advanced game and optional rules are quite intelligent and intriguing."

In Issue 6 of The Space Gamer, Kelly Moorman wrote two reviews. In the first, Moorman commented, "in the interests of fair play, I think I should point out that in a basic game of Stellar Conquest, Player #3 has a distinct advantage over the other players regarding the amount of intelligence he can accumulate and utilize in making the decision about where to place his first colony -- which is one of the most vital decisions in the game for any player, no matter what his position." In the second review, Moorman noted "One obvious fault in the rules and play of Stellar Conquest is the fact that all of the other players can 'see' the other player's units, even though they don't know the types or numbers of the units. Of course, the entire form of play must be changed, and actually should be, in order to achieve maximum realism in playing SC." Almost a decade later, in Issue 76, Tony Watson commented "In summation, with some very minor changes in terms of play, the new edition of SC brings back a true classic in the field of sf boardgames. [...] Even after a decade, this remains a superb game, a must for every space gamer's shelf."

In Issue 29 of the British wargaming magazine Perfidious Albion, David Horton called this "a fairly conventional game of interstellar exploration, exploitation and conflict ... if you are interested in a technologically complex game of tactical combat then this game offers little. All factors are severely abstracted from reality ... but this leaves simple, clean mechanics which very quickly leave the player free to concentrate on the strategic options whose choice provides the main fascination of the game." Horton concluded, "This is definitely a game for the devious person."

In the inaugural issue of Ares Magazine (March 1980), David Ritchie called it "The classic game of inter-stellar system warfare. [...] After five years and three printings, the game remains almost as fresh and exciting as the day it was published. Somewhat complex and long, but can be completed in an afternoon." Ritchie concluded by giving the game a rating of 7 out of 9.

John Lambshead in White Dwarf #22 (December 1980 – January 1981) gave it a 9, and said "This is undoubtedly the best game of its kind that I have ever played".

== Awards ==
At the 1976 Origins Awards, Stellar Conquest was a finalist for the Charles S. Roberts Award in the category "Best Amateur Game of 1975".

== Impact ==
The game is credited with influence on early computer 4X games such as Reach for the Stars, Anacreon, Stellar Crusade, and Master of Orion. There is also the 1994 shareware game Stellar Conquest III: Hostile Takeover which became open source Freeware in 2006.
