= Star Fleet (video game series) =

Tactical combat video game series

The Star Fleet computer games are starship tactical combat simulations originally created by Dr. Trevor Sorensen in the late 1970s.

== Star Fleet I: The War Begins! ==
Star Fleet I has a plot and gameplay inspired by the Star Trek games of the late 1960s. Star Fleet I allows the player to command a United Galactic Alliance spaceship and undertake various missions to defend Earth from the Krellan and Zaldron alien invaders.

The version of the game described at Home of the Underdogs is the first official release version by Interstel, after it was incorporated by Trevor Sorensen in 1986. It was at this time that Interstel became an affiliated label of Electronic Arts. The game itself, however, began selling in 1983 by Cygnus, back when it was still a "garage sale" operation. Before being picked up by Electronic Arts, approximately 5,000 games were sold. Over 80,000 games were sold after Star Fleet I was distributed by Electronic Arts.

== Empire: Wargame of the Century ==
Released after Star Fleet I and before Star Fleet II in 1987 and 1988 by Interstel in the Star Fleet series as "A Star Fleet Planetary Campaign", Empire: Wargame of the Century was developed by Walter Bright who invented the game in the 1970s and Mark Baldwin who later went on to publish a series of sequels Empire Deluxe and Empire II (neither of which were included in the Star Fleet series). The game centered on an alternative method of planetary conquest later featured in Star Fleet II (and planned for Star Fleet III) named "Operation Big Brother". The players control the general of a Star Fleet Special Planetary Task Force, and, starting by controlling a single city the players have to produce armies, fighter planes and various transport and war ships, with the aim of controlling the entire planet by conquest of all its cities, and destruction of player's opponent (or opponents, as the game supported up to 3 human or computer controlled sides), who in turn attempts the same. Empire: Wargame of the Century was named Computer Game of the Year for 1988 by Computer Gaming World magazine. Over 100,000 games were sold by Interstel and distributed through Electronic Arts.

== Star Fleet II: Krellan Commander ==
This sequel to Star Fleet I was published in 1989 by Interstel Corporation, but was only in production for a few months due to internal problems at Interstel. The game was much more complex and sophisticated than Star Fleet I. It involved many different ships types, including battlecruisers, destroyers, heavy and light cruisers, frigates, troop transports, freighters, scouts, and starliners. Fleet operations were possible and the universe included hundreds of planets to utilize or conquer. It was only released for DOS.

== Star Legions ==
This game, published by Mindcraft, another affiliated label of Electronic Arts, was released in late 1992. Star Legions was based on the planetary assault module of Star Fleet II. This allowed for more detail control of ground troops landing on the planet.

== Star Fleet III onwards ==
Star Fleet III, a sequel to Star Fleet II developed by Supernova Creations was planned to be published by Mindcraft in 1993. It was never finished or released. It should not be confused with Star Legions; as Dr. Sorensen explains:

Star Legions was never intended as Star Fleet 3. [It] was a spin-off of Star Fleet 2 and was to provide an interim product until SF3 could be completed.

Dr. Sorensen had designed outlines for games in the Star Fleet series up to Star Fleet VII.

== Star Fleet Deluxe ==
Star Fleet Deluxe was an attempt to create a new modern version of the classic Star Fleet I: The War Begins!, by game creator Dr. Trevor Sorensen. This would have been interactive online version of the game between players.

On his website, Star Fleet Central, he allowed free downloads of both Star Fleet I and II, with necessary patches.

Development of the game stalled as the programmer who was helping with development of the new Star Fleet Deluxe took his own life. Shortly after this, the website closed down. It was opened again on the Symbiotic Software website in 2008, which itself closed three years later.

== Star Fleet Deluxe For Android ==
In March 2011, Dr. Sorensen was contacted by Kevin Fightmaster about an opportunity to port the original Star Fleet I game over to the Android platform. It was decided that the Star Fleet Deluxe version of the game would be made as an Android port. With some redesign on the UI to incorporate the touch nature and smaller display of the mobile platform, the game was initially completed in the fall of 2013. After almost a year of testing and patching, the game was ready for launch on August 1, 2014. The game included new features such as career statistics, accomplishments and the capability to share service records among other players of the game.

== Star Fleet board game ==
Advertised as "coming soon!" by Interstel in their 1988 catalogue (published 1987) but never released, this "adventure game" said to feature "exploration, space combat, planetary adventures, and much more" designed by Richard Launius and Robert Jones, Jr., based on Star Fleet I and II. Much like the original Star Fleet, players start in the Academy and compete with each other to make a fixed number of promotions, points towards this being awarded based on how well the players complete each mission.

== Star Fleet Headquarters BBS ==
This was Interstel's Star Fleet themed Bulletin Board Service, open from 8 pm – 8 am (central time). Features included multi-player games, customer support, uploading and downloading of files (including public domain software and Empire games and maps), as well as the normal BBS bulletins (including bulletins for released and upcoming software), messaging and conference services. This BBS closed in 1991, the year before Interstel went out of business.

== Star Fleet II - Krellan Commander 2.0 ==
Trevor Sorensen began the development of modernised version of Star Fleet 2 in 2018. Star Fleet II Version 2.0 was released in November 2023 for sale on Steam and GOG.com.
