= Reach for the Stars (video game) =

1983 video game

- Developer: Strategic Studies Group
- Publisher: Strategic Studies Group
- Designers: Roger Keating; Ian Trout
- Platforms: Amiga, Apple II, Apple IIGS, Commodore 64, MS-DOS, Classic Mac OS, PC-98
- Release: 1983: C64, Apple II; 1988: Amiga, IIGS, MS-DOS, Mac; 1989: PC-98
- Genres: Turn-based strategy, 4X
- Modes: Single-player, multiplayer

Reach for the Stars is a science fiction strategy video game. It is the earliest known commercially published example of the 4X genre. It was written by Roger Keating and Ian Trout of SSG of Australia and published in 1983 for the Commodore 64 and then the Apple II in 1985. Versions for Classic Mac OS, Amiga, Apple IIGS, and MS-DOS were released in 1988.

Reach for the Stars was strongly influenced by the board game Stellar Conquest. Many of RFTS's features have direct correspondence in Stellar Conquest. The player commands a home star in the galaxy, and then expands to form an interstellar empire by colonizing far-off worlds, building powerful starships, and researching new technologies.

Graphics are minimal, yet the tactical and strategic elements provide countless rich combinations for colony development and interstellar warfare. The software's AI also offered a challenging opponent in single-player games. It is not uncommon for a Reach for the Stars game to take over twelve hours to complete in single-player mode and 24 hours with multiple players.

== Gameplay ==
In Versions 1 to 3 the player starts off with one planet that has Level 1 technology and a middle-level environment. Three types of ships are available:

1. Scouts – very inexpensive, incapable of fighting or carrying colonists. These can be used as a low-cost, low-risk means to learn the composition of unknown star systems or the locations and makeup of enemy fleets.
2. Transports – incapable of fighting, but can carry colonists.
3. Warships – incapable of carrying colonists, but can fight.

Screenshot

Starting players have limited funds, and have to decide where to invest the funds (technology upgrades, ships, or environmental upgrades). Upgrading a world's planetary environment, for example, means that its population grows more quickly, improving production; this is a mixed blessing, however, because if the population grows beyond the maximum allowed for that planet, the costs to feed the population skyrocket. Building a lot of ships early can win a player the game, if the player finds his enemies' home planets before they manage to upgrade their military technology; on the other hand, it can lead to a loss if the player's opponents upgrade first and attack with superior ships.

Each turn is divided into two sections – a development phase, and a movement phase. In the development phase, players work on planetary production, deciding what each planet will produce that turn. In the movement phase, players have the option to send ships to other star systems to explore, colonize, or conquer.

Because the game evolves along so many different axes of possibility, the game offers a lot of replay value. It is quite possible to save a game on the first turn, and have it play out differently each time it is restored.

A bug causes human players that do nothing to become wealthy while computer opponents fight each other. The designers added a feature that causes the computer opponents to attack the human at 20,000 credits.

== Reception ==
Reception

Review scores
Publication	Score
Computer Gaming World	4/5
Dragon	3.5/5
inCider	3/4

Computer Gaming World in 1983 found Reach for the Stars quite user-friendly and enjoyable, with the single flaw of a lack of notification of natural disasters, which could not fit onto the disk space available. The computer AI and customization of each game were particular highlights of the review. In a 1992 survey of science fiction games the magazine gave the title five of five stars, praising it as "arguably the best science fiction game ever released ... a product still worth playing". A 1994 survey of strategic space games set in the year 2000 and later gave the game four stars out of five, stating that "a worthy update would no doubt raise this game again to 5-star status". Compute! in 1986 called the game "a particularly fine simulation of galactic exploration, combat, and conquest", noting that players needed to balance several different priorities to succeed. It concluded that Reach for the Stars was "one of the better games on the market this year". inCider in 1986 gave the Apple II version three stars ("Above average") out of four, stating that while the game was "exciting", "[i]t's unromantic to say that much of the rest of the game is a matter of juggling numbers, but that's the truth". Jerry Pournelle of BYTE wrote in 1989 that the Mac version of Reach for the Stars was "certainly the best implemented" version of Stellar Conquest. The game was reviewed in 1994 in Dragon #211 by Jay & Dee in the "Eye of the Monitor" column. Jay did not rate the game, but Dee gave the game 3½ out of 5 stars.

The Macworld 1988 Game Hall of Fame named Reach for the Stars runner-up to Trust & Betrayal: The Legacy of Siboot in the Best Role-Playing Game category, calling it a "well-implemented" scenario of economic empire building in outer space.

Norman Banduch reviewed Reach for the Stars in Space Gamer No. 69. Banduch commented that "Reach For The Stars is a most addictive game. After player 10 to 15 hours a week for several months I still find it hard to save the game and go home. It offers a wide variety of set-up conditions and victory conditions, and play is never the same. The computer is a tough foe. Even after the is mastered, there are enough options and random variables to keep it from going stale. I cannot recommend it enough".

Bob Ewald reviewed Reach for the Stars in Space Gamer/Fantasy Gamer No. 77. Ewald commented that "all things considered, I really enjoyed the game. I feel parts of the combat system are illogical, but the game as a whole is great".

In 1996, Computer Gaming World declared Reach for the Stars the 51st-best computer game ever released.

== Sequel ==
Reception

Review score
Publication	Score
Computer Gaming World	3/5

A sequel to Reach for the Stars re-written for the Windows platform was released on September 14, 2000, by developer Strategic Studies Group and publisher Strategic Simulations, Inc. In 2005 Matrix Games, working alongside Strategic Studies Group, updated the 2000 release; this updated version was released in 2005.

== Books ==
A series of books was written in 2018 by the game company Greentwip, called Interstellar, Anatomy and The Garlan Wars. While its publication is still ongoing, it is being said that a TV channel would produce cinematographic films out of the books. This happened after Greentwip's founder got deep into the story and proposed to give a better and linear approach to all the species that the game aims to deliver to the player, in order to become a better "pure Sci-Fi" experience.

== See also ==
- List of 4X video games
