= Empire (1977 video game) =

Wargame

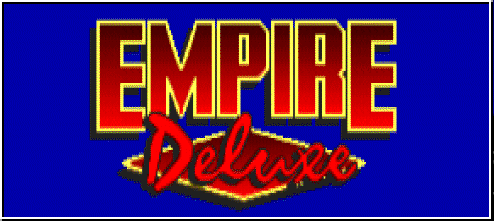
- Developers: Walter Bright; Mark Baldwin (1987–1990s); Bob Rakosky (1990s); Mark Kinkead (2001–present)
- Publishers: Interstel (1987); New World Computing (1993); Killer Bee Software (2002, 2004)
- Designers: Walter Bright/Mark Baldwin (Deluxe); Mark Kinkead (Enhanced)
- Platforms: PDP-10 (1977), ~1987 (Atari ST, Amiga, Commodore 64, Apple II, Mac, MS-DOS), Windows (1993, 2002, 2004)
- Release: 1977, 1987–1988, 1993, 2002, 2004
- Genres: Strategy, wargame, 4x
- Modes: Single-player, multiplayer

Empire is a 1977 turn-based wargame with simple rules. The game was conceived by Walter Bright starting in 1971, based on various war films and board games, notably Battle of Britain and Risk. The game was ported to many platforms in the 1970s and 1980s. Several commercial versions were also released such as Empire: Wargame of the Century, often adding basic graphics to the originally text-based user interface.

== Gameplay ==
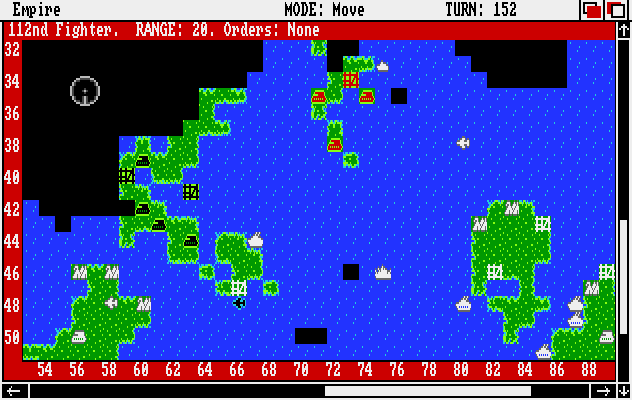
Amiga screenshot

At the start of a new game, a random game map is generated on a square grid basis. The map normally consists of numerous islands, although a variety of algorithms were used in different versions of the game, producing different styles of maps. Randomly distributed on the land are a number of cities. The players start the game controlling one of these cities each. The area immediately around the city is visible, but the rest of the world map is blacked out in a fog of war.

The city can be set to build armies, aircraft, and various types of ships. Cities take a particular number of turns to produce the various units, with the armies typically being the most rapid. Players move these units on the map to explore the world, typically seeing the land within a one square radius around the unit. As they explore they will find other cities, initially independent, and can capture them with their armies. The captured cities are then set to produce new units as well.

As the player's collection of cities expands, they are able to set aside some to produce more time-consuming items, like battleships. Ultimately they have to use these forces to take all the cities on the map, including those of the other players, who are often run by the computer's game engine.

== History and development ==
Walter Bright created Empire as a board wargame as a child, inspired by Risk, Stratego, and the film Battle of Britain. He found gameplay tedious, but later realized that a computer could handle the gameplay and serve as CPU opponent. The initial version of computer Empire was written in BASIC, before being rewritten in 1977 in the FORTRAN programming language for the PDP-10 computer at Caltech. It was so compelling as to cause video game addiction; some students failed classes while playing. "One even threatened me because of this (incredible, hmm?)", Bright recalled. He ported Empire to assembly language on a Heathkit H11 ("If I'd had a brain, I'd have bought an Apple II") and made it available commercially in 1983. Bright sold only two copies and, discouraged, returned to a "real job".

At some point, someone broke through the security systems at Caltech, and took a copy of the source code for the FORTRAN/PDP-10 version of the game. This code was continually modified, being passed around from person to person. Eventually, it was found on a computer in Massachusetts by Herb Jacobs and Dave Mitton. They ported the code to the VAX/VMS operating system and, under the alias of "DeNobili and Paulson", submitted the program to DECUS. DEC technicians routinely installed Empire with VMS. In 1983 Bright contacted DECUS, who credited him in the catalog description of the program and source code; many players became aware of the game from this version.

In 1984, Bob Norby from Fort Lauderdale, Florida, ported the DECUS version from the VAX to the PC as shareware. In 1987, Chuck Simmons re-implemented the game in C using the UNIX curses library in order to make use of its support for many different character-cell terminals. Eric S. Raymond maintains a copy of this version and shared some version with open-source projects.

In 1996, Computer Gaming World declared the original Empire the 8th-best computer game ever released. The magazine's wargame columnist Terry Coleman named it his pick for the second-best computer wargame released by late 1996, behind Panzer General.

=== Empire: Wargame of the Century ===
Bright recoded the game in C on an IBM PC. With low commercial expectations, he submitted an announcement to January 1984 BYTE Magazine's "Software Received" section, and received a flood of orders. After writing to many software companies (including Broderbund, Sirius Software, Simon & Schuster, Sublogic, Epyx, and MicroProse), he licensed the game to a small software company named Interstel. Mark Baldwin was brought in to coauthor the game redesigning it for the commercial market. Starting around 1987, Empire: Wargame of the Century on the Atari ST, Amiga, Commodore 64, Apple II, Macintosh, and MS-DOS was produced.

=== Empire Deluxe ===
In the early 1990s, Mark Baldwin and Bob Rakowsky rewrote the game, calling it Empire Deluxe for MS-DOS, Classic Mac OS, and Windows, released in 1993 with New World Computing as the publisher. Empire Deluxe sustained the old game play of Interstel's version in a standard game, while adding a basic version for beginners, and advanced game with new units such as the Bomber and Armor and map sizes up to 200×200.

An expansion pack, Empire Deluxe Scenarios, was produced later in 1993, including a map and scenario statistics tool, a map randomiser tool (as random maps were present in the Interstel version, but lacking from Empire Deluxe), upgrade patches for both DOS and Windows versions and a collection of 37 scenarios (with accompanying maps) from "celebrity" designers, many of them famous in the games industry including Will Wright, Jerry Pournelle, Jim Dunnigan, Johnny Wilson (Computer Gaming World editor), Gordon Walton, Don Gilman (Harpoon series architect), Trevor Sorensen (Star Fleet series designer), and the game's authors Mark Baldwin and Bob Rakosky.

Computer Gaming World in 1993 called Empire Deluxe "a welcome addiction (sic) to the library of every serious strategy gamer". A 1993 survey in the magazine of wargames gave the game four stars out of five, noting flaws but stating that "Yet, I keep on playing". It enjoyed great success, and was noted as one of Gamespy's Greatest Games of All Time. Empire Deluxe was reviewed in 1993 in Dragon #195 by Hartley, Patricia, and Kirk Lesser in "The Role of Computers" column. The reviewers gave the game 4 out of 5 stars. In 1994, PC Gamer US named Empire Deluxe the 35th best computer game ever. The editors called it an "elegant" and "adaptable" game system that allowed "almost endless" replayability.

Computer Gaming World in 1993 stated that Empire Deluxe Scenarios offered "a lot of value" to the game's fans.

=== Killer Bee Software ===
In the Winter of 2002, Mark Kinkead of Killer Bee Software purchased the rights for Empire Deluxe from Mark Baldwin and Bob Rakowsky, and in 2003 produced a new version called Empire Deluxe Internet Edition (EDIE) for Windows. This was essentially a port of the code Baldwin and Rakowsky produced in 1993, with few changes, such as a slightly increased map size (255×255), but did not add any new rules. A year later, Kinkead would create an "Enhanced" version with new units and rules, including artillery, engineers and orbital units. The company produced several other editions for Windows, Android, and iOS.

== Legacy ==
There are ports and source code for modern PC operating systems available for free download at Walter Bright's Classic Empire webpage. Strategic Conquest, not associated with Bright, is based on Empire.

Sid Meier has stated that Empire inspired his Civilization series.

=== Sequel ===
In 1995, New World Computing published a sequel named Empire II: The Art of War. While the original had been a turn-based strategy, Empire II was shifted towards turn-based tactics: there was no more empire-building and production of units, but the complexity and realism of battles were enhanced with features such as morale rules and various degrees of damage. The playable campaigns consisted of a collection of diverse historical or fictional battles. The game editor feature was enhanced by allowing the user to design not only new maps and campaigns, but also new units with new graphics and sounds.
