= Tom Chick =

American actor (born 1966)

- Chick in September 2006
- Born: August 14, 1966 (age 60)
- Education: Harvard University (MTS)
- Occupations: Actor; journalist; critic
- Known for: The Office; The West Wing; Quarter to Three

Tom W. Chick (born August 14, 1966) is an American actor and independent journalist. His most prominent TV roles were as Oscar's boyfriend Gil in the U.S. version of The Office, and the hard-hitting reporter Gordon in The West Wing.

== Early life and education ==
Chick attended Harvard Divinity School and received a Master of Theological Studies with a focus on the Old Testament.

== Career ==
Deciding not to pursue the ministry, he later moved to Hollywood, California, where he pursued a career in writing about video games and occasionally acting for television roles. He is also the co-founder and administrator of a web-based site for games discussion, Quarter to Three.

Chick is an independent journalist whose columns on video games have appeared online and in print. As a freelance columnist, he has written for a number of sites, including Firing Squad, Yahoo Games, GameSpy, GameSpot, Xtreme Gamer, 1Up, Rotten Tomatoes and others. His articles have also appeared in magazines such as the "Tom vs. Bruce" series in Computer Gaming World, and he was listed as "one of the field's rare American practitioners" in an article on "New Games Journalism" in The New York Times.

In May 2008, he partnered with the Syfy as editor-in-chief of a new co-branded gaming blog, entitled Fidgit.

Chick's most successful television acting engagement was a recurring role as reporter Gordon in nine episodes of The West Wing. He also played Oscar's homosexual lover Gil in The Office, and Mario in The Nine.

== Personal life ==
In late September 2014, Chick revealed in a podcast that he had stage four Hypopharyngeal cancer and was about to begin chemotherapy.

== Filmography ==
=== Film ===
Year	Title	Role	Notes
1994	Frank and Jesse	Detective Whitcher	

=== Television ===
Year	Title	Role	Notes
1994	Monty	Beck	Episode: "Two Cold Feet"
1994	Beverly Hills, 90210	Joe	Episode: "Rock of Ages"
1994, 1995	Living Single	Aaron	2 episodes
1996	NewsRadio	Employee	Episode: "The Song Remains the Same"
1997	ER	Weissbroot	Episode: "Friendly Fire"
1997	Frasier	Waiter #1 / Waiter	2 episodes
2001	The King of Queens	Guy	Episode: "Wedding Presence"
2001	Spin City	Employee	Episode: "A Shot in the Dark: Part 2"
2001	Grounded for Life	Mr. Sanders	Episode: "Dream On"
2003	Joan of Arcadia	Reporter #2	Episode: "The Devil Made Me Do It"
2003–2005	The West Wing	Gordon	9 episodes
2006	The Nine	Mario	2 episodes
2006–2007	The Office	Gil	4 episodes
