= 4X =

Genre of strategy-based video and board games

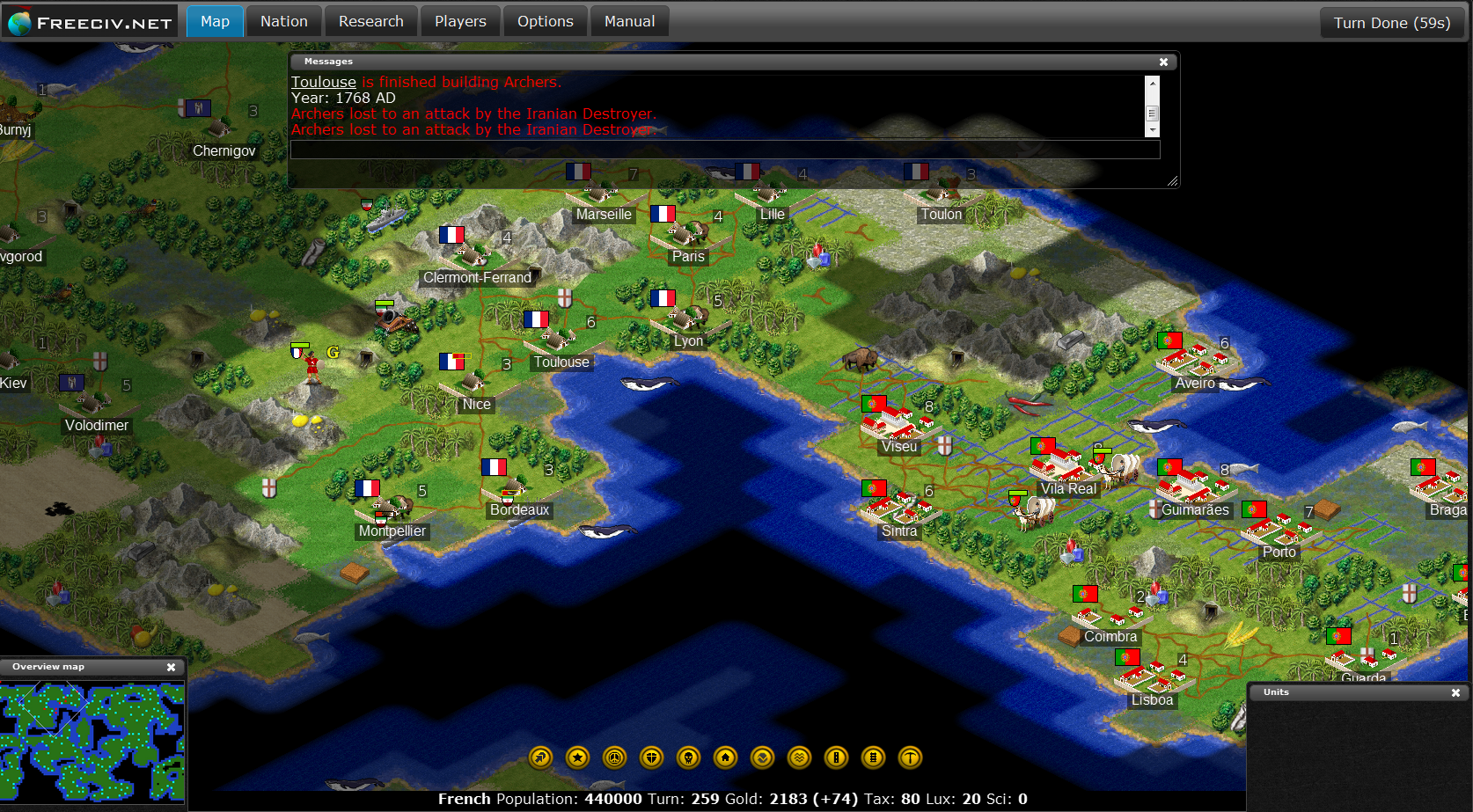
Detailed empire management, seen here in Freeciv, is a central aspect of 4X strategy games.

4X (abbreviation of Explore, Expand, Exploit, Exterminate) is a subgenre of strategy-based computer and board games, and includes both turn-based and real-time strategy titles. The gameplay generally involves building an empire. Emphasis is placed upon economic and technological development, as well as a range of military and non-military routes to supremacy.

The earliest 4X games borrowed ideas from board games and 1970s text-based computer games. The first 4X computer games were turn-based, but real-time 4X games were also common. Many 4X computer games were published in the mid-1990s, but were later outsold by other types of strategy games. Sid Meier's Civilization is an important example from this formative era, and popularized the level of detail that later became a staple of the genre. In the new millennium, several 4X releases have become critically and commercially successful.

In the board and card game domain, 4X is less of a distinct genre, in part because of the practical constraints of components and playing time. The Civilization board game that gave rise to Sid Meier's Civilization, for instance, includes neither exploration nor extermination. Unless extermination is targeted at non-player entities, it tends to be either nearly impossible (because of play balance mechanisms, since player elimination is usually considered an undesirable feature) or certainly unachievable (because victory conditions are triggered before extermination can be completed) in board games.

== Definition ==
4X computer games such as Master of Orion II let empires explore the map, expanding by founding new colonies and exploiting their resources. The game can be won by becoming an elected leader of the galaxy, exterminating all opponents, or eliminating the Antarans.

The term "4X" originates from a 1993 preview of Master of Orion in Computer Gaming World by game writer Alan Emrich where he rated the game "XXXX" as a pun on the XXX rating for pornography. The four Xs were an abbreviation for "EXplore, EXpand, EXploit and EXterminate". Emrich wrote, "Quadruple-X - I give MOO a XXXX rating because it features the essential four X's of any good strategic conquest game: EXplore, EXpand, EXploit and EXterminate. In other words, players must rise from humble beginnings, finding their way around the map while building up the largest, most efficient empire possible. Naturally, the other players will be trying to do the same, therefore their extermination becomes a paramount concern. A classic situation, indeed, and when the various parts are properly designed, other X’s seem to follow. Words like EXcite, EXperiment and EXcuses (to one’s significant others) must be added to a gamer’s X-Rating list."

By February 1994, another author in the magazine said that Command Adventures: Starship "only pays lip service to the four Xs", and other game commentators adopted the "4X" label to describe similar games.

The 4X game genre has come to be defined as having the four following gameplay conventions:

- Explore means players send scouts across a map to reveal surrounding territories.
- Expand means players claim new territory by creating new settlements, or sometimes by extending the influence of existing settlements.
- Exploit means players gather and use resources in areas they control, and improve the efficiency of that usage.
- Exterminate means attacking and eliminating rival players. Since in some games all territory is eventually claimed, eliminating a rival's presence may be the only way to achieve further expansion.

These gameplay elements may happen in separate phases of gameplay, or may overlap with each other over varying lengths of game time depending on game design. For example, the Space Empires series and Galactic Civilizations II: Dark Avatar have a long expansion phase, because players must make large investments in research to explore and expand into all areas.

Emrich later expanded his concept for designing Master of Orion 3 with a fifth X, eXperience, an aspect that came with the subject matter of the game.

=== Modern definition ===
In modern-day usage, 4X games are different from other strategy games such as Command & Conquer by their greater complexity and scale, and their complex use of diplomacy.

Reviewers have also said that 4X games feature a range of diplomatic options, and that they are well known for their large detailed empires and complex gameplay. In particular, 4X games offer detailed control over an empire's economy, while other computer strategy games simplify this in favor of combat-focused gameplay.

== Game design ==
4X computer and board games are a subgenre of strategy games, and include both turn-based and real-time strategy titles. The gameplay involves building an empire, which takes place in a setting such as Earth, a fantasy world, or in space. Each player takes control of a different civilization or race with unique characteristics and strengths. Most 4X games give each faction unique economic and military bonuses.

=== Research and technology ===
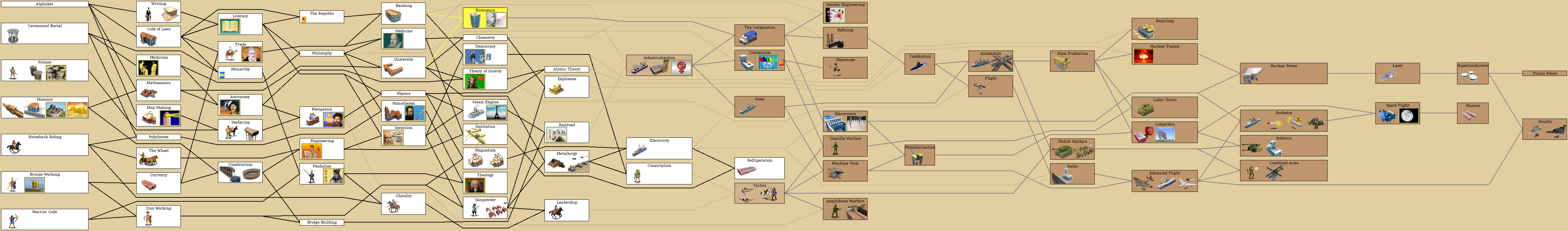
One part of Freeciv's technology tree. Note the complex dependencies between technologies.

4X games typically feature a technology tree, which represents a series of advancements that players can unlock to gain new units, buildings, and other capabilities. Technology trees in 4X games are typically larger than in other strategy games, featuring a larger selection of different choices. Empires must generate research resources and invest them in new technology. In 4X games, the main prerequisite for researching an advanced technology is knowledge of earlier technology. This is in contrast to non-4X real-time strategy games, where technological progress is achieved by building structures that grant access to more advanced structures and units.

Research is important in 4X games because technological progress is an engine for conquest. Battles are often won by superior military technology or greater numbers, with battle tactics playing a smaller part. In contrast, military upgrades in non-4X games are sometimes small enough that technologically basic units remain important throughout the game.

=== Combat ===
Combat is an important part of 4X gameplay, because 4X games allow a player to win by exterminating all rival players, or by conquering a threshold amount of the game's universe. Some 4X games, such as Galactic Civilizations, resolve battles automatically, whenever two units from warring sides meet. This is in contrast to other 4X games, such as Master of Orion, that allow players to manage battles on a tactical battle screen. Even in 4X games with more detailed control over battles, victory is usually determined by superior numbers and technology, with battle tactics playing a smaller part. 4X games differ from other combat-focused strategy games by putting more emphasis on research and economics. Researching new technology will grant access to new combat units. Some 4X games even allow players to research different unit components. This is more typical of space 4X games, where players may assemble a ship from a variety of engines, shields, and weaponry.

=== Peaceful competition ===
4X games allow rival players to engage in diplomacy. While some strategy games may offer shared victory and team play, diplomatic relations tend to be restricted to a binary choice between an ally or enemy. 4X games often allow more complex diplomatic relations between competitors who are not on the same team. Aside from making allies and enemies, players are also able to trade resources and information with rivals.

In addition to victory through conquest, 4X games offer peaceful victory conditions or goals that involve no extermination of rival players (although war may still be a necessary by-product of reaching said goal). For example, a 4X game may offer victory to a player who achieves a certain score or the highest score after a certain number of turns. Many 4X games award victory to the first player to master an advanced technology, accumulate a large amount of culture, or complete an awe-inspiring achievement. Several 4X games award "diplomatic victory" to anyone who can win an election decided by their rival players, or maintain peace for a specified number of turns. Galactic Civilizations has a diplomatic victory which involves having alliances with at least four factions, with no factions outside of one's alliance; there are two ways to accomplish this: ally with all factions, or ally with at least the minimum number of factions and destroy the rest.

=== Complexity ===
4X games are known for their complex gameplay and strategic depth. Gameplay usually takes priority over elaborate graphics. Whereas other strategy games focus on combat, 4X games also offer more detailed control over diplomacy, economics, and research; creating opportunities for diverse strategies. This also challenges the player to manage several strategies simultaneously, and plan for long-term objectives.

To experience a detailed model of a large empire, 4X games are designed with a complex set of game rules. For example, the player's productivity may be limited by pollution. Players may need to balance a budget, such as managing debt, or paying down maintenance costs. 4X games often model political challenges such as civil disorder, or a senate that can oust the player's political party or force them to make peace.

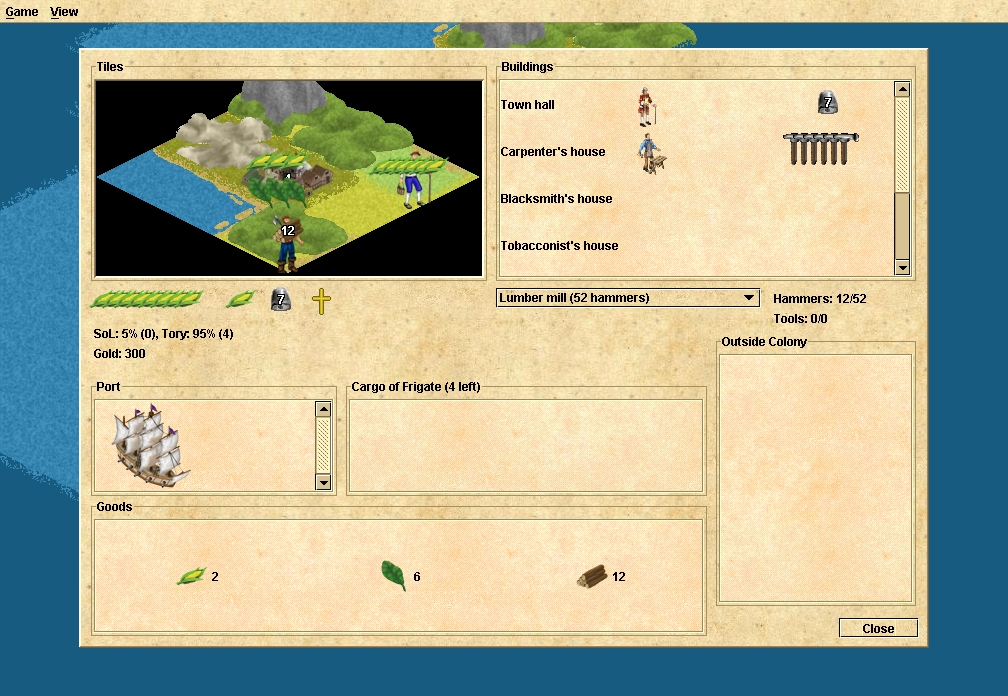
FreeCol is typical of 4X games where there is a separate interface for managing each settlement.

Such complexity requires players to manage a larger amount of information than other strategy games. Game designers often organize empire management into different interface screens and modes, such as a separate screen for diplomacy, managing individual settlements, and managing battle tactics. Sometimes systems are intricate enough to resemble a minigame. This is in contrast to most real-time strategy games. Dune II, which arguably established the conventions for the real-time strategy genre, was fundamentally designed to be a "flat interface", with no additional screens.

=== Gameplay ===
Since 4X games involve managing a large, detailed empire, game sessions usually last longer than other strategy games. Game sessions may require several hours of play-time, which can be particularly problematic for multiplayer matches. For example, a small-scale game in Sins of a Solar Empire can last longer than twelve hours. However, fans of the genre often expect and embrace these long game sessions; Emrich wrote that "when the various parts are properly designed, other X's seem to follow. Words like EXcite, EXperiment and EXcuses (to one's significant others)". Turn-based 4X games typically divide these sessions into hundreds of turns of gameplay.

Because of repetitive actions and long-playing times, 4X games have been criticized for excessive micromanagement. In early stages of a game this is usually not a problem, but later in a game directing an empire's numerous settlements can demand several minutes to play a single turn. This increases playing-times, which are a particular burden in multiplayer games. 4X games began to offer AI governors that automate the micromanagement of a colony's build orders, but players criticized these governors for making poor decisions. In response, developers have tried other approaches to reduce micromanagement, and some approaches have been more well received than others. Commentators generally agree that Galactic Civilizations succeeds, which GamingNexus.com attributes to the game's use of programmable governors. Sins of a Solar Empire was designed to reduce the incentives for micromanagement, and reviewers found that the game's interface made empire management more elegant. On the other hand, Master of Orion III reduced micromanagement by limiting complete player control over their empire.

=== Victory conditions ===
Most 4X and similar strategy games feature multiple possible ways to win the game. For example, in Civilization, players may win through total domination of all opposing players by conquest of their cities, but may also win through technological achievements (being the first to launch a spacecraft to a new planet), diplomacy (being elected the world leader by other nations), or other means. Multiple victory conditions help to support the human player who may have to shift strategies as the game progresses and opponents secure key resources before the player can. However, these multiple conditions can also give the computer-controlled opponents multiple pathways to potentially outwit the player, who is generally going to be over-powered in certain areas over the computer opponents. A component of the late-game design in 4X games is forcing the player to commit to a specific victory condition by making the cost and resources required to secure it so great that other possible victory conditions may need to be passed over.

== History ==
=== Origin ===
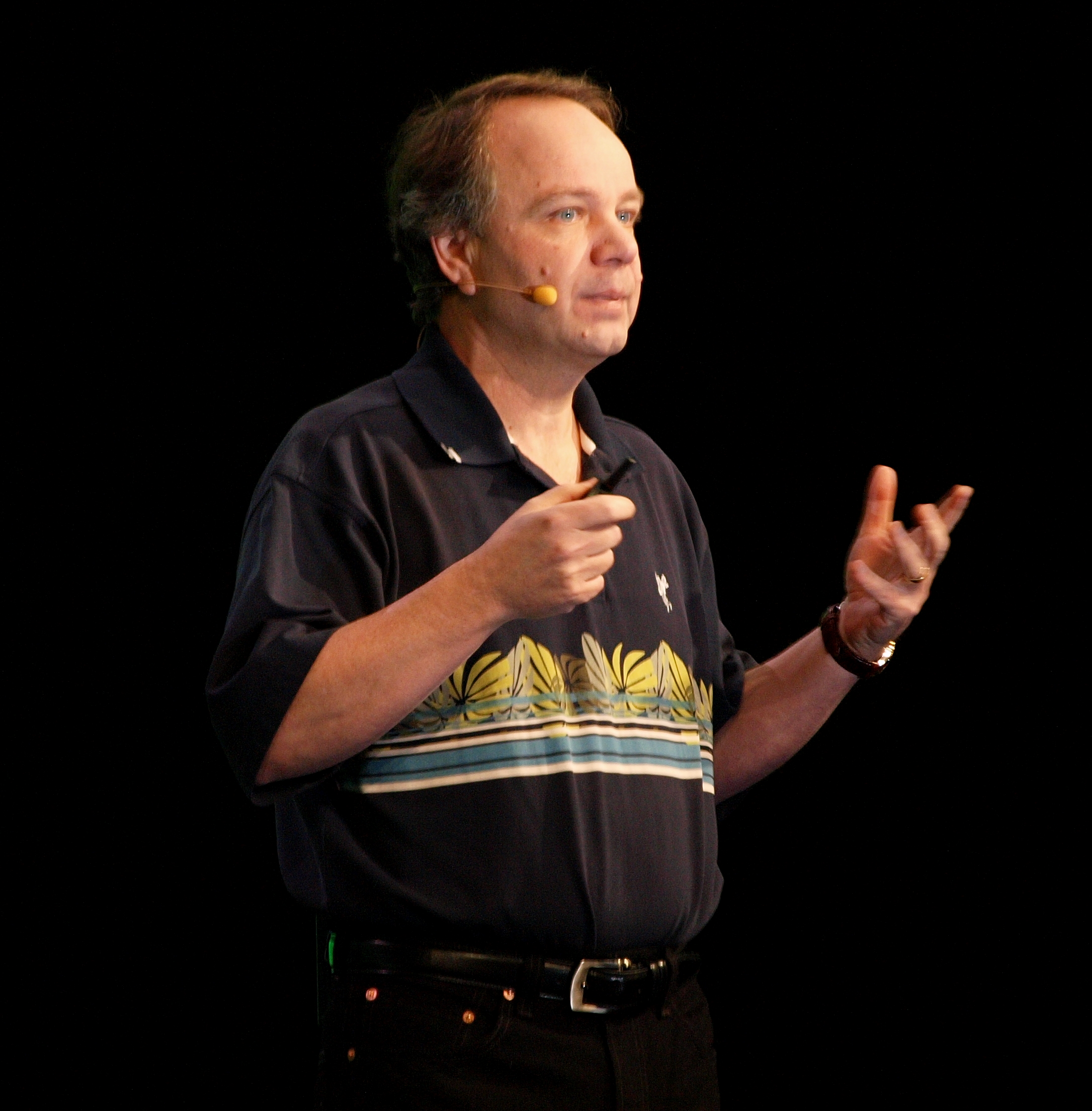
Sid Meier (in 2010), the creator of the Civilization series

Early 4X games were influenced by board games, such as Stellar Conquest published by Metagaming Concepts in 1974, and text-based computer games from the 1970s. Cosmic Balance II, Andromeda Conquest and Reach for the Stars were published in 1983, and are now seen retrospectively as 4X games. Although Andromeda Conquest was only a simple game of empire expansion, Reach for the Stars introduced the relationship between economic growth, technological progress, and conquest. Trade Wars, first released in 1984, though primarily regarded as the first multiplayer space trader, included space exploration, resource management, empire building, expansion and conquest. It has been cited by the author of VGA Planets as an important influence on VGA Planets 4.

In 1991, Sid Meier released Civilization and popularized the level of detail that has become common in the genre. Sid Meier's Civilization was influenced by board games such as Risk and the Avalon Hill board game also called Civilization. A notable similarity between the Civilization computer game and board game is the importance of diplomacy and technological advancement. Sid Meier's Civilization was also influenced by personal computer games, such as the city management game SimCity and the wargame Empire. Civilization became widely successful and influenced many 4X games to come; Computer Gaming World compared its importance to computer gaming to that of the wheel. Armada 2525 was also released in 1991 and was cited by the Chicago Tribune as the best space game of the year. A sequel, Armada 2526, was released in 2009.

In 1991, two highly influential space games were released. VGA Planets was released for the PC, while Spaceward Ho! was released on the Macintosh. Although 4X space games were ultimately more influenced by the complexity of VGA Planets, Spaceward Ho! earned praise for its relatively simple yet challenging game design. Spaceward Ho! is notable for its similarity to the 1993 game Master of Orion, with its simple yet deep gameplay. Master of Orion drew upon earlier 4X games such as Reach for the Stars, and is considered a classic game that sets a new standard for the genre. In a preview of Master of Orion, Emrich coined the term "XXXX" to describe the emerging genre. Eventually, the "4X" label was adopted by the game industry, and is now applied to several earlier game releases.

=== Peak ===
Following the success of Civilization and Master of Orion, other developers began releasing their own 4X games. In 1994, Stardock launched its first version of the Galactic Civilizations series for OS/2, and the long-standing Space Empires series began as shareware. Ascendancy and Stars! were released in 1995, and both continued the genre's emphasis on strategic depth and empire management. Meanwhile, the Civilization and Master of Orion franchises expanded their market with versions for the Macintosh. Sid Meier's team also produced Colonization in 1994 and Civilization II in 1996, while Simtex released Master of Orion in 1993, Master of Magic in 1994 and Master of Orion II in 1996.

By the late 1990s, real-time strategy games began outselling turn-based games. As they surged in popularity, major 4X developers fell into difficulties. Sid Meier's Firaxis Games released Sid Meier's Alpha Centauri in 1999 to critical acclaim, but the game fell short of commercial expectations. Civilization III encountered development problems followed by a rushed release in 2001. Despite the excitement over Master of Orion III, its release in 2003 was met with criticism for its lack of player control, poor interface, and weak AI. Game publishers eventually became risk-averse to financing the development of 4X games.

=== Recent history ===
Firaxis has continued to develop the Civilization series, with Civilization IV (2005), Civilization V (2010), Civilization VI (2016), and Civilization VII (2025), along with expansion packs for each. Among major changes to the series have been new victory conditions, switching from a square to a hex-based grid, de-stacking military units to encourage more strategic battles, and more customizable options for governance and culture. Firaxis also developed Civilization Revolution (2008) and its sequel (2014) as lightweight, console-friendly versions of 4X games, but brought the full Civilization experience to consoles with Civilization VI. Firaxis also developed a spiritual sequel to Sid Meier's Alpha Centauri with Civilization: Beyond Earth (2014). As of 2021, the Civilization series has sold more than 57 million units.

The Total War series remains in development, with the latest title, Total War: Pharaoh released in 2023.

Stardock entered the market through a remake of the 1993 OS/2 game, Galactic Civilizations (2003), a space-themed 4X game. The game was successful and was compared favorably to Master of Orion, and led Stardock to continue the series with Galactic Civilizations II: Dread Lords (2007), Galactic Civilizations III (2015), and Galactic Civilizations IV (2022).

Paradox Interactive is a company that was spun out from developing video game adaptions of board games from Target Games. Through 2000 and 2003, the company began producing their own grand strategy video games, which included the Europa Universalis series dealing with conflicts in early modern Europe, the Crusader Kings series set in the Middle Ages, the Victoria series set in the Victorian period, and the Hearts of Iron series involving World War II. These series, as of 2023, remain under active development at Paradox, along with Stellaris (2016), a grand strategy title based on space conflict. Paradox also acquired the Age of Wonders series, which is a 4X series based on a high fantasy world that includes elements of magic.

Amplitude Studios entered the 4X venue with Endless Space (2012) and its sequel (2017), Endless Legend (2014), and Humankind (2021).

The 4X genre has also been extended by gamers who have supported free software releases such as Freeciv, FreeCol, Freeorion, Golden Age of Civilizations, and C-evo. Indie game developers have also contributed towards the 4X genre during the 2010s and 2020s.

== Subgenres ==
=== Grand strategy games ===
Grand strategy games, such as Hearts of Iron, Crusader Kings, or Stellaris, are a sub-genre or sister genre of 4X that typically require even more detailed planning and execution than games like Civilization or Master of Orion. Within the realm of tabletop wargaming where grand strategy games originate, they are conventionally defined as those games in which the player governs all the capacities of a nation-state, including its economy, diplomacy, and internal politics, with a focus on grand strategy (a nation-state's generalised prerogative in defining and pursuing its interests on the world stage), as against games where the player mostly commands the military during wartime. In computer gaming, this definition holds considerable overlap with that of 4X games, thus a more restrictive set of defining traits are usually used.

Grand strategy games are typically more strategically open than 4X games, which often have well-defined, instantaneous victory conditions such as "conquer everyone" or "win the space race". Grand strategy games typically lack such victory conditions and instead scope themselves over a definite period of time, with specific starting and ending dates. As in 4X games, players are usually ranked on their overall achievements at the end of a campaign, and in grand strategies this is usually the only factor accounted for in victory. This results in longer, more complex and free-form campaigns structured largely by player-driven goals.

Grand strategy games can also differ from traditional 4X games in being "asymmetrical", meaning that players are bound to play out specific (often historical) starting conditions, rather than play as a set of equally free factions exploring and progressing in an open world. For example, 4X Civilization starts all players on equal footing, as small tribes in a largely ahistoric wilderness, while some grand strategies seek to at least approximately represent the actual conditions of their time period, even when those are not fairly balanced toward all players.

The open-ended, sprawling, and convoluted nature of grand strategy campaigns makes even major asymmetries strategically tractable: with no hard victory conditions, players in grand strategy games are not implicitly engaged to compete in a race to the finish. As there is no way for players to "rush" toward instant victory thresholds (military or otherwise), and thus no simple way for any one player to credibly brandish the threat of imminent and irremediable defeat against the others, contest in grand strategies typically emerges more organically than in 4X games, when and where it is geopolitically meaningful, rather than as the inevitable outcome of a game's initial configuration as a battle royal.

=== Real-time hybrid 4X ===
Eventually real-time 4X games were released, such as Imperium Galactica in 1997, Starships Unlimited in 2001, and Sword of the Stars in 2006, featuring a combination of turn-based strategy and real-time tactical combat. The blend of 4X and real-time strategy gameplay led Ironclad Games to market their 2008 release Sins of a Solar Empire as a "RT4X" game. This combination of features earned the game a mention as one of the top games from 2008, including GameSpot's award for best strategy game, and IGN's award for best PC game. The Total War series, debuting in 2000 with Shogun: Total War, combines a turn-based campaign map and real-time tactical battles.

== 4X in board games ==
Cross-fertilization between board games and video games continued. For example, some aspects of Master of Orion III were drawn from the first edition of the board game Twilight Imperium. Even Sins of a Solar Empire was inspired by the idea of adapting the board game Buck Rogers Battle for the 25th Century into a real-time video game. Going in the opposite direction, in 2002 Eagle Games made a board game adaptation of Sid Meier's Civilization, entitled simply Sid Meier's Civilization: The Boardgame, significantly different from the board game that had inspired the computer game in the first place. Another remake based on that series, under a very similar title, Sid Meier's Civilization: The Board Game, was released in 2010 by Fantasy Flight Games, followed by Civilization: A New Dawn in 2017.

Through the Ages: A Story of Civilization is a board game for 2–4 players designed by Vlaada Chvatil and published by Czech Board Games in 2006. Its theme is the development of human civilization and the players determine the progress of their own civilization in different fields including culture, government, leadership, religion and science. The game won multiple awards including the International Gamers Awards in 2007 and Game of the Year in Poland in 2010, where it was published as Cywilizacja: Poprzez Wieki. Scythe is a board game for one to five players designed by Jamey Stegmaier and published by Stonemaier Games in 2016. Set in an alternate history version of 1920s Europe, players control factions that produce resources, develop economic infrastructure, and use dieselpunk war machines, called "mechs", to engage in combat and control territories. Players take up to two actions per turn using individual player boards, and the game proceeds until one player has earned six achievements. At this point, the players receive coins for the achievements they have attained and the territories they control, and the player with the most coins is declared the winner. As of June 2023, BoardGameGeek listed slightly over 200 board games classified under 4X type, including titles such as Eclipse (2011) and Heroes of Land, Air & Sea (2018).

== Criticism ==
4X and its subgenres have been criticized for gamifying imperialism and promoting Eurocentric colonialism. Nicholas Pullen from McGill University writes that the four pillars of 4X games—exploration, expansion, exploitation, extermination—could be considered as a "distillation of the very essence of colonialism". According to Pullen, as Gamergate indicated, disaffected white men want to preserve video games as one of their few remaining exclusive spaces. Fieldling Mellish from Doxa notes that this explains why attempts to challenge the games' canon—which is usually racist, xenophobic, and sexist—are met with fierce backlash.

One of the main concepts of 4X games is the contrast of "civilizations" to "barbarians", which are controlled by AI and portrayed as "aggressive, hostile, and destructive". However, anthropologist James C. Scott states that barbarians were neither primitive nor backward, but instead political and economic refugees that fled to avoid artificial scarcity, taxes, slavery, and war—which were imposed by the government. After a civilization destroys barbarians, their settlements are permanently erased off the map. Barbarians are also unable to research technology, while factions follow a linear technology tree. Mellish argues that this reinforces the idea of every country following the same path, advanced countries "naturally" dominating "backward" ones, and national characteristics being the reason for a country's failure. Fieldling compares this to the International Monetary Fund promoting neoliberalism in developing countries as to implement the "advanced experience" of the Western world, and then blaming failure on government inefficiency or a "backward" culture.

According to Rolf Nohr of the Braunschweig University of Art, the gameplay of modern 4X games is based on an expansionist concept similar to Lebensraum. In these games, conquest is a requirement for political victory, and is defined as liberation of an occupied space, which is then annexed by the player. The state is portrayed as an organism that, to be "healthy", must grow and gain more space by engaging in resource war. Nohr describes strategy games as repeated narrations of the Clash of Civilizations, citing the large focus on conflict and us vs. them politics.

== See also ==
- List of 4X video games
