= Theatrhythm =

Theatrhythm may refer to:

- Theatrhythm Final Fantasy
- Theatrhythm Final Fantasy: Curtain Call
- Theatrhythm Dragon Quest
- Theatrhythm Final Bar Line
