= Endless Dungeon =

- Developer(s): Amplitude Studios
- Publisher(s): Sega
- Director(s): Jean-Maxime Moris
- Designer(s): Arthur Prudent
- Writer(s): Jeff Spock
- Series: Endless
- Engine: Unity
- Platform(s): Microsoft Windows; PlayStation 4; PlayStation 5; Xbox One; Xbox Series X/S; Nintendo Switch
- Release: Windows, PS4, PS5, Xbox One, Xbox Series X/S; October 19, 2023; Nintendo Switch; TBA
- Genre(s): Tower defense, twin-stick shooter, roguelike
- Mode(s): Single-player, multiplayer

Endless Dungeon is a tower defense twin-stick shooter video game developed by Amplitude Studios and published by Sega. The game is a successor to Dungeon of the Endless (2014) and was released on October 19, 2023, for Microsoft Windows, PlayStation 4, PlayStation 5, Xbox One and Xbox Series X and Series S.

== Gameplay ==
In Endless Dungeon, the player is able to control a squad of two to three characters as they explore an abandoned space station. The game will feature eight playable characters at launch, with each having their own unique weapons, skills and abilities. If the player plays solo, they will only assume direct control of one character, while issuing commands to the others, the player can switch to the other characters though if they feel like they want to change their gameplay. The game also supports cooperative multiplayer, allowing up to three players to work and coordinate with each other.

The squad's goal is to protect a "Crystal Bot" as it moves towards a bulkhead door of each level. The game features ten different levels, and each floor of the space station is procedurally generated. While exploring, players would find new rooms which have generator spots that grant them new resources, including food, science, industry, medkits, and Dust Shards. They can be used to heal the squad (use food resource to make medkits), research (use science resource) and build turrets (use industry resource), and upgrade the Crystal Bot (use Dust Shards). However, during some of those actions like research or when you open doors to new area, or when you move the Crystal Bot hordes of enemies may also spawn and attempt to destroy the Crystal Bot. While the game plays in real-time, resources would only be given to the player when they open a new door.

Endless Dungeon also includes elements from rogue-lite games. When the player dies or fails their objectives, they will respawn at a saloon bar area where they can talk to other characters and acquire upgrades and weapon attachments before they begin another run.

== Development ==
Endless Dungeon is developed by Amplitude Studios. It was envisioned as a successor to Dungeon of the Endless, which was released in 2014. The team was surprised by player's enthusiasm for that game's multiplayer, which was described by the team as "kind of barebones in many aspects". As a result, Endless Dungeon was designed to be a multiplayer game from the ground up, but the game still includes single-player. The squad size was reduced from four to three because the team felt that solo players would be overwhelmed if they are controlling and managing all four characters at the same time. Endless Dungeon is set between Dungeon of the Endless and Endless Space 2. As a result, lore, technology and races from those game also return in Endless Dungeon. The game features music by American singer-songwriter Lera Lynn.

Publisher Sega and Amplitude Studios first announced the game at The Game Awards 2020. The game is part of Sega's OpenDev program, in which selected players can experience targeted gameplay scenarios and provide feedback to the developers. Originally planned for a May 2023 launch, the game was released on October 19, for Microsoft Windows, PlayStation 4, PlayStation 5, Xbox One and Xbox Series X/S, and will be released on the Nintendo Switch at a later date.

== Reception ==
The game received "generally favorable" reviews upon release, according to the review aggregation website Metacritic. In Japan, four critics from Famitsu gave the game a total score of 28 out of 40, with each critic awarding the game a 7 out of 10.
