= 18th Annual D.I.C.E. Awards =

Video game award ceremony

- Date: February 5, 2015
- Venue: Hard Rock Hotel and Casino
- Country: Las Vegas, Nevada, USA
- Hosted by: Pete Holmes

Highlights
- Most awards: Middle-earth: Shadow of Mordor (8)
- Most nominations: Middle-earth: Shadow of Mordor (9)
- Game of the Year: Dragon Age: Inquisition
- Pioneer: Allan Alcorn and Ralph H. Baer

The 18th Annual D.I.C.E. Awards was the 18th edition of the D.I.C.E. Awards, an annual awards event that honored the best games in the video game industry during 2014. The awards were arranged by the Academy of Interactive Arts & Sciences (AIAS), and were held at the Hard Rock Hotel and Casino in Las Vegas, Nevada on February 5, 2015. It was also held as part of the Academy's 2015 D.I.C.E. Summit, and was hosted by stand-up comedian Pete Holmes.

The category for the "D.I.C.E. Sprite Award" was introduced. The category of "Outstanding Achievement in Game Design" was re-introduced after a four-year hiatus. The award for "Online Game of the Year" has been relabeled as "Outstanding Achievement in Online Gameplay". The categories for the "Downloadable Game of the Year" and "Casual Game of the Year" were discontinued. The craft awards for "Gameplay Engineering" and "Visual Engineering" were merged into the "Outstanding Technical Achievement" award category.

Middle-earth: Shadow of Mordor had nearly swept all of its nominated categories with eight wins, yet failed to win "Game of the Year", which was awarded to Dragon Age: Inquisition. Ubisoft published the most nominated games and received the most nominations as a publisher with Ubisoft Montreal receiving the most nominations as a developer. Nintendo had published the most award-winning games.

Allan Alcorn received the "Pioneer Award" for creating Pong, one of the first video games. Ralph H. Baer, designer of the Magnavox Odyssey, also was posthumously awarded the "Pioneer Award." The Apple App Store received the first "Technical Impact Award".

== Winners and Nominees ==
Winners are listed first, highlighted in boldface, and indicated with a double dagger (‡).

=== Game of the Year awards ===
**Game of the Year**: **Dragon Age: Inquisition** — **BioWare**, **Electronic Arts**‡; Destiny — Bungie, Activision; Far Cry 4 — Ubisoft Montreal; Hearthstone: Heroes of Warcraft — Blizzard Entertainment; Middle-earth: Shadow of Mordor — Monolith Productions, Warner Bros. Interactive Entertainment	**D.I.C.E. Sprite Award**: **Transistor** — **Supergiant Games**‡; Hohokum — Honeyslug, Sony Computer Entertainment; Monument Valley — ustwo; The Banner Saga — Stoic, Versus Evil; Threes — Sirvo
**Handheld Game of the Year**: **Super Smash Bros. for Nintendo 3DS** — **Sora Ltd.**, **Bandai Namco Games**, **Nintendo**‡; Bravely Default — Silicon Studio, Nintendo; Child of Light — Ubisoft Montreal; Shovel Knight — Yacht Club Games; Theatrhythm Final Fantasy: Curtain Call — Square Enix, indieszero	**Mobile Game of the Year**: **Hearthstone: Heroes of Warcraft** — **Blizzard Entertainment**‡; 80 Days — Inkle; Kingdom Rush: Origins — Ironhide Game Studio, Armor Games; Monument Valley — ustwo; Threes — Sirvo
**Outstanding Achievement in Online Gameplay**: **Destiny** — **Bungie**, **Activision**‡; Call of Duty: Advanced Warfare — Sledgehammer Games, Activision; Elite Dangerous — Frontier Developments; Hearthstone: Heroes of Warcraft — Blizzard Entertainment; World of Tanks [Xbox 360] — Wargaming	**Outstanding Innovation in Gaming**: **Middle-earth: Shadow of Mordor** — **Monolith Productions**, **Warner Bros. Interactive Entertainment**‡; Destiny — Bungie, Activision; Hearthstone: Heroes of Warcraft — Blizzard Entertainment; Monument Valley — ustwo; Project Spark — Team Dakota, Microsoft Studios

=== Craft awards ===
**Outstanding Achievement in Game Direction**: **Middle-earth: Shadow of Mordor** — **Monolith Productions**, **Warner Bros. Interactive Entertainment**‡; Lumino City — State of Play Games; Monument Valley — ustwo; Never Alone (Kisima Ingitchuna) — Upper One Games, E-Line Media; The Vanishing of Ethan Carter — The Astronauts	**Outstanding Achievement in Game Design**: **Middle-earth: Shadow of Mordor** — **Monolith Productions**, **Warner Bros. Interactive Entertainment**‡; Dungeon of the Endless — Amplitude Studios; Far Cry 4 — Ubisoft Montreal; Hearthstone: Heroes of Warcraft — Blizzard Entertainment; Titanfall — Respawn Entertainment, Electronic Arts
**Outstanding Achievement in Animation**: **Middle-earth: Shadow of Mordor** — **Monolith Productions**, **Warner Bros. Interactive Entertainment**‡; Assassin's Creed Unity — Ubisoft Montreal; Infamous Second Son — Sucker Punch Productions, Sony Computer Entertainment; Sunset Overdrive — Insomniac Games, Microsoft Studios; Titanfall — Respawn Entertainment, Electronic Arts	**Outstanding Achievement in Art Direction**: **Monument Valley** — **ustwo**‡; Assassin's Creed Unity — Ubisoft Montreal; Sunset Overdrive — Insomniac Games, Microsoft Studios; The Vanishing of Ethan Carter — The Astronauts; Valiant Hearts: The Great War — Ubisoft Montpellier
**Outstanding Achievement in Character**: **Talion** **(Middle-earth: Shadow of Mordor)** — **Monolith Productions**, **Warner Bros. Interactive Entertainment**‡; Jonathan Irons (Call of Duty: Advance Warfare) — Sledgehammer Games, Activision; Pagan Min (Far Cry 4) — Ubisoft Montreal; Abigail "Fetch" Walker (Infamous First Light) — Sucker Punch Productions, Sony Computer Entertainment; Delsin Rowe (Infamous Second Son) — Sucker Punch Productions, Sony Computer Entertainment	**Outstanding Achievement in Original Music Composition**: **Destiny** — **Bungie**, **Activision**‡; Far Cry 4 — Ubisoft Montreal; Lara Croft and the Temple of Osiris — Crystal Dynamics, Square Enix Europe; The Vanishing of Ethan Carter — The Astronauts; Transistor — Supergiant Games
**Outstanding Achievement in Sound Design**: **Destiny** — **Bungie**, **Activision**‡; Assassin's Creed Unity — Ubisoft Montreal; Call of Duty: Advanced Warfare — Sledgehammer Games, Activision; Far Cry 4 — Ubisoft Montreal; Valiant Hearts: The Great War — Ubisoft Montpellier	**Outstanding Achievement in Story**: **Middle-earth: Shadow of Mordor** — **Monolith Productions**, **Warner Bros. Interactive Entertainment**‡; South Park: The Stick of Truth — Obsidian Entertainment, South Park Digital Studios, Ubisoft; The Wolf Among Us — Telltale Games; This War of Mine — 11 Bit Studios; Valiant Hearts: The Great War — Ubisoft Montpellier
**Outstanding Technical Achievement**: **Middle-earth: Shadow of Mordor** — **Monolith Productions**, **Warner Bros. Interactive Entertainment**‡; Call of Duty: Advanced Warfare — Sledgehammer Games, Activision; Far Cry 4 — Ubisoft Montreal; Infamous Second Son — Sucker Punch Productions, Sony Computer Entertainment; Sunset Overdrive — Insomniac Games, Microsoft Studios

=== Genre awards ===
**Action Game of the Year**: **Destiny** — **Bungie**, **Activision**‡; Call of Duty: Advanced Warfare — Sledgehammer Games, Activision; Far Cry 4 — Ubisoft Montreal; Titanfall — Respawn Entertainment, Electronic Arts; Wolfenstein: The New Order — MachineGames, Bethesda Softworks	**Adventure Game of the Year**: **Middle-earth: Shadow of Mordor** — **Monolith Productions**, **Warner Bros. Interactive Entertainment**‡; Infamous Second Son — Sucker Punch Productions, Sony Computer Entertainment; The Vanishing of Ethan Carter — The Astronauts; The Wolf Among Us — Telltale Games; Valiant Hearts: The Great War — Ubisoft Montpellier
**Family Game of the Year**: **LittleBigPlanet 3** — **Sumo Digital**, **Sony Computer Entertainment**‡; Disney Infinity 2.0: Marvel Super Heroes — Avalanche Software, Heavy Iron Studios, Disney Interactive Studios; Lego Batman 3: Beyond Gotham — Traveller's Tales, Warner Bros. Interactive Entertainment; Project Spark — Team Dakota, Microsoft Studios; Skylanders: Trap Team — Toys for Bob, Beenox, Activision	**Fighting Game of the Year**: **Super Smash Bros. for Wii U** — **Sora Ltd.**, **Bandai Namco Games**, **Nintendo**‡; Guilty Gear Xrd -SIGN- — Arc System Works, Aksys Games; Nidhogg — Messhof; Ultra Street Fighter IV — Dimps, Capcom
**Racing Game of the Year**: **Mario Kart 8** — **Nintendo EAD**‡; Forza Horizon 2 — Playground Games, Microsoft Game Studios; The Crew — Ivory Tower, Ubisoft	**Role-Playing/Massively Multiplayer Game of the Year**: **Dragon Age: Inquisition** — **BioWare**, **Electronic Arts**‡; Bravely Default — Silicon Studio, Nintendo; Divinity: Original Sin — Larian Studios; The Banner Saga — Stoic, Versus Evil; World of Warcraft: Warlords of Draenor — Blizzard Entertainment
**Sports Game of the Year**: **FIFA 15** — **EA Canada**‡; Madden NFL 15 — EA Tiburon; MLB 14: The Show — SCE San Diego; NBA 2K15 — Visual Concepts, 2K Games	**Strategy/Simulation Game of the Year**: **Hearthstone: Heroes of Warcraft** — **Blizzard Entertainment**‡; Boom Beach — Supercell; Civilization: Beyond Earth — Firaxis Games, 2K Games; Dungeon of the Endless — Amplitude Studios; Endless Legend — Amplitude Studios, Iceberg Interactive

=== Special awards ===
==== Pioneer ====
- Allan Alcorn
- Ralph H. Baer

==== Technical Impact ====
- Apple App Store

=== Multiple nominations and awards ===
==== Multiple Nominations ====
Games that received multiple nominations
Nominations	Game
9	Middle-earth: Shadow of Mordor
7	Far Cry 4
6	Destiny
6	Hearthstone: Heroes of Warcraft
5	Call of Duty: Advanced Warfare
5	Monument Valley
4	Infamous Second Son
4	The Vanishing of Ethan Carter
4	Valiant Hearts: The Great War
3	Assassin's Creed Unity
3	Sunset Overdrive
3	Titanfall
2	Bravely Default
2	Dragon Age: Inquisition
2	Dungeon of the Endless
2	Project Spark
2	Super Smash Bros. for Nintendo 3DS and Wii U
2	The Banner Saga
2	The Wolf Among Us
2	Threes
2	Transistor

Nominations by company
Nominations	Games	Company
17	6	Ubisoft
12	3	Activision
10	2	Warner Bros. Interactive Entertainment
9	1	Monolith Productions
8	5	Sony Computer Entertainment
7	4	Electronic Arts
7	2	Blizzard Entertainment
6	3	Microsoft Studios
6	1	Bungie
5	4	Nintendo
5	2	Sucker Punch Productions
5	1	Sledgehammer Games
5	1	ustwo
4	1	The Astronauts
3	2	Amplitude Studios
3	1	Insomniac Games
3	1	Respawn Entertainment
2	2	2K Games
2	2	Bandai Namco Games
2	2	Sora Ltd.
2	2	Square Enix
2	1	BioWare
2	1	Silicon Studio
2	1	Sirvo
2	1	Stoic
2	1	Supergiant Games
2	1	Team Dakota
2	1	Telltale Games
2	1	Versus Evil

==== Multiple awards ====
Games that received multiple awards
Awards	Game
8	Middle-earth: Shadow of Mordor
4	Destiny
2	Dragon Age: Inquisition
2	Hearthstone: Heroes of Warcraft
2	Super Smash Bros. for Nintendo 3DS and Wii U

Awards by company
Awards	Games	Company
8	1	Monolith Productions
8	1	Warner Bros. Interactive Entertainment
4	1	Activision
4	1	Bungie
3	3	Nintendo
3	2	Electronic Arts
2	2	Bandai Namco Games
2	2	Sora Ltd.
2	1	Blizzard Entertainment
2	1	BioWare
