= Humankind (video game) =

2021 video game

- Developer: Amplitude Studios
- Publisher: Sega
- Directors: Romain de Waubert; Jean-Maxine Moris; Benoît Humbert
- Producer: Laurent Lemoine
- Designers: Balthazar Auger; William Dyce; Maxence Voleau
- Programmers: Éric Audinet; Florian Bruihart
- Artists: Corinne Billon; Aurélien Rantet
- Writers: Jeffrey Spock; Steve Gaskell; Bridget Behrmann
- Composer: Arnaud Roy
- Engine: Unity
- Platforms: Microsoft Windows; Stadia; macOS; PlayStation 4; PlayStation 5; Xbox One; Xbox Series X/S
- Release: Windows, Stadia; 17 August 2021; macOS; 3 November 2021; PS4, PS5, Xbox One, Xbox Series X/S; 22 August 2023
- Genre: 4X
- Modes: Single-player, multiplayer

Humankind is a turn-based strategy 4X video game by Amplitude Studios and published by Sega. The game was released for Microsoft Windows and Stadia in August 2021, for macOS in November 2021, and for PlayStation and Xbox consoles in August 2023. It received generally favorable reviews. A sequel, titled Humankind 2, is set to be released in 2027.

== Gameplay ==
Military units in Humankind can take advantage of terrain.

Humankind is a 4X game comparable to the Civilization series. Players lead their civilization across six major eras of human civilization, starting from the nomadic age, directing how the civilization should expand, developing cities, controlling military and other types of units as they interact with other civilizations on the virtual planet, randomly generated at the start of a new game. A distinguishing feature of Humankind is that within each of the eras, the player selects one of ten civilization types based on historical societies; this selection offers both bonuses and penalties to how the player can build out the civilization. Because a player can select different civilizations as templates to build upon, there exist potentially one million different civilization patterns that a player can ultimately develop.

Building out cities follows a similar model from Amplitude's Endless Legend game, a continent in Humankind will have multiple territories on it, and the player will only be able to build one city in that territory. Over time, they can expand that city, adding farms and other outlying resources as well as more dense urban areas closer to the city center. This allows the creation of large metropolises within each territory. Players may also need to engage in combat with enemy forces. When this occurs, the game uses a tactical role-playing game approach for detailed resolution of these battles, giving the player a chance to take advantage of terrain and special abilities of their units. Within these skirmishes, battles can only last for three combat turns before the game returns to the overworld, so that drawn-out wars can occur across multiple years at the overworld scale.

During the game, the players gain resources for their civilization, similar to Endless Legend, which includes food, industry, gold, science, and influence; each of these can be spent to speed up production, advance technology, or as trade goods with other cultures. Humankind also includes Fame, which is earned by feats within the game, for example, accumulating influence or gold, destroying units, being the first civilization to discover certain technologies, or build world wonders. Fame is a persistent measure of a civilization's relative success compared to other civilizations, and can impact later decisions in the game. Unlike games like Civilization where there can be multiple victory conditions, victory in Humankind is based solely on the Fame score after a pre-determined number of turns, or other events that trigger end-game. Humankind will include certain persons and events based on historical records that the player will interact with.

== Development and release ==
Amplitude Studios has had a history of prior 4X games based on its Endless science fiction setting, including Endless Space and Endless Legend. The studio considers Humankind to be their magnum opus of their previous titles, and something that they have wanted to produce from the start, with their recent acquisition by Sega helping to make Humankind possible.

Humankind had been teased by Sega earlier in 2019, with the game formally announced during the August 2019 Gamescom. The game had an exclusive 7-day demo available on Stadia, starting on October 21, 2020. Amplitude held periods of open beta testing across late 2020 and early 2021, called "OpenDev" phases, giving players the opportunity to try limited scenarios and provide feedback for improving the game.

While the game was planned for an April 2021 release, Amplitude pushed the release into August 2021 to facilitate final polishing of the game. During this time, Amplitude announced they would not include Denuvo digital rights management software in the game. While they had intended to use Denuvo to help protect their game, data collected during the OpenDev phases found that Denuvo negatively impacted the performance of the game, and they opted to remove the software. It was initially scheduled to release on PlayStation 4, PlayStation 5, Xbox One, and Xbox Series X/S in November 2022 but was delayed indefinitely due to “unique porting challenges”, eventually releasing in August 2023.

The studio released two downloadable content packs for the game, namely the "Cultures of Africa" pack in January 2022, and "Cultures of Latin America" in June 2022. An expansion, titled Together We Rule, was released on November 9, 2022. It added new features concerning diplomacy and espionage, and introduced six additional cultures into the game.

== Reception ==
Reception

Aggregate score
Aggregator	Score
Metacritic	77/100

Review scores
Publication	Score
GamesRadar+	4.5/5
IGN	7/10
PC Gamer (US)	71/100
PCGamesN	8/10

Humankind received "generally favorable reviews", according to review aggregator platform Metacritic. It was nominated for Best Sim/Strategy Game at The Game Awards 2021.

IGN writer Leana Hafner felt the game fell short of its potential, stating "Humankind is an interesting but fairly safe riff on historical 4X that doesn't always rise to meet its potential." PC Gamer writer Fraser Brown enjoyed the process of watching civilizations grow, but felt that the gameplay was too numbers-focused and lacked the personality and narrative uniqueness of Amplitude's earlier works. Writing for Rock Paper Shotgun, Nate Crowley compared the game favorably to the Civilization series, but felt the game didn't allow for diplomatic or military playstyles, writing "In more games than not, I find I'm devoting the bare minimum effort to military action and diplomacy, since land development almost always represents a more efficient way of getting what I want".

Kotaku writer Luke Plunkett spoke positively of the player's ability to switch cultures mid-game, writing "I hate being locked into a certain playstyle before I've ever seen the map or my opponents in a game like this, so getting the chance to reroll my empire constantly throughout the game is probably Humankind's smartest new idea". Eurogamer writer Chris Tapsell wrote positively of the game's combat, but felt that the game's mechanics sacrificed fun for authenticity.

=== Sales ===
Humankind was the fourth best-selling video game in August 2021 in the US.
