= Dungeon of the Endless =

2014 video game

- Developer: Amplitude Studios (Note: Apogee developed by Playdigious.)
- Publishers: Amplitude Studios; Sega (current); Playdigious (Apogee)
- Engine: Unity
- Platforms: Windows, OS X, iOS, Xbox One, PlayStation 4, Nintendo Switch, Android
- Release: Windows, OS X October 27, 2014 iOS; August 20, 2015; Xbox One; March 16, 2016; PS4, Nintendo Switch; May 15, 2020; Android; March 16, 2021
- Genres: Roguelike, tower defense
- Modes: Single-player, multiplayer

Dungeon of the Endless is a roguelike tower defense game developed and published by Amplitude Studios. It is the third game of their loosely connected Endless series, which includes Endless Space and Endless Legend. It was released in October 2014 for Microsoft Windows and OS X, August 2015 for iOS, and for Xbox One in March 2016. The PlayStation 4 and Nintendo Switch ports were released in May 2020. A revamped version for iOS and Android devices, called Dungeon of the Endless: Apogee, was released in March 2021 by Playdigious. The game was added to the Epic Games Store Mobile in January 2025.

In the game, the player takes the role of the survivors of a prison spaceship, its escape pod having crashed to the surface of a strange planet. To escape, they must take an energy crystal through several floors, each floor filled with a number of dangerous creatures. To help, the player can have their survivors explore the randomly generated levels to collect resources as to enable power to various rooms and construct turrets to fend off the enemies when they move the crystal from its starting point to the elevator to the next floor.

A sequel, Endless Dungeon, was released on October 19, 2023.

== Gameplay ==
Dungeon of the Endless is a roguelike game, featuring procedurally generated levels and the notion of permadeath, so that each runthrough of the game is different. The game is based on directing the survivors of a prison spacecraft (crew, prisoners, and civilians alike), having crash-landed on a strange alien planet, through several levels as to achieve escape from the planet. At the start of each game, the player selects two characters with each character having different statistics such as health, attack, defense power, and movement speed, as well as a number of abilities. The player is able to control each character separately or in tandem by directing them to move to the various rooms on the current level or open doors on that level, as well as to initiate any special ability or to heal them. Otherwise, the characters will act autonomously such as fending off any enemies that enter the room to the best of their ability. On the first level of the game, the characters will start in the crashed escape pod with the power crystal, while on subsequent levels, they will start on the elevator that they took from the previous level.

The game plays out in primarily a turn-based manner, each turn marked when a new door on the level is opened. At the start of each turn, the player gains fixed amounts of three resources: Industry, Science, and Food. Industry is used primarily in the construction of turrets and resource generators; Science is used to research new types of turrets and generators, and Food is used to heal the characters, or increase their experience level which improves their statistics, and gives them new abilities. Certain rooms may have objects that can be scavenged for more of these resources. Furthermore, rooms will have Dust, which powers the crystal. As the crystal gains more power, the player can "activate" a limited number of continuous sets of rooms, allowing them to build resource generators and turrets on rooms which have been activated. Players can also deactivate a room at any time to reroute the power to a different room, disabling the turrets and generators in that room. Other rooms may feature item chests, shopkeepers, and research stations, or they may contain survivors that players can recruit to their party (up to 4 characters total).

Opening a new door may also cause monsters to appear, appearing at random rooms across the map in any room that is not activated or lacking its own power source. The monsters will attack both the party and the crystal; killing the creatures has a chance of creating more Dust to run the crystal. The characters will lose health with attacks and will die if it drops to zero, though once all newly spawned monsters are defeated, their health is fully restored. If the crystal is attacked, it will permanently lose Dust, and if this drops to zero, the crystal is destroyed and the game is over. During monster attacks, the player can freely move the characters around between open rooms to obtain the best tactical placement, such as fighting monsters alongside numerous turrets. Once any spawned monsters are defeated, the player can move characters about and build defenses freely until they opt to open the next door.

Once the exit point on the level has been found, the player then must have one character collect the crystal and carry it slowly from the start to the exit point, while other characters protect the carrier from hordes of monsters that appear at this point. If the crystal carrier dies, the game is over, but if all surviving players make it to the room with the exit point, the player advances to the next level. The goal of the game is to complete 12 of these levels, each with more difficult monsters that appear, with at least one character carrying the crystal to the final exit point.

A meta-game exists in that the player can unlock additional characters for starting the game by recruiting new characters they find on levels and either completing the game or three levels with that character alive. Additionally, by achieving certain goals, the player can unlock different gameplay modes, such as one where the characters will start off much stronger than the enemies but will not regain health once a monster wave is defeated, forcing them to rely on food, healing turrets or items to heal.

Though strictly single-player on PS4 and Switch, the PC and Xbox versions of the game also support online play with up to four players. Each player controls one character, and each gains separate resources on the opening of new doors. New characters can be recruited by one player if there is space in the party, which are then controlled by that player.

== Development ==
Dungeon of the Endless was developed by Amplitude Studios alongside the development of their expected flagship title Endless Legend; the team for Dungeon was kept small, about four to five people, and used a pixel-based art style to keep the project simple. Amplitude's co-founder Romain de Waubert de Genlis stated that while they were developing a deep, high-quality 4X-based game in Endless Legend, the concept of Dungeon came from "some crazy drinking evening", and instead of trying to approach the smaller title with crowdfunding, they sought additional funding to support the title.

Dungeon of the Endless was first released as an early access title on the Steam software store on December 11, 2013, and the full version was released on October 27, 2014. An iOS version was also developed and released on August 20, 2015. The title was released for the Xbox One on March 16, 2016. The PlayStation 4 and Nintendo Switch versions were released on May 15, 2020.

A free Team Fortress 2 based expansion was added in June 2015 for personal computers, adding in characters and items based on Team Fortress 2. An expansion called "Organic Matters" was also released in November, which included new playable characters, monsters, additional modules that can be built, a new endgame sequence, and support for controllers, and a separate content pack called "The Rescue Team" featuring three new playable-characters.

Playdigious developed an improved version of the mobile client for the game, called Dungeon of the Endless: Apogee, for iOS and Android devices, which includes the base game and all DLC packs, and was released as a premium title on March 15, 2021.

== Reception ==
Reception

Aggregate score
Aggregator	Score
Metacritic	PC: 79/100 iOS: 83/100; XONE: 78/100; NS: 75/100; PS4: 84/100

Review scores
Publication	Score
GameSpot	7/10
IGN	8.1/10
PC Gamer (US)	77/100
TouchArcade	4/5

Dungeon of the Endless has received generally positive reviews, comparing the title to other hybrid roguelike such as FTL: Faster Than Light. Some have criticized the game for having low replay value, in that once the players have succeeded to complete a runthrough of the game, they will likely have experienced all the hazards that the game presents, and while one can repeat the game with different characters to start, the experience will be mostly the same.

Dungeon of the Endless was named as an honorable mention in the Excellence in Design category for the 2015 Independent Games Festival awards. It also received nominations for Strategy/Simulation Game of the Year and Outstanding Achievement in Game Design by the Academy of Interactive Arts & Sciences during the 18th Annual D.I.C.E. Awards.
