= Endless Legend 2 =

- Developer: Amplitude Studios
- Publisher: Hooded Horse
- Platforms: Windows; PlayStation 5; Xbox Series X/S
- Release: September 17, 2026
- Genre: 4X
- Modes: Single-player, multiplayer

Endless Legend 2 is a 4X strategy game developed by Amplitude Studios and published by Hooded Horse. A sequel to Endless Legend (2014), the game was released through early access on September 22, 2025 for Microsoft Windows. The full game, alongside versions for PlayStation 5 and Xbox Series X/S, was released on September 17, 2026.

== Gameplay ==
Endless Legend 2 is a turn-based 4X video game in which a player chooses a faction, as they seek to establish an empire through exploration, conquest, diplomacy and research. The full game features six factions for players to choose from. As with the first game, it utilizes a hex-based grid to represent its map. Each faction has their own unique gameplay mechanics. For instance, the Aspects can spread coral spores to the hexes belonging to other factions, and use them to infest the minds of opponents. The game has nine victory conditions: score victory, domination victory (if the player successfully defeats all other factions militarily), and seven types of "narrative" victory conditions.

The game is set in an oceanic world named Saiadha. The map in the game is procedural generated at the beginning of a playthrough. Saiadha is affected by a natural phenomeonon named "tidefalls", in which ocean levels recede, opening up new areas for players to explore. Players establish camps to claim control over a region, and then expand them into cities using "influence". As players explore, they encounter units from other factions. They can choose to trade with them, absorb them into the player's factions, and dominate them completely in battle. Unlike its predecessor, combat is more involved, and players need to issue commands to unit and position them manually.

== Development ==
The game was developed by Amplitude Studios. Since Amplitude bought itself out from Sega and became an independent company in November 2024, it was unable to self-publish the game. CEO of Amplitude, Romain de Waubert de Genlis, approached Hooded Horse and negotiated a publishing deal with them in two weeks.

The "Tidefall" mechanic was designed to encourage late-game exploration, as Amplitude recognized that one common pitfall of 4X games is that players often stop exploring after the early game. The team decided against adding a mechanic that would see rising ocean levels reclaiming cities and destroying units, as they felt players would not appreciate their hard-earned efforts being destroyed easily. The game's combat system was drawn from Amplitude's previous work on Humankind.

Endless Legend 2 was announced in January 2025. The game was released through early access on September 22, 2025. The early access version of the game had four factions available for players. The game left early access on September 17, 2026. The game also launched on PlayStation 5 and Xbox Series X/S on the same date.

== Reception ==
Endless Legend 2 received "generally favorable" reviews according to Metacritic. Jonathan Bolding from PC Gamer wrote that "Endless Legend 2 is a magnificent example of why Amplitude is so loved by 4X fans", praising the game's visuals, factions, soundtracks, as well as the changing map.
