= Humankind 2 =

2027 video game

- Developer: Amplitude Studios
- Publisher: Amplitude Studios
- Director: Benoît Humbert
- Writer: Jeffrey Spock
- Platform: Windows
- Release: 2027
- Genre: 4X
- Modes: Single-player, multiplayer

Humankind 2 is a turn-based strategy 4X video game currently in development by Amplitude Studios. A sequel to Humankind (2021), the game will be released for Windows in 2027.

== Gameplay ==
Humankind 2 is a 4X game similar to its predecessor. Like its predecessor, players are able to select whichever civilizations to play as across six eras of human history, from the nomadic age to the modern day, ultimately deciding how their civilizations evolve over time. The game introduces a new system called First Tales, which are founding myths that affect the development of civilizations in-game.

Players can also choose to keep playing as the civilization they chose at the start of the game, unlike its predecessor. Every civilization also has a new culture tree, which provides bonuses related to the chosen civilization's history and culture. A new system called Adaptations is introduced. Adaptations provide bonuses depending on which biomes a city is located in on the world map. For example, a city in the desert can adopt methods to gather water and protect against the heat, while a city in the forest can specialize in hunting animals and foraging fruit. Players can also adopt advancements from other civilizations they interact with in-game through a system similar to acculturation.

== Development ==
Humankind 2 is currently being developed by Amplitude Studios. It was revealed at the 2026 Gamescom Opening Night Live with a live action trailer which was produced by Nu Boyana Film Studios, based in Sofia, Bulgaria. The game is set to be released for Windows in 2027.
