= Theatrhythm Final Bar Line =

2023 video game

- Developers: indieszero sAs
- Publisher: Square Enix
- Directors: Tetsuya Nomura; Masanobu Suzui; Tsukasa Okayasu
- Producer: Ichiro Hazama
- Artist: Atsuhiro Tsuchiya
- Series: Final Fantasy; Theatrhythm
- Engine: Unity
- Platforms: Nintendo Switch; PlayStation 4
- Release: February 16, 2023
- Genre: Rhythm
- Modes: Single-player, multiplayer

Theatrhythm Final Bar Line (Note: Japanese: シアトリズム ファイナルバーライン, romanized: Shiatorizumu Fainaru Bā Rain) is a 2023 rhythm video game developed by indieszero and sAs and published by Square Enix for the Nintendo Switch and PlayStation 4. It is the fifth entry in the Theatrhythm sub-series of the Final Fantasy series. Its gameplay is mechanically similar to prior entries in the series, involving players' timing inputs to various pieces of themed music.

As the title Final Bar Line indicates, it is the final installment in the Theatrhythm series. With a development period of approximately two years, the game was designed to appeal to both casual and hardcore players. It features 505 tracks, including the main and spin-offs of Final Fantasy titles and other Square Enix games. The game's design was influenced by previous entries in the series, including Nintendo 3DS titles Curtain Call (2014) and Theatrhythm Dragon Quest (2015) and the arcade game Theatrhythm Final Fantasy: All-Star Carnival (2016), with a focus on accessibility and engaging gameplay as well as an enhanced role-playing element.

Final Bar Line received positive reviews. Critics praised the idea of the fusion of Final Fantasy and rhythm gameplay and recommended the title to fans of Final Fantasy or rhythm gamers. The extensive and diverse track library was a highlight, and the beatmaps, which balanced accessibility for beginners and challenge for hardcore players, were particularly praised. However, the role-playing elements and the removal of the stylus control received mixed reviews.

== Gameplay ==
A Battle Music Stage (BMS) where notes move from left to trigger marks on the right. In the background, chibi-styled characters battle against enemies.

Theatrhythm Final Bar Line uses the same core mechanics as its predecessors in the Theatrhythm series. Players are tasked with inputting the correct commands when the colored circles, known as triggers, move across the screen and line up with the white stationary circles, known as trigger marks. Each trigger requires different player input depending on their types: Red triggers demand a single press of any button; yellow arrowed triggers require an analog stick to be flicked in the direction of the arrow on the trigger; and green bar triggers require buttons with a sustained hold. If a green trigger is also attached to an arrow, it requires a button to be held alongside the analog stick in the arrow's direction. As a home console title on Nintendo Switch and PlayStation 4, Final Bar Line no longer supports touchscreen control originally implemented by its Nintendo 3DS predecessors; instead, some new patterns, such as dual-button presses, were introduced.

There are 385 songs in the standard release, with additional purchasable songs raising the total to 505. While predominantly from the Final Fantasy series, including main titles, spin-offs, and mobile titles, with a portion from other Square Enix titles. Tracks—referred to as Music Stages—are designed into three types: BMS (Battle Music Stages), FMS (Field Music Stages) and EMS (Event Music Stages). The experiences in BMS or EMS are similar to those in Guitar Hero or other classic rhythm games, with notes scrolling from left to right or top to bottom along four fixed linear tracks. FMS, while similar to BMS in that notes move from left to right, features only one track and special bar notes. These bar notes shift up and down, requiring players to manipulate a joystick to follow these movements and simultaneously hold down a button. In BMS and FMS, the backgrounds display Chibi-style characters and enemies, while EMS features a video clip from the corresponding Final Fantasy title. Each song has three or four difficulty levels: while Basic, Expert, and Ultimate are for all songs, Supreme, the most challenging level, is available only for around a third of the tracks. In addition to the Standard gameplay style, players can choose from two alternations: the Simple style, which converts all notes to single-button inputs, and the Pair style, where two players share notes in cooperation.

Final Bar Line also incorporates light role-playing game elements, similar to those found in Final Fantasy titles. Before playing a song, players can edit their party by assigning up to four characters from Final Fantasy titles. There are 104 characters from different Final Fantasy games, with each character having their own type (such as physical, magic, and healing), level, statistics, and abilities, and every character can be assigned up to three abilities. During stages, the party automatically battles with enemies when notes are triggered. The damage value is related to how accurately players hit the note; missing a note will cause the character to be attacked, resulting in a loss of HP. If all characters lose all their HP, the track is aborted, and the result is failure. On the other hand, if the song is cleared, the party members earn experience points to level up, and players may receive various items that can aid in battles, as well as a collection card featuring characters, enemies, or scenes. In addition, there are summonstones that can be equipped by the party, which can automatically summon a monster to deal significant damage to enemies.

Final Bar Line featured three modes: Series Quests, Music Stages, and Multi Battle. Series Quests is the basic approach mode in which players unlock new elements. A title contains multiple stages, with most having around a dozen. There are 29 titles corresponding to various Final Fantasy entries. Each stage features quests, which players can obtain rewards for completing. Quests range from incorporating certain characters into their party, reaching enough scores, to defeating a boss. To finish the last type of quest, players may use tactical strategies, such as including a magic-type character to exploit the boss's weakness. By clearing a title, players can unlock songs and characters and obtain a key to access other locked titles. Songs that have been unlocked can be freely played in the Music Stages mode to achieve the highest scores. Another mode is Multi Battle, where up to four players can be accommodated per room to achieve the highest score.

== Development and release ==
The double bar line, or final bar line, symbolizing the conclusion of a composition, appears in the game logo.

Theatrhythm Final Bar Line was developed by indieszero and sAs. As with previous titles in the Theatrhythm series, Ichirō Hamuza, a staff member of Square Enix, served as a producer; Masanobu Suzui, the president of indieszero, served as the series director and handled general supervision and liaison duties. Tsukasa Okayasu, a veteran of the series development, served as the director and engaged in the development of battle system. The project commenced in early 2021, around the time the Windows version of Kingdom Hearts: Melody of Memory, a rhythm game in the Kingdom Hearts series, was finished. The development period spanned approximately two years, following indieszero's typical development cycle, though they had made some preparations.

Although Theatrhythm Final Fantasy: Curtain Call, the 2014 predecessor, hinted at being the last installment of the Theatrhythm Final Fantasy series, the developer stated that Final Bar Line, true to its name, will be the finale of that. The title Final Bar Line was inspired by the design of the user interface, which features five-line staffs, and was determined in the initial stages of development in consultation with Tetsuya Nomura, a Final Fantasy director. Unlike its predecessors, the term "Final Fantasy" was removed. This decision followed Nomura's suggestion to avoid having two "final" words; on the other hand, despite predominantly featuring songs from the Final Fantasy series, the developers believed it was time to establish Theatrhythm as its brand. As the final installment in the series, the developers expressed their hope that it "can be enjoyed for a decade."

=== Design ===
The developers noticed the engagement from players with the 2014 Nintendo 3DS predecessor, Theatrhythm Final Fantasy: Curtain Call, especially in its versus mode. Based on the development experience with the 2016 arcade title Theatrhythm Final Fantasy: All-Star Carnival, the developers recognized that although arcades excel at showcasing rhythm elements, they are less suit for supporting role-playing experiences. Drawing from their experience with the 2016 arcade title Theatrhythm Final Fantasy: All-Star Carnival, they recognized arcades are good at showcasing rhythm elements while less adept at supporting role-playing experiences. While developing Melody of Memory, they also gained proficiency in developing rhythm games using the Unity engine. Additionally, the team received petitions from players requesting a home console version of the Theatrhythm series. Consequently, the developers concluded that it was time to develop a home console title of Theatrhythm.

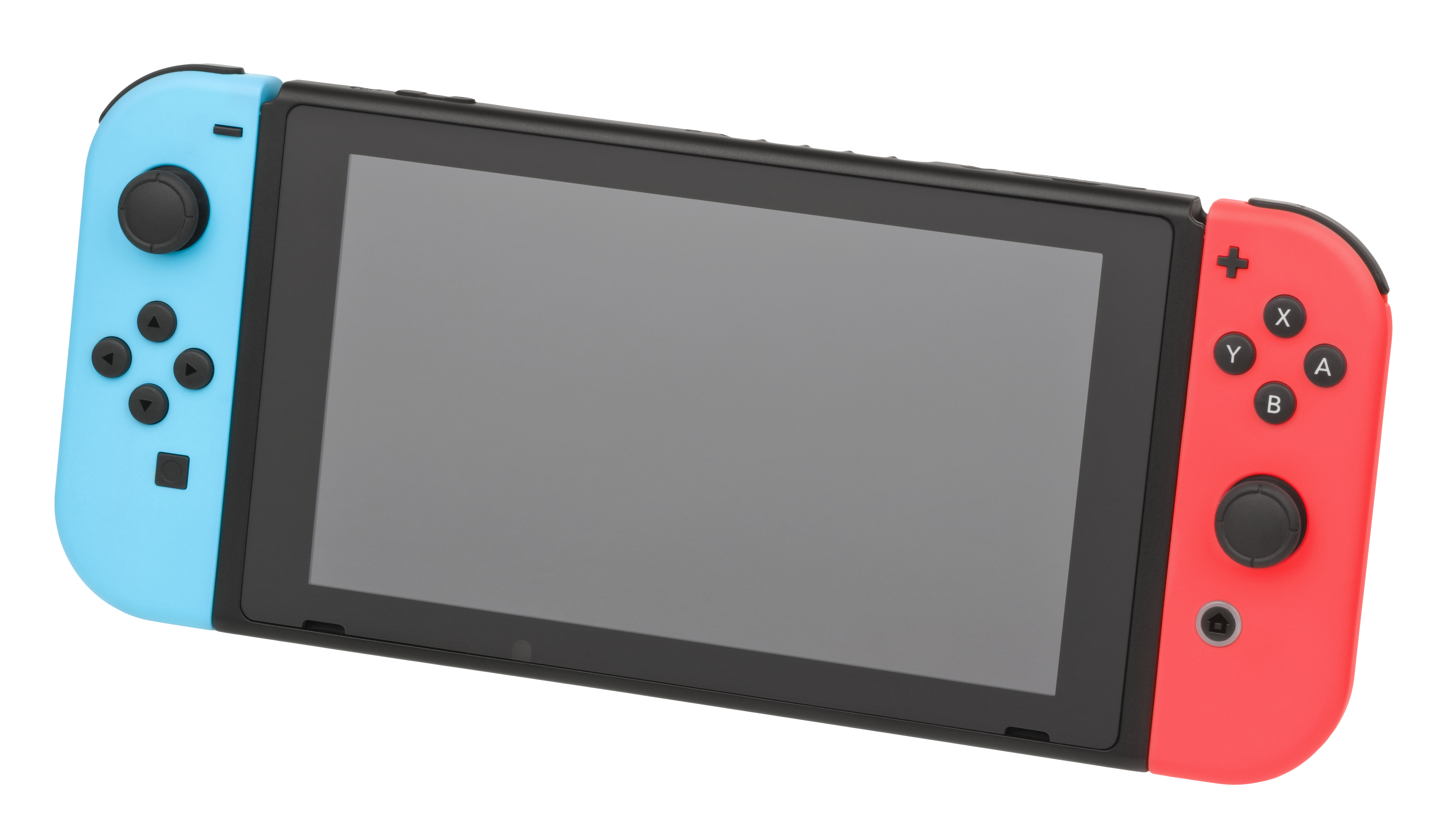
Leveraging the dual joysticks of PlayStation 4 and Nintendo Switch controllers, Final Bar Line features a mechanic that allows simultaneous flipping.

Curtain Call featured touchscreen and button controls, whereas the arcade version and Melody of Memory only supported button controls. The developers referenced both the 3DS and the arcade title to adapt: incorporating simultaneous pressing or two-direction triggers from All-Star Carnival while ensuring the accessibility for Curtain Call players. FMS in Final Bar Line is also based on the arcade game, but wave long bars were also adjusted with reference to Curtain Call. There was an initial consideration for Final Bar Line to retain the touchscreen, though the idea was eventually dropped. Unlike the pressure-sensitive touchscreen of the 3DS, it is a challenge to distinguish between touch and swipes on the Nintendo Switch's capacitive touchscreen. There is a significant change regarding the EMS in Final Bar Line. In its predecessor on the Nintendo 3DS, the trigger mark follows variable-speed movement like a conductor's wand, which received criticism. For Final Bar Line, the developers drew inspiration from Theatrhythm Dragon Quest and Melody of Memory, where notes drop directly from top to bottom.

While positioned as a sequel to Curtain Call, Final Bar Line is also designed to appeal to hardcore players of the arcade title. To ensure enjoyment for both novices and enthusiasts of rhythm games, the difficulty of the musical scores was designed to span a wide range. Beatmaps for Basic or Expert difficulty levels are designed with "easy to play" in mind, with strategies such as holds instead of presses, minimizing simultaneous actions, and ensuring ample spacing between notes. While for the technical charts of Ultimate and Supreme difficulty levels, designers approach the task with the concept of "carving out the score from the music". For instance, placing an up or down arrow note when the melody ascends or descends—even simply pressing is challenging enough—or incorporating double taps or flips during the climax or conclusion of a piece. Initially, the charts created by the team tended to be challenging due to their familiarity with rhythm games. However, during the later stages of development, team members less experienced in rhythm games highlighted this problem. Consequently, the developers reviewed and revised the charts accordingly.

While role-playing elements allow players who are less skilled in rhythm games to progress by strengthening their character party and pairing the skills of their characters, the developers aimed to further enrich the role-playing elements of the game. This includes displaying damage values, adding elemental properties such as fire or water, assigning resistances and weaknesses to enemies, and introducing abnormal statuses that affect both players and enemies. The design of strong bosses and an endless mode encourages players to level up their characters to face these challenges. Moreover, they introduce occasional battles in FMS to recall the emotions of players as they wander in the world of the original title.

The game features characters and monsters in chibi style, which were drawn by Monster Octopus, the veteran character designer of the Theatrhythm series. The design process for the enemy character Ardyn from Final Fantasy XV left a strong impression on the artist, as understanding the structure of Ardyn's clothing was challenging, while balancing the visual impact of the character and his weapons took an amount of time. While the logos of previous Theatrhythm titles were designed by Monster Octopus, the logo for Final Bar Line was illustrated by Yoshitaka Amano, the primary logo designer for the Final Fantasy series. The developer commissioned Amano to design a logo featuring a Moogle violinist performing and surrounded by characters playing various instruments, along with a backdrop of a five-line staff with musical notes. After several months, they received the completed artwork. Final Bar Line is the first Theatrhythm title to feature an opening movie. With the video's massive transitions matching the fast-paced music, Suzui aims to boost players' motivation and attract the interest of store shoppers and online video viewers. The ending movie adheres to the series' formula; it features a skit that showcases a variety of characters and monsters.

=== Track library ===
Including edition-exclusive tracks and downloadable contents (DLCs), Final Bar Line featured a collection of 505 tracks. Among these are 385 standard songs, 15 numbered titles and their sequels, as well as spin-offs like Type-0 and mobile titles such as Mobius and Record Keeper. In terms of numbers, this is 167 more than its predecessor, Curtain Call. 27 tracks, including "Eyes on Me" from Final Fantasy VIII and "To Zanarkand" from Final Fantasy X, are exclusive to the Deluxe editions. 93 songs are downloadable, which include other Square Enix titles such as SaGa, Live A Live, Mana, The World Ends with You, Nier, Chrono, Octopath Traveler, and Xenogears, as well as Final Fantasy XVI, which was released after Final Bar Line. Initially, information indicated that there were 502 tracks, but three were later added to the Final Fantasy XVI package.

The team compiled an extensive list of tracks and subsequently deliberated on selecting the track library. The order of consideration is as follows: first the main Final Fantasy titles, then the Final Fantasy spin-offs, and the latest Square Enix titles. Factors such as popularity, recency, suitability for rhythm gameplay, and equilibrium among titles were taken into account during the selection process. Additionally, the team referenced survey data from the arcade Theatrhythm title. Final Fantasy XIV, an MMORPG with a decade of operation and a thousand tracks, significantly contributed 33 tracks to the song library. When selecting songs for downloadable content, around two-fifths of the candidate songs were from the SaGa series, partly due to staff's preferences. For each pack in the DLCs, there is at least one brand-new song that was not included in Curtain Call or All-Star Carnival. Regarding the absence of the Square Enix series Dragon Quest and Kingdom Hearts, the developer stated that the two have their games to focus on. Due to the worldwide release of Final Bar Line, copyright concerns were a consideration. Negotiations for the copyright of "Eyes on Me" by Faye Wong took a year, and some other tracks could not be included due to unresolved copyright issues.

=== Release and marketing ===
Final Bar Line was revealed in Nintendo Direct on September 13, 2022, as a title for the 35th anniversary of Final Fantasy. The game was scheduled for release on February 16, 2023, for the Nintendo Switch and PlayStation 4, aligning with the anniversary of the original Theatrhythm. The demo version was released on February 1, 2023. Players can access 30 tracks with all difficulty levels and use 30 characters, each with limited experience levels. The play record can be transferred to the full version of the game. Suzui explains that for a game that without a story, it is beneficial to shorten the time between its unveiling and its release. Releasing a demo version just two weeks prior is an effective strategy to maintain player interest.

The title was released on February 16, 2023. On February 18, Square Enix hosted a livestream event featuring gameplay by Hamuza and commentary by Suzui. They were accompanied by guests, including Final Fantasy composers Nobuo Uematsu, Yoko Shimomura, and Masayoshi Soken, as well as producer Yoshinori Kitase, to chat about the music in the series.

There are three editions of Final Bar Line: the standard edition, the Digital Deluxe Edition, and the Premium Digital Deluxe Edition. There are three season passes, each containing several song packs. These packs, each containing several songs, were released approximately two to three weeks apart. The first pack was released with the launch of the game. The last addition, the Final Fantasy XVI pack from season pass three, was released on November 1, 2023. The developer said that there are no further season passes planned. Regarding the business model, the developer stated that while a subscription model similar to that used by Just Dance is modern, they believe console games are intended for one-time payment. Players who enjoy the game have the option to purchase downloadable contents.

== Reception ==
Reception

Aggregate scores
Aggregator	Score
Metacritic	(NS) 87/100 (PS4) 87/100
OpenCritic	92% recommend (Note: Based on 88 reviews)

Review scores
Publication	Score
Destructoid	8.5/10
Famitsu	35/40
Game Informer	9/10
GameSpot	8/10
Hardcore Gamer	4/5
IGN	9/10
Nintendo Life	9/10
Nintendo World Report	9.5/10
Push Square	8/10
Shacknews	9/10
TouchArcade	5/5
VG247	4/5

Theatrhythm Final Bar Line received "generally favorable" reviews according to review aggregator website Metacritic; and got a 92% recommendation rating from OpenCritic. In Japan, four critics from Famitsu gave the game a total score of 35 out of 40. The overall idea, the fusion of Final Fantasy with rhythm gameplay, was acclaimed by reviews. While GameSpot described the gameplay system as "approachable yet deceptively challenging", Destructoid praised it for doing "a fantastic job of translating songs from the ears to the fingers". Reviews recommend the Final Bar Line to fans of Final Fantasy, rhythm games, or both. The Gamer called the game "the platonic ideal of fanservice", while VG247 found it to be a serviceable title with a risk-averse nature.

The design of track charts was generally well received. Reviews found that the beatmaps were precise. Game Bonfire's review noted that in most songs, the notes are precisely synchronized with the track's rhythm, resulting in a feeling of satisfaction and excitement. Reviewers also highlighted that the game was accessible to both newcomers and hardcore players: beginners could easily clear songs in Simple Style, while dedicated players could challenge themselves with the newly introduced Supreme difficulty. Nintendo Life praised the game's accessibility setting, including adjustable note speed, background animation dimming, and an alternative color scheme for colorblind players. The reception of the new EMS format was mixed: VG247 praised the new gameplay, stating it was ideal for enjoying background video clips; GameSpot, while agreeing with this, wished the game had retained the unique scattered note design of its predecessors.

Reviewers of Final Bar Line noticed the absence of touch functionality, a feature available in its Nintendo 3DS predecessors. Several critics complained about this omission, particularly the use of the sticks for managing the up-and-down movement of long bars. Push Square described the control with sticks as being either "boring" or "awkward", while VG247 liked the conductor-like feeling of using a stylus. However, other reviewers found that the control scheme could be adapted, and that this shift might even make the game better than its predecessors. Nintendo Life believed that "it can take some getting used to", and "once the controls clicked for us, we felt like a maestro". The Gamer agreed with this, and echoing IGN, stated that the use of the second stick made the game more challenging.

The introduction of the Series Quests mode was generally acclaimed by reviewers. Game Rant called the mode the "main attraction", and said that although the unlocking mechanics initially restrict players' song choices, this limitation ultimately encourages them to explore a variety of songs. Reviews also called the mode a "nostalgic journey", offering a "fun trip through the series' history". Nintendo Life and Game Bonfire further stated that quests pay homage to the corresponding titles, evoking empathy in players. For example, the task in Crisis Core's "The Price of Freedom" requires players to defeat 30 SOLDIER enemies, similar to what Zack does in the finale of the original game. However, IGN was dissatisfied with the fact that "there isn't a story or anything beyond the music itself to keep you hooked".

Reviewers commented on the light role-playing elements. Several reviewers considered this system to have a strategic impact on gameplay, giving it a Final Fantasy flavor. IGN believed that the strategic arrangement of party members could determine the success in both quest completion and multiple battles. Game Rant explained that, although character skills may initially appear useless, they eventually helped players defeat bosses before the song finished. The Gamer stated that the role-playing elements provide players with the motivation to unlock characters and are essential for Endless Mode. Push Square, said that while the role-playing elements could be ignored, they make Final Bar Line a Final Fantasy game. However, some critics deemed this automatic and passive feature not crucial, even "superficial". While Nintendo Life noted it's "not an essential" but "fun", Destructoid commented that "once you have a healer or two in your party, there's no real reason to think about that system ever again".

Reviewers praised Final Bar Line for its extensive track library, especially noting its significant addition to the previous titles. Destructoid remarked that, in comparison to Curtain Call's 221 songs and Melody of Memory's143 tracks, Final Bar Line has an "absurd amount of content". The coverage and diversity of tracks were also commended by critics, ranging from popular and famous songs to lesser-known titles such as Mystic Quest or Mobius, as well as remixes and adaptations of "Final Fantasy" songs. GameSpot additionally praised the game for its inclusion of a song by The Star Onions, the band of Final Fantasy composer Naoshi Mizuta, while The Gamer noted that there are five different versions of "Battle on the Big Bridge". However, Game Rant expressed their dissatisfaction and commented that repetitive songs were too similar, resulting in a tedious feeling. The reviewer also felt that a lot of great music was absent, and Mystic Quest, which was outstanding in music, received only a minor proportion. Some reviews felt it odd that there was a lack of Final Fantasy XIV: Endwalker or Final Fantasy Tactics Advance music. Critics also complained about the commercial strategy, as iconic tracks like "To Zanarkand" are exclusive to the Deluxe edition.

The Nintendo Switch version of Theatrhythm Final Bar Line was the sixth bestselling retail game during its first week of release in Japan, with 11,565 physical copies sold. The PlayStation 4 version sold 3,610 physical copies across Japan during the same week, making it the sixteenth bestselling retail game of the week in the country.
