= Kingdom Rush =

2011 video game

- Game logo
- Developer: Ironhide Game Studio
- Publisher: Armor Games
- Programmer: Pablo Realini
- Artist: Gonzalo Sande
- Platforms: Browser game iOS; Android; Windows macOS; Nintendo Switch; Xbox One; Linux
- Release: Browser; July 28, 2011; iOS; December 2011; Android; May 13, 2013; Windows, macOS; January 6, 2014; Linux; 10 March, 2014; Switch; July 30, 2020; Xbox One; January 24, 2023
- Genre: Tower defense game
- Mode: Single-player

Kingdom Rush is a 2011 tower defense game developed by Ironhide Game Studio and published by Armor Games. In the game's medieval fantasy setting, players take control of a general serving under King Denas of Linirea, who must defend the land from an onslaught of evil monsters. Each level is composed of a number of pre-set roads, which the player can place defensive towers around to fight off the approaching monsters. Slaying enemies gives the player gold, which they can use to buy new towers or upgrade existing ones to improve their capabilities.

Kingdom Rush was developed over the span of six months by the Uruguay-based developer Ironhide Game Studio. The studio was founded in 2010 by Álvaro Azofra, Pablo Realini and Gonzalo Sande, who conceived Kingdom Rush as their first major project after working on a number of minor Flash games. After seeing the success of tower defense games, the three decided to replicate the basic strategy of the genre, combining it with elements of other games they played in their youth.

Kingdom Rush was first released in July 2011 as a free browser game. Versions for iOS devices were released in December 2011, followed by ports to Android in May 2013, and Windows and macOS in January 2014. A later release for Nintendo Switch was published in July 2020, and the Xbox One version was released in January 2023. It was a financial success and received generally favorable reviews from critics, who praised the graphics and tower upgrades, with many considering it a standout tower defense game. After release, Ironhide Game Studio supported Kingdom Rush with a number of free content updates and expansions. The game's success incited plans to grow the video game industry of Uruguay and inspired Ironhide Game Studio to produce related media.

== Gameplay ==
Defensive towers attack enemies as they enter from the start of the road (bottom) to prevent them from reaching the end of the path (top).

Kingdom Rush is a tower defense game set in a medieval fantasy setting. Levels are composed of a number of pre-set roads that enemies march across, and the player must defeat them before they reach the end of the path and drain lives to cause a game over. To prevent enemies from reaching the end, the player must purchase defensive towers at set points around the road to attack any incoming monsters.

The player can choose between four types of towers to place: archers, mages, artillery, and barracks. Each tower type has its own distinct strengths, such as artillery being more effective against grouped monsters, archers better at targeting flying threats, and barracks training soldiers that attack in melee and slow down enemies. Slaying monsters gives the player gold, which they can use to buy more towers or upgrade existing ones. Each tower type can be improved three times before the player must choose between two final upgrades with their own distinct abilities. For example, the final upgrade for a mage tower could be either an "Arcane Wizard" that shoots magic beams and teleports monsters back down the road, or a "Sorcerer" that summons a defensive earth elemental and weakens enemy armor.

In addition to towers, the player can fight the monsters with two abilities that can be deployed anywhere in the level, and take time to recharge before they can be reused: a powerful meteor spell that deals damage in an area, and a reinforcement ability that summons soldiers to block and distract enemies. Furthermore, the player is also given control of a single hero unit, which is more powerful than typical soldiers, can be moved move freely around the level, and features its own distinct abilities. Completing levels in Kingdom Rush allows the player to unlock new hero options and earn a currency called "stars", which can be spent in exchange for permanent upgrades for towers and defenses. Additional stars can be earned through special challenges on already completed levels, which feature more difficult enemy placements and fewer resources.

=== Plot ===
The player takes the role of a general serving King Denas of Linirea. After being dispatched to fight outlaws reported around the city of Southport, the general discovers that the outlaw gangs are actually orc legions serving the evil wizard Vez'nan. Learning that Vez'nan has invaded Linirea, the general returns to the capital city and defends it from the enemy army, proceeding into the nearby mountains with the objective of defeating the wizard. Arriving at the Stormcloud Temple, the resident sorcerers use a spell to teleport the king's army into the wasteland near Vez'nan's tower. The general fights through the wasteland and reaches the tower, defeating Vez'nan and returning home in celebration. In a post-credits scene, a hooded figure discovers and claims Vez'nan's discarded wizard's staff.

== Development ==
Kingdom Rush was developed over the span of six months by the Uruguay-based developer Ironhide Game Studio. The studio had been founded in 2010 by Álvaro Azofra, Pablo Realini and Gonzalo Sande, who conceived Kingdom Rush as their first major project after working on a number of minor Flash games. After seeing the success of tower defense games, the three decided to replicate the basic strategy of the genre, combining it with elements of other games they played in their youth. The medieval theme was inspired by references of knights and wizards throughout popular media, in addition to the team's experiences as Dungeons & Dragons players.

The programming was managed by Realini, and Sande's art design focused on creating a detailed, cartoony style. The team received no feedback during the development process and had run out of money and savings by release. The initial Flash version of the game received one of the most favorable ratings on Kongregate and was a financial success. The studio brokered a deal with their marketer and publisher Armor Games for ports to mobile devices. Realini took charge of coding and programming the port for iOS, which was finished after four months. It reached the top charts of the App Store and attracting over 100 million downloads.

== Release ==
Kingdom Rush was first released on July 28, 2011, as a free browser game, becoming one of the most popular games on the Kongregate game portal within a few days of launch. Versions for iOS devices were released in December 2011, followed by ports to Android on May 17, 2013, and Windows and macOS on January 6, 2014. A later release for Nintendo Switch was published on July 30, 2020, followed by versions for Xbox One and Xbox Series X/S on January 24, 2023.

After release, Ironhide Game Studio supported Kingdom Rush with a number of free content updates and expansions. An update called "Winter Storm" was released on March 21, 2013, adding a harder difficulty mode, new hero options, and two levels centered around the player fighting against the troll warlord Ulguk-Hai. A new set of levels collectively called the "Burning Torment" campaign was introduced on October 3, 2013, adding two additional heroes, five new types of enemies, and a boss fight against Moloch the Archdevil. A free level called the Fungal Forest was released on December 19, 2013, alongside a new hero and a boss fight. An expansion composed of four levels and featuring eight new enemies was added for iOS on January 21, 2015, with the campaign centered around a battle against the evil Lord Blackburn and his undead army.

== Reception ==
Reception

Aggregate score
Aggregator	Score
Metacritic	iOS: 89/100

Review scores
Publication	Score
IGN	9.0/10
Pocket Gamer	4.5/5
TouchArcade	4.5/5

According to the review aggregate website Metacritic, Kingdom Rush received "generally favorable reviews" for its iOS version.

Critics considered Kingdom Rush to be a standout tower defense game, with reviewers calling it memorable, and "an instant classic". IGN and Paste applauded the graphics, believing that they set a lighthearted mood that complimented the gameplay. Pocket Gamer wrote that the visuals and sound effects created a "sense of fun" that prevented gameplay from becoming tedious or repetitive. Eurogamer further appreciated the art, writing that it acted as a distinct element of the game that complemented its upgrade systems.

Although reviewers found the structure of gameplay to follow familiar conventions of the tower defense genre, they highlighted the customization offered by the different upgrades. TouchArcade liked the strategic choices available to the player, calling the presentation of the upgrades modest, with their customization expansive in variety. The reviewer considered the upgrades to all have value, noting that game did not overtly coerce players into choosing a specific one. Similarly, IGN found the final upgrades demonstrated a level of utility beyond the four base tower options, and gave prudent players a distinct advantage.

The difficulty of Kingdom Rush was subject to commentary from reviewers, who considered the game challenging. TouchArcade found gameplay to be satisfying regardless of the chosen difficulty mode, and said that none of the challenges were frustrating. IGN agreed with this assessment, writing that none of the levels felt unfair, and were instead well-balanced and executed. Some reviewers said that the game's tough difficulty was offset by the easygoing tone and presentation of gameplay, Pocket Gamer shared in this viewpoint, calling the game "a rare combination of frustration and frivolity" that nonetheless remained fun. The reviewer concluded by saying that the game's combination of challenging mechanics with a lighthearted tone helped it stand out from the rest of the tower defense genre.

== Legacy ==
The success of Kingdom Rush prompted plans to help grow the games industry of Uruguay, which had a small number of developers and lacked a formal developer association at the time of release. Ironhide Game Studio later added in-app purchases to the game to help monetize the game's success. The team began development of a sequel called Kingdom Rush: Frontiers, which they decided to self-publish. Frontiers was planned to expand upon the narrative presented in the original game while presenting new upgrades for towers and skill trees for heroes. The franchise was further supported when the developers released comic books that built upon the story. Kingdom Rush: Frontiers was first released on June 6, 2013, for iOS, receiving "generally favorable reviews" according to Metacritic.

A prequel to the original game called Kingdom Rush: Origins was released for iOS and Android on November 20, 2014, featuring a story involving a nation of elves waging war against their ancient enemies. A fourth entry in the franchise called Kingdom Rush: Vengeance was released for iOS and Android on November 22, 2018. The story of Vengeance sees the player controlling the dark wizard Vez'nan and his army, helping them fight against elves, dwarves, and the playable characters of the previous three games. Major changes to gameplay mechanics in Vengeance include the removal of the two final upgrade options, and the addition of sixteen different tower types, of which the player can choose to use up to five during gameplay. Ironhide Game Studio released a spin-off title called Legends of Kingdom Rush on June 11, 2021, for iOS through Apple Arcade. Unlike the other entries in the series which are tower defense games, Legends is a turn-based strategy game.

A fifth tower defense game titled Kingdom Rush 5: Alliance was announced in 2024 and was released for iOS, Android, and PC on July 25, with preordering available on iOS on April 10. The story of Alliance takes place after Vengeance and Legends, where the forces of King Denas and Vez'nan ally themselves to face a powerful enemy. Towers and heroes in the game are based upon troops featured in both armies, and players take control of two hero units simultaneously. On October 9, 2025, Kingdom Rush Battles was released globally on iOS and Android. Battles is Ironhide's first multiplayer PvP spin-off. A sixth main game called Kingdom Rush 6: Genesis was launched on September 23, 2026. The story of Genesis involves the player using time travel to attempt to defeat Vez'nan.
