= Endless Space 2 =

2017 video game

- Developer: Amplitude Studios
- Publisher: Sega
- Engine: Unity
- Platforms: macOS; Windows
- Release: 18 May 2017
- Genres: Turn-based strategy, 4X
- Modes: Single-player, multiplayer

Endless Space 2 is a turn-based strategy 4X game developed by Amplitude Studios and published by Sega. It is the sequel to Endless Space, which was released in 2012. The game had been made available through Steam's early access program since October 2016. It was released on 18 May 2017, and received positive reviews.

== Gameplay ==
Endless Space 2 is set in a universe that was long ago dominated by a powerful race called the Endless. Inquisitive and dedicated, the Endless were able to make great advances in the fields of science, which culminated in them achieving virtualization, allowing them to upload their minds into machines and giving them eternal life. This created a great schism in their society, splitting it into two opposing factions, the Virtuals, who embraced electronic immortality, and the Concretes, who viewed it as an abomination. The quarrels quickly grew into an open war, called the Dust Wars, which essentially destroyed their society, leaving but a few splintered surviving individuals. Tens of thousands of years after the demise of the Endless, the galaxy is yet again thriving with life capable of interstellar travel, picking at the remains of the once great Endless empire. The player takes control of one of the 12 major factions, "each with their own asymmetrical gameplay, storyline, homeworlds, spaceships, heroes and technologies".

At the beginning of the game, the player can choose from one of the 12 predesigned factions, as well as create their own custom faction. They are then given control of a fledgling empire, which they must expand by conquering systems. Each system has up to 5 planets, with their own environments, climates, stats (i.e. production, food, etc.), and sometimes anomalies. Anomalies can be explored using an explorer ship, and give buffs or debuffs to the entire system. Planet stats determine how effective planets are at what, while environments determine whether a planet is colonizable or not. The ability to colonize different environments is unlocked through research. Each planet can also be given a specialization, which give buffs, with additional buffs being granted based on climate. Finally, the player can construct improvements to a system's infrastructure, with several powerful variants that can only be built once in the entire game. Players can explore and colonise systems utilizing ships, though initially restricted to star lanes, the player can unlock several other forms of travel via research.

Research is key to progressing through the game. It unlocks new constructions, ship hulls, weapons, modules, upgrades, tactics, system infrastructure, abilities and other items to give the player an advantage. The game has currently 10 factions (including the downloadable content). There are four different categories of research trees: military, science and technology, business and trade, and empire development. Each tree has five levels, which are only unlockable by researching different subjects in the level before. Politics are also important for different reasons. The game features a political system, which each faction has a certain affinity for, industrialists, scientists, militarists, pacifists, ecologists, and religious. All of which provide laws to provide buffs to the player, as well as one automatic law being enacted by the main party in power, becoming more potent over time from, established to entrenched. There are also different types of government, which can augment law effectiveness and how many parties can be in office at once. Increasing party support can be achieved by reaching certain technologies, building appropriate infrastructure, and performing certain actions (declaring war, building bunkers, and researching weapons increasing militarist party support being a good example).

In order to expand their empire, the player must colonize systems throughout their galaxy. They are also competing with various other empires, who are also attempting to win the game. The player can interact with them, by declaring war, sending tributes, or forming alliances. Each empire has their own territory, and different relationships with the player (i.e. Cold War, War, Wary, etc.). There are also minor civilizations, with whom players can improve their relationships to get them to send resources, or on whom they can declare war. They can also be assimilated into the player's empire if their relationship is good enough. Opposing empires can interact with these civilizations as well.

To fight against other empires, players require ships and ground troops. Players can engage in ship to ship battles against enemy fleets, with battles playing out automatically, fleets are pitted against each other with their relative effectiveness being determined by weapon and defense modules, the range of engagement being determined by the strategy card a player picks. Different battle tactics can be used, which give bonuses and change the range of engagement. Players can also retreat from battle, saving their ships at the cost of taking some damage. Players can also invade by sending their ground troops to fight against defenders for a system. The player's ground troops can be upgraded, and the player can decide what percentages of the army they make up. Replenishing ground troops requires manpower, a special resource, and each ship can only carry so many soldiers. Players can also weaken an enemy system's defenders by placing their fleets in orbit and besieging the enemy system, which decreases the number of enemy troops.

The player can design ships. There are three classes of ship hulls: small, medium, and large, which are unlocked as the player climbs the appropriate research tree. Larger hulls have more health, manpower capacity, and module slots, but require more resources and time to build, and take up more space in a fleet. Each ship has support and weapon modules, where players can equip certain weapons and buff-granting support modules. Each weapon has different stats and ranges. There are three ranges: short, medium, and long. Each weapon has a certain accuracy at certain ranges, with poor accuracy resulting many missed shots, lowering damage. Certain weapons have special properties; for example, kinetic weapons, while ineffective at long range, can attack incoming missiles, fighters, and bombers. Beam weapons, on the other hand, have relatively low damage output but are unaffected by range, making them incredibly consistent.

== Development ==
The game was made available through Steam's early access program on 6 October 2016, followed by its full release on 19 May 2017.

The game received its third major update on 23 March 2018. It added the Vaulter civilization, pirate bases, and an Early Access version of multiplayer mode along with several new visual elements.

== Reception ==
Endless Space 2 received "generally favorable" reviews upon release according to review aggregator Metacritic.

=== Accolades ===
Year	Award	Category	Result	Ref
2017	Golden Joystick Awards	PC Game of the Year	Nominated	
2017	Ping Awards	Best PC Game	Nominated	
2017	Ping Awards	Best Graphics	Nominated	
2017	Ping Awards	Best Soundtrack	Nominated	
2018	21st Annual D.I.C.E. Awards	Strategy/Simulation Game of the Year	Nominated	
