= Theatrhythm Final Fantasy =

2012 video game

- European cover art
- Developers: Square Enix 1st Production Department indieszero sAs
- Publisher: Square Enix
- Director: Masanobu Suzui
- Producer: Ichiro Hazama
- Artist: Atsuhiro Tsuchiya
- Series: Final Fantasy; Theatrhythm
- Platforms: Nintendo 3DS, iOS
- Release: 3DS: JP: February 16, 2012; NA: July 3, 2012; AU: July 5, 2012; EU: July 6, 2012; iOS: WW: December 13, 2012
- Genre: Rhythm
- Modes: Single-player, multiplayer

Theatrhythm Final Fantasy (Note: Japanese: シアトリズム ファイナルファンタジー, romanized: Shiatorizumu Fainaru Fantajī) is a 2012 rhythm video game developed by indieszero and sAs and published by Square Enix for the Nintendo 3DS. Based on the Final Fantasy video game franchise, the game involves using the touch screen in time to various pieces of music from the series. An iOS version was released in December 2012. A sequel, Theatrhythm Final Fantasy: Curtain Call, was released in 2014. A third game based on the Dragon Quest series, Theatrhythm Dragon Quest, was released in 2015. An arcade game, Theatrhythm Final Fantasy: All-Star Carnival, was released in 2016. A second sequel, Theatrhythm Final Bar Line, was released on February 16, 2023, for Nintendo Switch and PlayStation 4.

== Gameplay ==
A fight in Theatrhythm featuring a four-member party fighting the boss Gilgamesh. The top right shows Cloud's stats and moves, while the yellow light below indicates the following character who attacks is Tidus.

Theatrhythm Final Fantasy is a rhythm video game. Players take control of four Final Fantasy characters, and select a game from the first Final Fantasy to XIII. Each game has three stages: field, battle, and event. Each stage features different game mechanics than the others; once a stage is completed, the characters level up. The difficulty level can be changed in order to make it appealing to "beginners and rhythm masters alike". Throughout the game, players can unlock music and movie scenes. The gameplay requires players to tap on the screen in correct spots to the beat of the music playing. Within the main game section "Series Mode", there are 3 unique stage styles: Field (Overworld) Music, Battle Music, and Event (Dramatic) Music, as well as the option to play through the opening and ending themes.

- The Opening and Ending Theme segments involve simply tapping the screen in time with music notes as they move into the center of a crystal on screen.
- Field Music Sequences (FMS) are a side-scrolling rhythm game, as the screen moves from right-to-left, and a player must either tap a note, slide the stylus in a direction, or hold the stylus down while following a waving line on the touch screen. The object is to reach the end of the stage before the music ends, where another character is waiting to give the player an item. Playing well causes the character to speed up, while missing will cause the character to fall down. There is an opportunity to ride a chocobo in each level for a speed boost.
- Battle Music Sequences (BMS) are mock-battles, with the player tapping notes correctly to do damage to the enemies onscreen. The objective is to kill all the enemies and eventually a boss character during the duration of the song. The notes come in from left-to-right. In this mode, the players must tap a note, swipe the stylus in a direction, or hold the stylus down for a long note. Good timing causes character attacks to be more powerful and can also trigger special abilities. The player has the opportunity to perform one summon attack each battle.
- Event Music Sequences (EMS) includes a set of cutscenes from the Final Fantasy game of choice, and will play the scene onscreen in the background. Controls are similar to the Field sections, albeit players now follow the cursor as it moves around the screen. Clearing silver and gold sections extends the level's song. Characters' stats and abilities other than Hit Points do not affect these stages

There is also a "Challenge Mode" that allows the player to choose the Battle, Overworld, or Dramatic music from a Final Fantasy game that they have cleared the normal difficulty of in Series Mode. The player then plays these one stage at a time, instead of in succession as in Series Mode. If an A rank or better is received on a song, a higher difficulty is unlocked. Unlocking a higher difficulty for all three songs from a Final Fantasy Game will unlock that difficulty in Series Mode. Within Challenge Mode, there is also a "no fail" practice option for each stage.

Lastly for the music section of the game, there is a "Chaos Shrine" mode. There are a total of 99 levels, with two stages per level - a field music followed by a battle music. For each level, there are three possible bosses, with each boss dropping three items for a total of nine potential item drops per level. These items are usually rarer items or crystals needed to unlock additional characters. If one scores high enough in the first field music stage, a sign will appear indicating they will go to "Boss 2 or 3", who will have better item drops. These levels have a difficulty level between the 2nd and 3rd levels from Challenge Mode. Additionally, Chaos Shrine contains songs from Final Fantasy games not featured in other areas of the game (for example, Mambo de Chocobo). The game also features downloadable content, allowing players to purchase new songs and stages from the Nintendo eShop.

== Plot ==
The game follows the events of the gods Chaos and Cosmos, a similar plot to Dissidia Final Fantasy for the PlayStation Portable. The space between the two is called Rhythm, which gives birth to a crystal that controls music. Chaos causes the crystal to become disrupted, and the only way to return it to normal is to increase a music wave known as "Rhythmia" (known as "Rhythpo" in the Japanese version). As such, various characters from the Final Fantasy universe are brought together in order to harness the power of Rhythmia.

== Development and release ==
Theatrhythm Final Fantasy was proposed by Square Enix's Ichiro Hazama after working in the film Final Fantasy VII: Advent Children. It was originally envisioned for the Nintendo DS but development faced difficulties due to the console's limitations. Upon seeing the Nintendo 3DS, Hazama once again gave his idea to his superior Tetsuya Nomura, which resulted in the production for the game on the Nintendo 3DS. While the work title in the proposal file was Final Fantasy in Music, the current title, Theatrhythm, was suggested by Nomura. Development was split between independent developers indieszero and Tokyo-based developer sAs.

For the music selection, the Square Enix staff made a music survey during development of Dissidia Final Fantasy although most of the chosen songs were from Final Fantasy VII. All the songs were included in their original versions with the exception of the "Gurugu Volcano" from the first Final Fantasy which is based on the PlayStation release since the original version was shorter. The idea of using the gods Chaos and Cosmos from Dissidia was proposed by Nomura as both Hazama and he had worked in such game and wanted to continue using them.

The trademark "Theatrhythm" was filed near the end of E3 2011 by Square Enix. Theatrhythm Final Fantasy was officially announced for release exclusively on the Nintendo 3DS handheld game console in the Japanese manga anthology Weekly Shōnen Jump. The game was originally announced for release only in Japan. Square Enix Japan created an official website to promote the game. Rumours came up that Theatrhythm Final Fantasy would be developed by Jupiter, but was later confirmed on the official website that it would be developed by Indieszero. The character and monster designs are designed by MonsterOctopus, who also designed the Kingdom Hearts avatars found in Kingdom Hearts Mobile and Re:Coded.

== Reception ==
Reception (Nintendo 3DS)

Aggregate score
Aggregator	Score
Metacritic	78/100

Review scores
Publication	Score
Edge	6/10
Eurogamer	7/10
Famitsu	36/40
Game Informer	8/10
GameSpot	7.5/10
GameTrailers	8/10
IGN	8.5/10
Nintendo Power	8/10
Nintendo World Report	9/10
Slant Magazine	3.5/5

According to Metacritic, the Nintendo 3DS version of Theatrhythm Final Fantasy received a "generally favorable". Theatrhythm tapped into the extensive legacy of Final Fantasy music, which had a history of twenty-five years, and some critics wondered the long wait for a Final Fantasy music game. The fusion of rhythm gameplay and role-playing elements was found to be interesting and nostalgic, though the role-playing sector has limited impact on the actual enjoyment. Reviews recommended Theatrhythm Final Fantasy for Fantasy Fantasy fans seeking a nostalgia trip through the series.

Curtain Call's core rhythm gameplay was applauded by critics for its touching gameplay, with GameTrailers called it a feeling of "playing conductor". Commenters also believe the stages were paired with the original atmosphere, noting FMS and BMS reflected planted and exciting moods respectively, while EMS evoked a reminiscence. The game's difficulty level was praised for its wide range, being accessible for beginners but hard to master. Nonetheless, Slant found the game for a lack of polish, and NWR found its occasional issues and suggested the addition of button control.

Some reviews considered the fusion of role-playing elements as an innovation that touched on nostalgia, but some reviews also found it not well-rounded as it hardly affected gameplay. Although agreed that the role-playing machines may had been helpful for completing difficult songs, but they felt the four-person party a "visual aid" for providing the "illusion of success": players could rely on their rhythm skills, rendering the character leveling and party arrangement aspects less impactful.

The game's opening was boring, which was compared to dull beginnings of role-playing games by IGN, but the later-unlocked Chaos Shrine was interesting. Reviews lauded for its challenging and unlockable elements. Polygon commented that defeating Shrine bosses would cost skilled music gamers a considerable time, while Edge described the challenge of "slowly unlocking harder, more obscure songs in the Chaos Shrine" as "the game's real challenge". The story was criticized for its weakness, but they did not count it as an issue for a rhythm game. Multiplayer features, including WiFi and StreetPass, received positive reviews, but GameSpot hoped there would have been an online function.

Commentators highlighted the game's track library as an impressive collection, praised the 70 songs that covered a wide range of styles, which ranged from 8-bit sounds in early games to orchestral arrangements in Final Fantasy XIII. Anime News Network commented that, it was not perfect but covered most of popular songs. and Polygon felt the lack of XIV was due to its negative reception. Giant Bomb found the DLC tracks to be worth purchasing but criticized the lack of a preview feature.

The humor elements—chibi-style characters, and the funny character dialogues like "At last, we tremble mythically for an idiot!"—were praised by commenters for adding "playful" and "colorful". Reviews found the EMS background cinematics nostalgic, while IGN found complaints on the repetitive FMS backgrounds.

=== iOS version ===
Reception (iOS)

Aggregate score
Aggregator	Score
Metacritic	78/100

Review scores
Publication	Score
IGN	7/10
TouchArcade	4/5
Digital Spy	4/5
PocketGamer	3.5/5
SlideToPlay	2/4
AppSpy	4/5

The iOS version received "average" reviews, according to the review aggregation website Metacritic. Reviews expressed that songs are expensive, but thought it suited players who enjoy rhythm games or Final Fantasy and did not care about the cost.

The iOS version followed the 3DS version's rhythm gameplay, and the tapping control, from 3DS stylus to iOS finger, was considered great by reviews. Due to iOS devices' capabilities, the version had better graphics quality with a smoother experience, but SlideToPlay criticized its "continuous" running problems. Reviewers found the introduced modes of Quest Medley and Compose Scores to be interesting. However, PocketGamer commented that the first mode worked well if players bought music to expand library, while IGN stated the latter one did not provide potential freedom to allow players to make a "Theatrhythm Zelda".

=== Sales ===
In the first week of release in Japan, sales of just shy of 70,000 were reported, despite Famitsu giving the 3DS version a score of one 10, two 9, and one 8 for a total of 36 out of 40. Within one month, by March 2012, said handheld version had sold 112,344 copies in Japan. As of February 2013, said version sold 163,098 units in Japan.

In February 2012, Nobuo Uematsu, longtime Final Fantasy composer, played the 3DS version of Theatrhythm Final Fantasy and expressed satisfaction, stating that "as I remembered various things from the past 20 years, I was reduced to tears. FF music fans should definitely play it. Won't you cry with me?"

== Sequels ==
A sequel, Theatrhythm Final Fantasy: Curtain Call, was released for the Nintendo 3DS on April 24, 2014, in Japan, and in September for North America, Australia and Europe. The game features 221 songs and a new versus battle mode. An arcade-based entry in the series, Theatrhythm Final Fantasy: All-Star Carnival, was released in 2016. A second sequel, Theatrhythm Final Bar Line, was released on February 16, 2023, for Nintendo Switch and PlayStation 4. Final Bar Line includes 385 songs from various Final Fantasy main soundtracks and arrangement albums. DLC is planned to add a further 90 songs from additional Square Enix franchises including NieR, The World Ends With You, Chrono Trigger and more.
