= Amplitude Studios =

French video game developer

Amplitude Studios SASU
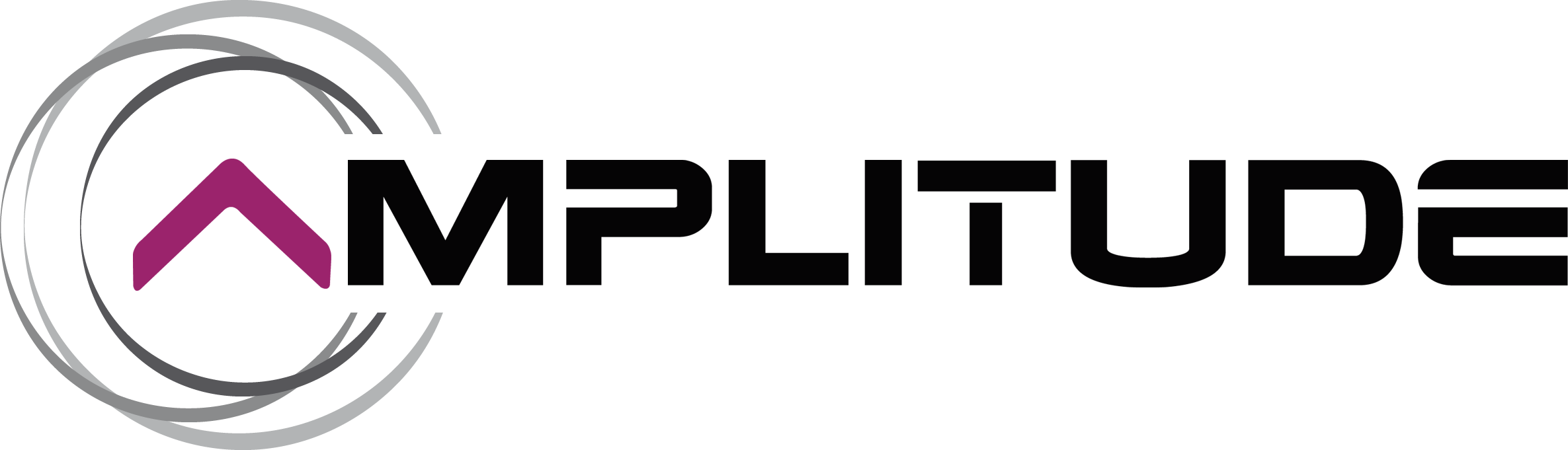
- Type: Private
- Industry: Video games
- Founded: 27 January 2011; 15 years ago
- Founder: Mathieu Girard; Romain de Waubert de Genlis
- Headquarters: Paris, France
- Products: Endless Legend; Dungeon of the Endless; Endless Space; Humankind
- Number of employees: 170 (2025)
- Parent: Sega (2016–2024)
- Website: amplitude-studios.com

Amplitude Studios SASU is a French video game developer based in Paris. The studio was founded in January 2011 by former Ubisoft employees Romain de Waubert de Genlis and Mathieu Girard. It began developing 4X series Endless, beginning with Endless Space released in 2012. The company was acquired by Sega in June 2016. Amplitude became independent again through a management buyout in 2024.

== History ==
Amplitude Studios focuses primarily on the development of titles for the personal computer (PC), and uses Steam's Early Access programme, as well as Games2Gether, a crowd-sourcing and voting platform developed by Amplitude Studios, for players to suggest and vote on design choices that should be taken into games from Amplitude Studios, to create a player-centered experience.

In July 2016, Sega announced that it had acquired Amplitude Studios in order to expand its reach on the PC gaming market. Founders Girard and de Waubert de Genlis stated that they agreed on the deal as they saw the opportunity to work alongside other Sega Europe studios, such as Creative Assembly and Relic Entertainment.

Girard eventually left Amplitude in 2018 after the release of Endless Space 2 to start his own company "Tactical Adventures", and would later go on to release Solasta: Crown of the Magister.

Amplitude Studios bought itself out from Sega and became an independent company in November 2024. Sega would continue to support Amplitude's current and planned near-term games during a transition period. The studio partnered with Passion Paris to develop an animated series based on the Endless series in 2025 and Hooded Horse to release Endless Legend II in 2026.

== Games developed ==
Year	Title	Platform(s)	Publisher(s)	Ref.
2012	Endless Space	macOS, Windows	Iceberg Interactive	
2014	Endless Legend	macOS, Windows	Iceberg Interactive	
2014	Dungeon of the Endless	macOS, Windows, Nintendo Switch, PlayStation 4, Xbox One, iOS, Android	Amplitude Studios	
2017	Endless Space 2	macOS, Windows	Sega	
2019	Love Thyself: A Horatio Story	macOS, Windows	Sega	
2021	Humankind	macOS, Windows, Stadia, PlayStation 4, PlayStation 5, Xbox One, Xbox Series X/S	Sega	
2023	Endless Dungeon	Windows, Nintendo Switch, PlayStation 4, PlayStation 5, Xbox One, Xbox Series X/S	Sega	
2026	Endless Legend 2	Windows, PlayStation 5, Xbox Series X/S	Hooded Horse	
2027	Humankind 2	Windows	Amplitude Studios	

== Accolades ==
- Finalist for "Independent Studio" award at the Develop Awards 2015.
