= Endless Space =

2012 video game

- Developer: Amplitude Studios
- Publisher: Iceberg Interactive (Note: Currently published by Sega.)
- Engine: Unity
- Platforms: Microsoft Windows, Mac OS X
- Release: Microsoft Windows; 4 July 2012; Mac OS X 31 August 2012
- Genres: Turn-based strategy, 4X
- Modes: Single-player, multiplayer

Endless Space is a 4X turn-based strategy video game developed by Amplitude Studios and originally published by Iceberg Interactive. It was released on 4 July 2012, for Microsoft Windows and 31 August for Mac OS X. In the game, the player takes charge of fictional Space Age civilizations, expanding their influence by colonization and conquest. Endless Space earned the Unity Golden Cube award in 2013. The game's sequel, Endless Space 2, was released in 2017.

The game's publishing rights is currently held by Sega after their acquisition of Amplitude Studios.

== Gameplay ==
In Endless Space the player chooses one of twelve unique civilizations, or can choose to create their own, to expand their interstellar empire and conquer the galaxy. To win, the player must be the first to meet the requirements for certain victory conditions, such as Economic, Diplomatic, Expansionary, and Supremacy victories.

The game is set in approximately 3000AD, tens of thousands of years after the extinction of an advanced civilization known as the Endless. The major empires of the galaxy seek to control and exploit the technology of the Endless for their own agendas. The game plays out on a randomly generated galaxy map with room for up to eight players/AI per game. Players colonize different star systems, which in turn contain up to six planets. Star systems are connected via a series of cosmic strings which allow ships to travel rapidly between neighbouring systems. In addition, hero units can be recruited to act as system administrators or fleet admirals, which provide bonuses depending on their traits that can further be leveled up. Battles take place in a quasi-real-time environment, similar to rock-paper-scissors.

The game features full modding and multiplayer compatibility as well.

== Gameplay ==
Endless Space is a turn-based strategy game set in 3000 AD, where each player (up to a maximum of eight per game) represents the leader of one of nine unique interstellar empires. A player may also choose to create their own unique civilization by selecting from a number of different traits that correspond to military, science, diplomacy, hero units and so on. Each player is to guide their empire over hundreds, if not thousands, of years to diplomatic, scientific, or military conquest, attempting to meet requirements for several different victory conditions. The game takes place in a randomly generated galaxy, which can change in size and shape, depending on how the host player chooses to generate it. Every player begins with one colonised capital system which is connected to further systems via cosmic links, which act as travel routes for starships. Players can also research new technologies from four different research trees, representing military, science, expansion/exploration and diplomacy. Research unlocks new ship types, planetary improvements, stat modifiers (either for heroes or planets), new travel methods which do not rely on cosmic links and more. As players expand their empire, they will gain access to strategic and luxury resources, which can be used to upgrade ships, build improvements and trade with other players. Strategic resources are primarily used to upgrade components of your empire, while luxury resources are primarily used for trade and maintaining your empire's approval rating.

The game uses four basic resources to manage its economy: Food, Industry, Dust and Science, or FIDS. Dust is a substance that was left over from the Endless civilization, used as currency. Players must balance FIDS in order to rapidly expand their empire, build ships and research advanced technologies. In addition, a lower or imbalanced FIDS across your empire results in a low approval rating. A high approval rating provides bonuses to production efficiency, while a low approval rating can drastically lower efficiency making it incredibly difficult to advance. A tax rate slider can also be adjusted to change approval rating, but lower taxes result in a lower revenue stream of Dust.

Hero units can be recruited using Dust, to act as either fleet commanders or system administrators. Each hero unit is unique and provides two unique bonuses, which can be further leveled up. Three hero units are randomly selected from a pool unique to each empire and new hero units are available for purchase every fifty turns.

Interstellar fleet battles take place in a quasi-real-time environment, similar to a complex game of rock-paper-scissors. Each battle scene takes place in three engagement stages: long-range, medium-range, and melee-range engagements, with different types of weapons and ship systems performing better or worse as the fleets increase in physical proximity over time. Fleets are issued up to three different 'cards', one for each stage of combat, which represent fleet-wide general orders, from categories such as attack, defend, tactics, sabotage, and engineering. Each card has a certain function, such as increasing the fleet's weapons damage by a certain amount (an 'attack' card), however some cards can counter opposing cards, as in the case of an 'attack' card played against an enemy's 'tactics' card during long-range engagement, where the attack card gives a straight damage improvement while the tactics card provides a damage improvement but weakens the fleet's defences correspondingly - the attack card's increased damage counters the tactics card's weakened defences, and the attacking fleet thus gains a sizable additional bonus to damage during long-range engagement. No traditional combat micromanagement takes place during these battles, though the player instead is engaged in terms of understanding fleet composition and attempting to predict and counter likely 'card' plays by the enemy fleet based on how the engagement has unfolded so far. More advanced or specialised cards may also be unlocked through research or through advanced training available to experienced commanders. Fleet size and composition play a very important role, such as determining combat effectiveness (when, per se, the attack card is played) and ability to maneuver. Fleets with hero units assigned to them may also experience bonuses. During battles, the camera is by default placed in a cinematic mode, but a free camera mode is also available.

== Release ==
Endless Space was made available for pre-purchase on 2 May 2012, on Steam. Customers who pre-ordered the game would receive access to the current alpha build and later beta builds prior to launch. In addition, customers who pre-ordered would be allowed to provide input on the game's development, through a feature called Games2Gether. The game was released on 4 July, on two digital distribution platforms: Steam and GamersGate. It came in two special editions: an 'Admiral' edition containing the original soundtrack and a forum badge and an 'Emperor' Special Edition containing the Admiral edition content, as well as a ship skin pack and an Endless hero.

== Reception ==
Reception

Aggregate score
Aggregator	Score
Metacritic	77/100

Review scores
Publication	Score
GameSpy	3.5/5
IGN	8/10

Award
Publication	Award
Unity Awards	Golden Cube award (2013); Community Choice award (2013)

Endless Space was met positively by critics, with an aggregate score of 77/100 on Metacritic. IGN praised the game for its accessibility and replay value, while criticizing the sound assets and unclear tool-tips for newer players. GameSpy gave Endless Space a rating of 3.5/5 stars, praising the game's user interface, but criticizing the game for lacking personality.

The game was also nominated for 5 awards by Unity Technologies. Endless Space won the Golden Cube and Community Choice awards at the Unite 2013 ceremony.

By March 2013, it had sold 300,000 copies.

== Sequels ==
Two other games in the Endless series were released in 2014: Endless Legend and Dungeon of the Endless. A direct sequel, Endless Space 2, was released in May 2017. Endless Dungeon, a successor to Dungeon of the Endless, was released in 2023.
