= Theatrhythm Final Fantasy: Curtain Call =

2014 video game

- North American cover art, featuring a curtain call with chibi-style Final Fantasy characters holding hands and singing
- Developers: indieszero sAs
- Publisher: Square Enix
- Director: Masanobu Suzui
- Producer: Ichiro Hazama
- Artist: Monster Octopus
- Series: Final Fantasy
- Platform: Nintendo 3DS
- Release: JP: April 24, 2014; NA: September 16, 2014; EU: September 19, 2014
- Genre: Rhythm
- Modes: Single-player, multiplayer

Theatrhythm Final Fantasy: Curtain Call (Note: Japanese: シアトリズム ファイナルファンタジー カーテンコール, romanized: Shiatorizumu Fainaru Fantajī Kāten Kōru) is a 2014 rhythm video game developed by indieszero and sAs and published by Square Enix for the Nintendo 3DS. As a sequel to the Theatrhythm Final Fantasy (2012) and the second title in the Theatrhythm series, Curtain Call retains the core gameplay, where players hit notes in time with music from the Final Fantasy series. Similar to its predecessor, the game features role-playing elements, allowing players to develop their characters, arrange four-person parties, and defeat bosses to clear quests.

The 1.5-year development period for Curtain Call began in late 2012, when the additional content for the original Theatrhythm Final Fantasy was nearing completion. Designed as the finale of Theatrhythm Final Fantasy, Curtain Call introduced several improvements over its predecessor. One major update was the addition of a button control scheme, designed to make it easier for players to enjoy the game during their commutes to work or school. The game also introduced two main modes: Versus Battle, which allows for two-player matches, and Quest Medleys, which enhance the role-playing elements. The track library tripled in size, expanding from around 70 to 221, which includes a supplement of tracks from spin-off titles. Furthermore, other Square Enix titles, such as SaGa, were included as downloadable content. Along with the expanded song library, the unlocking mechanics and selection interface were optimized to improve accessibility for players.

Curtain Call was well-received by critics, who applauded its significant improvements over its predecessor. Reviews highlighted how the game successfully evoked nostalgia for Final Fantasy and praised the fusion of rhythm and role-playing elements. The newly introduced design featuring two input schemes was applauded. The concept of Quest Medley was well-received, though some commenters felt the role-playing elements lacking impact on the gameplay. Though the competitive idea of the versus mode was considered fine, opinions were mixed on the disruptive interference mechanics. The expanded track library, with its extensive additions and its coverage of both title sources and genres, was also highly praised.

A Dragon Quest-based sequel was released in 2015. Although Curtain Call was considered the final Theatrhythm regarding Final Fantasy, two more titles were released: the arcade title All-Star Carnival (2016) and the console game Final Bar Line (2023).

== Gameplay ==
On Battle Music Stage (BMS), players need to hit notes in time with the music, with a background featuring chibi-style characters and enemies in battle.

Theatrhythm Final Fantasy: Curtain Call, similar to its predecessor Theatrhythm Final Fantasy, is a rhythm video game featuring Final Fantasy elements. Following the beat of music, players hit notes when they overlap with trigger marks. The game features several different types of notes that require players to either press, hold, or swipe. In contrast to its predecessor, which only featured touch controls, Curtain Call allows players to freely choose touch, button, or a combination of both schemes.

Songs are divided into three types based on their context in their respective games. The first is Battle Music Stage (BMS), which features a battle background where four chibi characters battle with enemies, with the screen displaying four fixed horizontal lanes where notes flow from left to right towards trigger marks. Next is Field Music Stage (FMS), which features a background with a single chibi character. A single left-to-right lane is present, with notes that shift up and down. The third is the Event Music Stage (EMS), which features a background clip from the original title. In this stage, the note track moves across the whole screen, and no characters are present. Each song featured three difficulty levels.

Curtain Call featured two modes: Quest Medleys and Versus Mode. Quest Medley, which have been introduced in iOS version of the original Theatrhythm, integrated role-playing elements. Before playing a quest, players need to arrange their four-person party from the unlocked character cast. Each character has their own level, statistics (HP, attack, etc.), skills, and type (such as defense and recovery). Quests are shown as Chaos Maps, with varying lengths and difficulties. Each map featured numerous nodes, with either FMSor BMS to play, and with route branches. To complete the song, on one hand, players need to play accurately to deal high damage; on the other, they have to develop characters to ensure that bosses are defeated before the end of the song. When completing maps, players earn crystal splinters, which can be collected to unlock characters.

In Versus Mode, players can battle with the computer, or another player online or locally. Players choose their songs, and the system randomly selects one. The player with the higher score wins the battle. For human versus, players can exchange their game profile cards and Chaos Maps. Versus gameplay features a special element called "EX Burst", which players can opt to enable or disable. By hitting notes, players will fulfill their "EX Burst Gauge". When the gauge is full, players can send a random interference, such as rotating arrow notes, to their rival's chart.

The game's background story involves collecting Rhythm Points to "restore the brilliance of the crystal that governs music". Rhythm Points can be collected by playing various stages and modes, with the amount earned related to the players' performance. When Rhythm Points reach certain numbers, players can unlock various elements, including tracks, characters, and sound effects. A new "Daily Feature" presents a song each day, while the featured song provides 1.5 times of the normal amount of Rhythm Points.

== Development ==
Theatrhythm Final Fantasy: Curtain Call is a rhythm game for Nintendo 3DS and developed by indieszero. Ichirō Hazama from Square Enix produced the game, while Masanobu Suzui, the president of indieszero, directed it. sAs, a frequent collaborator of indieszero, again co-developed the game.

The development period for the game, like its 3DS predecessor Theatrhythm Final Fantasy, was also about one and a half years. Work began in late 2012, around the time the iOS version of its predecessor was released. Initially, there were no plans for a sequel, but player demand led them to decide to create one.

Originally titled Theatrhythm Final Fantasy 2, it was later renamed "Curtain Call" by Tetsuya Nomura, a producer of the Final Fantasy franchise and the person who named "Theatrhythm", to signify it as the final installment in the Theatrhythm Final Fantasy series. Hazama described Curtain Call as a "definitive edition", indicating that he had no intention of producing further installments. With the mindset of creating a finale, the developers implemented significant changes based on player feedback, their own hands-on experiences, and the insights gained from developing 3DS and iOS versions of the original Theatrhythm. Hazama aimed to attract consumers who had shown interest in the first title but had not purchased it, and he hoped to evoke nostalgia for fans of the series with this Final Fantasy flavor game.

=== Design ===
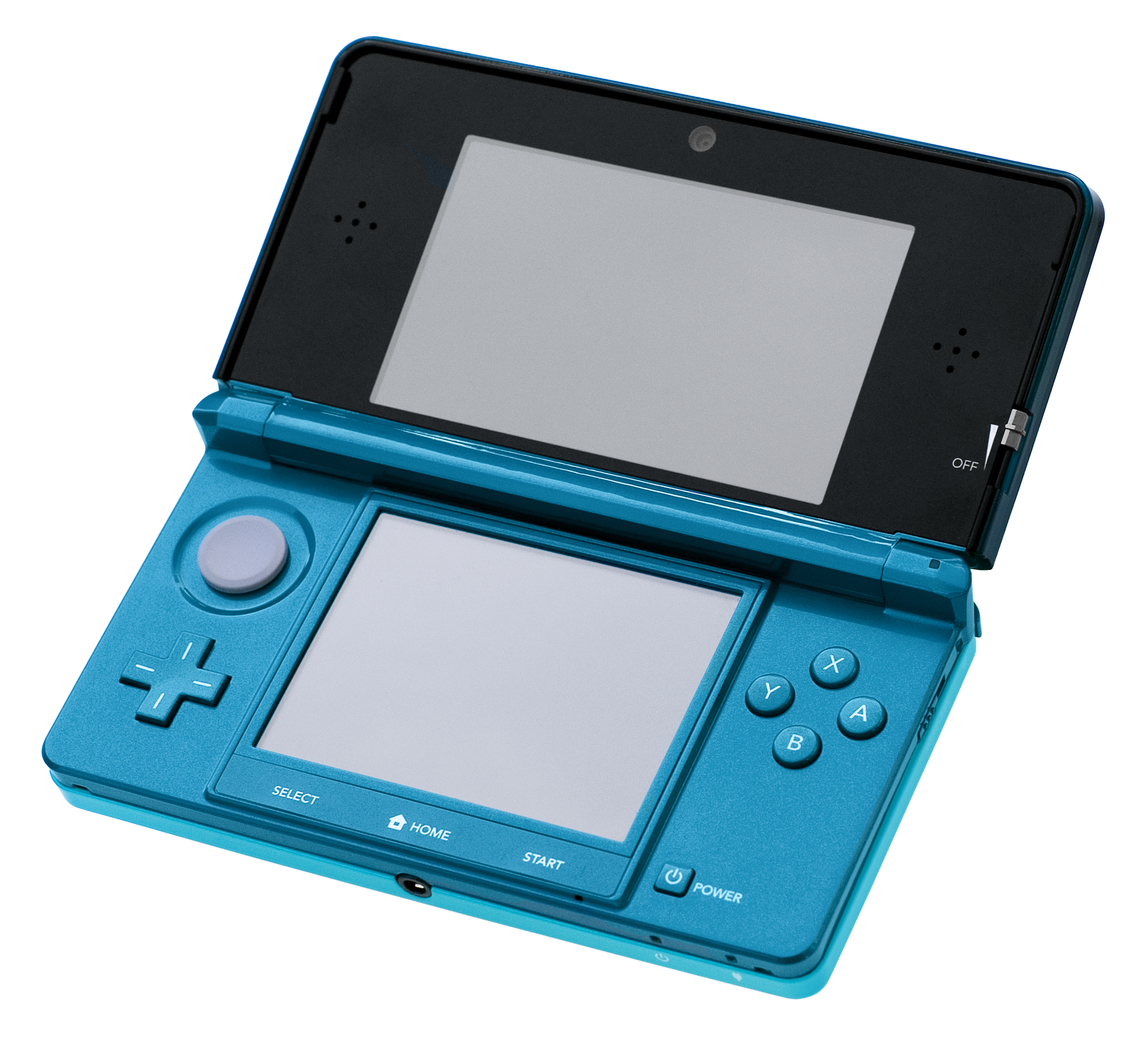
Curtain Call features both button and touch control schemes, distinguishing it from its 3DS predecessor, which only supports the touch input method.

Compared to its Nintendo 3DS predecessor, which only supported touch controls, Curtain Call introduced button controls. This addition reflected significant feedback from players who hoped to play during their commutes to work or school, though the factor had been considered but not implemented at that time. The team believed that offering multiple playing styles would be beneficial.

Two new features called Online Battle and Quest Medleys were introduced in Curtain Call. The developers believed that rhythm games naturally involve competition, therefore, they introduced the battle function allowing fans to share Final Fantasy music through versus matches in a cheerful atmosphere. Additionally, the profile card exchange system was also strengthened to expand this sentiment. Given the importance of online battles, a significant number of staff were allocated to ensure its early completion.

The subsequent task is managing Quest Medleys, another new main feature alongside the Battle mode. The mode followed the Final Fantasy-like classical role-playing game's formula. They believed this mode could extend the game's longevity. On one hand, players would be attracted to unlock maps, which featured songs, experience points, and other rewards. On the other hand, these maps can be exchanged between players, enhancing the game's interactivity. Hazama recalled that Nintendo Direct praised the feature as "full-fledged" during its early development stage; this praise led to tension and motivated the team to intensify their efforts.

The role-playing elements also received an enhancement. This change aids players who enjoy Final Fantasy music but struggle with action games, allowing them to complete tracks with a role-playing game manner by enhancing characters and strategically arranging skills. The Collectacards, a feature for character growth, were introduced to extend playing time. The character roster was also expanded, with selection based on player poll, similar to the approach used for Dissidia, to avoid staff's personal interest. The expanded character cast enables players to form a party with characters from a single title, like Final Fantasy XIII. To address collection issues caused by the expanded roster, the developers redesigned character crystals to match multiple candidates, replacing the old one-to-one system.

Yet, the role-playing game concept did not always work as expected. In the development of its predecessor, based on this idea, the developers were convinced that players would feel accomplished upon hitting the 99,999 Rhythm Points cap. However, players reported losing motivation once they hit this cap. Consequently, in Curtain Call, the developers increased the cap to about ten times the original limit, making it not easy to achieve. The variety of rewards from Rhythm Points was expanded, including various touch sounds, such as door-opening sound effects with reminiscences.

Besides the sound effects, the team took steps to make Curtain Call a true Final Fantasy game that resonates with fans' nostalgia. A notable effort was the meticulous design of backgrounds to faithfully recreate the original scenes. For example, in "Terra's Theme" from Final Fantasy VI, the background featured snowy mountains with a dynamic blizzard effect, echoing the original game's atmosphere. Although the interfaces of both titles share similarities, the developers essentially started from scratch with Curtain Call, incorporating features such as global network versus functionality and a 60 fps frame rate for 3D mode graphics.

=== Track library ===
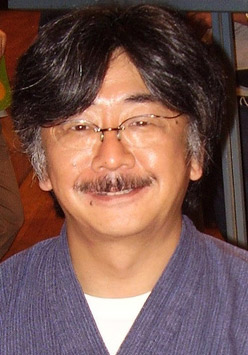
Curtain Call included more songs from Nobuo Uematsu, a veteran Final Fantasy composer, than the original Theatrhythm Final Fantasy.

Curtain Call features 221 songs, which according to the developers was "a roughly fourfold increase" over the original Theatrhythm Final Fantasy. Responding to player requests, songs from spin-offs were added. Rather than replacing songs from the previous title, most were retained to build a comprehensive game that represented the whole Final Fantasy series. Selecting the songs was not overly challenging: the staff conducted research and reviewed online rankings to include popular and fan-favorite tracks from across the series. They aimed to avoid letting staff bias interfere with the process; Hazama stated that he tried to prevent his own preferences from influencing the development to avoid creating a large but unbalanced library.

Some old songs were rearranged for differentiation, with EMS beatmaps converted to FMS or BMS songs for brand new experiences. Other charts were also changed; for example, "Dancing Mad" from Final Fantasy VI was redesigned to make "a sense of density". Despite players' complaints about the excerpt versions of the songs in the predecessor, the developers had to retain them. On one hand, there were cartridge storage limitations; on the other, it was hard to maintain player attention for an action-oriented nature game. However, the staff tried to balance this by cutting different sections of songs with multiple versions.

In an interview, Hazama stated that the number of tracks was crucial, and one method to achieve this was through downloadable content. Unlike its predecessor, which only featured Final Fantasy tracks, Curtain Call expanded its repertoire to include songs from various Square Enix titles. The inclusion of the SaGa series, stemming from the staff's joyful idea of creating Theatrhythm SaGa, marked a significant breakthrough that broadened the coverage of Theatrhythm beyond Final Fantasy. Negotiations with the SaGa creators, coinciding with the SaGa's 25th anniversary celebration, proceeded smoothly and successfully. Other Square Enix titles featured in downloadable content include Mana, Chrono Trigger, Live a Live, Xenogears, The World Ends with You, Nier, and Bravely Default.

Due to the significant expansion of the song library and player feedback for the predecessor, improvements in accessibility for playing songs were considered. The unlocking mechanics were redesigned in Curtain Call to enable players to quickly enjoy songs. Instead of unlocking songs primarily through accumulating Rhythm Points, in Curtain Call players could access almost all tracks within the first few hours. Another change was that players were no longer required to unlock higher difficulty levels sequentially. Furthermore, several functions were introduced to assist players in song selection. The search interface was enhanced to easily identify duplicate-named songs, such as "Battle 1". Additionally, the "Daily Feature" feature was implemented to help players who are unsure which song to choose. Featured songs were designed to correspond with the real-world date and time, sparking discussions among players on social media.

== Release and marketing ==
=== Japan ===
The first indication of Curtain Call's existence appeared in September 2013, when the trademark was registered for North America. The title was announced nearly two weeks later in Shonen Jump magazine, with a planned launch set for spring 2014. Curtain Call was subsequently showcased at the Tokyo Game Show 2013. During this exhibition, a trial version featuring 12 songs was available with 20 demo stations provided, and in the promotional campaign "Final Fantasy Go There", Hazama introduced the battle mode of Curtain Call and competed against Final Fantasy producer Yoshinori Kitase. A demo version with three tracks was released in December 2013. Shortly after, Curtain Call was showcased at Jump Festa 2014 held at Makuhari Messe.

In early February 2014, it was announced that Curtain Call would be released on April 24, 2014 in Japan, alongside a themed Nintendo 3DS LL that bundled a digital copy of the game. The "Theatrhythm Edition" 3DS LL featured a silhouette-style main visual designed by Monster Octopus, depicting a curtain call with characters holding hands and singing. The second demo version of Curtain Call, containing three tracks, was released on April 9, 2014. Players with the save data from "Demo Version 2" would receive more initial character candidates in the finished game as a reward. On the evening of April 23, the eve of its Japanese release, a 60-second "all-star" television advertisement aired as a one-time broadcast.

The first wave of DLC was released on the same day as the game, with two songs available for free for a limited time as a celebration. Starting in December 2014, downloadable content was released under the "2nd Performance" portion, with the final wave released in March 2015. The total number of tracks, including both standard and downloadable content, reached 321.

=== Western ===
In June 2014, Curtain Call was presented as a trailer at E3 2014, and its Western release date was announced for September. Square Enix held a Curtain Call contest in August 2014, inviting players to upload videos of their performances of Final Fantasy music. Judged by series composer Nobuo Uematsu, the contest offered the winner a trip to Japan to attend a Final Fantasy concert, along with a signed game copy and a themed Japanese 3DS. An English demo was released on the Nintendo eShop in September 2014, which unlocked additional characters in the full game if downloaded.

Curtain Call was released on September 16 in North America, and on September 19 in Europe. Alongside the release of the standard edition, a limited Collector's Edition was released in North America, which included twenty-five music CDs, a themed 3DS pouch, and several character collection cards. The downloadable content was also divided into two "performances", with several waves of song packs. The first wave was released with the game's launch, and the final wave was released in March 2015.

Regarding the five-month delay for a game with relatively little text, Hazama clarified that the issue was not with the translation itself but with the limited manpower of the development staff. After the Japanese version was released, the team needed to focus on developing DLC and taking needed breaks, while the localization process required further work such as readjusting text boxes due to differences in text length between languages.

== Reception ==
Reception

Aggregate scores
Aggregator	Score
Metacritic	83/100
OpenCritic	92% recommend (Note: Based on 37 reviews)

Review scores
Publication	Score
Edge	6/10
Electronic Gaming Monthly	9/10
Famitsu	35/40
Game Informer	8/10
GameSpot	8/10
IGN	8.5/10
RPGFan	95/100

Theatrhythm Final Fantasy: Curtain Call received "favorable" reviews according to the review aggregation website Metacritic, and had a recommendation rate of 92% on OpenCritic.

Reviews considered Curtain Call to be a significant improvement over its predecessor, Theatrhythm Final Fantasy, which was also seen as a success. GameTrailers commented that as a sequel, Curtain Call "makes its predecessor feel inferior in almost every way". Jeuxvideo stated that even fans who felt the publisher was "pushing it by opting for an easy approach" with the predecessor would admit that this "ultimate version" was different.

Many reviewers believed that Curtain Call evoked nostalgia for Final Fantasy and recommended it for series fans, including those who had bought the previous title. Digitally Downloaded described the game as focused on the music sector and serving as fan service, much like how the predecessor had done successfully. Polygon praised the Curtain Call "turns what could be empty nostalgia into a meaningful challenge". However, GamesRadar+ argued that the game was not impressive for non-fans of Final Fantasy.

=== Genre fusion and rhythm gameplay ===
The fusion of rhythm and role-playing elements was praised. Digital Trends lauded the game for "spacing out these inputs in a way that maximizes a feeling of connection with the song being played". IGN added, "I never stopped smiling while watching cute little sprites battle adorable monsters to the beat of my favorite Final Fantasy songs". Shacknews concluded that Square Enix successfully demonstrated the benefits of genre fusion in Curtain Call, but regretted that they "take a bow" without pushing further. In contrast, Edge felt it "never quite fits as neatly as you'd hope". Game Watch stated that there was an inherent dilemma: at high difficulty levels, the background animation often becomes disregarded, resulting in the rhythm and role-playing elements functioning independently.

The accessibility of song selection also received praise. GameSpot noted that the wide range of difficulty levels catered to different players, while Game Informer appreciated the medium difficulty level for its "wonderful balance". An editor in USgamer commended the removal of difficulty level locking in its predecessor, noting that players could skip the easiest difficulty. Famitsu highlighting the enhanced sorting and favorite functions, which improved the selection process. Polygon praised the performance analysis at the end of each song, which shows blocks where players can improve and encourages replaying.

The controls, including the dual input schemes, received praise from critics. IGN found tapping and sliding with a stylus to be enjoyable, while GamesRadar agreed, the game's accurate touch responsiveness. EGM, although acknowledging that some players appreciated the touch controls, was "truly shocked" by the new button control scheme for its greater accuracy. GameZone also called the button scheme an "elegant solution" for tackling the hardest difficulty. However, Joystiq, while agreeing that button controls are ideal for "a bumpy bus ride", felt that the circle pad struggled with managing wave notes in FMS. Game Informer concluded that the button scheme was suitable for battle songs, while the stylus controls were better suited for field tracks. Famitsu appreciated the game's support for freely switching between the two input modes within one game.

=== New modes and role-playing elements ===
The addition of Quest Medleys, which emphasized the role-playing aspect of the game, was praised by reviews. Joystiq and EGM noted that the Quest Medleys mode was well-suited for players with a block of time, though EGM was not completely satisfied with its length. They believed that the mode, which involves choosing paths, obtaining keys, and battling bosses, enhances the role-playing experience compared to the Chaos Maps in its predecessor. RPG Site highlighted other role-playing-style features, such as collecting items, unlocking songs, and leveling up characters. A review from USgamer, likening Curtain Call to a "Final Fantasy jukebox", noted that while Quest Medleys is essentially a playlist, it effectively "sells the illusion of an RPG".

However, some reviewers felt mini-stories should accompany the quests. IGN felt that without these stories, the quests would not differ from the predecessor's narrative of warriors defeating Chaos by collecting crystals. Game Watch suggested incorporating elements from the original games' plots during boss encounters.

Critics applauded the character system. RPGFan highlighted the diverse skills of characters, noting that it was worth replaying the game to customize a strong party. GameZone praised the excellent integration of leveling up and quests, and noted that invisible nodes added extra replay value to quest maps. EGM, while appreciating the expanded character cast, also commended the easy unlocking characters, where a single crystal could unlock several characters.

However, critics were dissatisfied with the limited impact the role-playing elements on gameplay. While GamesRadar criticized the mode as "window-dressing", noting that it operated automatically, IGN felt that the solid character customization system was underutilized, as players could complete a game using their rhythm game skills alone. GameTrailer, while acknowledging that the rhythm aspect should not be overshadowed by role-playing, expressed dissatisfaction with the shallow role-playing experience.

The competitive mode received mixed reviews. Game Informer described it as "a simple, fun way to enjoy the game with your friends". GameRevolution compared the mode to competitive versions of Tetris and Puyo Puyo, noting that the special attacks brought a sense of "nerve-wracking" tension. Destruction also found the element was worth the challenge for veterans. However, IGN felt that while the mode was interesting, it lacked long-term appeal due to its repetitiveness.

Other reviewers expressed their dislike of special attacks. A reviewer from USgamer complained that these disruptions reduced the enjoyment of playing difficult charts. Polygon was also critical of the "sabotages" element, describing them as a design to frustrate players and "distracted from the real purpose of Theatrhythm". Slant and Jeuxvideo suspected that players might opt to disable this randomness interference, though Game Watch felt that the option itself had reflected the developers' consideration.

=== Track library and reminiscence ===
The song library was praised for both its quantity and quality. EGM and Game Informer believed that compared to its predecessor with 70 or more songs, the threefold increase in the volume of songs was enough to recommend the game to fans. Polygon described the library "generous", noting that it covered the entire series, including songs from main titles to spin-offs. Other reviews noted that Curtain Call included then-new title Final Fantasy XIV: A Realm Reborn, lesser-known titles like Crystal Chronicles and Mystic Quest, as well as adapted animation movie Advent Children, marking it as "the most comprehensive collection of Final Fantasy music" at that time. However, Game Informer, while also praising the game's broad track coverage, stated that the vast library led to a "distillation" effect, meaning players were likely to encounter songs they were not interested in.

Digitally Downloaded praised the track library in its wide genre coverage, and said that while "you're not going to like every single song", there are tracks that players will replay repeatedly. Slant also applauded the depth and breadth of the music library, comparing the game to an "interactive version of the Distant Worlds concert series, in which live orchestras perform popular tracks". GameZone described the library as "absolutely perfect", with each title featured nine or ten songs. Game Watch found the game improved on the sound quality to its predecessor, while IGN found the game both maintained the sound quality and preserved the integrity of the songs. Digitally Downloaded complained the absence of certain titles, such as Chocobo Dungeon, though he agreed that such omissions were inevitable for fans.

The super deformed (chibi) style were praised by reviews. Digital Trends found the chibi style characters to be cute, while GamesRadar said that these deformed characters provided a "light-hearted" atmosphere, contrasting with the series' general tone. Slant emphasized the ending skit featuring numerous chibi-style characters, embodied the accumulation of the Final Fantasy series. Graphics and sound effects were also frequently noted by commenters for their nostalgic touches. Digital Spy also praised the "higher level of polish" in the Final Fantasy elements, including cursor sounds from Final Fantasy VII, airships, and landmarks. Game Watch echoed this, and highlighted the beautified EMS clips and the intricate FMS backgrounds evoking players' memories; GameRevolution called the screen layout "clean".

=== Awards and sales ===
During the 18th Annual D.I.C.E. Awards, the Academy of Interactive Arts & Sciences nominated Theatrhythm Final Fantasy for "Handheld Game of the Year". Curtain Call won the "Best Simulation Game" in Gamescom 2014. GamesRadar+ ranked the game as the number fifteen best Nintendo 3DS game to own, praising the number of songs, as well as the cutscenes and in-game collectible cards.

In its first week on sale in Japan, the game sold 81,000 copies, going through 56% of its shipment. Square Enix deliberately shipped a large quantity of the game because sales of the previous Theatrhythm were so strong that there were supply problems. According to the annual sales report of Famitsu, the games sold 128,000 copied in 2014 in Japan. In the United Kingdom market, Curtain Call ranked seventeenth in its debut week.

== Aftermath ==
In an interview coinciding with the launch of Curtain Call, Hazama discussed the potential for extending Theatrhythm beyond Final Fantasy. He rejected the idea of creating the Theatrhythm SaGa game, expressing that if there were a SaGa title, it would embody SaGa's unique atmosphere rather than being a mere substitution of Final Fantasy elements, requiring a significant amount of work. However, Hazama also expressed interest in applying the Theatrhythm framework to other game titles.

The Dragon Quest-based sequel, Theatrhythm Dragon Quest, was released in 2015, and received acclaim for its embodiment of Dragon Quest elements. Around the time of this release, Hazama proposed a planning for Theatrhythm Kingdom Hearts, which later became Kingdom Hearts: Melody of Memory.

Though it was initially stated that Curtain Call would be the last installment of Theatrhythm Final Fantasy, two additional Theatrhythm titles related to Final Fantasy were released. Final Fantasy: All-Star Carnival, an arcade game released in 2016 in Japan, emphasized the concept that "rhythm games mean arcade". The title focus on skills and high scores, introducing the fourth difficulty level for superior players, simultaneous pressing and flipping mechanics, and four-player competitions. Theatrhythm Final Bar Line, another Theatrhythm game featuring Final Fantasy music and also considered as the definitive finale, was released in 2023 for the Nintendo Switch and PlayStation 4.
