= Endless Legend =

2014 video game

- Retail cover art
- Developer: Amplitude Studios
- Publishers: Iceberg Interactive (formerly); Sega (formerly); Amplitude Studios (current)
- Engine: Unity
- Platforms: Microsoft Windows; Mac OS X
- Release: 18 September 2014
- Genres: 4X, turn-based strategy
- Modes: Single-player, multiplayer

Endless Legend is a turn-based 4X fantasy-strategy game developed by Amplitude Studios and published by Iceberg Interactive for Microsoft Windows and Mac OS X in September 2014. The purpose of the game is to dominate the world of Auriga with one of the fourteen races/factions through either diplomacy or war while developing new technologies, exploring new lands and founding new cities.

Endless Legend is the second game made by Amplitude Studios in their Endless series of titles, following Endless Space. A sequel, Endless Legend 2, was announced in January 2025.

== Gameplay ==
Endless Legend is a turn-based 4X strategy game, in which players take control of a fantasy faction to establish an empire through exploration, conquest, diplomacy and research. The game is set in the land of Auriga, with the layout of its landmass and ecosystems being randomized per game, represented on a model-like map made up of a hexagonal grid.

The map is populated with a variety of terrain, each made up of biomes within the world which have effects on the player's units. Tiles and their layout are all randomly generated to create a unique playable world with each separate playthrough.

Fog of war covers the play space requiring exploration by the player's units to find resources, minor factions, and races that players must utilize and exploit to benefit their growing empires.

Unlike other 4X games, the world map of Endless Legend is formed of separate regions. Once a city has been established within the borders of a region for the first time, the entire region becomes part of a faction's territory and control. At the start of each game, each faction begins with a settler unit to establish their first city and region. Regions can only host one city each within their borders.

== Reception ==
Reception

Aggregate scores
| Aggregator | Score |
|---|---|
| GameRankings | 83% |
| Metacritic | 82/100 |

Review scores
| Publication | Score |
|---|---|
| Eurogamer | 8/10 |
| GameSpot | 8/10 |
| IGN | 8.3/10 |
| PC Gamer (US) | 89/100 |

Endless Legend received positive reviews from critics. Review aggregation website Metacritic gathered an average rating of 82 out of 100 based on 35 reviews for the PC version. and GameRankings gathered a score of 83% based on 20 reviews.

PC Gamer US gave it an 89 out of 100: "Amplitude Studios has created another astounding story-driven game, that really has taken the best bits of RTS, RPG, and 4X, drawing much from Endless Space, and spun it differently for every faction". IGN commented: "It combines style, substance, and setting into a marvelous overall experience for both empire management and tactical combat", giving it an 8.3 out of 10. GameSpot warned of passive and weak AI but remarked that "Endless Legend's driving forces are so thoroughly executed that it serves as an imperfect, but well worthwhile step in the series, and hopefully a sign of things to come", giving it an 8 out of 10.

Rock, Paper, Shotgun named Endless Legend Game of the Year in 2014. During the 18th Annual D.I.C.E. Awards, the Academy of Interactive Arts & Sciences nominated Endless Legend for "Strategy/Simulation Game of the Year".

In a review of Endless Legend in Black Gate, Eeknight said "the ideal way to play Endless Legend would be online with a few friends. With this game's mechanics, the battles, backstabs and potential for a surprise coup would be epic".

== Sequel ==
A sequel titled Endless Legend 2 is set to be released as an early access game in early 2025. Amplitude Studios partnered with Hooded Horse for the game's release.
