= Theatrhythm Dragon Quest =

2015 video game

- Cover art featuring chibi style characters and monsters in the Dragon Quest series
- Developers: indieszero sAs
- Publisher: Square Enix
- Director: Masanobu Suzui
- Producer: Ichiro Hazama
- Composer: Koichi Sugiyama
- Series: Dragon Quest
- Platform: Nintendo 3DS
- Release: JP: March 26, 2015
- Genre: Rhythm
- Mode: Single-player

Theatrhythm Dragon Quest (Note: Japanese: シアトリズム ドラゴンクエスト, romanized: Shiatorizumu Doragon Kuesuto) is a 2015 rhythm video game developed by indieszero and sAs, and published by Square Enix for the Nintendo 3DS. It was the first game of its type in the Dragon Quest series, and the third Theatrhythm game after Theatrhythm Final Fantasy and Theatrhythm Final Fantasy: Curtain Call. While following rhythm games' formula, players hit notes on the beat of music. The title also incorporates role-playing elements, allowing players to assemble a party of four characters to engage in battles or march automatically, in synchronizing with the players' beats.

Theatrhythm Dragon Quest features 60 songs from the first ten main Dragon Quest titles, with arranged versions of the music that were overseen by Koichi Sugiyama, the series composer. Additional songs were released in several waves of free downloadable content. The game was considered to follow the formula of Theatrhythm Final Fantasy. Reviews praised its gameplay mechanics, incorporating of series signature elements, and its aesthetic design, but criticized it for lacking original version soundtracks and featuring a limited song library. The game sold 120,000 copies in 2015.

== Gameplay ==
A Battle Music Stage (BMS), which corresponds to the first-person perspective battle in the Dragon Quest series, features notes moving from top to bottom in four lanes.

Theatrhythm Dragon Quest, like the Theatrhythm Final Fantasy predecessors, is a rhythm game. Following the music's beat, players hit notes as they align with the trigger circle. The game featured various kinds of notes: "touch notes" that require a single tap, "slide notes" that need to follow the arrow's direction by sliding, and "hold notes" that demand a sustained press. The note charts are displayed on the top screen of the Nintendo 3DS, with players controlling the game using either the lower touchscreen or a combination of any button and the circle Pad.

Songs are categorized into three different gameplay styles: the Battle Music Stage (BMS), the Field Music Stage (FMS), and the Event Music Stage (EMS). BMS features intense battle music and accompanied by the background animation of character battles. Unlike the horizontal note scrolling in Theatrhythm Final Fantasy, notes in Theatrhythm Dragon Quest flow from top to bottom. FMS primarily includes relaxed field songs with backgrounds depicting the characters' adventures, which are similar to those in Theatrhythm Final Fantasy. EMS, in contrast to the chibi style characters in the two previous styles, presents the original game's visuals. Each song has three difficulties. In addition to the normal gameplay, Theatrhythm Dragon Quest introduced the Simple mode, where slides are replaced with tap.

Theatrhythm Dragon Quest also integrates role-playing elements. There are dozens of characters from various Dragon Quest titles, each with their own attributes, such as level, statistics, class, and abilities. Before playing songs, players need to arrange a four-person party. During gameplay, characters automatically attack enemies (in BMS) or marches forward (in FMS), and the attack power or advance speed is related to the player's accuracy. After the game, the characters will earn experience points and level up to strengthen themselves. The game features a challenge mode that allows players to unlock tracks. To clear challenges, such as defeating bosses, players must develop their characters and choose suitable party members. Characters can change their classes in Alltrades Abbey, the recurring place in the Dragon Quest series to do so.

Another mode is Sugoroku, a recurring element in the Dragon Quest series. It is a Japanese board game similar to Ladders, where players advance to the goal by rolling dice. Players may encounter events in Sugoroku games, such as playing a BMS song to earn a reward. By clearing Sugoroku boards, players can earn orbs that allow them to unlock characters. Players can communicate with other players via StreetPass, a feature that enables passive communication with nearby Nintendo 3DS users, to collect slate fragments and unlock Sugoroku boards.

== Development and release ==
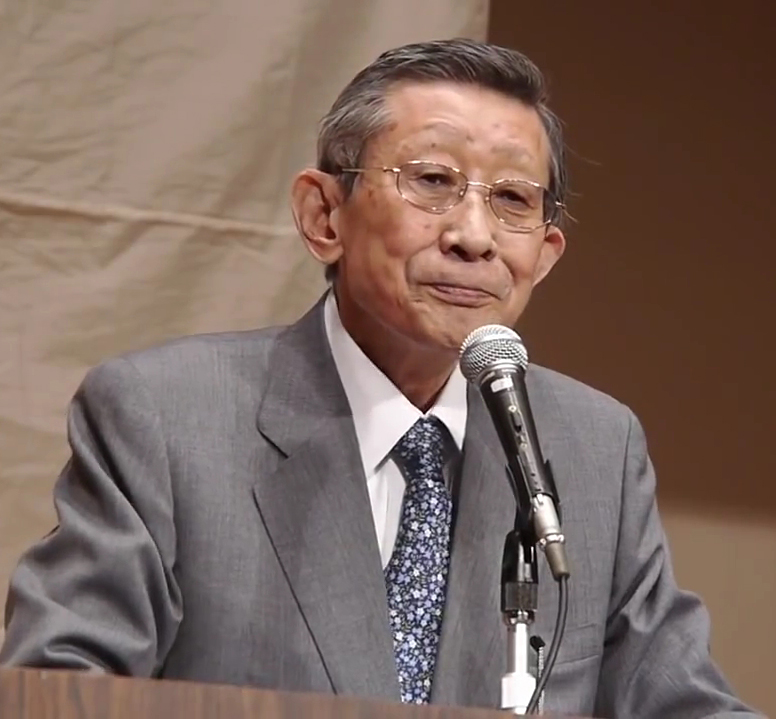
The tracks were overseen by Koichi Sugiyama, the composer of the Dragon Quest series.

Theatrhythm Dragon Quest is the first rhythm game in the Dragon Quest series, which is a role-playing game-based series by Square Enix. It is the third title in the Theatrhythm series, after Theatrhythm Final Fantasy (2012) and Theatrhythm Final Fantasy: Curtain Call (2014). Developers indieszero and sAs return to develop the game. Director Masanobu Suzui, president of indieszero and the director of previous games, is a fan of the Dragon Quest series and interested in its music. He aspires to be involved in Dragon Quest-related development projects since entering the video game industry.

There are 60 songs in the base game, which were selected from the first ten main Dragon Quest titles, with each title sharing around six tracks. Music are synthesized orchestral arrangements of the original music, and were overseen by series composer Koichi Sugiyama. Additional tracks were released as free downloadable content via the Nintendo eShop, including some soundtracks from original Family Computer (NES) games. Producer Ichirō Hazama mentioned in an interview that developers would monitor fan feedback as to what additional songs would be included as downloadable content (DLC).

Theatrhythm Dragon Quest was revealed at Jump Festa 2015 on December 10, 2014 with a playable demo. A trial version with two tracks was released on March 11, 2015. A promotional mobile app called Intro Quiz Battle operated from March 20 to April 30, allowing users to listen to intro of music from the Dragon Quest series and answer questions about their origins.

The title was released on March 26, 2015 in Japan. The first collection of DLC was published concurrently with the game. The following three DLCs were released from April to May. The fifth and the final DLC was released in June 2015 and contains four songs. Furthermore, several additional EMS tracks were released early through Wi-Fi access points in 7-Eleven or Tsutaya in April and May. These tracks were re-released in July.

Players who pre-ordered the game could download the Nintendo 3DS theme "Dragon Quest Music Band", which features chibi-style characters and monsters from the series. Additionally, the console will play the music "Love Song Sagashite" from Dragon Quest II when waking from sleep mode. A set of themed rubber straps, featuring 10 chibi-style characters, was sale after the game's release.

== Reception ==
Reception

Review scores
Publication	Score
Famitsu	35 out of 40
GameRevolution	6 out of 10
Nintendo World Report	7 out of 10
Ultra Console Game	25 out of 30

Reviews found that Theatrhythm Dragon Quest followed the formula established by Theatrhythm Final Fantasy, while incorporating distinctive Dragon Quest elements such as class change and the first-person perspective battle style in BMS.

The gameplay mechanics were well received. Reviews applauded the title was suitable for a wide range of players, as it includes three difficulty levels, the option to switch freely between touch and button control schemes, and the Simple Mode for beginners. Both the Challenge mode and the Sugoroku mode were also praised by reviews. However, Nintendo World Report was dissatisfied with the lack of multiple modes. The reviews noted that the track unlocking process is tedious. In Curtain Call, only four songs needed to play to unlock tracks, whereas in Theatrhythm Dragon Quest, players have to play ten songs to achieve the same.

Reviews found that selected songs evoked a sense of nostalgia and provided a feeling of exhilaration, yet the music library was limited in size. Destructoid writer Joel Peterson applauded the music composed by Sugiyama and stated that it "is so beautiful, timeless, and memorable". He also expressed his gladness at owning an import console to enjoy the music. However, the base game's track library, which mainly featured arranged music rather than classic 8- or 16-bit soundtracks, was criticized for lacking nostalgia. Hidetaka Nagayoshi from Inside commented that while the timbre of arrangements is beautiful, the different atmosphere from the original song made it uneasy for fans of Dragon Quest.

Reviews praised Theatrhythm Dragon Quest for its smooth, colorful visuals and cute chibified characters. A Famitsu editor praised the use of pixel art animations from the original titles, calling them strong reminiscences. However, he felt the chibi style was somehow clashed with the atmosphere of the original titles. Nintendo World Report criticized it for lacking 3D support which was featured in Curtain Call.

More than 76,000 copies were sold in its first week, making it the best-selling Nintendo 3DS game in that week. The game sold 124,000 copies in 2015.
