= Darkness Within =

Darkness Within may refer to:

- Darkness Within: In Pursuit of Loath Nolder, a 2007 first-person 3D adventure / horror thriller video game
  - Darkness Within 2: The Dark Lineage
- "Darkness Within" (song), a song by American heavy metal band Machine Head
- Darkness Within, a 2020 novel in the Warriors: The Broken Code series by Erin Hunter
- "Darkness Within", an episode of Ninjago from Ninjago: Crystalized
