= Starpoint Gemini =

2010 video game

- Developer: Little Green Men Games
- Publisher: Iceberg Interactive
- Engine: IC Whale Engine
- Platform: Microsoft Windows
- Release: WW: December 15, 2010
- Genres: Real-time strategy, role-playing
- Mode: Single-player

Starpoint Gemini is a real-time simulation/role-playing game for PC developed by Little Green Men Games, published by Iceberg Interactive and released December 15, 2010. It has received 4 sequels: Starpoint Gemini 2, Starpoint Gemini Warlords and Starpoint Gemini 3.

== Gameplay and Plot ==
Within the setting of the game, players freely pilot a customizable starship within the Gemini star system, in which non-player characters continuously act out their roles with or without player interaction. Players may decide to engage in combat with other ships, or to gather resources by mining and trading. Players may also conduct research and upgrade and purchase additional ships. Later in the game, players may choose to participate in large-scale engagements against other fleets and battle stations.

Available ship upgrades include equipment such as shield emitters, grappling beams, plasma cannons and shockwave generators. The player can create their avatar at the beginning of the game with some starting maneuvers, which they can later upgrade during the game. Additionally, skills and maneuvers can be learned by gaining experience. Officers may be hired by the player for additional skills.

== History ==
On December 15, 2010, Starpoint Gemini was initially released, and on February 16, 2012, it was made available on Steam. On January 13, 2020, an update was released, restoring Windows 10 support and adding Steam Cloud functionality.

=== Sequel ===
Starpoint Gemini 2 is the sequel to the original PC game and was released on September 26 of 2014. Most of the gameplay elements are unchanged, with most of the differences being graphical and technical improvements. Notably, movement is in a full 3D space and combat controls are more direct and action based.
