= Conarium (video game) =

2017 video game

- Developer: Zoetrope Interactive
- Publisher: Iceberg Interactive
- Designers: Onur Şamlı; Oral Şamlı; Galip Kartoğlu
- Programmer: Galip Kartoğlu
- Writers: Onur Şamlı; Oral Şamlı; Galip Kartoğlu
- Composers: Onur Şamlı; Oral Şamlı
- Engine: Unreal Engine 4
- Platforms: Windows; Linux; macOS; PlayStation 4; Xbox One; Nintendo Switch
- Release: Windows; June 6, 2017; Linux, Mac; February 5, 2018; PS4, Xbox One; February 12, 2019; Switch; February 4, 2021
- Genres: Adventure, horror
- Mode: Single-player

Conarium is a Lovecraftian horror adventure video game, inspired by H. P. Lovecraft's novella At the Mountains of Madness. The game was developed by Turkish game development studio Zoetrope Interactive, published by Dutch indie game publisher Iceberg Interactive, and was first released for Microsoft Windows in June 2017. It was subsequently ported to Linux and macOS in 2018, PlayStation 4 and Xbox One in 2019, and the Nintendo Switch in 2021.

== Plot ==
Conarium follows four scientists in their endeavor to challenge what we normally consider to be the absolute limits of nature. The scientist sought to transcend human consciousness with the use of a so-called Conarium device.

The player controls Frank Gilman, one of the four scientists of the Antarctic expedition. At the beginning of the game Gilman wakes up alone at Upuaut, a research base located in Antarctica. The room where he wakes up has a strange device on the table emitting odd noises and with pulsating lights. Gilman has no idea what the device is, nor has he any recollection of what happened prior to him passing out.

He discovers the research base abandoned, with no trace of the other scientists. Gilman must uncover what happened to the others of his expedition by exploring the Antarctic base and its surroundings. During his search he experiences strange visions and dreams, which feel like memories that he cannot place.

== Gameplay ==
Playing from a first-person perspective, players must explore the Antarctic base to solve the mystery of what happened to the other expedition members. This objective is achieved by exploring the environment and solving puzzles. Players can find and look at notes, journals, and other documents.

== Development ==
Conarium was developed by Zoetrope Interactive, a Turkish indie developer consisting of three members: Galip Kartoğlu, Onur Şamlı, Oral Şamlı. They previously worked on Darkness Within: In Pursuit of Loath Nolder and Darkness Within 2: The Dark Lineage, also published by Iceberg Interactive. Conarium was originally announced as “Mountains of Madness” in 2015. Iceberg Interactive signed the game in July 2016. The game was released on June 6, 2017 for Microsoft Windows.

Versions for Linux and MacOS were released on February 5, 2018.

Conarium was made using the Unreal Engine 4. Having been favourably received by PC gamers; on February 12, 2019 the game found its way onto consoles (PlayStation 4 and Xbox One).

== Reception ==
Reception

Aggregate score
Aggregator	Score
Metacritic	PC: 71/100; PS4: 65/100; XONE: 70/100

Review scores
Publication	Score
Adventure Gamers	2.5/5
Polygon	7.5/10
Push Square	7/10

Conarium received "mixed or average" reviews, according to review aggregator Metacritic. The Telegraph praised the game for its Lovecraftian atmosphere: "It's rare to find a jaunt into the world of the Cthulhu Mythos that stays so true to the feel without retreading old ground, and for that alone, Conarium is a must-play for fans of the tentacled one and his many eldritch buddies", and awarded it four out of five stars. Polygon's Philip Kollar noted that the game "Conarium could have pushed deeper, but it stays true to the spirit of Lovecraft's work." and scored the game a 7.5 out of 10. Chris Shive of Hardcore Gamer gave the game a positive review and called attention to its soundtrack, noting that "Conarium's soundtrack sets an ominous mood of dread and is effective in creating this Lovecraftian waking nightmare Frank has to navigate."

Conarium was chosen to showcase at IndieCade Festival 2017. Conarium won “The Game of the Year” and “Best PC Game” at the Kristal Piksel (Crystal Pixel) Video Game Awards 2017 ceremony, an annual awards ceremony for the Turkish game industry.
