= Star Lord (disambiguation) =

Star-Lord is a fictional character appearing in American comic books published by Marvel Comics.

Star Lord may also refer to:

- Peter Quill (Marvel Cinematic Universe), the Marvel Cinematic Universe version of the comic character
  - T'Challa (Marvel Cinematic Universe), who later becomes Star-Lord in the television series What If...?.
- Kitty Pryde, the second Star-Lord in the Marvel Universe
- Song Jiang, an outlaw leader known as Star Lord in the novel Water Margin
- Starlord (comics), a British science fiction comic
- Starlord (play-by-mail game), based on a 1977 board game of the same name
- Starlord (video game), a 1993 computer game by Microprose
- Star Lords, a 2014 computer game
