= The Lost Crown: A Ghost-Hunting Adventure =

2008 video game

- Developers: Darkling Room; Shadow Tor Studios (Special effects)
- Publishers: Got Game Entertainment (U.S.); Akella (Russia); Mamba Games (UK and Europe as of September 2009); Iceberg Interactive
- Designer: Jonathan Boakes
- Engine: Made with Wintermute Engine
- Platform: Microsoft Windows
- Release: NA: March 3, 2008; EU: July 18, 2008
- Genre: Third & First-person adventure
- Mode: Single player

The Lost Crown: A Ghost-Hunting Adventure is a British graphic adventure video game released in 2008. The Lost Crown is the third full title to be written and developed by Jonathan Boakes, author of Dark Fall: The Journal and Dark Fall 2: Lights Out. The screenplay follows the adventure of Nigel Danvers, as he experiences the paranormal in his quest to find the fabled Lost Crown of Anglia. The game was followed by The Last Crown: Midnight Horror and The Last Crown: Blackenrock.

== Gameplay ==
Presented in both first and third-person perspectives, The Lost Crown is a point-and-click game, featuring puzzles, conversations, and inventory based interaction. The game follows the adventure of Nigel Danvers, as he wanders the harbor town of Saxton and the surrounding countryside, armed with a small arsenal of ghost-hunting gadgets. Eventually, after uncovering and exorcising several ghosts, Nigel discovers the whereabouts of a long lost Anglo-Saxon crown; thought to have crowned the king of the region, Ganwulf, back in the sixth century AD.

== Plot ==
Vividly set in the fictional harbor town of Saxton in The Fens of eastern England, The Lost Crown follows the adventures of two young ghost-hunters, Nigel Danvers and Lucy Reubans. Nigel has fled London, following the theft of several documents from his employer, The Hadden Corporation. The documents contain proof of Hadden’s involvement in experiments with paranormal forces, and the existence of ‘chasm ghosts’. Two Hadden agents, Mr. Hare, and Mr. Crow are dispatched to capture Danvers and return the stolen documents.

Nigel takes refuge in Saxton, where he meets local psychology student, Lucy Reubans. Together they set out to solve local mysteries, study paranormal activity and discover the whereabouts of a legendary Anglo-Saxon crown, thought to be buried somewhere in the vicinity around town. Nigel’s presence in the town does not go unnoticed. There are those, alive and dead, that do not wish the crown to be disturbed.

== Development ==
The Lost Crown was written by Jonathan Boakes, between 2005 and late 2007. The story is an exploration of the ‘classic ghost story’, featuring references to many ghost stories read by the author in childhood. Most notably, M. R. James A Warning to the Curious features many influential elements; the seaside setting, the legend of the lost Anglo-Saxon Crown, a greedy archaeologist and the presence of a ghostly guardian, sworn to protect the whereabouts of the crown, even after death.

Other literary influences include J.L.Carr’s A Month in the Country, which features a lonely protagonist camped out in a rural country church, left alone to uncover a secret over the course of an apparently endless, hot summer.

Boakes also joined a group of ‘modern day ghost-hunters’ in order to research the game, following on from paranormal experiments seen in Dark Fall and Dark Fall 2. Known as This Haunted Land, the group are based in Cornwall, England, and share a passion for the paranormal and the use of technology used during investigations. Many of the results gleaned from those experiments have made their way into the game, such as the use of E.M.F meters, Nite-Vision cameras and E.V.P

Many of the scenes were created from photography made in real places in Cornwall, notably the fishing towns of Looe and Polperro.

== Reception ==
Reception

Aggregate score
Aggregator	Score
Metacritic	71/100

Review scores
Publication	Score
Adventure Gamers	3.5/5
GameZone	7/10
IGN	7/10
PC Format	63%
PC Gamer (UK)	54%
PC Gamer (US)	68%
PC Zone	54%

The game received "average" reviews according to the review aggregation website Metacritic.

Diehard GameFAN awarded the game its "Best PC game of 2008" award as well as its "Adventure Game of the Year" and "Best Story" awards.
