= Speed of light (disambiguation) =

The speed of light is a physical constant, the rate at which light travels in a vacuum.

Speed of Light may also refer to:

- Refractive index, the speed of light in a material relative to in vacuum
- Speed of light (cellular automaton), the greatest rate of information propagation in a cellular automaton

== Music ==
- "Speed of Light", a song by the band Orchestral Manoeuvres in the Dark, from their 1991 album Sugar Tax
- "Speed of Light", a song by guitarist Joe Satriani, from his 1993 album Time Machine
- "Speed of Light", a song by the band Stratovarius, from their 1996 album Episode
- "Speed of Light", a song by the band van Canto, from their 2008 album Hero
- "Speed of Light", a song by the band Teenage Fanclub, from their 1997 album Songs from Northern Britain
- "Speed of Light", a song by the hip-hop recording artist Chance the Rapper, from his 2025 album Star Line
- "Speed of Light" (Speed song), a single by South Korea boy group Speed
- Speed of Light (album), a 2009 album by Corbin Bleu
- "Speed of Light" (Iron Maiden song), 2015

== Other ==
- The Speed of Light, a 2005 novel by Javier Cercas

== See also ==
- Faster than the speed of light (disambiguation)
- Lightspeed (disambiguation)
- The Speed of Darkness (disambiguation)
