= Baron Wittard: Nemesis of Ragnarok =

2011 video game

- Developer: Wax Lyrical Games
- Publisher: Iceberg Interactive
- Engine: DX Studio
- Platform: Microsoft Windows
- Release: February 18, 2011
- Genre: Adventure
- Mode: Single player

Baron Wittard: Nemesis of Ragnarok is an adventure video game developed by two-person team Wax Lyrical Games, and published by Iceberg Interactive. It was released in Europe and the US on 18 February 2011.

== Plot ==
Set in a mysterious utopian city that has been abandoned, the player takes on the role of an anonymous urban photographer who becomes trapped at the center of a battle between good and evil at the time of Ragnarök.

== Development ==
Baron Wittard is the premiere title of Wax Lyrical Games, created by the two-person team consisting of Marlies Maalderink (in the Netherlands) and me Alan Thorn in the UK. Video game writer and designer Thorn 's design philosophy was to create an "enchanting and enthralling" opportunity for players to explore the ancient ruins of a rich history. Commencing in December 2010, the developers published a developer diary for their upcoming game. It was hosted on Just Adventure, while German and Dutch translations were listed at Adventure-Treff.de and Adventure-Island.nl respectively. On February 18, 2011, the game was made available in retail stores in the UK, Scandinavian and Benelux territories.

== Reception ==
Adventure Gamers thought the game's lackluster gameplay was counteracted by its haunting atmosphere. Just Adventure praised it as intelligent, challenging, and atmospheric. Gry Online praised the game's symphonic soundtrack. GameZone.de thought the graphics came across as a bit old-fashioned for the time.

DieHard GameFan listed the title as one of the "Ten Indie Games to Look For in 2011".
