= Iceberg Interactive =

Video game publisher

- Industry: Video games
- Founded: (2009)
- Headquarters: Haarlem, Netherlands
- Key people: Erik Schreuder (CEO); Howard Newmark (Sales Director); Raymond Snippe (Business Development Director)
- Website: www.iceberg-games.com

Iceberg Interactive is a privately held video game publisher based in Haarlem, Netherlands. It publishes video games for Windows, macOS, Linux, Xbox and PlayStation.

== Overview ==
Iceberg Interactive was founded in 2009 and is responsible for publishing more than 60 titles including games such as Endless Space, Killing Floor and StarDrive. It supports development studios by offering quality assurance, translation and product localization, distribution, public relations and marketing. Since the 2010s, Iceberg Interactive has shifted its main focus from retail to digital distribution.

== Games published ==
Game	Year	Developer	Platform(s)	Notes
The Lost Crown: A Ghost-Hunting Adventure	2008	Darkling Room	PC	Worldwide rights.
Restaurant Empire 2	2009	Enlight Software	PC	Limited rights.
Ship Simulator 2008	2009	VSTEP	PC	Limited rights.
Killing Floor	2009	Tripwire Interactive	PC, macOS, Linux	Limited rights.
Red Orchestra	2009	Tripwire Interactive	PC	Limited rights.
Darkness Within: In Pursuit of Loath Nolder	2009	Zoetrope Interactive	PC	Worldwide rights.
Adam's Venture Ep1. The Search for the Lost Garden	2009	Vertigo Games	PC	Worldwide rights, currently expired.
Zeno Clash	2009	ACE Team	PC	Limited rights, currently expired.
Return to Mysterious Island 2	2009	Kheops Studio	PC	Limited rights, currently expired.
Dracula Trilogy	2009	Microïds	PC	Limited rights, currently expired.
Dark Fall: The Journal	2009	Darkling Room	PC	Limited rights, currently expired.
Dark Fall II: Lights Out	2009	Darkling Room	PC	Limited rights.
Barrow Hill	2009	Shadow Tor Studios	PC	Worldwide rights.
Dark Fall: Lost Souls	2009	Darkling Room	PC	Worldwide rights.
Poker Simulator	2009	NetMin Games	PC	Limited rights, currently expired.
Ninja Blade	2010	From Software	PC	Limited rights, currently expired.
Still Life 2	2010	Microïds	PC	Limited rights, currently expired.
Sail Simulator 2010	2010	Scentec Software	PC	Limited rights, currently expired.
Wings of Prey	2010	Gaijin Entertainment	PC	Limited rights.
Airport Control Simulator	2010	Nemesys Team Studio	PC	Limited rights, currently expired.
Armada 2526	2010	Ntronium Games	PC	Worldwide rights.
Darkness Within 2: The Dark Lineage	2010	Zoetrope Interactive	PC	Worldwide rights.
Space Shuttle Mission Simulator: The Collector's Edition	2010	Exciting Simulations	PC	Limited rights, currently expired.
Global Agenda	2010	Hi-Rez Studios	PC	Limited rights, currently expired.
Craft of Gods	2010	Cyberdemons	PC	Limited rights, currently expired.
The Ball	2010	Teotl Studios	PC	Limited rights, currently expired.
Last Half of Darkness: Tomb of Zojir	2010	WRF Studios	PC	Limited rights, currently expired.
Bracken Tor	2010	Shadow Tor Studios	PC	
Earthrise	2011	Masthead Studios	PC	Limited rights, currently expired.
Baron Wittard: Nemesis of Ragnarok	2011	Wax Lyrical	PC	Limited rights, currently expired.
Starpoint Gemini	2011	Little Green Men Games	PC	Worldwide rights.
Trapped Dead	2011	Headup Games/Crenetic	PC	Limited rights.
Armada 2526: Supernova	2011	Ntronium Games	PC	Worldwide rights.
Adam's Venture Ep2. Solomon's Secret	2011	Vertigo Games	PC	Worldwide rights, currently expired.
Alter Ego	2011	bitComposer Games	PC	Limited rights, currently expired.
Family Farm	2011	Hammerware	PC, macOS, Linux	Limited rights, currently expired.
Nuclear Dawn	2011	Interwave Studios	PC, macOS, Linux	Worldwide rights.
Revenge of the Titans	2011	Puppygames	PC, macOS, Linux	Limited rights, currently expired.
Star Ruler	2011	Blind Mind Studios	PC	Limited rights, currently expired.
ACES High	2011	Hitech Creations	PC	Limited rights, currently expired.
Oil Rush	2012	Unigine Corp	PC, macOS, Linux	Limited rights, currently expired.
APB Reloaded	2012	Reloaded Productions	PC	Limited rights, currently expired.
Armada 2526: Gold Edition	2012	Ntronium Games	PC	Worldwide rights.
Blades of Time	2012	Gaijin Entertainment	PC, macOS	Limited rights.
Last Half of Darkness: Society of the Serpent Moon	2012	WRF Studios	PC	Limited rights, currently expired.
Last Half of Darkness: Society of the Serpent Moon	2012	WRF Studios	PC	Limited rights, currently expired.
Gemini Wars	2012	Camel 101	PC, macOS	Worldwide rights.
SOL: Exodus	2012	Bit Planet Games	PC	Limited rights, currently expired.
Cristiano Ronaldo: Freestyle	2012	Biodroid Entertainment	PC, macOS	Limited rights, currently expired.
Endless Space	2012	Amplitude Studios	PC, macOS	Limited rights, currently expired.
Real Heroes: Firefighter	2012	Scientifically Proven Entertainment	PC	Limited rights, currently expired.
The Good Life	2012	Immersion FX Games	PC	Worldwide rights.
Tiny Troopers	2012	Kukouri	PC, macOS	Worldwide rights.
Adam's Venture Ep3. Revelations	2012	Vertigo Games	PC	Worldwide rights, currently expired.
Zombie Apocalypse Pack	2013	Various developers	PC	Limited rights, currently expired.
Rising Storm	2013	Tripwire Interactive	PC	Limited rights.
Gas Guzzlers Extreme	2013	Gamepires	PC, Xbox One	Worldwide rights.
StarDrive	2013	Zero Sum Games	PC	Worldwide rights.
Dark Matter	2013	Interwave Studios	PC, macOS, Linux	Worldwide rights.
Endless Legend	2014	Amplitude Studios	PC, macOS	Limited rights.
Starpoint Gemini 2	2014	Little Green Men Games	PC	Worldwide rights.
Lords of the Black Sun	2014	Arkavi Studios	PC	Worldwide rights.
Horizon	2014	L3O Interactive	PC	Worldwide rights.
StarDrive 2	2015	Zero Sum Games	PC, macOS, Linux	Worldwide rights.
The Last Crown: Midnight Horror	2015	Darkling Room	PC	Worldwide rights.
Vector Thrust	2015	TimeSymmetry	PC	Worldwide rights.
Inside My Radio	2015	Seaven Studio	PC	Worldwide rights.
Ceres	2015	Jötunn Games	PC, macOS, Linux	Worldwide rights.
Killing Floor 2	2016	Tripwire Interactive	PC, PlayStation 4, Xbox One	Limited rights.
Barrow Hill: The Dark Path	2016	Shadow Tor Studios	PC	Worldwide rights.
Into the Stars	2016	Fugitive Games	PC	Worldwide rights.
Starship Corporation	2016	Coronado Games	PC	Worldwide rights.
Rising Storm 2: Vietnam	2017	Tripwire Interactive	PC	Limited rights.
Empathy: Path of Whispers	2017	Pixel Night	PC	Worldwide rights.
Stars in Shadow	2017	Ashdar Games	PC	Worldwide rights.
Starpoint Gemini Warlords	2017	Little Green Men Games	PC	Worldwide rights.
Conarium	2017	Zoetrope Interactive	PC, PlayStation 4, Xbox One, Nintendo Switch	Worldwide rights.
Dawn of Andromeda	2017	Grey Wolf Entertainment	PC	Worldwide rights.
Inmates	2017	Davit Andreasyan	PC	Worldwide rights.
Oriental Empires	2017	Shining Pixel Studios	PC	Worldwide rights.
Antigraviator	2018	Cybernetic Walrus	PC, PlayStation 4, Xbox One	Worldwide rights.
Tech Support: Error Unknown	2019	Dragon Slumber	PC	Worldwide rights.
The Sojourn	2019	Shifting Tides	PC	Worldwide rights.
Railroad Corporation	2019	Corbie Games	PC	Worldwide rights.
Pax Nova	2019	GreyWolf Entertainment	PC	Worldwide rights.
Still There	2019	GhostShark Games	PC, macOS, Nintendo Switch	Worldwide rights.
Lunacy: Saint Rhodes	2020	Lazarus Studio	PC	Worldwide rights.
Strange Horticulture	2022	Bad Viking	PC, Nintendo Switch	Worldwide rights.
Land of the Vikings	2022	Laps Games	PC	Worldwide rights.
Strange Antiquities	2025	Bad Viking	PC, Nintendo Switch	Worldwide rights.
