= Faster than the speed of light (disambiguation) =

Faster than the speed of light, or more simply faster than light, may refer to:

- Faster-than-light travel and communication
  - Superluminal motion, faster-than-light motion
  - Superluminal communication, faster-than-light communication
- FTL: Faster Than Light, a 2012 indie roguelike video game
- Faster Than the Speed of Light: The Story of a Scientific Speculation, a book by João Magueijo
- "Faster Than the Speed of Light", a song by Raven
- "Faster Than the Speed of Light", a song written by Yngwie Malmsteen
- Faster Than Light (software publisher), a defunct computer game company
- Faster Than Light, a song from the soundtrack of the 2016 video game Stellaris
- FTL Games (Faster Than Light) was the video game development division of Software Heaven Inc.

== See also ==
- Faster Than the Speed of Night, an album by Bonnie Tyler
- Speed of light (disambiguation)
- Stardrive (disambiguation), a term for FTL drive
