= Starpoint Gemini 3 =

2019 space trading and combat video game

- Developer: Little Green Men Games
- Publisher: Little Green Men Games
- Writer: Darko Macan
- Composer: Nikola Jeremić
- Engine: WhaleX
- Platform: Microsoft Windows
- Release: 5 November 2020
- Genres: Space trading and combat simulator, Role playing video game
- Mode: Single-player

Starpoint Gemini 3 is a space combat and role-playing video game developed by LGM Games and released on 5 November 2020. The game is the third installment in the Starpoint Gemini series and a direct successor to Starpoint Gemini 2. Unlike the previous installments, the game focuses on story-driven elements and aerial dogfights (which will introduce full-body NPC characters to interact with for the first time), cockpit view and modular upgrades of the ship. The story is written by Darko Macan. The game utilizes LGM's proprietary WhaleX game engine.

== Gameplay ==
The game is described as an open world, single player RPG, in which the player takes the role of Jonathan Bold, a space adventurer travelling the Gemini system. It will add two new planetary systems, apart from the existing Gemini and introduce interiors for the first time. The interiors will include bars, industrial halls and night clubs. The player's ship will be accompanied by ADAH, a digital consciousness which controls the ship's computer hardware. The player will also use a drone for exploration purposes in otherwise inaccessible areas.

== Development ==
The game had a core development team of 15 people, with additional 5 external collaborators. It entered Steam's Early Access program on 5 September 2019 and was initially set for a full release later in 2019. However, the release of the complete game ended up being delayed until 5 November 2020.

== Reception ==
In his review of the Early Access version of the game, Andrew Farrell of PCInvasion felt that the game showed significant promise, though he did criticize the character models and voice acting in their current state. Since its release, player reviews on Steam have been mixed, roughly evenly divided between positive and negative ones as of 30 November 2025.

== Music ==
The music of Starpoint Gemini was composed by Nikola Nikita Jeremić. Video game music label Materia Collective released the soundtrack on 25 February 2020.
