= Antigraviator =

2018 video game

- Developer: Cybernetic Walrus
- Publisher: Iceberg Interactive
- Engine: Unity
- Platforms: Microsoft Windows; Xbox One; PlayStation 4
- Release: Microsoft Windows; June 6, 2018; PlayStation 4 October 20, 2019; Xbox One; May 1, 2020
- Genre: Racing
- Modes: Single-player, multiplayer

Antigraviator is an anti-gravity racing video game developed by Belgian developer Cybernetic Walrus and published by Iceberg Interactive on June 6, 2018, for Microsoft Windows. It was ported to PlayStation 4 on October 29, 2019, and to Xbox One on May 1, 2020.

== Premise ==
Antigraviator's setting is described as a near future where racing has gotten very popular due to scientific breakthroughs in anti-gravity and terraforming. As a result of these breakthroughs, the antigraviator tournament was born. The anti-gravity ships used in this tournament are called 'Gravs'.

== Gameplay ==
Antigraviator is an anti-gravity racing game in the vein of Wipeout and F-Zero, to which the game has been compared. The game has a single-player mode and a multiplayer mode that supports up to eight players. The game features no speed limit, as a result the game says to be the fastest game ever made.

== Development ==
Antigraviator was expected to release in Q2 2018 for Windows PC, PlayStation 4 and Xbox One. The game developer is Belgian indie studio Cybernetic Walrus. Cybernetic Walrus is composed of alumni of Howest University in Belgium. The game is made using the Unity engine. The game was announced to receive a Kickstarter campaign in April 2017. Subsequently, the game failed to receive funding.

After the Kickstarter campaign, Dutch publisher Iceberg Interactive signed the game for a Q2 2018 multi-platform release. The game is set to be localized in English, French, German, Italian, Russian, and Simplified Chinese.

Antigraviator was developed using the Unity engine, which Unity Technologies has taken notice of. The game was selected for exhibiting at the Unite Austin 2017 Made with Unity showcase, where “unique games of varying styles, genres, mechanics, and platforms” where chosen to exhibit. Cybernetic Walrus' CEO Mike Coeck and Environment Artist Szabolcs Csizmadia was invited as a speaker to Unite Austin 2017. They gave a lecture on how the Cybernetic Walrus team used Unity 2017 to develop Antigraviator. In addition, assets from the game were used in the Unite Austin training day, where attendees learned to create an anti-gravity racing game of their own using Antigraviator's assets. The training series was later released through YouTube.

== Reception ==
Reception

Aggregate score
| Aggregator | Score |
|---|---|
| Metacritic | (PC) 65/100 (XONE) 60/100 |

Review scores
| Publication | Score |
|---|---|
| Destructoid | 7/10 |
| Push Square | 4/10 |

Antigraviator received "mixed or average" reviews, according to review aggregator website Metacritic.

Destructoid reviewed the game positively while noting that Antigraviator's attempts to differentiate itself from other games of its genre failed to add to the overall package, and wrote, "The track design is solid, the sense of speed is great, and controls are tight and feel familiar for anyone who’s played a racing game." Push Square, by contrast, disliked the game due to its unwieldy handling, dysfunctional trap system, and poor presentation in spite of its sense of speed and variety of modes.
