= Starpoint Gemini Warlords =

2017 space trading and combat video game

- Developer: Little Green Men Games
- Publisher: Iceberg Interactive (Note: Xbox One version self-published by Little Green Men Games.)
- Composer: Nikola Nikita Jeremić
- Platforms: Microsoft Windows, Xbox One
- Release: Windows; 23 May 2017; Xbox One; 9 February 2018
- Genres: Space trading and combat simulator, role-playing, 4X
- Mode: Single-player

Starpoint Gemini Warlords is a blend of space trading and combat simulator, role-playing and 4X video game developed by Croatian-based Little Green Men Games and published by Iceberg Interactive. Starpoint Gemini Warlords is a spin-off title to the space sim Starpoint Gemini 2, which was released in 2014.

== Development ==
Little Green Men Games developed Starpoint Gemini 2 based on the community feedback and suggestions in the Steam Early Access program. Although most of the popular suggestions made it in the game, some of the ideas could not be implemented in Starpoint Gemini 2. The feature requests not suitable for Starpoint Gemini 2 were kept on a wishlist and became the base of the new spin-off title Starpoint Gemini Warlords. Just like its predecessor, Starpoint Gemini Warlords went through Early Access where the developers implemented feature suggestions from their community and changed the game according to their feedback. The game was scheduled to stay approximately 6 to 12 months in Steam Early Access and was finished and released after 11 months. It was released for Windows via Steam on 23 May 2017 and for Xbox One on 9 February 2018.

== Features ==
Starpoint Gemini Warlords is a role-playing space sim with a 4X layer. Players can captain various space ships ranging from gunships to carriers and give orders to war fleets on the strategy map. The game takes place in the Gemini System and features pre-scripted story missions (Campaign) and a free roam mode (Conquest).

== Release ==
Starpoint Gemini Warlords was released on May 23, 2017, on Steam and GoG in two versions - Standard and Deluxe Edition. Deluxe Edition includes 160 page full color Artbook, Original Game Soundtrack composed by Nikola Nikita Jeremić, selection of wallpapers and Twitch Overlays.

== Reception ==
The game received mixed to positive reviews and currently holds an aggregated score of 73 on Metacritic, based on 11 reviews, and a score of 70% on Gamerankings, based on 6 reviews.

Reception

Aggregate scores
Aggregator	Score
GameRankings	(PC) 70/100
Metacritic	(PC) 73/100

=== Sales ===
The game sold more than 200,000 copies.
