= Dark Fall =

2002 video game

- North American cover art
- Developer: XXv Productions
- Publishers: XXv Productions; The Adventure Company (WW); Darkling Room ("Pins & Needles" Edition); Iceberg Interactive (Adventures in Terror)
- Designer: Jonathan Boakes
- Programmer: Jonathan Boakes
- Writer: Jonathan Boakes
- Composers: Kevin MacNaughton; Michael Ivans
- Platform: Windows
- Release: UK: April 2002; NA: July 23, 2003; "Pins & Needles" Edition: WW: March 31, 2009; Adventures in Terror: WW: December 11, 2009
- Genres: Adventure, psychological horror
- Mode: Single-player

Dark Fall is a 2002 first-person psychological horror/adventure game developed and independently published for Microsoft Windows by Jonathan Boakes, under the XXv Productions label. After the independent release proved a success, with the game selling well and generating good word-of-mouth, The Adventure Company purchased the rights, releasing it worldwide in 2003 under the title Dark Fall - The Journal. The game was re-released twice in 2009. Firstly, by Boakes' own company, Darkling Room, in a limited "Pins & Needles" edition, and later by Iceberg Interactive, as part of their Adventures in Terror: British Horror Collection. The game was made available on Steam in December 2013.

The game tells the story of an unnamed protagonist who receives a frightened message from his brother asking for help. Encountering an ancient evil known as the Dark Fall, which traps souls between the realm of the living and the dead and feeds off their pain, the protagonist must attempt to imprison it before he too is overcome by its power.

Dark Fall received mixed reviews with critics praising the individual work put into the game by Boakes and finding the tone of the game unsettling. Common criticisms included poor graphics and an over-reliance on finding notes to progress the story. The game was followed by three further Dark Fall games. Dark Fall II - Lights Out tells an unrelated story to the first game, although it does feature a recurring minor character. Dark Fall - Lost Souls also tells a relatively unrelated story, although it is set in the same location and features several of the supporting characters from the original game. Dark Fall - Ghost Vigil tells a new story, featuring a ghost hunting paranormal team investigating Harwood House, but reflects game play elements from Dark Fall - The Journal, whilst also connecting The Lost Crown game by the same author.

== Gameplay ==
The player uses a ghost hunting device in Dark Fall. The image shows the simple HUD. Items acquired by the player are shown in the "Activity Bar" across the top. The cursor is towards the lower right in its neutral style.

Dark Fall is a first-person psychological horror/adventure game, which employs a very simple HUD. At the top of the screen is the "Activity Bar." On the left side of the bar are items which the player has acquired during the game. On the right, are buttons which allow the player to save their game, quit their game, or load a previously saved game.

The game uses a basic point-and-click interface to move the player around and manipulate the game world, which is presented entirely through static pre-rendered images. As the player moves the cursor around the screen it can change into different styles depending on the situation; neutral cursor (no interaction is possible), an arrow (the player can move in the direction indicated), a finger (indicating an item with which the player can directly interact), a wrench (the player must use an inventory item to initiate interaction), a magnifying glass (an area which can be examined in more detail), backwards arrow (the player can move backwards whilst facing the same direction; i.e. they do not have to turn around).

Much of the gameplay is based around solving puzzles (such as translating an encrypted message, or opening a puzzle box). However, unlike most modern adventure games, Dark Fall does not keep note of any information or clues acquired by the player (for example, notes found by the player are not entered into the inventory, and journal entries read by the player are not recorded in any way). This forces the player to keep track of every clue and detail themselves. If the player wishes to recheck a journal entry, they must find the journal and re-read it.

== Plot ==
"Somewhere in the recesses of time, a darkness is growing in strength. A force that existed at the very beginning of time and will exist until the very end of time, waiting to break into our world."

The game begins on April 29, with the player Mr. Crowhurst (whose first name remains unknown) receiving a message from his brother, Pete Crowhurst, an architect working on the redevelopment of an abandoned Railway hotel in Dowerton, Dorset. Pete pleads for his brother to come to Dowerton, as something is wrong and he needs help. He mentions he is working with two ghost hunters, and says "I think whatever they were hunting has found them. I think it's found me, too." He then says "it" is outside the door, whispering his name, and he feels compelled to let it in. As the message ends, a door is heard opening.

The player heads to Dowerton by train. He falls asleep, and awakens in a train tunnel, where he hears the voice of a young boy, Timothy Pike. The boy guides him to the station, telling him he has lived in the area "since 41," and mentioning "the others are hoping you can help them. One of them knows you, your brother ain't it? He's the new one, only just arrived." He also says "it" doesn't know they're talking yet, but soon will. The player finds Pete's PDA, in which he writes about Nigel Danvers and Polly White, the ghost hunters. As the player explores the hotel, he discovers why it originally closed; its reputation never recovered from the night of April 29, 1947, when the guests and staff vanished.

As the player explores, it becomes apparent the area is haunted by the spirits of the people who vanished in 1947, amongst others (including a Roundhead soldier who died in the original inn during the English Civil War, Timothy, Polly, Nigel and Pete). The player learns George Crabtree, the owner of the hotel in 1947, was suspected of murdering the others and then fleeing. However, Crabtree had learned of an evil in the hotel and was planning to imprison it by using twelve symbols to recite an incantation. Each symbol was on a piece of vellum, which he distributed amongst the staff and guests, most of whom thought he was mad.

The player discovers "it" is known as the Dark Fall, and was accidentally released by Crabtree and his friend Arthur while they were in the cellar trying to solve the mystery of the disappearance of the soldier from the Civil War. In his journal, Crabtree writes,

It is not our fault, it can not be our fault. We were not to know. The chamber. It is not as we, or anyone, could understand. It is both extraordinary and baffling. Beyond faith and beyond reason. There is a power. A rippling energy that plays across its walls and ceiling. It is a godless power, and had no place in our world. A thousand voices whispered at us from beyond the stones. A thousand voices in perpetual confusion. We removed ourselves as quickly as possible. I fear it was not fast enough. There was time, just enough time. A splinter in fact. Enough for something to follow us back through the passage. Darkness with no form, or existence.

Arthur enlisted in the army, and was killed during World War II, but Crabtree worked to re-imprison the Dark Fall. In a journal entry dated April 29, 1947, he writes he is ready to use the symbols to recite the incantation. The player also finds Polly's electronic journal, in which she writes Nigel discovered a secret room in the cellar. However, several days later, they feel a "conscious" presence outside their door; Polly hears it calling her name, but Nigel hears it calling his. In her last entry, dated April 29, she says Nigel disappeared as they were fleeing from the cellar, and although she was able to get back to their room, she has decided to go out and look for Nigel and Pete.

The player ultimately finds his way into the antechamber and discovers the final journal entries of Crabtree, who speculates the Dark Fall may be connected to Hela, the being appointed by the Norse god Odin to guard the souls of the dead, but writes "if so, I fear that this 'guardian' gave up watching over the dead, and has acquired a taste for the living." He had come to believe the Dark Fall sustains itself on the pain of the souls it has trapped. In his final entry, Crabtree worries he may be incapable of imprisoning it.

The player enters the central chamber, resisting the Dark Fall, and recites the incantation, imprisoning it, and releasing the trapped souls. Timothy thanks him, and before he departs, tells him things may not have turned out as he thinks. All evidence of the spirits trapped by the Dark Fall throughout history disappear. The game then cuts back to the opening scene, as the player receives a message from Pete. In the message, Pete begins by saying he has something very important to tell his brother, but then forgets why he rang, and says the redevelopment of the hotel is going well, and he will be home shortly.

== Development and release ==
Dark Fall was written, designed and programmed by Jonathan Boakes, who was working as a sushi chef at the time. He first got the idea for the game whilst exploring a real abandoned train station and adjoining hotel in Dorset in January 2000. The buildings were sealed shut with corrugated iron, but rusted peepholes allowed him to look inside and determine they had been quite opulent in their day, and had last been used in the late 1940s. Upon further investigation, he discovered one of the doors of the train station was so rotted, the weight of the iron had pulled it partly off its hinges, and he was able to get inside and explore the buffet room.

Upon returning to his nearby B&B, he asked the owner, a man named Crabtree, about the hotel and station, but he knew nothing of their history, simply that they were there. It was this air of mystery that first led Boakes to consider a video game in such a setting. He was also inspired by the Sapphire & Steel serial "The Railway Station", which was set in an abandoned train station and featured "two existential 'time agents' [who] visited an old railway station to get to the bottom of a 'time rip'. Something was bringing the dead back into our world as embittered spirits."

When he got back to London, he wrote a narrative outline of his proposed game, which he ultimately developed into an unpublished short story called "Dark Fall". At the same time, he started building locations for the game using macromedia software. On Easter Sunday, he returned to Dorset with a camera, a video camera and tin foil for collecting samples, determined to get further into the buildings. However, he was shocked to discover they were gone; demolished to make way for a housing estate. As such, he had to rely on his imagination to create everything, with the exception of the buffet room, which he based on the actual room he had explored, and the caves under the hotel, which were partly inspired by the Dan yr Ogof caves in Wales.

Boakes worked on the game for eighteen months, almost entirely on his own. All of the sound effects in the game were recorded in his own house, and enhanced using Sound Forge. Graphically, the game is presented entirely through pre-rendered static images, some of which feature limited animation. When the game was complete, Boakes published it independently under the XXv Productions label, making only 2000 copies. Although approached by two publishing companies interested in the game, Boakes chose to sell it independently online, where it soon began to attract positive reviews, and generate good word-of-mouth. Boakes was later approached by The Adventure Company, who signed a deal to distribute it globally, renamed Dark Fall: The Journal.

In March 2009, Boakes' own company, Darkling Room, published a special Limited "Pins & Needles" Edition, containing Dark Fall: The Journal and the director's cut of Dark Fall II: Lights Out, walkthroughs for each game, a collection of ghost stories and a Dark Fall soundtrack CD. Limited to 300 copies, each is individually numbered, and signed by Boakes. In December 2009, Iceberg Interactive, who had purchased the rights to the series from The Adventure Company, published Adventures in Terror: British Horror Collection, containing Dark Fall: The Journal, the director's cut of Dark Fall: Lights Out and Shadow Tor Studios' Barrow Hill.

== Reception ==
Reception

Aggregate score
Aggregator	Score
Metacritic	68/100

Review scores
Publication	Score
Adventure Gamers	3.5/5
Computer Gaming World	4/5
GameSpot	6.4/10
GameSpy	2/5
IGN	7.8/10
PC Gamer (UK)	56%
PC Gamer (US)	61%
Computer Games Magazine	3.5/5

In March 2004, Lorraine Lue of DreamCatcher Interactive Europe reported that Dark Fall "kind of surprised us because it is selling very well worldwide, including Germany and the UK." She attributed this partly to the game's use of atmosphere, rather than violence, to generate fear. In North America, Dark Fall sold 17,828 retail copies during 2003, and another 5,432 in the first two months of 2004. The game received "mixed or average reviews" upon its general release in 2003. It holds an aggregate score of 68 out of 100 on Metacritic, based on twenty-three reviews.

IGN's Staci Krause scored the game 7.8 out of 10, writing "It is rare that a PC game, especially a point and click adventure, can give you that edge of your seat feel. Dark Fall: The Journal, definitely does this. Although it's not the most technologically advanced of games, it has a gripping story coupled with subtle nuances that add a dimension of fear to the experience. Add in some puzzles and a lot of investigating and what you have is a pretty decent game."

Adventure Gamers' Evan Dickens was the first professional critic to review the game when Boakes independently released it in 2002. Dickens scored it 3.5 out of 5, writing "it shows the dedication of a true adventure fan to his genre and the elements that make an adventure game such an enjoyable experience." He also praised the atmosphere of the game; "The best part of Dark Fall is summarized in one word: atmosphere. This game demands that you turn off the lights and turn up the speakers. Boakes has succeeded masterfully at creating a world that is truly creepy." He concluded "It's clear that this is not a big-budget professional game that has been beta tested by large groups. There are small annoyances, such as not being able to skip the intro sequence if you select New Game. These are minor quibbles, though, and do not take away from the fact that Dark Fall is involving and intriguing."

GameSpot's Scott Osborne scored it 6.4 out of 10, criticizing the low graphical and sound quality, and writing "Dark Fall breaks no new ground and puts too much emphasis on puzzles, but its meticulously detailed world and paranormal detective story generally keep things entertaining." Of the general gameplay, he wrote, "the game puts too much emphasis on puzzle solving, and some of the puzzles, while quite interesting because of their intricate detail and diversity, can be too obscure and perplexing. It's also a shame that the game so often relies on the old adventure-game cliché of telling its story through clues offered by written materials."

GameSpy's Tom Chick scored it 2 out of 5. He was critical of some of the puzzles; "It's driven by the sort of maddening adventure game logic that had a hand in killing the genre. But there's no denying this is part of what defined the genre: clever (and often implausible) solutions from some weird corner of the brain most of us never exercise." He praised the detailed backstory, artwork, atmosphere and sound effects, but criticised the navigation and the graphics; "It's old-school gaming at its worst in terms of the limitations of the technology. Dark Fall takes place exclusively on static screens with limited interaction and minimal movement or animation. It's the sort of game where you know early on you're never going to interact with anyone because the engine just won't support it."

The editors of Computer Gaming World nominated Dark Fall for their 2003 "Adventure Game of the Year" award, which ultimately went to Uplink: Hacker Elite. In 2011, Adventure Gamers named Dark Fall the 86th-best adventure game ever released.
