= StarDrive 2 =

2015 video game

- Developer: Zero Sum Games
- Publisher: Iceberg Interactive
- Platforms: Microsoft Windows, macOS, Linux
- Release: April 9, 2015
- Genre: 4X
- Mode: Single-player

StarDrive 2 is a 4X video game developed by Zero Sum Games. It is the sequel to StarDrive. Iceberg Interactive released it in 2015.

== Gameplay ==
StarDrive 2 has gameplay similar to Master of Orion II. Players choose a race, build a space empire, and conquer the rest of the galaxy. Races can be customized using a system similar to character points, where selecting powerful advantages needs to be offset by taking penalties. The game is turn-based except during space battles. When invading a planet, players engage in a turn-based tactics minigame where their soldiers fight against the planet's defenders. Diplomacy between empires is limited by what the populations will allow, and populations can grow xenophobic if they feel too much trade has taken place, leading to war. Each time the player makes a research breakthrough, they are presented with several choices of technologies. They may only choose one at each breakthrough, and the ones not chosen become unavailable except through trade or spying.

== Development ==
Iceberg Interactive released the game on April 9, 2015.

== Reception ==
StarDrive 2 received mixed reviews on Metacritic. Leif Johnson of PC Gamer wrote, "Both land and space combat lack punch, but there's a fun if predictable 4X game waiting underneath." Nick Capozzoli of GameSpot wrote that the game's 4X core is competent but has been done better by other games. In his review for IGN, Rob Zacny wrote, "StarDrive 2's ship building is top notch, but the flawed game surrounding it keeps it from ever truly shining." Although he praised the game's ship combat, Fraser Brown of PCGamesN criticized its "annoying tone, eccentric AI and the shallowness of the empire management".
