= Dark Matter (video game) =

2013 survivor horror video game

- Developer: Interwave Studios
- Publisher: Iceberg Interactive
- Engine: Unity
- Platforms: Windows, Linux, macOS
- Release: October 17, 2013
- Genres: Platform game, survival horror
- Mode: Single-player

Dark Matter is an indie metroidvania/survival horror video game developed by Interwave Studios and published by Iceberg Interactive for the Windows, Linux and macOS in 2013.

== Development ==
Interwave Studios intended the game to be developed by a team of six and completed within a year. It was clear that one year into production, the game was not in a complete state. With funds running low, Interwave launched a Kickstarter crowdfunding campaign in June 2013, hoping to raise £50,000. The campaign failed, leading to the development team being laid off that summer.

The game was released in a truncated form in October 2013, offering four levels, and with its ending missing. The intention was that sales of the game could fund the rehiring of the development staff. Both the management team at Interwave and the publishers at Iceberg were unaware that the ending was missing, and temporarily pulled the game from Steam in response. A cinematic ending was patched into the game later that October.

== Reception ==
Dark Matter received negative reviews from critics, such as a review score of 4/10 from GameSpot. Reviewers and players criticized the game's abrupt ending, leading to refunds being offered by GOG and the game being temporarily pulled from Steam.
