= Strange Antiquities =

2025 video game

- Developer: Bad Viking
- Publisher: Iceberg Interactive
- Designers: Rob Donkin; John Donkin
- Programmer: Rob Donkin
- Artist: John Donkin
- Composer: Benjamin Young
- Platforms: Nintendo Switch; Windows
- Release: WW: September 17, 2025
- Genre: Adventure
- Mode: Single-player

Strange Antiquities is a 2025 adventure video game developed by Bad Viking and published by Iceberg Interactive. It is a followup to Bad Viking's previous game, Strange Horticulture. Players run an occult shop and assist customers by solving puzzles.

== Gameplay ==
Players control an assistant at an occult shop in a fictional city. Customers come to the shop with issues they need resolved, such as lifting a curse. To help customers, players must figure out what artifact in the store will address the customer's problem. An occult encyclopedia assists players with information, such as informing players how a helpful item might look or feel. Players would then have to find an item in the shop that satisfies those clues. When stuck, they can ask the game for hints. Players are told if they have chosen correctly when selling the item to the customer. Choosing incorrectly too many times forces players to play a minigame. Players can also explore the city during story-based quests and find new artifacts. Eventually, they are asked to solve a city-wide problem. Choices made during gameplay can affect how this is resolved.

== Development ==
Developer Bad Viking is based in the United Kingdom. Iceberg Interactive released Strange Antiquities for Windows and Switch on September 17, 2025.

== Reception ==
Reception

Aggregate score
Aggregator	Score
OpenCritic	92% recommend (Note: Based on 25 reviews)

Strange Antiquities received positive reviews on Metacritic. PC Gamer said Strange Horticulture felt more fresh and had a better story, but they still enjoyed Strange Antiquities. In particular, they praised the puzzle solving, which they said made them feel like a detective. They concluded that it is a "great cozy yet creepy puzzle adventure". Rock Paper Shotgun found the midgame to be the most fun. Although they said the quests outside the shop were well-written, they said they had difficulty keeping track of plot elements that were constantly interrupted by the main shop-running game mechanic. Regardless, they said the puzzles were so much fun it was one of their favorite puzzle games of 2025. Playing on the Switch, Nintendo Life felt the user interface was somewhat PC-centric, but they enjoyed the puzzles and story. Polygon called it "a delightful deduction game" and praised its ability to virtualize the joys of antiquing.
