= Little Green Men Games =

Croatian video game developer

- Company type: Private
- Industry: Video games
- Founded: 2006
- Headquarters: Zagreb, Croatia
- Area served: Worldwide
- Key people: Mario Mihokovic (CEO); Zeljko Kos (main programmer, CTO); Tomislav Mihokovic (lead 3D artist); Danijel Mihokovic (lead scripter and designer)
- Products: Starpoint Gemini; Starpoint Gemini 2 Starpoint Gemini Warlords; Starpoint Gemini 3
- Revenue: HRK 4.86 million (2017) (≈US$ 730,000)
- Number of employees: 18 (2017)
- Website: www.lgmgames.net

Little Green Men Games (doing business as Intercorona d.o.o) is a Croatian video game developer. The company began in 2006 with producing its first video game Starpoint Gemini developed with custom made engine called IC Whale Engine in 2010. Their second game Starpoint Gemini 2 was released in 2014, followed by 3 downloadable content (Secrets of Aethera, Origins and Titans), made with LGM Games' proprietary Whale2 Engine. The latest installment in the franchise, Starpoint Gemini Warlords was released on May 23, 2017 on Steam and GoG (DRM free). It uses the proprietary Whale 2.5 engine.

== History ==
Little Green Men Games studio has been established in late 2006 in Zagreb, Croatia. The following year marked the start of the production of the first independent game – Starpoint Gemini. This tactical space RPG simulator was released in December 2010, and was created by four enthusiasts with almost no budget. In the second half of 2011, development of Starpoint Gemini 2 was initiated. The game was designed on the heavily upgraded Whale 2 engine that had been modified to use DirectX 11 functions and streaming universe. The engine itself is completely designed and executed as a result of in-house effort. Starpoint Gemini 2 was released on Steam Early Access in September 2013, and one year later, in September 2014 went to full release, digital and retail alike. Starpoint Gemini Warlords was released on Steam Early Access in April 2016 and in 11 months, in May 2017 went to full release.

At some point after 2020 and the release of Starpoint Gemini 3, Little Green Men Games renamed themselves to Overseer Studios, going on to release Patron (video game) in 2021, Aquatico in 2023 and Kaiserpunk in 2025.

== Goals ==
The goal of Little Green Men studio is creation of independent games, based on the latest technology and gradually expanding the team in order to tackle more extensive and demanding projects. LGM also develops its software to utilize VR technology, such as Oculus Rift.

== Awards ==
In 2014, LGM participated in their first Developer Conference (Reboot Develop – Zagreb 2014 ) as a nominee in the indie category, and won the award for best regional indie project that same year.

== Steam Early Access ==
The team finished their latest game, a community-driven project, Starpoint Gemini Warlords. The game was released to Early Access on April 14, 2016 and left Early Access May 23, 2017. It features the core mechanics from Starpoint Gemini 2, but introduces many new features like owning and upgrading your headquarters, conquering parts of the universe, deploying fleets and a much bigger universe (about nine times bigger than in Starpoint Gemini 2).

After the full release, the game received positive reviews from both critics and users and was called "Mount & Blade in space" by Gamewatcher portal.

LGM Games Starpoint Gemini 2 has been considered one of the best Steam Early Access games that were later released successfully.

After the full release, the game received mostly positive reviews and LGM released 3 more DLC's for the game (Secrets of Aethera, Origins and Titans). Origins is considered to be one of the biggest free DLCs ever released, since it includes the complete original Starpoint Gemini campaign in a new engine.

== Games ==
- Starpoint Gemini (Dec 2010)
  - Starpoint Gemini: Timebreach (Oct 2012)
- Starpoint Gemini 2 (Sep 2014)
  - Starpoint Gemini 2: Secrets of Aethera (Feb 2015)
  - Starpoint Gemini 2: Origins (Jul 2015)
  - Starpoint Gemini 2: Titans (Nov 2015)
- Starpoint Gemini Warlords (May 2017)
- Starpoint Gemini 3 (2019)
