= Tiny Troopers =

2012 video game

- Developer: Kukouri Mobile Entertainment
- Publishers: Chillingo; Iceberg Interactive; Game Troopers
- Engine: Unity
- Platforms: iOS, Android, Windows, OS X, Windows Phone
- Release: iOS: WW: June 7, 2012; Windows, OS X: WW: August 24, 2012
- Genre: Multidirectional shooter
- Mode: Single-player

Tiny Troopers is a top-down squad-based multidirectional shooter developed by Finnish studio Kukouri Mobile Entertainment and published by Chillingo, Iceberg Interactive and Game Troopers. It was released on 7 June 2012 for iOS and on 24 August 2012 for PC. The game is available on iOS, Android, Windows, OS X and Windows Phone. The game puts you in command of a team of troopers (soldiers) which are guided through various objectives in 30 levels of increasing difficulty.

== Gameplay ==
Tiny Troopers uses a tapping/clicking system to move and shoot enemies and enemy buildings to complete a mission. A drag and drop mechanism is used to activate special weapons such as grenades, bazookas, and airstrikes. During each level, the player will face various challenges and will be required to complete objectives such as freeing hostages, protecting journalists, survival and eliminating enemy troops. Before starting a mission, a player may select the difficulty of that mission and purchase upgrades using "command points" and medals. Players are also given a mission briefing stating the objective of the level and can suggest which specialist(s) to hire for the next mission. Troops that survive a level will be promoted and will subsequently become stronger, while troops that are killed will be replaced by new recruits and the Command Points gained by the fallen troop are subsequently forfeited. During a mission, the player can use the support menu to call for drop packages such as med-packs, grenades, an airborne (only after taking casualties), bazookas, airstrikes or an intel pack which reveals the location of enemies and collectibles on the map to be deployed. The player also has the opportunity to check the objectives of the mission on the map.

Command points are a form of currency that can be obtained and accumulated by killing enemy units, enemy buildings, completing missions or picking up collectibles during gameplay. However, command points can also be purchased using real-world money through in-app purchases. Medals are used to unlock new training packages, which permanently increase the characteristics of your soldiers. They can be collected during gameplay by completing missions, or obtained through in-app purchases using real-world money.

In "zombie mode", the objective is to survive waves of zombies. As each wave is completed, larger numbers of stronger zombies spawn. The game supplies the user with medipacks and airdrops containing special weapons such as grenades, airstrikes, and bazookas. Unlocked soldiers are enclosed in barricaded areas and can be freed as the waves progress to increase the size of your squad.

== Development ==
Kukouri Mobile Entertainment was inspired by the 1993 video game Cannon Fodder. The game was released on iOS on June 7, 2012, It was ported to Windows and Macintosh on August 24, 2012.

== Reception ==
Tiny Troopers

Aggregate score
Aggregator	Score	
Aggregator	iOS	PC
Metacritic	81/100	57/100

Review scores
Publication	Score	
Publication	iOS	PC
GameSpot		5/10
Gamezebo	4.5/5	
Pocket Gamer	3/5	

Tiny Troopers received mixed reviews for the Windows version and positive reviews for iOS.

Gamezebo's Al Dellinger was generally impressed by Tiny Troopers. However, he felt that because the player cannot control troops individually, one might seldom get stuck behind an obstacle. Dellinger also suggests that the humor is not for everyone, as certain moments feel too "real" for the game, like when a shot enemy is still alive on the ground asking for a mercy-kill. In conclusion, Dellinger says "this is an excellent title. It's a blast, the controls are smooth, and the missions are unique."

Pocket Gamer's Harry Slater thought "Tiny Troopers isn't interesting enough to hold your attention for very long". He felt the game did not include enough tactical decisions and detaches yourself from feeling as if you are part of an elite squad. Both Slater and Dellinger feel that a formation option would come in handy to split the squad around enemy flanks.

GameSpot's Nathan Meunier feels the game is better suited for mobile devices. He mentions that the control actions on the PC are not as smooth as it is on mobile. To activate special weapons, the user has to press the Ctrl key to temporarily toggle your special weapon which makes it difficult while trying to shoot and maneuver around at the same time. However, Meunier feels positive about "the way power-ups tie directly into the scoring mechanic. Racking up kills and collecting loot earns you command points that you can spend to temporarily boost your fighting capabilities and call in reinforcements".
