= Gemini Wars =

2012 video game

- Developer: Camel101
- Publisher: Iceberg Interactive
- Platforms: Windows, Mac OS X
- Release: June 8, 2012
- Genre: Real-time strategy
- Modes: Single-player, multiplayer

Gemini Wars is a 2012 space real-time strategy computer game developed by American studio Camel101.

== History ==
Gemini Wars was released for Windows and Mac OS X on June 8, 2012.

== Story ==
Players control a fleet commander that rises up through the ranks of the US Federation Forces. Beginning with a small group of frigates, they must control battleships, carriers, and planetary bases throughout space battles and boarding actions. Players can also build space stations with orbital facilities to fortify their position, build their fleet, extract minerals and research upgrades. Players must execute all boarding actions using Marine Special Forces and will have to bombard enemies with long-range cannons.

== Reception ==
Reception

Aggregate scores
Aggregator	Score
GameRankings	51.50%
Metacritic	53%

Gemini Wars received generally "mixed or negative" reviews, according to review aggregator Metacritic. Critics took issue with the slow pace, bugs and lack of a multiplayer mode but some praised the story. Destructoid called it frustrating while XGN said "Players who love RTS games with a nice story will however enjoy Gemini Wars."
