= Dark Fall: Lost Souls =

2009 video game

- Developer: Darkling Room
- Publisher: Iceberg Interactive
- Designer: Jonathan Boakes
- Writer: Jonathan Boakes
- Composers: Jonathan Boakes; Ben Gammons
- Engine: Wintermute Engine
- Platform: Microsoft Windows
- Release: Download: WW: 13 November 2009; Retail: EU: 29 January 2010; NA: 21 April 2010
- Genres: First-person adventure, psychological horror
- Mode: Single-player

Dark Fall: Lost Souls is a 2009 first-person psychological horror/adventure game developed by British studio Darkling Room and published by Iceberg Interactive for Microsoft Windows. It was first released for download via Steam and Darkling Room's official website in November 2009. It was subsequently released for retail in Europe in January 2010, and in North America in April. Lost Souls is the third game in the Dark Fall series, following Dark Fall (2002) and Dark Fall II: Lights Out (2004). It tells a story relatively unrelated to either, although it is set in the same location and features several of the supporting characters from the first game.

Lost Souls tells the story of The Inspector, a disgraced former police officer who has never been able to forget the last case on which he worked; the disappearance of an eleven-year-old girl named Amy Haven from the town of Dowerton, Dorset. The Inspector was convinced a vagrant named Mr. Bones had killed Amy, but was unable to prove it, and so planted evidence. However, the local newspaper discovered his ruse, and the case against Bones fell apart. He was released, and Amy's trail went cold. Her parents subsequently blamed The Inspector for the police's failure to find her, and he was fired. Now, on the fifth anniversary of her disappearance, he has come to the abandoned ruins of Dowerton train station and hotel after local children reported seeing Amy in the vicinity.

Lost Souls did not receive a great deal of attention in the mainstream gaming press, with limited coverage from professional critics. However, what reviews it did receive were mainly positive, with critics praising the atmosphere, plot and sound design, and most finding it the scariest game in the Dark Fall series. The most common criticism was that some of the puzzles were too obscure.

== Gameplay ==
Items in the inventory are laid out across the bottom of the screen. The Inspector's mobile phone is on the left side of the screen, If the player clicks on the top of the phone, the entire phone appears in the display, allowing access to various options.

Lost Souls is a first-person psychological horror/adventure game, which employs a simple HUD. A bar at the bottom of the screen serves as the inventory, storing items which the player has acquired during the game. The bar also allows access to The Inspector's mobile phone, from which the player can save their game, quit their game, or load a previously saved game. The mobile phone also allows the player to illuminate dark areas using the phone's flashlight, read any text messages received by The Inspector during the game, change the difficulty level, and turn on and off subtitles.

The game uses a basic point-and-click interface to move the player around and manipulate the game world. As the player moves the cursor around the screen it can change into different styles depending on the situation; neutral cursor (no interaction is possible), a hand (an item with which the player can interact), a finger (the player can move, turn or look in the direction indicated), a wrench (the player must use an inventory item to initiate interaction), a magnifying glass (an area which can be examined in more detail).

Much of the gameplay is based around solving puzzles. However, unlike most modern adventure games, Lost Souls does not keep note of any information or clues acquired by the player (for example, notes found by the player are not entered into the inventory, and documents read by the player are not recorded in any way). This forces the player to keep track of every clue and detail themselves. If the player wishes to recheck a document, they must find it and re-read it.

== Plot ==
The game is set in the same abandoned train station and hotel in Dowerton, Dorset as the first Dark Fall game, and takes place on the night of 5 November. The protagonist of the game is "The Inspector", a disgraced former police officer who was dismissed from the force after tampering with evidence in the case of a missing eleven-year-old girl, Amy Haven. The Inspector was convinced a local vagrant known as Mr. Bones had killed Amy, but was unable to prove it, and so planted evidence. The local newspaper broke the story, the case against Bones fell apart, and Amy's trail went cold, with her parents blaming The Inspector for the police's failure to find her. It is now five years to the day since Amy went missing, and The Inspector has come to Dowerton Station after local teenagers reported seeing Amy in the vicinity.

The game begins in a train tunnel as The Inspector receives a text message from "Echo" telling him "You are not alone. I am near." The Inspector finds a note written by Mr. Bones saying he wishes he knew where Amy was, as she was his only friend. As he explores the tunnel, he thinks he hears a train coming, despite the tunnel being blocked off. He panics, faints, and awakens near the train station. Inside, he sees the ghost of both the station master and, subsequently, Amy herself. He then gets a phone call from Amy, who asks him to come to her birthday party on the top floor, which will be attended by her "sisters."

As he explores the station, he finds various newspaper clippings revealing teen crime in the area is at an all-time high, with teenagers practising satanic rituals ever since Amy disappeared, claiming they are doing so at her behest. Amy herself had been expelled from school for her mood swings and what was perceived as an unhealthy interest in the occult. The Inspector also finds a letter that indicates Amy and Mr. Bones were attempting to communicate with the dead. In the hotel, The Inspector sees his own name in the guestbook, accompanied by a note saying that he will be staying for "a very long time."

In a room in the hotel, he sees a "Shadowkin" crawl out from the floor and attempt to attack him. He has a flash of an operating theater, with a doctor exclaiming "We're losing him," before seeing his interrogation of Bones playing on a TV. During the interrogation, Bones says Amy is in a better place, and is with her "angels" now, who came to her "in a dark light." The Inspector encounters several more Shadowkins, and continues to get text messages from Echo. It soon becomes apparent the messages from Echo are helping The Inspector, pointing him in the right direction.

As he explores, he encounters several souls trapped in the hotel. To free the guests, The Inspector must perform a task for them, and kill the "Life Leech" keeping them imprisoned. If The Inspector touches a Leech directly, he has a series of flashes of a drug overdose. Once each spirit has been freed, they give The Inspector a valuable item, and offer him advice. One warns him Amy is "darkness itself." Another tells him Amy and her "sisters" are evil, and warns him to "beware the Dark Fall." Eventually, The Inspector finds a skeleton in a water tower; that of John Lovell, the gardener at Amy's school. Lovell is actually the real name of Mr. Bones.

The Inspector subsequently learns that he himself murdered Mr. Bones, convinced of his guilt, but unable to prove it. Shortly thereafter, Echo reveals he is actually The Inspector's conscience. The Inspector heads to the top floor, and enters a room which transforms into the room where he interrogated Bones. Amy appears and tells The Inspector she wants to go home, but someone must stay behind in her place to look after her sisters, who are in fact three dolls. The player has the choice of remaining behind or leaving. If the player stays, Amy says "the Dark Fall is now," and The Inspector is consumed by the Darkness as Amy laughs. If the player refuses to stay, The Inspector wakes up on an operating table as a doctor assures him he is going to be okay. In the background, Amy can be heard laughing.

== Development ==
As with both the original Dark Fall and the sequel, Dark Fall II: Lights Out, Jonathan Boakes worked primarily alone on Lost Souls, writing, designing and programming the game, as well as voicing several characters, designing the sound effects (with Matt Clark), and composing the music (with Ben Gammons). Boakes has said he prefers working on the Dark Fall games without a development team as "the worlds of Dowerton and Fetch Rock are created from an informed imagination, using textures and sounds from the world around me. I think a little of that personality would be lost if tackled by a small team." Of Lost Souls, he felt working alone helped him establish the game's atmosphere of isolation; "working alone in the dim light of the Darkling Room is the best way to approach this game [...] It's an eerie, isolating experience."

In relation to why he chose to return to Dowerton for the third Dark Fall game, Boakes explains

I love that old train station and hotel. It was a grotty pleasure to work there, back in 2001, and it is proving to be a derelict delight, once again. The Dark Fall 'world' was based upon several locations – some real, some based in other fiction – and seems to capture many aspects of what people believe English train stations to feel like. They exhibit a kind of fallen grandeur, of a more industrial and vital time, long since passed. It's the perfect place to tell a ghost story, as people are not supposed to stop and stay in those places. They should not stay for a long period of time. But the Dark Fall characters do stay there, through no choice of their own.

In terms of the game's plot, he states

I do not go as far as to name, or classify, what the Dark Fall actually is. That would be rather foolish. To name and explain the force would defeat the object of the game; that being to present a formless, existential horror, that exists purely in the mind of the gamer. One person's perception of hell, limbo and the afterlife is a very personal thing. I'm not sure I want to state what I believe exists in the next world, or whether anything exists at all. The writing in Dark Fall leaves each gamer to come to their own conclusions in regards to concepts such as ghosts, evil, death and purgatory. I'm not a big fan of Christian and Catholic propaganda, so certainly wouldn't fuel any single ideologies.

== Reception ==
Reception

Aggregate score
Aggregator	Score
Metacritic	75/100

Review scores
Publication	Score
Adventure Gamers	4/5
GameZone	7.5
Adventure Classic Gaming	4/5
GameBoomers	A−
Hooked Gamers	7.5

Awards
Publication	Award
Adventure Gamers	Best First-Person PC Adventure (2009)
Adventure Gamers	Best Sound Effects (2009)

Lost Souls did not receive as much attention in the mainstream gaming press as either of the first two Dark Fall games, garnering limited coverage from professional critics. However, what reviews it did receive were mainly positive. It holds an aggregate score of 75 out of 100 on Metacritic, based on eight reviews.

GameZone scored the game 7.5 out of 10, praising the story and the detail of the game's milieu; "More impressive than the actual story is the way that it's told. Dark Fall's creator Jonathan Boakes was able to convey a lot of information using very simple storytelling techniques that fit perfectly within the gloomy world of the game." The game's sound design was also singled out for praise. Although they were critical of the obscurity of some of the puzzles, they concluded "it can be clunky, slow and frustrating, but offers up some better storytelling than many games with a hundred times the development budget. Sure, its clichéd at times. But it's also genuinely creepy and compelling."

Hooked Gamers' Caitlin Roberts also scored it 7.5 out of 10. Although she was critical of the plot, writing "depending on how you look at it, the plot is either far too linear and simple to be called a mystery puzzle, or there are far too many layers, shadings and ambiguous subplots intertwined in it for you to be able to make any sense of the direction the game is leading you in," she praised the voice acting, graphics, and, especially, the sound design. However, she was critical of the puzzles; "There was little that was logical, let alone intuitive, in the clue-hunting between the actual puzzles."

GameBoomers rated it an A−. They felt that although it was more of a straight "horror game" than either of the two previous Dark Fall games, it wasn't sufficiently scary. They also felt some of the puzzles were repetitive, although they praised the sound and plot. They concluded "Dark Fall: Lost Souls is an excellent adventure game, worthy of your time and your money."

Adventure Classic Gaming's Patrick Talbot scored it 4 out of 5, arguing the game to be "amongst the most atmospheric and terrifyingly creepy games I have ever played." He praised the graphics, sound design, interface and voice acting, concluding "Dark Fall: Lost Souls delivers an unforgettable horror adventure experience. Boakes is clearly passionate about his created world, and his passion shows readily in the game's design, script, sound, and music."

Adventure Gamers' Nathaniel Berens also scored it 4 out of 5, calling it "easily one of the scariest point-and-click adventures ever." He praised the game's dark atmosphere, and the graphical improvements over the first two games, especially the introduction of 360 degree panoramic navigation, higher resolution options and anti-aliasing capabilities. His main criticism concerned the plot, to which he referred as "all over the place." However, he concluded "in the end, I walked away from the game satisfied. There are few designers in the industry today that can match Jonathan Boakes' ability to conjure a location so fully and convincingly, populate it with texture and history, and then use it to scare the bejeezus out of you."

=== Awards ===
The game won "Best First-Person PC Adventure" and "Best Sound Effects" at the 2009 Adventure Gamers awards.
