= Oriental Empires =

2017 video game

- Developers: R.T. Smith & John Carline
- Publisher: Iceberg Interactive
- Engine: Unity
- Platform: Microsoft Windows
- Release: September 20, 2016 (Early access); September 14, 2017
- Genres: Turn-based strategy, 4X
- Mode: Single-player Multiplayer

Oriental Empires is a turn-based strategy game, set in Ancient China. It was developed by R.T. “Bob” Smith and John Carline and published by Iceberg Interactive in September 2017 for Windows PC.

== Overview ==
In Oriental Empires, players start out as a small Chinese tribe, a playable faction. The Chinese factions are the Shang, Zhou, Han, Shu, Qin, Chu, Wu, Min Yue, Ba. The Barbarian factions are the White Di, Dong Yi and the Dog Rong. The Nomad factions are the Xiongnu, Dingling, Xianbei and the Mongols. Finally, there are two rebel factions: peasant rebels and noble rebels. These are non-playable.

The goal of the game is to conquer China and be universally recognized as Emperor of China. The game's grand campaign spans a period of over 3000 years, from the Early Bronze Age to Imperial China.

== Gameplay ==
Oriental Empires features turn-based strategic gameplay. During a turn, players can move their units, battle, conduct diplomacy and develop their settlements. The game features a research tree with cultural, philosophical and religious branches. There's a single-player mode and a multiplayer mode, the multiplayer mode supports up to 15 players.

== Development ==
Oriental Empires is developed by R.T. “Bob” Smith, who previously worked on the Total War series. The game was announced in spring 2015 for PC. Oriental Empires was released in Steam’s Early Access program in September 2016. The game launched in Early Access without multiplayer, and the Early Access period was used to implement multiplayer. It left Early Access and was released in full on Steam in September 2017.

In January 2018 the game was released DRM-free on GOG.com.

== Reception ==
Oriental Empires currently holds a score of 74 on Metacritic based on sixteen critic reviews. Brendan Caldwell of Rock, Paper, Shotgun reviewed the game when it launched in Early Access in 2016 and noted the many technical issues. Luke Plunkett of Kotaku, in his review of the game in Early Access, called the game promising but also remarked that “the game’s presentation is a bit washed out and under-done, and the tutorial was pretty much broken”. Luke Winkie of PC Gamer called the full release game “A perfectly good 4X game with an innovative combat system that feels a bit bland when framed against the richness of its setting” and gave the game a score of 72. Chris Wray of wccftech scored the game with a 6.5 out of 10 and criticized it for lacking depth and variety. Charles Ellis of Wargamer praised the game for its “unusual setting and innovative mechanics”.

Oriental Empires was named as one of Steam’s “Early Access Grads”, the top games that left Early Access in 2017 as measured by gross revenue. It was awarded with the silver status.
