= Jonathan Boakes =

British video game designer

Jonathan Boakes (born 7 November 1973, in Kent, England) is an English game designer. He majors in writing adventure/psychological horror games such as the Dark Fall series and The Lost Crown. He is the CEO and founder of Darkling Room.

The games of Jonathan Boakes are usually designed based on real scenery, then the place is given a fictional name instead of using the real name in the game. One of his works, The Lost Crown, was based on the Polperro harbour, which was renamed as Saxton in the game.

== Games ==
| Year | Title | Platform(s) | Notes |
|---|---|---|---|
| 1998 | The Displacement | Microsoft Windows | Released in 2020 along with Dark Fall: Ghost Vigil |
| 19 June 2002 | Dark Fall | Microsoft Windows | |
| 24 August 2004 | Dark Fall II: Lights Out | Microsoft Windows | |
| 8 March 2006 | Scratches | Microsoft Windows | Voice cameo: Jerry |
| 18 July 2008 | The Lost Crown: A Ghost-Hunting Adventure | Microsoft Windows | |
| 21 April 2010 | Dark Fall: Lost Souls | Microsoft Windows | |
| 29 October 2015 | The Last Crown: Midnight Horror | Microsoft Windows | |
| 10 January 2020 | Dark Fall: Ghost Vigil | Microsoft Windows | |
| 9 September 2023 | Incubus - A ghost-hunters tale | Microsoft Windows | |
| TBA | Dark Fall: Storm Warning | Microsoft Windows | |
| TBA | Dark Fall: Dowerton Experiment | Microsoft Windows | |
| TBA | The Last Crown: Blackenrock | Microsoft Windows | |
| TBA | Silent Night | Microsoft Windows | |
| TBA | The Last Crown: The Haunting of Hallowed Isle | Microsoft Windows | |
| TBA | The First Crown | Microsoft Windows | |
| TBA | Lammana - The Looe Island Mystery | Microsoft Windows | |
| TBA | Glastonbury - Waking Dream of Avalon | Microsoft Windows | |
