= The Speed of Darkness =

The Speed of Darkness may refer to:

- The Speed of Darkness (play), a 1989 play by Steve Tesich
- The Speed of Darkness (EP), a 2003 EP from the band Leviathan
- Speed of Darkness, a 2011 album by Flogging Molly
- The Speed of Darkness (book), a 1968 book of poetry by Muriel Rukeyser
- The Speed of Darkness (novel), a 2016 novel by Catherine Fisher

== See also ==
- Speed of light (disambiguation)
