= Dark Fall II: Lights Out =

2004 video game

- North American cover art of the original edition
- Developer: XXv Productions
- Publishers: The Adventure Company (WW); Darkling Room ("Pins & Needles" Edition); Iceberg Interactive (Adventures in Terror)
- Designer: Jonathan Boakes
- Writer: Jonathan Boakes
- Composer: Jonathan Boakes
- Platform: Microsoft Windows
- Release: NA: August 26, 2004; EU: September 24, 2004; "Pins & Needles" Edition: WW: March 31, 2009; Director's Cut: WW: December 11, 2009; Adventures in Terror: WW: December 11, 2009
- Genres: First-person adventure, psychological horror
- Mode: Single-player

Dark Fall II: Lights Out is a 2004 first-person psychological horror/adventure game developed by British studio XXv Productions and published by The Adventure Company for Microsoft Windows. In 2009, Darkling Room released a director's cut of the game in a limited "Pins & Needles" edition. Later that same year, Iceberg Interactive released the Director's Cut in both a stand-alone edition and as part of Adventures in Terror: British Horror Collection. The original version of the game was made available on Steam in December 2013. Lights Out is an indirect sequel to the 2002 game Dark Fall, telling an unrelated story, although it does feature a recurring minor character. A third Dark Fall game, Dark Fall: Lost Souls, was released in 2009. A fourth entry titled Dark Fall: Ghost Vigil was released in 2020.

The game tells the story of Benjamin Parker, a cartographer sent to Trewarthan, Cornwall in 1912 to map the coastline. Whilst there, he becomes embroiled in the disappearance of three lighthouse keepers from the offshore Fetch Rock Lighthouse. Accused of murdering the three men, Parker must jump back and forth through time, facing a powerful entity known as Malaki, whose involvement with the disappearances Parker must attempt to unravel.

Lights Out received mixed reviews, with critics praising Jonathan Boakes' individual work on the game and his obvious passion for the adventure genre. Some also praised the atmosphere and storyline. Common criticisms focused on the game's technical limitations, specifically its graphical presentation, and predictable gameplay. Most critics also felt the game failed to improve on the original Dark Fall.

== Gameplay ==
Parker encounters Malakai in 2090 BC. The image shows the simple HUD, with items acquired by the player shown along the bottom of the screen.

Lights Out is a first-person psychological horror/adventure game, which employs a very simple HUD. A bar at the bottom of the screen serves as the inventory, storing items which the player has acquired during the game. A bar at the top of the screen displays options for the player to save their game, quit their game, or load a previously saved game.

The game uses a basic point-and-click interface to move the player around and manipulate the game world, which is presented entirely through static pre-rendered images. As the player moves the cursor around the screen it can change into different styles depending on the situation; neutral cursor (no interaction is possible), an arrow (the player can move in the direction indicated), a finger (indicating an item with which the player can directly interact), a wrench (the player must use an inventory item to initiate interaction), a magnifying glass (an area which can be examined in more detail), backwards arrow (the player can move backwards whilst facing the same direction; i.e. they do not have to turn around).

Much of the gameplay is based around solving puzzles. However, unlike most modern adventure games, Lights Out does not keep note of any information or clues acquired by the player (for example, notes found by the player are not entered into the inventory, and journal entries read by the player are not recorded in any way). This forces the player to keep track of every clue and detail themselves. If the player wishes to recheck a journal entry, they must find the journal and re-read it.

== Plot ==
The game begins on April 28, 1912, with the arrival in Trewarthan, Cornwall, of Benjamin Parker, a cartographer who has been commissioned by a local doctor, Robert Demarion, to map the shifting sands beneath the water along the coast. Upon arriving, Parker notices a lighthouse on a nearby island not marked on any map. On his first night in the village, he dreams of a metal container flying through space.

The next morning, in Demarion's house, he learns Demarion discovered a cave beneath the lighthouse, in which he heard "a pulse, like the devil's heartbeat", and saw light patterns appear on the walls. Later that night, Demarion tells Parker the island is called Fetch Rock, and the lighthouse has a reputation for being haunted. He also explains that several hours previously, a ship passed by the lighthouse and found it in darkness. Demarion is afraid something has happened to the three lighthouse keepers (Oliver Drake, Robert Shaw and James Woolfe), and asks Parker to go there to investigate.

In the lighthouse, Parker encounters the voice of Shaw, who tells him Drake has turned into a demon, and although he and Woolfe tried to hide, Drake was able to find them. Parker also discovers an unsent letter written by Woolfe to his fiancé, in which he tells her he thinks Drake is possessed, as he has seen him turn into a blinding light and whisper the name "Malakai". Shaw and Woolfe planned to leave the next day (April 29), but the letter ends with Woolfe seeing a light underneath their door. Parker also finds a letter from Demarion to Drake written several weeks previously. In the letter, Demarion tells Drake he has hired Parker and plans on sending him to the lighthouse.

In Drake's journal, Parker learns Drake had also been dreaming of the metal object flying through space; "The fire burns across the sky as the comet plunges into the sea. The water boils with rage and hate. He is furious. He is alone, confused and afraid. Like a lost child, he is scared of the loss of guidance, and fears for his young mind." Of Shaw and Woolfe, he writes "they must be taken, and broken, and washed away. Take them from this place, and down to sea, wash them away." Drake says that when Parker arrives on the island, it will be "time for the final Dark Fall", and claims his "master" owns the island but desperately wants to leave.

Parker finds the cave mentioned by Demarion, but when he enters, he sees a strange light and his surroundings change. He emerges on Fetch Rock in 2004. The lighthouse is now a visitor center, although it has recently closed because of several "incidents". Inside, Parker finds a book which explains that when the three keepers disappeared, Parker was blamed for their murder, as it was believed he killed them and then committed suicide. The chief witness in the case was Demarion, who claimed to have seen Parker heading to the lighthouse the night of the disappearance. Parker also finds correspondence from Polly White, a ghost hunter, who is convinced she is the reincarnation of Woolfe, and wants to come to the island to investigate. During regression hypnosis therapy, she claims there are four "presences" in the lighthouse, but the fourth presence "doesn't exist in our time." She claims Drake "lost his soul" after accidentally "releasing the darkness" in the basement. However, Parker encounters the spirit of Woolfe, who tells him he tricked Polly into coming because he thought she could help him and Shaw escape their entrapment. He now realises he was wrong to do so, and advises Parker to save himself and Polly.

Parker returns to 1912, and encounters Shaw's spirit, who tells him "Malakai is all around us." Parker is transported to 2090 B.C. where he encounters the voice of Malakai, who tells him many have tried to understand him, including "the Drake creature" and "the Magnus creature", but none have succeeded. In the cave on the island, Parker finds the metal object both himself and Drake dreamt about, the words "#4 D.E.O.S. Malakai" written on it, and a computer terminal accessible on its side.

Parker jumps to 2090 A.D. at which time Fetch Rock has become the home of D.E.O.S., a scientific research group involved in deep space exploration. The facility is deserted, but Parker learns a worker named Magnus found the ruins of the lighthouse at the bottom of an elevator shaft. He also discovers the metal object in the cave is a space probe which worked by manipulating dark matter so as to jump vast distances in milliseconds. Malakai was the fourth such probe, but unlike the others, was equipped with a highly sophisticated AI which allowed him to control himself. Parker discovers the Project Manager's notes, which detail that shortly after beginning his mission, Malakai encountered an "unknown event" which damaged his on-board systems. In a panic, he tried to jump back to D.E.O.S. headquarters, but instead disappeared from their scanners, materialising on Fetch Rock in 2090 B.C. instead.

Parker travels back to the time of Malakai's arrival, and using clues he has picked up over the course of the game, reprograms Malakai, allowing him to return to his own time. Malakai thanks Parker, telling him "I can now return, leave this place and never come back. My time is calling to me, soon I will be with my kind. All that will pass is set back on course and will never suffer corruption. My past deeds forgiven, my past crimes reversed." The game then cuts to 1912, on the same night the ship reported the lighthouse in darkness. As the fog rolls across the sky, the lighthouse reignites.

== Development ==
As with the original Dark Fall game, Jonathan Boakes worked primarily alone on Lights Out, writing, designing and programming the game, as well as voicing several characters, composing the music and designing the sound effects.

Whereas the original game was primarily inspired by a real life experience Boakes had, Lights Out featured a larger number of influences. The main inspirations for the game were the still-unexplained disappearance of three lighthouse keepers from the Flannan Isles Lighthouse in December 1900, and "The Ballad of Flannan Isle" (1912) by Wilfrid Wilson Gibson, which was inspired by the incident, and which features several times in the game itself. Another major influence on both the story and the look of the game was the 1977 Doctor Who serial Horror of Fang Rock, which itself was partly inspired by the Flannan Isles disappearances, and which sees the Fourth Doctor investigate why a lighthouse on the island of Fang Rock is not lit, finding one lighthouse keeper dead, and the others reporting a light fell from the sky near the island.

The time travel aspect of the game was partly inspired by the 1987 ghost story "Moondial" by Helen Cresswell, and the 1988 TV adaptation. Telling the story of Minty, a young girl staying with her aunt after her mother is injured in a car accident, the story features a moondial that enables Minty to time travel. Boakes also partially based the music in the game on the music in the TV show. As with the first game, Boakes also cites the Sapphire & Steel serial "The Railway Station" as a continuing influence, mainly in terms of the tone. Further influences include M. R. James 1925 ghost story "A Warning to the Curious" and its 1972 BBC adaptation for the series A Ghost Story for Christmas, in which an archaeologist accidentally finds one of the lost crowns of Anglia, which supposedly protect the country from invasion, and who is subsequently stalked by the crown's supernatural guardian.

The fictional village of Trewarthan was loosely based on the real Cornish village of Polperro. During the early stages of production, Boakes visited the village, and modeled many aspects of the game's village on real elements in Polperro; "textures can be created artificially, but the best results are achieved through using real surfaces. The rocks, woods and metals featured in Lights Out are, more often than not, real surfaces from the coastline where the game is set." Polperro also influenced the aural aspects of the game, with Boakes referring to the sound effects as "a huge cast of tonal rhythms, everyday sounds, and ghostly whispers." He captured many real sounds in Polperro, and enhanced them with Sound Forge. Of the sound design in general, he cites as an influence John Carpenter's 1980 film The Fog, which he felt used very little incidental music, instead relying on ambient sounds.

He employed a similar "reality based" design philosophy when creating the faces of the characters in the game. Firstly, he used Curious Labs' Poser 5 to mould the face to the shape he wanted, before applying skin texturing. However, rather than using "a flat 'skin' colour", he used photographs of actual skin as his texture, so as to achieve a more life like quality.

In terms of writing the complex time travel elements of the story, Boakes explains

I knew what the ending would be, and then proceeded to fill in the back-story. A timeline was drawn up, and fleshed out using elements from known history. This timeline includes the first inhabitants of the Cornish Islands through to the not too distant future, taking in The Spanish Armada, the construction of first brick lighthouses and the Second World War. Once the timeline looked solid, I plucked out eras which appealed to me as a writer.

He also explains the puzzles in the game were interwoven into the writing of the story in such a way that many of them became "invisible"; "some of the puzzles are integrated in such a way as to not appear as classic puzzles. I wished to create a more organic experience, which involved solving important key moments naturally, rather than being conscious of problem solving."

=== Director's Cut ===
In March 2009, Darkling Room published a special Limited "Pins & Needles" Edition, containing the original Dark Fall and a director's cut of Lights Out, walkthroughs for each game, a collection of ghost stories and a Dark Fall soundtrack CD. Limited to 300 copies, each is individually numbered, and signed by Boakes. In December 2009, Iceberg Interactive, who had purchased the rights to the series from The Adventure Company, released the Director's Cut in both a stand-alone edition, and as part of Adventures in Terror: British Horror Collection, which also contained Dark Fall: The Journal, and Shadow Tor Studios' Barrow Hill.

In regard to why he created a Director's Cut, Boakes explains

With Dark Fall: Lost Souls on the horizon, it seemed an appropriate time to re-evaluate the original games. After some thought, it was decided the time was right to update the games to run on newer systems, and also fix a few nagging issues which were present in the original versions. After tweaking a few things in Dark Fall, I found myself playing Lights Out and wondered why so much detail was removed during production. Then I remembered the publisher, and it all came flooding back. Not a good time. So, I grabbed the Spring Cleaning Bag, my old notes and scripts, and got to work re-vamping the game, and pushing it up onto a new level, that of a Director's Cut.

The Director's Cut included enhanced graphics, effects, and sound. Several puzzles have been altered, with some simplified and some made more challenging, whilst the story has been expanded by the addition of some new characters, dialogue, ghosts, documents, and a new location. Unique to the Director's Cut is that players can now speak directly to some of the ghosts by means of a conversation tree.

== Reception ==
Reception

Aggregate score
Aggregator	Score
Metacritic	66/100

Review scores
Publication	Score
1Up.com	D−
Adventure Gamers	3.5/5
Computer Gaming World	4/5
GameSpot	6.3/10
GameSpy	2/5
PC Gamer (US)	58%
Computer Games Magazine	3/5

Lights Out received "mixed or average reviews". It holds an aggregate score of 66 out of 100 on Metacritic, based on twenty reviews.

Adventure Gamers' Dan Ravipinto scored the game 3.5 out of 5. He praised Boakes for trying new things, but felt some of them didn't work; "ultimately the game does not play out as well as the original with regards to both the story and the gameplay, but in the end, it's an admirable attempt." He was critical of both the time travel aspect of the story, and the science fiction elements introduced towards the end, although he praised the game's improved graphics. He concluded "ultimately, the new directions the game goes in dilute the qualities that made the first Dark Fall so great, and it ends up being much less immediate, real and frightening than its predecessor. Still, this slightly lesser Dark Fall still contains a deeply realized world that's definitely worth the effort of exploring."

GameSpot's Scott Osborne scored the game 6.3 out of 10, criticizing it for being too similar to the original; "If you played last year's Dark Fall: The Journal, then you've virtually played its follow-up. Both games share almost identical weaknesses and strengths." He was critical of the "static slideshow presentation" and the "dull and cryptic storytelling", but praised "Boakes' obvious love for British landscapes and lore and his penchant for meticulously detailed game environments". He concluded "Dark Fall: Lights Out is ultimately unambitious and relies on very dated and dry presentation methods. Overall, it feels strikingly like its predecessor, though with a bit more visual polish and a tad more diversity. All told, Lights Out is a decent but unremarkable little adventure."

GameSpy's Tom Chick scored it 2 out of 5. Although he praised Boakes' attention to detail, and obvious passion for the genre, he was critical of the gameplay; "you'll rarely have a sense for how important a clue is or whether something is even a clue. Lights Out relies on copious note taking because there's no in-game mechanism for keeping track of what you've found [...] This means there's lots of backtracking and wandering as you do things like travel 4000 years into the past to unlock a door in 1912. "Counter-intuitive" doesn't even begin to describe the nature of the puzzles here. This is the sort of gameplay aimed almost solely at obsessive, hardcore adventure gamers."

1UP.com's Garnett Lee rated the game a D−, calling the Dark Fall games "woefully out of date point and click mysteries [...] Their stories play out more like an illustrated book. Screen after screen of lifeless scenes must be clicked on to find the little spot here or there that advances the plot." Of the graphics, he wrote "many users will have screensavers that look better than Lights Out." He concluded "Lights Out more resembles a student project for a gaming college than a finished retail product [...] Even fans of style will want to spend their time elsewhere. As the new Myst sequel shows, even the point and click adventure has grown some over the past decade. Lights Out has not."

The editors of Computer Gaming World nominated Dark Fall II as their 2004 "Adventure Game of the Year", although it lost to In Memoriam.
