= Stardrive =

Stardrive may refer to:

- StarDrive, a 4X space strategy game released in 2013 for Microsoft Windows
- "Star drive", a screw drive characterized by a six-point star-shaped pattern. The best known brand is Torx
- "Stardrive", a 1981 episode of Blake's 7
- Star*Drive, a setting for the role-playing game Alternity, published in 1998 by TSR, Inc.
- Faster-than-light propulsion
