= Gas Guzzlers Extreme =

2013 video game

- Game Logo
- Developer: Gamepires
- Publisher: Iceberg Interactive
- Platforms: Microsoft Windows; Xbox One; PlayStation 4; Nintendo Switch
- Release: Microsoft Windows; October 8, 2013; Xbox One; November 4, 2016; PlayStation 4; November 26, 2019; Nintendo Switch; October 28, 2021
- Genre: Combat racing
- Modes: Single-player, multiplayer

Gas Guzzlers Extreme is a combat racing game, released on October 8, 2013 for Microsoft Windows. The game uses the PranaEngine, developed by Gamepires. The purpose of the game is to dominate the tracks by racing and/or shooting opponents. The game offers a total of 7 race types such as Classic Race, Power Race, Battle Race, Knockout, Capture The Flag, (Team) Deathmatch, and Last Man Standing. Gas Guzzlers Extreme includes 18 different vehicles and 12 weapons that can be used in 40 tracks and 8 different arenas.

== Gameplay ==
Reception

Aggregate scores
Aggregator	Score
GameRankings	70.53%
Metacritic	73/100

- Players start out with low performance vehicles and soon work their way up to high-performance models, by earning money in a series of hi-octane races and arena battles. New game modes, tracks and vehicles are unlocked as players progress through the game. Along with developing their driving and fighting skills, players can spend their hard-fought cash, customizing their vehicle to match their clan members or pimping their ride for the road to glory.
- Combat racing at its best, featuring a blood pumping single player campaign with over 12 hours of gameplay
- Multi-path tracks and sponsored events.
- Instant play with vicious AI Bots populating your multiplayer match while other players begin to join in on the fun
- Beautifully displayed high definition visuals with extensive vehicle damage, motion blur effects and custom paint jobs
- Packed with tons of unique humor and personality
- Full integration with Steam – Single-player, multi-player, achievements, leaderboards, Steam Cloud, stats, Valve Anti-Cheat, full controller support (with the Xbox 360 controller) and Steam Trading Cards
- Gas Guzzlers Extreme: Full Metal Frenzy DLC
- Domination Derby: A Destruction Derby with flags. Keep your flag and try to score points, the player with most points wins.
