= Hommage to Lovey-Dovey =

Single by Speed

from the album Hommage to Lovey-Dovey
- Released: February 14, 2012
- Genre: K-pop, dance-pop
- Length: 8:09
- Label: GM Contents Media, LOEN Entertainment Inc.

Speed singles chronology
"Hommage to Lovey-Dovey" (2012)	"Speed of Light" (2013)

"Hommage to Lovey Dovey" is the debut single by South Korea boy group Speed. Speed is part of the Core Contents Media and was formed as a sub-unit of Co-Ed School and the all-male counterpart the all female sub-unit known as 5dolls. The promotional single for the album was called "Lovey Dovey-Plus".

== Release ==
In January 2012, the sub-units name, Speed was revealed along with the announcement that they would release the digital single "Lovey Dovey-Plus", a "hommage" track to T-ara's hit "Lovey-Dovey". T-ara ex-member Ryu Hwayoung and her twin sister Ryu Hyoyoung (from 5dolls) were featured in the music video. Speed followed the release of the single with two weeks of promotions on music shows.

== Music and video ==
=== Music ===
Speed's agency, GM Contents Media requested to rearrange T-ara's "Lovey-Dovey" in their own style and participated in the arrangement with the permission of T-ara's agency, Core Contents Media resulting in the song "Lovey-Dovey Plus".

=== Background video ===
The music video for "Lovey-Dovey Plus" reminds us of Michael Jackson's "Billie Jean". T-ara former member Ryu Hwayoung and her twin sister Ryu Hyoyoung (from 5dolls) were featured in the music video.

== Track list ==
Hommage to Lovey Dovey
No.	Title	Length
1.	"Lovey-Dovey Plus"	3:57
2.	"Lovey-Dovey Plus" (Music Video ver.)	4:12
Total length:		8:09

== Release history ==
Region	Format	Date	Label	Edition
Worldwide	Digital download	February 14, 2012	GM Contents Media; LOEN Entertainment Inc.	Single album
