= Still There =

- Developer: GhostShark Games
- Publisher: Iceberg Interactive
- Engine: Unity3D
- Platforms: Windows, macOS, Nintendo Switch
- Release: 20 November 2019
- Genre: Point-and-click adventure
- Mode: Single-player

Still There is a 2019 point-and-click adventure video game developed by GhostShark Games and published by Iceberg Interactive.

== Gameplay and story ==
Still There is a sci-fi psychological point-and-click adventure video game. The game tells the story of Karl, the keeper of the Bento space-lighthouse. His job requires him to live in almost total isolation, performing routine maintenance and screening radio broadcasts, until the monotony is broken by a mysterious help request.

The gameplay is based on challenging technical puzzles that must be solved using the spaceship manual and the help of an in-board AI. The story tackles difficult themes as grief and loss.

== Development and release ==
Still There was developed by four people: Davide Barbieri (GhostShark Games), Daniele Giardini (Demigiant), Gaetano Leonardi (La Boite) and Ben Burnes (Abstraction Music). The engine used to develop the game was Unity 3D.

Still There was announced on 8 August 2019. and showcased at Gamescom on 22 August 2019. The game was published by Iceberg Interactive and released for Windows, macOS and Nintendo Switch on 20 November 2019.

== Reception ==
Reception

Aggregate score
Aggregator	Score
Metacritic	77/100

Still There received "generally favorable" reviews from critics according to review aggregator Metacritic and it is considered "strong" from critics according to review aggregator OpenCritic.
