= DX Studio =

Integrated development tool for 3D video games creation

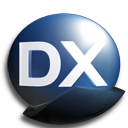
- Developer(s): Worldweaver Ltd
- Final release: v3.2 / December 1st, 2010
- Operating system: Microsoft Windows
- Type: Game Engine
- License: Proprietary
- Website: dxstudio.com

DX Studio is a complete integrated development tool for the creation of 3D video games, simulations or real-time interactive applications for either standalone, web based, Microsoft Office or Visual Studio use.

== Development ==
DX Studio is produced by Worldweaver Ltd, a company that was established in 1996 by Chris Sterling to develop PC games and high-end business GIS applications. Development of DX Studio began in 2002 and the first version was released to market in 2005. Since then the user base of DX Studio has grown to around 30,000 worldwide.

=== Release history ===
- November 2005 - DX Studio 1.0 Released
- May 2007 - DX Studio 2.0 Released
- September 2008 - DX Studio 3.0 Released
- June 2009 - DX Studio 3.1 Released
- December 2010 - DX Studio 3.2 Released

== Features ==
The system includes both 2D and 3D layout editors, and allows JavaScript control of scenes, objects and media in real-time. Documents can also be controlled from outside of the player using the ActiveX/COM interface or a TCP/IP port. The engine behind DX Studio uses DirectX 9.0c, and includes support for the latest pixel and vertex shader effects found on the more powerful 3D graphics cards.

The DX Studio 2D and 3D editors can be used to build interactive layers and sequences, which are combined to produce a complete interactive document. The top level editor can be used just to drag and drop scenes together at a high level, or can 'drill down' to edit 3D and 2D scenes. Inside each scene, users can drill down further to edit the individual textures, backgrounds and sounds.

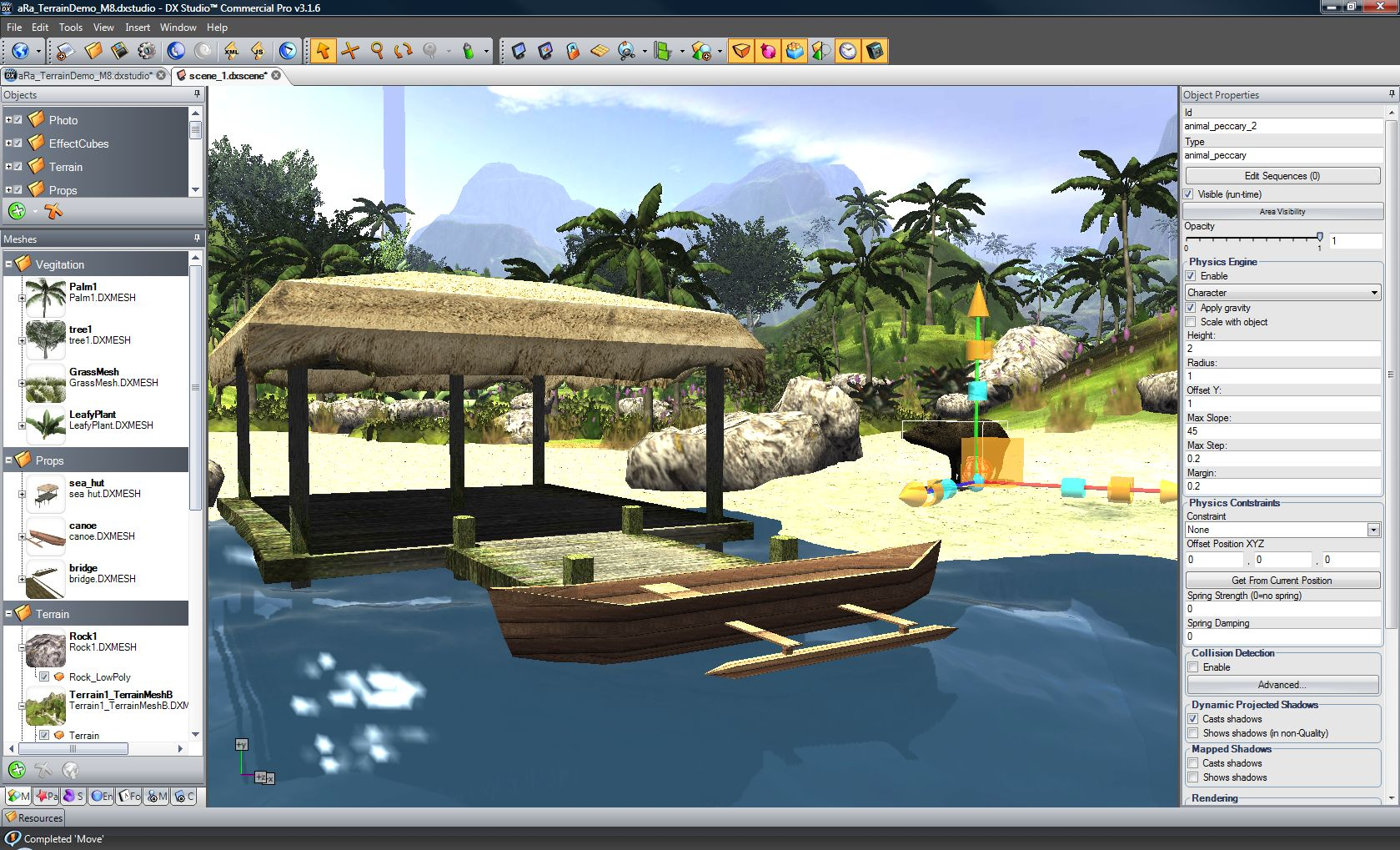

Using ActiveX technology users can build their own C++, C# or VB.Net applications and drop the DX Studio Player in as a component. A complete interactive document can be compiled into a single redistributable EXE. This can then be pressed to CD, emailed, placed on a website or in another archive. The EXE also performs system checks and will download and install any DirectX upgrades that may be necessary.

The files produced by DX Studio use standard XML to describe the entire scenes. The files also contain all the resources needed to display the 3D world, compressed into the same file using standard ZIP compatible algorithms. A security option allows this data to be encrypted if necessary.

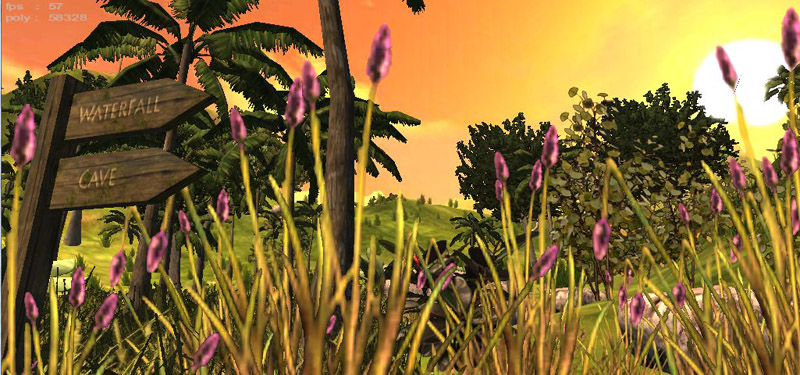

Built-in special effects include full lens flares, water ripples, particle systems, real-time shadows, 3D video projection (in MPEG or AVI format), 3D positioned sound, and post-production effects (such as 'sepia', 'bloom' and 'corona').

For advanced users a plug-in SDK is available which, with some DirectX/C++ or HLSL knowledge, users can code their effects.

== Licensing ==
DX Studio is available in both standard and professional editions. A distinction in licensing between commercial and non-commercial users is also made. Full source code to the player is also available under a Corporate License. dx studio seitan 3dx

== Critical reception ==
The DX Studio series overall has been critically well received, particularly for its development environment. Version 2.1 was recommended by PC Advisor for users wanting good results on a budget, highlighting the workspace and available technical support. Version 3.0 was rated 4 out of 5 by Digital Arts, who praised the high-quality effects, interactive real-time 3D previews, video streaming, online library, and the budget price suitable for students. Criticisms included web content deployment, which requires a plug-in; lack of Macintosh support; reliance on imported 3D models; some interface issues and operational quirks. Computer Active! also awarded 4 out of 5, pointing out the inexpensive price, ease of use and good support, but criticising some performance problems with legacy files.
