= Stormling Studios =

Turkish video-game developer company

- Industry: Video games
- Founded: 2005
- Headquarters: Istanbul, Turkey
- Key people: Onur Şamlı, Oral Şamlı, Galip Kartoğlu
- Products: CPAGE, Darkness Within 1, Darkness Within 2
- Website: https://stormlingstudios.com/

Stormling Studios is an independent game developer located in Istanbul, Turkey. One of the notable products they have developed is Darkness Within 2: The Dark Lineage and their proprietary panoramic game engine, CPAGE. The studio changed its name from Zoetrope Interactive to Stormling Studios before the release of their 2020 game, Transient.

== Games ==
- Darkness Within: In Pursuit of Loath Nolder (2007)
- Darkness Within 2: The Dark Lineage (2009)
- Conarium (2017)
- Transient (2020)
- Lunacy: Saint Rhodes (2023)
- Veil of Madness (2026)

== Team ==
- Galip Kartoğlu - Software
- Onur Şamlı - Graphics
- Oral Şamlı - Graphics
