= StarDrive =

2013 video game

- Developer: Zero Sum Games
- Publisher: Iceberg Interactive
- Designer: Daniel DiCicco
- Platform: Microsoft Windows
- Release: April 26, 2013
- Genres: 4X, real-time strategy
- Mode: Single-player

StarDrive is a 4X real-time strategy video game by Zero Sum Games, it was released for Microsoft Windows in April 2013. The game was funded through Kickstarter, raising $17,676 in its December 2011 crowdfunding campaign. The player's goal is to dominate the galaxy with one of the eight races through diplomacy and war while developing new technologies, exploring new star systems and colonizing new planets. The game received a mixed critical reception, generating a score of 61/100 on reviews aggregation website Metacritic. Its sequel, StarDrive 2 contrastingly adopts turn-based strategy gameplay and was released in April 2015.
