= Lords of the Black Sun =

2014 video game

- Developer: Arkavi Studios
- Publisher: Iceberg Interactive
- Platform: Microsoft Windows
- Release: September 12, 2014
- Genres: Science fiction, turn-based strategy, 4X
- Modes: Single-player, multiplayer

Lords of the Black Sun (previously titled Star Lords) is a 4X turn-based strategy computer game created by Portuguese developer Arkavi Studios and published by Iceberg Interactive. It was made available as an early access game on Steam December 6, 2013 and was released on September 12, 2014.

== Gameplay ==
Lords of the Black Sun plays like a traditional 4X and features 8 races, tactical turn-based combat, in-depth Espionage/Intel and Diplomacy components, a complex AI that, according to the developers, doesn't cheat and a "living universe" featuring independent races and pirate clans. Gameplay includes LAN, hotseat and online multiplayer complete with matchmaking.

== Reception ==
Lords of the Black Sun

Aggregate scores
Aggregator	Score
GameRankings	40.00%
Metacritic	58/100

Despite being named as one of the best games of 2014 by PC Gamer and being in the list of the most awaited releases of that year in several media outlets, Lords of the Black Sun was met with mixed reception upon release. Some praised the game for its solid and easy to pick up gameplay and welcome additions to the tried and true 4X formula, while others complained of constant crashes, bland visuals and incompetent AI.
