= Speed of Light (Speed song) =

Single by Speed

from the album Superior Speed
- A-side: "슬플약속"
- B-side: "슬플약속"
- Released: January 7, 2013
- Genre: K-pop, dance-pop
- Length: 8:04
- Label: Core Contents Media
- Producer: Double Kick

Speed singles chronology
"Hommage to Lovey-Dovey" (2012)	"Speed of Light" (2013)

"Speed of Light" is the second single by South Korea boy group Speed. The single album by promotional singles "슬플약속 (That's My Fault)".

== Release ==
In December 9, 2012, Core Contents Media released the first teaser photo for "It's Over" for their debut album Superior Speed. Before the release of the debut album, Speed's they released single album "Speed of Light" the title is 슬플약속 (That's My Fault) feat. Davichi's Kang Minkyung.

== Background ==
Two music videos were released for the song "슬플약속 (That's My Fault)" featuring Davichi's Kang Minkyung; a dance version and a drama version featuring Park Bo-young, A Pink's Naeun, Ji Chang-wook, and Ha Seok-jin. The part. 2 of drama version for their debut album Superior Speed by title track is "It's Over".

== Music and video ==
=== Music ===
"슬플약속 (That's My Fault)" is a minor medium tempo song themed Mandorin and each member's rap works along well with it. It describes a man who is heartbroken after a breakup.

=== Background video ===
The drama version of the music video will be divided up into two segments featuring the songs "That's My Fault" as well as "It's Over", and will feature a heartaching love story and friendship set in the ’80s. Actress Park Bo Young will be starring in the music video, but it turns out joining her will be others like A Pink's Na Eun, Ji Chang Wook and Ha Seok-jin, who will all be starring in this new project that is said to have cost 750 million KRW or around $700,000 USD. The filming started this morning on the 15th, and will continue on for two more days under the direction of director Cha Eun Taek, with a special appearance by Kim Young Ho.

=== Synopsis ===
The drama video is Gwangju government or Gwangju Democratization Movement on May 18, 1980. Residents in Gwangju get their due, but many soldiers are killing citizens and taken hostage. Many people are frustrated and even stress due to the incident.

A young man, Chang-wook who fell in love with Bo-young when they met at the time of the incident, but he was feuding with her brother, Seok-jin. At that time, Na-eun, a woman who loved to Seok-jin, was arrested by soldiers dam made the decision to team up against the army, but Seok-jin was shot dead by soldiers. A few days later, Chang-wook wants Gwangju citizens free. Together with the citizens of Gwangju, he marched in front of a soldier holding a lot of people. Finally, many people who were shot dead, including Chang-wook. This drama video tells of grief to those involved in the incident.

== Track listing ==
Speed of Light
No.	Title	Lyrics	Music	Arrangement	Length
1.	"슬픈약속" (Seupeunyaksok, That's My Fault (feat. Kang Min-kyung of Davichi))	Double Kick, Glory of The face	Double Kick, David Kim	Glory of The face	4:02
2.	"슬픈약속" (Seupeunyaksok, That's My Fault (Inst.))		Double Kick, David Kim	Glory of The face	4:02
Total length:					8:04

== Release history ==
Region	Format	Date	Label	Edition
Worldwide	Digital download	January 7, 2013	Core Contents Media	Single album
