= Cornish Islands =

Island pair in Graham Land, Antarctica

- Location within Antarctica

Geography
- Location: Antarctica
- Coordinates: 66°59′S 67°28′W

Administration
- Administered under the Antarctic Treaty System

Demographics
- Population: Uninhabited

The Cornish Islands are two small, snowcapped islands with a rock between them, lying 7.4 kilometres (4 nmi) south of Liard Island in Hanusse Bay, Graham Land. They were mapped from air photos obtained by the Ronne Antarctic Research Expedition (1947–48) and the Falkland Islands and Dependencies Aerial Survey Expedition (1956–57). They were named by the UK Antarctic Place-Names Committee for Vaughan Cornish (1863–1948), an English geographer who made pioneer investigations of snow drift forms in the years 1901–14.

== See also ==
- List of Antarctic and sub-Antarctic islands
