= Darkness Within: In Pursuit of Loath Nolder =

2007 video game

- Developer: Zoetrope Interactive
- Publishers: Lighthouse Interactive (Former); Iceberg Interactive (as of June 2009)
- Designers: Onur Şamlı; Oral Şamlı; Galip Kartoğlu
- Engine: CPAGE
- Platforms: Microsoft Windows; Cloud (OnLive)
- Release: NA: 6 November 2007; UK: 9 November 2007; EU: 16 November 2007
- Genre: Adventure
- Mode: Single-player

Darkness Within: In Pursuit of Loath Nolder is a first-person 3D adventure / horror thriller video game. Players attempt to solve a murder in an imaginary "Lovecraftian" place called Wellsmoth. It is the first in an expected series of three games. The second game is Darkness Within 2: The Dark Lineage.

The story of the game was written with the impressions of the writer H. P. Lovecraft’s works. The game was temporarily without a publisher when Lighthouse Interactive went out of business. On June 2, 2009 it was announced that Iceberg Interactive acquired the publishing rights to this game.

Darkness Within was republished on November 14 on Steam with enhanced graphics and some more additions. On November 3, 2015, original soundtracks of both Darkness Within 1 & 2 were officially released on Steam by Zoetrope.

== Plot ==
As police detective Howard E. Loreid, players are tasked to solve the murder of Clark Field, a wealthy man involved in the occult. At the top of their list of suspects is Loath Nolder, a highly respected private investigator who mysteriously abandoned his last case for reasons unknown. It is suggested that he ventured to several exotic places around the world; it is still unknown why Loath Nolder disappeared so suddenly, resurfacing five years later and resuming his investigations just as abruptly as he had left them.

This seemingly routine investigation takes a twist as strange happenings begin to plague the player's psyche. They experience lucid dreams and are tormented by paranormal happenings. Days seem to pass instead of hours when the player sleeps. They also must make sense of what's real and what's not. As they pursue fugitive murder suspect Loath Nolder, they face dire truths hidden deep within a haunting darkness and the recesses of their mind.

== Reception ==
Reception

Aggregate scores
Aggregator	Score
GameRankings	55.50%
Metacritic	52/100

Review scores
Publication	Score
GameSpot	3.5/10
GameZone	6.3/10
IGN	5.1/10

Darkness Within: In Pursuit of Loath Nolder received mixed reviews upon its original release. On Metacritic, the game holds a score of 52/100 based on 15 reviews, indicating "mixed or average reviews". On GameRankings, the game holds a score of 55.50% based on 14 reviews.

IGN's Charles Onyett gave the game a 5.1/10, strongly criticizing the game's graphics for being "intensely low-budget" but praising the sound design and voice acting. Brett Todd of GameSpot was even more critical of the game, giving it a 3.5/10 while pointing out the game's lack of scares and its "bland locations and graphics".
