= Darkness Within 2: The Dark Lineage =

2010 video game

- Developer: Zoetrope Interactive
- Publisher: Iceberg Interactive
- Series: Darkness Within
- Platform: Windows
- Release: May 28, 2010 (Note: Retail version released in the UK on May 31.)
- Genre: Adventure
- Mode: Single-player

Darkness Within 2: The Dark Lineage is a 2010 first-person adventure horror thriller video game developed by Zoetrope Interactive and published by Iceberg Interactive for Windows. A sequel to Darkness Within: In Pursuit of Loath Nolder, the game is part of a series of adventure games inspired by famous horror writer H.P. Lovecraft.

Players again take the role of police detective Howard Loreid, who suffered from the paranormal happenings around him in the first game. Now, Howard discovers that his own horrible past is connected with the madness that is about to swallow him. Unlike its predecessor, which utilized a traditional Myst style of movement, this game uses a first-person perspective similar to that of most first-person shooters.

Darkness Within 2: The Dark Lineage Director’s Cut Edition was republished on December 5 on Steam with enhanced graphics and some more additions. The official soundtrack featuring 29 tracks (69 minutes) was also released as a DLC on November 3, 2015.
