= Starpoint Gemini 2 =

2010 space trading and combat video game

- Developer: Little Green Men Games
- Publisher: Iceberg Interactive (Note: Self-published by Little Green Men Games for Xbox One.)
- Platforms: Windows; Xbox One
- Release: Windows; 26 September 2014; Xbox One; 11 December 2015
- Genres: Space trading and combat simulator, role-playing
- Mode: Single-player

Starpoint Gemini 2 (abbreviated to SPG2 or SG2) is a space trading and combat simulator developed by the Croatian-based Little Green Men Games (LGM Games) development studio. It is a direct sequel to Starpoint Gemini, which was released in 2010.

== Features ==
Starpoint Gemini 2 is a full 3D space sim/RPG. The in-game world is the Gemini system, which consists of various cohesive star systems. Players captain one of around seventy ships, controlling a single vessel rather than a fleet, although wingmen as well as ship’s officers will be available for hiring. The game features pre-scripted story missions, but also randomly generated “Freelance missions” that rely on player’s actions and allegiances.

At the beginning of 2014, LGM Games became an official Oculus Rift developer and have begun implementing support for the VR device. Their stated plan is to "make all the necessary modifications in rendering and resolution in order to allow players to experience all Oculus Rift is capable of offering".

== Gameplay ==
The player can choose to play campaign or freeroam mode. The game features an extensive space simulation gameplay where the player is put in control of capital ships instead of more classic approach of controlling fighter based vehicles.

The player has a high degree of freedom in the game. Available professions include space pirate, trader, privateer, asteroid miner, gas miner, scientist, explorer, salvager and lawkeeper. The player is open to explore these professions freely, but there is a set class that is picked upon character creation. The three classes are Commander, Gunner and Engineer. Commander is specialized in fleet augmentation and Gunner in offensive capabilities. Engineer is mix in between while also featuring support skills.

== Combat mechanics ==
Players can utilize control of their weapon batteries and turret based weapon system. Depending on their ship's preset conditions, they can equip a fixed number of weapon types to their ship, which also have preset locations on the ship and turret firing angles. Furthermore the player can increase or decrease the number of turrets placed on the ship. Weapon system feature light weapons (beams/railguns/plasma) and heavy weapons (missiles/shockwave).

The shield system also follows more unconventional approach by splitting them in four parts instead of a usual single system. Players can use four skills which differ depending on the class selected and can use equipment to augment combat abilities. All this allows for a more tactical and faster paced gameplay.

== Campaign ==
In the campaign mode, the player starts out as Adrian Faulkner, a 22-year-old son of the legendary Gemini League hero, Gabriel Faulkner, known best for his endeavors in the last Gemini war. The player struggles to unveil the mysteries of his father's death and his efforts to save the Gemini from foreign invasions. Along with the main story quest line, the player is also able to pause his main story progression in order to enjoy features that the freeroam mode provides from the start.

== Freeroam ==
The player is thrown into a vast universe with a starting ship to explore and play freely. There are no obligations to complete any quests, and it is essentially a sandbox experience where players can choose to play as they like.

== Timeline ==
- December 2011: First announcement
- January 2013: Little Green Men Games secures publishing of Starpoint Gemini 2 with Iceberg Interactive
- September 2013: Alpha released on Steam Early Access.
- March 2014: Beta released on Steam.
- September 2014: Final Release Candidate released on Steam.
- February 2015: DLC "Secrets of Aethera" released on Steam.
- June 2015: DLC "Origins" Free port of Starpoint Gemini story into the new engine, released on Steam.
- June 2015: "Starpoint Gemini: Warlords" spinoff from Starpoint Gemini 2 announced on official LGM website
- September 2015: DLC "Titans" announced on official LGM website

== Reception ==
Reception

Aggregate scores
Aggregator	Score
GameRankings	(PC) 74.08% (XONE) 70.00%
Metacritic	(PC) 70/100 (XONE) 71/100

Review scores
Publication	Score
IGN	8/10
PC Gamer (US)	80/100
Strategy Informer	75/100
COnline Gamers	82/100

Starpoint Gemini 2 has been generally favorable by critics. Aggregating review websites GameRankings and Metacritic gave the game 74.09% and 70/100.

Patrick Carlson from PC Gamer described the game as one of the most positive and relaxing game experiences he has had in a long time.

Nicholas Plouffe from Canadian Online Gamers thanked the developers for making him lose himself in his own little world.

Nick Horth from Strategy Informer praises the game for its pirate system: "Want to be a despicable pirate, preying on weak transport ships and poorly defended mining stations? That's fine, knock yourself out."

Di Lorenzo Baldo from IGN Italia describes the game as "the best balm to heal the wounds left open after the disastrous X Rebirth"

=== Sales ===
According to LGM, the game sold more than 400,000 copies as of February 2019.

== Awards ==
- 2014 - Best PC games of 2014 - Exploration and survival
- 2014 - Best game in the region
- 2014 - Top 100 indie of the year
