= Star Trek: Birth of the Federation =

1999 video game

- Developer: MicroProse Alameda
- Publisher: Hasbro Interactive (Note: Released under the MicroProse label)
- Producers: Jeff Holzhauer; Wella Lasola
- Designers: Kyle Brink; Bill Chinn
- Programmer: Bill Chinn
- Artist: Rima Litonjua
- Writers: Kyle Brink; Daniel Young
- Composer: Steven Scherer
- Series: Star Trek: The Next Generation
- Engine: Falcon 4.0
- Platform: Microsoft Windows
- Release: NA: May 25, 1999; EU: May 28, 1999
- Genres: 4X, turn-based strategy
- Modes: Single player, multiplayer

Star Trek: Birth of the Federation (also known as Star Trek: The Next Generation: Birth of the Federation and Birth of the Federation) is a 4X turn-based strategy video game developed by MicroProse Alameda and published by Hasbro Interactive under the MicroProse label. The game was initially released in 1999 for Windows personal computers.

The game is set in the Star Trek fictional universe, specifically related to Star Trek: The Next Generation. The player takes control of one of five civilisations, either the Federation, Ferengi, Klingons, Romulans or Cardassians. Thirty other races from the Star Trek universe are included as minor races in the game. In addition to the strategy mode of the game, Birth of the Federation also features a 3D combat mode which uses the Falcon 4.0 engine.

The game's release was intended to tie-in with the film Star Trek: Insurrection. Birth of the Federation received average to good ratings from critics, who praised the look of the game but were critical of the AI of enemy factions, the research technologies and the time it took to play. It was compared to other games such as Master of Orion II and Sid Meier's Alpha Centauri.

== Gameplay ==
The game is a 4X turn-based computer strategy game set in The Next Generation era of Star Trek, with only starships and races from that series and movies. There are no ships or races from The Original Series or Star Trek: Voyager unless they appeared on The Next Generation. For example, the Romulan Warbird from The Next Generation appears, but the Romulan Bird of Prey from The Original Series does not. There are two designs from Deep Space Nine that are in the game: the Heavy Escort Defiant Class and the Cardassian Starbase design used for Deep Space Nine, both of which appeared in a TNG episode or movie as well. The game is played on a 2d Galaxy Map which represents star systems, task forces, empire borders and other space phenomena via the use of icons. Map size varies: small (10x13), medium (12x16), and huge (18x26). There are also separate screens for empire research, colony management, intelligence and diplomacy which are all accessed from a right-click main menu.

The player starts with a star system under their control and the purpose of the game is to create the most powerful empire in the galaxy. This is achieved through diplomacy, colonization of new worlds and defeating rivals. Winning the game in an alliance with a rival empire is also possible. Unlike similar games such as Master of Orion, diplomacy isn't the core means of winning the game for all factions. Instead the victory conditions also allow for the player to win if they control 60% of the population of the galaxy and the inhabited systems, but an alliance with another empire increases the percentage required to 75%. The "Vendetta" victory conditions requires an Empire to defeat two rivals; for the Federation it is the Romulans and the Cardassians.

Space Battles are turn-based, and allow for the player to issue orders to individual vessels. The player then watches the two sides follow their respective orders at the same time. These sequences can be recorded and replayed later in multiple camera angles. Space combats can also be skipped, allowing the computer to work out the results. Unlike games like Master of Orion II, there is no ability to customise the look of individual vessels or classes. Each of these use predefined designs. Multiplayer for up to five players can be played over a LAN, and was available on the internet via Hasbro Interactive's Games.com.

The player is also required to manage resources for their empire. At an individual system level, the player must manage energy to power structures, food to feed the population and industry units which determines how quickly ships and structures can be constructed. Across an empire, the player must also manage credits which allow for structures and ships to be instantly constructed, to support ships beyond the maximum allowed by the population and to be used as gifts or bribes. In addition to population, the number of starships that an empire can build simultaneously is restricted by the number of dilithium refineries it owns.

=== Factions ===
Although the title of the game is Birth of the Federation, the player can choose from five major powers: The Federation, the Klingon Empire, the Romulan Star Empire, the Cardassian Union, and the Ferengi Alliance. Each of these factions have different advantages, so while the Federation is more proficient at diplomacy, the Klingons are better in military matters, and the Romulans at espionage. The Ferengi are the best at trading and have the unique ability to set up trade routes with minor factions without the need for treaties, and the Cardassians benefit from an increased production speed. In addition, the minor races can be befriended by the player and can eventually become part of their empire (either by joining peacefully or by conquest). There are 30 minor races in the game. Each minor race adds a unique ability to the empire that controls them, for example the Bolians allow the player to construct a building which increases the effectiveness of spies in the game, and the Betazoids (with their telepathy) boost the effectiveness of counterintelligence.

== Production ==
MicroProse had developed similar games such as Civilization (1991) and had been involved in the publishing of the Simtex games Master of Orion (1993), Master of Magic (1994) and Master of Orion II: Battle at Antares (1996). Simtex itself closed in 1997, but Birth of the Federation had been described by critics as an unofficial sequel to the Orion games, and was in the mold of Civilization and Master of Magic. Microprose had the rights to create games based on Star Trek: The Next Generation, but did not hold the rights to Star Trek: The Original Series which were held by Interplay Entertainment.

The 3D battle sequences used the Falcon 4.0 engine, with each vessel rendered fully. In addition to being called Star Trek: The Next Generation: Birth of the Federation, it was also referred to as Star Trek: Birth of the Federation. Microprose previewed the game alongside Star Trek: Klingon Honour Guard at the Electronic Entertainment Expo in Atlanta, Georgia, in May 1998.

The release of Birth of the Federation was intended to coincide with the theatrical release of the film Star Trek: Insurrection. Birth of the Federation was released on May 25, 1999, in the United States, and on May 28, in the United Kingdom.

== Reception ==
Reception

Aggregate score
Aggregator	Score
GameRankings	69%

Review scores
Publication	Score
AllGame	4/5
CNET Gamecenter	7/10
Computer Games Strategy Plus	2.5/5
Computer Gaming World	3.5/5
Game Informer	7.25/10
GamePro	2/5
GameRevolution	C+
GameSpot	7.9/10
IGN	5.5/10
Next Generation	2/5
PC Accelerator	7/10
PC Gamer (US)	64%
PC Zone	89%
CNN	7.5/10

The game received average reviews according to the review aggregation website GameRankings. Peter Suciu reviewed the game for CNN, and criticised the computer AI as it didn't portray the races in the same manner as in the television series. For example, the Klingon faction will seek peace agreements when they begin to lose a war, and the Federation will request tributes in order to prevent that faction from attacking the player. He was also disappointed that the earlier ships were still from Star Trek: The Next Generation rather than Star Trek: The Original Series. Suciu felt that the game was on-par with both Master of Orion and Master of Orion II, and said that knowledge of the races "makes for a more compelling game". Keith Ferrell in his review for Computer Gaming World said that whilst the game was "attractively presented", the learning curve was steep and took a long time to play through. However, Daniel Erickson in his review for NextGen called it "A wonderful look at the Star Trek universe, but the actual game is sleep-inducing."

The review in PC Magazine described Birth of the Federation said that the game had a "cool design" and "evocative music". Mark Hill's review in PC Zone praised the turn based strategy mode, but described the battle sequences as "somewhat lacking". He forgave that issue as the rest of the game was so "absorbing", and said that it was an "essential purchase for hard-core strategy nuts." He called it "the best Star Trek game yet."

Trent C. Ward's review for IGN said that while the menu screens were "really cool-looking", they did a poor job when the game became complex because of the expansion of the player's empire during the course of the game. This meant that it could take up to fifteen minutes for each turn because the player would have to constantly click into and out of the various menu systems. As with the review for CNN, the IGN review also criticised the lack of a link between the diplomatic characteristics in the game and those seen in the television series. It summed up the game, saying "Birth of the Federation is nothing more than a frustrating copy of earlier turn based strategy games that doesn't work like it's supposed to. My recommendation is to leave this one on the shelf."

The game entered the British all-format games charts at number five, the second highest new entry for that week. After one week, it dropped to tenth place, and then moved out of the top ten altogether in the week after that.

In 2017, PC Gamer ranked the game among the best Star Trek games.
