= Master of Orion: Conquer the Stars =

2016 video game

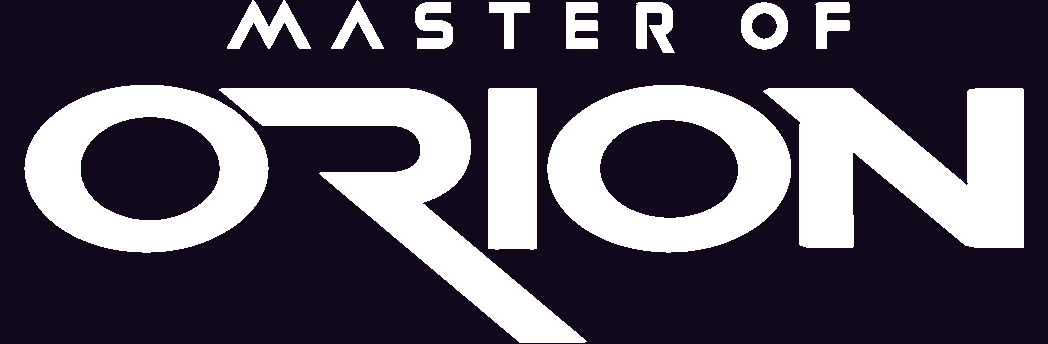
- Developer: Nimble Giant Entertainment
- Publisher: Wargaming
- Composers: David Govett; Dan Schiopucie
- Platforms: Microsoft Windows, OS X, Linux
- Release: WW: August 25, 2016
- Genres: 4X, turn-based strategy
- Modes: Single-player, Multiplayer

Master of Orion: Conquer the Stars (also called simply Master of Orion) is a science fiction turn-based strategy 4X game. It is the fourth game in the Master of Orion series and a reboot of the series, developed by Argentina-based Nimble Giant Entertainment and published by Wargaming. The game was released on Steam Early Access on February 26, 2016, with a full release planned on Microsoft Windows, OS X and Linux later in 2016.

In Master of Orion: Conquer the Stars, the player leads one of 11 playable races (3 additional playable races were released later as DLC) to galactic supremacy through the exploration and colonization of star systems while utilizing diplomacy, conquest and technological developments.

== Gameplay ==
Master of Orion: Conquer the Stars is a turn-based strategy game that lets players take control of one of 14 playable races who can compete or coexist with other AI controlled opponents across vast galaxies. Players can also design a custom race.

In the game, players manage their empire, colonies, technological developments, ship design, inter-species diplomacy, and combat. In Master of Orion, players begin the game with a colonized home world in their solar system. Utilizing colony resources such as Credit Income, Research, Food, and Production, the player can grow their empire, expand their fleet, explore new worlds, increase their resources and trade, and combat other races. Victory is achieved by eliminating all other opponents, winning a vote for peaceful unification, controlling the galactic economy, researching and building three scientific victory structures, defeating the Antaran race, or having the highest score at the end of the last turn.

== Development ==
In 2013, Wargaming acquired the Master of Orion IP from Atari. The game was officially announced on June 9, 2015. A Collector's Edition, which includes all its predecessors (Master of Orion, Master of Orion II: Battle at Antares and Master of Orion III), a new race, an artbook, and an orchestral Soundtrack, was released. In addition, only players who purchased the Collector's Edition were able to play during the early access period.

Several voice actors provided the roles for the reboot, such as Mark Hamill, Michael Dorn, Dwight Schultz, John de Lancie, Alan Tudyk, Kat Cressida, John Kassir, Robert Englund, Troy Baker, Nolan North, JB Blanc, Sara Cravens, Nika Futterman, Jean Gilpin, Misty Lee, Sumalee Montano, Roger Craig Smith, Fred Tatasciore, and Kari Wahlgren. Master of Orion was released on February 26, 2016 for Steam's early access programme, followed by full release on August 25.

== Reception ==
Reception

Aggregate score
Aggregator	Score
Metacritic	74/100

Review scores
Publication	Score
Game Informer	8.25/10
GameSpot	7/10
IGN	7.1/10
PC Gamer (US)	73/100

Master of Orion received generally favourable reviews. Danial Tack from Game Informer gave a generally positive review praising the game's accessibility to newcomers to the 4X genre and called the game "one of the best entry-level 4X games out there". He also remarked that the game's graphics "may be the visual high point for 4X space titles". The game was also praised for its all-star voice acting cast with Mike Mahardy from GameSpot remarking that "the voice acting grounds the alien leaders and makes them feel like real characters".

Leana Hafer of IGN was more critical, calling the game "an unimaginative remake of the 4X classic". She concludes in her review that "there's not much that's outright wrong with Master of Orion, but there's not much memorable or endearing about it either. It's built on a moderately successful but bland execution of the inside-the-box space 4X formula". Leif Johnson of PC Gamer agreed, saying the game "brings little memorable to the genre aside from its personality".
