= Steve Barcia =

Canadian game programmer

Steve Barcia is a game programmer, game producer and entrepreneur, having founded the computer game developer Simtex Studios Inc. in 1988. The company released computer games such as Master of Magic, Master of Orion, Master of Orion II, and 1830: Railroads & Robber Barons the adaptation of the Avalon Hill strategy game 1830. They also developed the unreleased projects Mech Lords and Guardians: Agents of Justice.

Following a corporate takeover in May 2000, Nintendo of America bought Retro Studios. Barcia was elected to replace the founder and then-president Jeff Spangenberg. Under Barcia's leadership, Retro Studios developed and released Metroid Prime. Barcia was replaced by Michael Kelbaugh in April 2003 after Nintendo received numerous complaints about his mismanagement of the company.

After his replacement he took employment at EA Canada in Vancouver where he oversaw production on the Def Jam, SSX, and Need for Speed series.

In 2009, he was chosen by IGN as one of the top 100 game creators of all time.
