= Civilization II: Test of Time =

1999 video game

- Developer: MicroProse Hunt Valley Studio
- Publisher: Hasbro Interactive (Note: Released under the MicroProse label)
- Producer: Alessandro De Lucia
- Designers: John Possidente; Mick Uhl
- Programmer: Stephen L. Cox
- Artists: Steve Martin; Frank Frazier
- Composer: Roland J. Rizzo
- Series: Civilization
- Platform: Windows
- Release: NA: August 9, 1999; UK: August 13, 1999
- Genre: Turn-based strategy
- Modes: Single player, multiplayer

Civilization II: Test of Time is a turn-based strategy game developed by MicroProse's development studio in Hunt Valley, and published by Hasbro Interactive in 1999. It is a remake of the best-selling game Civilization II that was released to compete with Sid Meier's Alpha Centauri. Test of Time's central innovation was the addition of multiple maps and the inclusion of two campaigns concerning science fiction and fantasy themes.

== Development ==
While the Civilization series had little to no direct competitors, this changed in 1999 when Activision created Civilization: Call to Power. Call to Power was a clone title, which also extended the concept to future space/ocean colonization. This led to a legal battle between Activision and Microprose, which was resolved with Activision able to make further Call to Power games as long as they did not use "Civilization" in the title. Microprose's response was to make a spin-off game entitled Civilization II: Test of Time which, like Call to Power, included themes such as the colonization of Alpha Centauri, science fiction, and fantasy. It would later inspire the open-source project Freeciv. This version had its own mods. It was included in the Sid Meier's Civilization Chronicles pack. The British newspaper Daily Mirror ran a competition wherein they would give away ten copies of the game to readers who correctly answered a history-related question.

== Gameplay ==
A screenshot of the revamped graphics

=== The original and extended original campaigns ===
Test of Time included a version of the old Civilization II campaign, with only a few minor changes. Cosmetically, however, it looked quite different, with all-new art and animated units. Test of Time also offered the option to undertake the Extended Original campaign, which was identical to the Original except that the "pink" slot for a civilization was occupied by aliens on Alpha Centauri. When one built the Alpha Centauri spaceship, instead of ending the game, it unlocked a secondary tech tree and allowed the player to colonise Centaurus (a separate map) and battle the Centaurians.

However, on all versions, the "red" slot for a civilization is always occupied by the barbarians (religious fanatics, barbarians, and guerrillas).

=== The science-fiction campaign ===
The Science-Fiction campaign focuses around a mostly fictional planetary system in orbit around the real, nearby star of Lalande 21185. The setup is that the humans along with another species identified only as the "non-humans" both crashland on earthlike Funestis, the second planet. The two species eventually learn to talk with each other and expand to the three other maps, which include the orbital platforms around Funestis left there by the ancient Lalandians, a rocky world called Naumachia, and the center of ancient Lalandian culture, the gas giant Nona. Victory can be accomplished by sending a spaceship back to Earth, by building a quantum gate back to Earth, or by conquering the star system.

=== The fantasy campaign and Midgard ===
Test of Time also included a fantasy world modelled after Norse mythology. The four maps of the Fantasy Campaign are the Surface World, the Underground World, the Cloud World, and the Undersea World. The seven species included each started on a different level. The central difference between Midgard and the Fantasy Campaign are the scripted events and premade maps for Midgard.

The civilizations of the Fantasy Campaign consist of five fantasy races and two human civilizations:

- The Elves
- The Merfolk
- The Goblins
- The Stygians (Undead)
- The Buteo (Bird people)
- The Humans, a human civilization similar to Europeans in the Early Middle Ages
- The Infidels, a human civilization similar to various nomadic Asiatic and Eastern European peoples

The Elves, Humans and Infidels are most suited to the Surface World, while the Merfolk are most suited to the Undersea World, the Stygians and Goblins to the Underground World, and the Buteo to the Cloud World. However, all civilizations initially have access to the Surface World, and, as the game progresses, acquire access to all of the Worlds.

There are three ways to win the Fantasy Campaign. A player may complete a Siege Engine that can conquer all evil, may discover the rainbow Bifrost (of true Norse myth) to seek the aid of the gods, or conquer the world.

==== Midgard scenario ====
The rules of the Fantasy Campaign were originally designed for the Midgard Scenario and then extrapolated into a non-preset environment. The Midgard Scenario is heavily focused on Norse, Slavic and Celtic mythology, with figures such as Baba Yaga and The Dagda and events such as Ragnarok making appearances.

The Midgard scenario centers around the impending escape of the evil wizard Volsang, who was sealed away many centuries prior to the scenario's opening. The seven civilizations have entirely forgotten about the existence of Volsang, and so the weakening of his bonds has gone unnoticed. At the opening of the scenario, Volsang's forces begin to multiply and threaten the civilizations: most immediately the nearby Infidels, but eventually all.

In addition to the three methods of victory in the Fantasy Campaign, a player may also complete a set of ten quests that exist in-game. (This victory results in the immediate discovery of Bifrost, but is a different manner of victory than intense research.) However, due to bugs it is impossible to be able to have completed the 10 quests simultaneously to trigger this victory.

== Reception ==
Reception

Aggregate score
Aggregator	Score
GameRankings	66%

Review scores
Publication	Score
AllGame	3/5
CNET Gamecenter	6/10
Computer Games Strategy Plus	3/5
Computer Gaming World	4/5
Game Informer	7.5/10
GameSpot	4.2/10
IGN	7.8/10
Next Generation	3/5
PC Accelerator	5/10
PC Gamer (UK)	79%

According to Michael Klappenbach of About.com, "The game was generally panned and not well received by both critics and Civilization fans." The game received average reviews according to the review aggregation website GameRankings.

Jonathan Sutyak of AllGame said the game was "for the most part, an improvement over the original." John Lee of NextGen said of the game, "Maybe it's time to say, 'Okay, enough of a good thing. Bring on Civilization III.'"

Joanna Maria of Techshout named it the third best Civilization game.
