= Worlds of Magic =

2015 video game

- Developer: Wastelands Interactive
- Publisher: Wastelands Interactive
- Platforms: Microsoft Windows, PlayStation 4, Xbox One, Nintendo Switch, iOS, Android
- Release: WW: 2015
- Genre: Turn-based strategy
- Mode: Single-player

Worlds of Magic is a single-player fantasy turn-based 4X strategy game developed by Wastelands Interactive and published for Microsoft Windows in 2015. In late 2015 it received a PS4 and Xbox One ports under the name Worlds of Magic: Planar Conquest; which has been sometimes described as an improved sequel. In 2016 Worlds of Magic: Planar Conquest was also released for PC, iOS and Android as Planar Conquest. In 2020 Planar Conquest was ported to Nintendo Switch.

Described as a planned spiritual successor the classic Master of Magic, the game has received mixed reviews.

== Development ==
In April 2013, Polish studio Wastelands Interactive launched a successful Kickstarter bid to fund the game meant as a spiritual successor to Master of Magic, and designer George Edward Purdy who worked on Master of Orion and Master of Magic joined the team. Wastelands Interactive had moved Worlds of Magic into late alpha testing on August 8, 2014. According to the gaming news sites Gamasutra, Worlds of Magic then went into Early Access on September 11. Worlds of Magic was released for PlayStation 4 in the third quarter of 2015 and officially launched at retail outlets and on Steam according to the gaming news site, Gamasutra on March 19, 2015.

Its PS4 release made it, according to Softpedia, the first 4X game available on that platform.

The game has been Wastelands Interactive biggest project up to date.

== Reception ==
=== For Worlds of Magic ===
Reception

Aggregate score
Aggregator	Score
Metacritic	52/100

Worlds of Magic received a 52 score on Metacritic, indicating "Mixed or Average Reviews". A 2015 review for the Rock Paper Shotgun noted that if the Kickstarter budget is any indication, the game only had a fraction of resources for its development compared to similar titles like Age of Wonders III or Endless Legend - and sadly, it shows in the gameplay, calling the game "rickety" not particularly memorable. Likewise, the reviewer for GameSpot criticized many aspects of the game, calling it a "tepid mélange of half-baked ideas and pointless hindrances", suffering from "bland artistic direction and a lack of conviction" and noting "an array of bugs, glitches, and crashes". Two reviewers at explorminate were more positive, noting that it is "an unpolished game that still manages to capture the old-school, hardcore feel and fun of Master of Magic".

=== For Worlds of Magic: Planar Conquest ===
A reviewer for the digitallydownloaded in 2016, reviewing the PS4 version, was more positive, giving it 3.5 out of 5 score, noting that the game has some issues, but "is a lot of fun". Same year, a review in medium for the PS 4 version was more positive, calling the game average with a score of 7/10, mostly criticizing the lackluster graphics. A review of the PC version of Planar Conquest gave it a score of 5/10, praising its "incredible depth" but criticizing "frustrating controls and boring combat".

Reviewing the mobile version of game this year, a reviewer for PocketTactics called it "a very good 4X title for the table", giving it a 3 stars out of 5, noting he would give it 3.5 if the website used half-star ratings, criticizing user interface and SFXes, but praising the level of detail and complexity which are rare for a mobile game.

In 2017 a reviewer at TrueAchievements gave the game a score of 1 out of 5, nothing that despite Xbox One having next to no 4X games, the game is plagued by so many issues, from design to game play, that it is "not better than nothing".

According to PCGamesN note in 2019, "judging by the Steam reviews, it failed to capture the, er, magic of Master of Magic".

In 2020 a reviewer for the Polish game portal gram.pl described its sequel, Worlds of Magic:Planar Conquest, as "significantly improved" compared to the original game. Another reviewer writing for digitallydownloaded summed up the game as "not terrible... just very, very mundane" . A reviewer for WayTooManyGames gave it a score of 3 out 5, criticizing a number of the developer choices as "downright insane and infuriating to the players", resulting in the port for Nintendo Switch as not very playable in the "handheld" mode, although noting the game play when docked is "okay".

== Sequel ==
In 2016 the game received a sequel, Worlds of Magic: Planar Conquest, which in 2020, was also ported to Nintendo Switch.
