= Civilization II: Conflicts in Civilization =

- Developer: MicroProse
- Publisher: MicroProse
- Producer: Kerry Wilkinson
- Designer: Mick Uhl
- Programmer: Kerry Wilkinson
- Artist: Michael O. Haire
- Composer: Roland J. Rizzo
- Series: Civilization
- Platforms: Windows, Mac OS
- Release: 1996
- Genre: Turn-based strategy
- Modes: Single player, multiplayer (with Multiplayer Gold Edition)

Sid Meier's Civilization II Scenarios: Conflicts in Civilization is a single-player historical turn-based strategy game, and the first expansion pack to Civilization II. It contains 20 new scenarios; 12 made by the expansion pack developers, and 8 "Best of the Net" scenarios created by series fans. These were the fan-made scenarios that were "deemed the best by the developers". The game was developed and published by MicroProse. The game was "produced by the players and the development team, including some of the script and the 'new content'". This content contained new worlds, new maps, units, an updated technology tree, and new music. The game also allowed players to create their own custom scenarios. it was released November 25, 1996.

The game was included in the Civilization II Multiplayer Gold Edition and the Sid Meier's Civilization Chronicles Box Set. The latter was released for the 2006 Christmas and holiday season. Ultimate Civ II, a multiplayer version of Civilization II, included both II and Conflicts in Civilization. The game has been donated to the Strong National Museum of Play.

The majority of battles in the scenarios are based on genuine historical events, such as the American Civil War, Alexander the Great's conquests, the Crusades and World War I. However, there are also a few fantasy scenarios including the stopping of an alien invasion, and surviving after a nuclear apocalypse.

== Production ==
While Civilization II included two predetermined gaming scenarios for players as an alternative to the randomly generated worlds of the standard games. However, it was relatively easy for players to make their own, and as a result a torrent of fan-made maps spread online. While Sid Meier and Brian Reynolds left Microprose over disagreements with new management, the company soon released this title as an official add-on. The game was released a mere 9 months after Civilization II. Marc Cromer was the game's composer/sound designer.

Shipment of the game was announced on November 5, 1996.

== Reception ==
Game Zone was dismayed that the game was essentially the same as its predecessor only with a few added scenarios, and also disliked how the Windows version was a bit more expensive too. Wi-Fi.ru said "there is no weak link" in the Civilization series, including this game. On the release of Multiplayer Civilization II: Gold Edition, GameSpot wrote: "despite the inclusion of the two previously released scenario packs...I can't help but think this game is too little, too late". AllGame wrote that the inclusion of the expansion packs "improves upon the original game".
