= Master of Orion II: Battle at Antares =

1996 video game

- North American cover art
- Developer: Simtex
- Publishers: MicroProse (PC); MacSoft (Mac)
- Designers: Steve Barcia; Kenneth Burd
- Programmer: Kenneth Burd
- Artist: Dave Lawell
- Composer: Laura Barratt
- Platforms: MS-DOS, Windows 95, Macintosh
- Release: NA: November 22, 1996; EU: December 16, 1996; NA: 1997 (Mac)
- Genres: Turn-based strategy, 4X
- Modes: Single-player, multiplayer

Master of Orion II: Battle at Antares is a 4X turn-based strategy game set in space, designed by Steve Barcia and Ken Burd, and developed by Simtex, who developed its predecessor Master of Orion and Master of Magic. The PC version was published by MicroProse in 1996, and the Macintosh version a year later by MacSoft, in partnership with MicroProse.

Master of Orion II won the Origins Award for Best Fantasy or Science Fiction Computer Game of 1996, and was well received by critics. It has since come to be regarded a defining benchmark of the space 4X genre, maintaining a large and active fan base.

== Plot ==
Long before the time in which the game is set, two extremely powerful races, the Orions and the Antarans, fought a war that devastated most of the galaxy. The victorious Orions, rather than exterminate the Antarans, imprisoned them in a pocket dimension before departing the galaxy, leaving behind a very powerful robotic warship, the Guardian, to protect their homeworld.

Some time after the game starts, the Antarans, having broken out of their prison dimension, begin to send increasingly powerful fleets against the players' colonies, to destroy them along with any defending ships, before they disappear back to their mysterious realm.

== Gameplay ==
The main screen: the pop-up window displays information about a specific star system, while the large window under it displays the galaxy as a whole.

Master of Orion II is more complex than Master of Orion, incorporating game mechanics from Master of Magic as well as new gameplay options. Three new alien races have been added, and the option for players to design their own custom race. Instead of the one planet per star system found in Master of Orion there are now multiplanet star systems that can be shared with opponents. Food, and the need to balance it, is introduced into the economy. In tactical combat, spaceships can now turn direction and marines can board enemy ships. With the right technology, players can now destroy planets outright. Multiplayer mode includes one-on-one matches and games with up to eight players.

Victory can be gained by military or diplomatic means. There are three routes to victory: conquer all opponents; be elected as the supreme leader of the galaxy; or make a successful assault against the Antaran homeworld. To be elected, a player needs two-thirds of the total votes, and each empire's votes are based on the population under its control. To seek out and defeat the Antarans, a player needs to carry the battle to the Antaran homeworld through a Dimensional Portal. Conquering the Orion star system does not automatically win the game, although doing so provides the powerful Avenger starship and several non-researchable Antaran technologies that make winning much easier.

Master of Orion II provides 13 pre-defined playable races, three of which are additions to those available in Master of Orion. The game also allows players to create custom races, and a group of enthusiasts regard race design as a crucial element of strategy. Each player starts with ten "picks" (race design points). Choosing advantageous traits reduces the number of picks available, while choosing disadvantages increases them, but players cannot choose more than ten picks' worth of disadvantages. Most of the options are major or minor advantages and minor disadvantages in farming, industry, research, population growth, money, space combat, espionage and ground combat. The race design system also offers "special abilities" that have various effects on various aspects of their effectiveness.

The player chooses the empire's form of government, which has almost as much influence on how it performs as the choices described above, but the "best" governments cost a lot of picks. Dictatorships are the most common governments for the pre-defined races, costing no picks while providing appropriately minor bonuses and penalties. Democracy provides major advantages in research and wealth generation, but is the most vulnerable to spying and sabotage. Democracies also cannot annihilate conquered aliens, but do have the fastest assimilation rate. Unification governments provide advantages in farming and industrial output and defense against espionage, but do not benefit from morale and assimilate conquered aliens at the slowest rate. Feudalism provides a large reduction in spaceship construction costs, but suffers from very slow research. The Race Customization screen treats Feudalism as a significant disadvantage. Each government can be upgraded once by research.

Star systems have up to five colonizable planets, and a few have none. Players can colonize all solid planet types, while gas giants and asteroids can be made habitable with the planet construction technology. Colonizable planets vary in several ways, making some more desirable than others. The most desirable systems are usually guarded by space monsters, much less powerful than Orion's Guardian but still a challenge in the early game, when fleets are small and of low technology.

Each player can change each of its colonies' outputs by moving colonists between farming, industry and research. Without food, a colony will starve to death. If an empire has an overall food surplus, it can prevent localized starvation by sending food in freighters, which are produced in groups of five and require a small amount of upkeep when in use. However, a single hostile warship of any size can blockade an entire system, preventing the delivery of food and halving the colonies' outputs of farming and industry. All colonists pay a standard tax to the imperial treasury, and an additional imperial tax may be set on production causing a corresponding reduction of industrial output on all colonies. Players can use surplus money to accelerate industrial production at specified colonies, but not to increase agricultural or research output. The maintenance of buildings costs money, as does maintaining an excessively large fleet. Ships of different sizes use different numbers of "command points". These are provided by orbital bases and communications technology. This limits the size of empires' fleets in the early game, where one can add only one frigate (smallest type of ship) per additional starbase or one battleship (largest type of ship in the early game) per four new starbases without causing the "command rating" to go negative, which is very expensive.

Research, usually followed by construction of appropriate buildings, can improve all aspects of economy and warfare. Falling behind in technology is likely to be fatal. There are eight research areas divided into several levels, each of which contains one to four technologies. To research a higher-level technology, players must first have researched the previous level. Players can also acquire technologies by exchange or diplomatic threats, spying, hiring colonial leaders or ship commanders with knowledge of certain technologies, planetary conquest, dismantling captured enemy ships, random events, or by stumbling upon it in a derelict craft orbiting a newly discovered planet. All weapons and most other combat-related components benefit from miniaturization, in which further advances in the technology area that provides them will reduce the size and production cost of those components. Technological advancements also make available modifications for most weapons, which usually entail a significant increase in their cost and size but can greatly improve their effectiveness in the right situations.

Master of Orion II provides a wide range of diplomatic negotiations: gifts of money or technology or even all the colonies in a star system; opportunities to demand such concessions from other players; technology trades; trade, non-aggression and alliance treaties. The Race Relations screen, accessed by the "Races" button from the Main screen, also enables the player to allocate spies between defensive duties and spying or sabotage against other empires, and to check opponents' technological progress and diplomatic relationships.

Players can design warships, provided they choose the "tactical combat" option in game set-up. There are five ship design slots, but an indefinite number of designs may be in operation. The designs of colony ships, outpost ships and troop transports are fixed. These three ship types can be destroyed instantly by even the weakest combat ship if they travel unescorted. Colony ships, outpost ships, troop transports and warships may benefit from technological advances that increase the range and speed of all of an empire's ships free of charge. Warships can be refitted for a cost to take advantage of technological improvements not available through free upgrades.

Ships can travel to any star system within their range, unlike games such as Space Empires or Master of Orion III, in which interstellar travel is possible only or mainly via "wormholes" and it is possible to set up easily defended choke points.

In Master of Orion II, space combat occurs only within star systems, either over a planet one side is attacking or on the outskirts of a system, if one side is driving away the other's blockaders or trying to prevent an enemy build-up. If the defending side has warships and several colonies in a system, they automatically scramble to defend whichever colony is attacked. In general, enemy colonies can be taken over only after all orbital and planet-based defenses have been destroyed and all defending ships have been destroyed or forced to retreat. A fleet of a Telepathic race can mind-control the colony, unless the defenders also include telepaths. In other cases the only way to seize control of an enemy colony is by invading. In order to do this, the attacking fleet must include some troop transports, which will be lost if the invasion fails, and at least 1 transport will be permanently deployed on the planet if the invasion succeeds. A player cannot control ground combat: the result depends on numbers, ground combat technologies, racial ground combat bonuses, and Leaders with the Commando skill if present. The game displays the progress of the combat and details the ground combat bonuses of each side. Colonies conquered by Telepathic races, either by Mind Control or ground invasion, are instantly loyal to their new owners. Recently occupied colonies by non-Telepaths on the other hand are disaffected, have poor productivity, and may rebel and rejoin the empire which founded them. Productivity slowly improves and the risk of rebellion slowly recedes, and there is a way to speed up these improvements. Instead of invading, a victorious attacker may destroy an enemy colony by various means.

From time to time players are presented with the opportunity to hire leaders, for a hiring fee and usually an annual salary. Colony leaders improve the farming and/or industrial and/or research and/or financial productivity of all colonies in the system to which they are assigned, and some improve the efficiency of defensive or offensive spies. Ship leaders improve the combat effectiveness of their fleet and some improve the fleets' travel speed. A few leaders of both types also improve the performance of ground troops under their command, or contribute directly to a player's finances, or attract other leaders for a reduced hiring fee.

From time to time there are lucky breaks, disasters or emergencies which are not caused by any player's actions. These random events can be disabled in the Game Setup screen.

The Colonies screen, with sort buttons along the bottom. The cursor (hand) on the right is about to open a colony's Build screen.

Players can manage their economies almost entirely from the Colonies screen. The Colonies screen allows the player to access any colony's Build screen, and to change a colony's output by moving colonists between Farmers, Workers and Scientists. The Build screen allows the player to queue up to seven items for construction at a colony, to refit ships in that colony's system and to design ships that may then be built at any colony.

At the start of each turn, Master of Orion II shows a report in which items related to a colony link to the appropriate colony's Build screen, usually when a construction project has been completed.

== Development ==
The game was designed by Steve Barcia and Ken Burd, and developed by Barcia's company Simtex, which had previously developed Master of Orion, published in 1993 by MicroProse. For Master of Orion II, Simtex provided additional pre-defined races, the option to create custom races, and multiplayer options. The first "Orion" game's graphics had also been heavily criticized, and the second included higher-quality artwork displayed at a higher resolution.

The main contributions were: design by Steve Barcia (lead designer), programming by Ken Burd (lead programmer) and five others; art by Dave Lawell (lead artist) and eight others; music by Laura Barratt; sound by John Henke.

In June 1995, MicroProse agreed to buy Simtex, and turned it into an internal development division. The acquisition continued to be known as "Simtex Software", and the Simtex logo appears briefly before MicroProse's while MOO II is loading. MicroProse released Master of Orion II: Battle at Antares for IBM-compatible PCs in 1996, and an Apple Macintosh version was published a year later by MicroProse in partnership with MacSoft.

== Reception ==
=== Sales ===
Master of Orion II secured 10th place on PC Data's computer game sales chart for the month of November 1996. It remained in the top 20 for the next two months, in positions 17 and 20, respectively. By mid-January 1997, its global sales had surpassed 200,000 copies.

=== Reviews ===
Reception

Aggregate scores
| Aggregator | Score |
|---|---|
| GameRankings | 82.8% (PC) |
| Metacritic | 84% |

Review scores
| Publication | Score |
|---|---|
| GameSpot | 8.7/10 |
| Next Generation | 3/5 |
| Gamer's Zone | 3/5 |
| Macworld | 4/5 |
| Strategy Plus | 3.5/5 |

Reviews were generally favorable, and the game won the Origins Award for Best Fantasy or Science Fiction Computer Game of 1996. However, reviewers differed in regard to the new gameplay features and micromanagement. B. Geryk preferred the simpler approach of Master of Orion, while Tom Chick found the gameplay easy to manage and much more engaging than Master of Orion. Robert Mayer of Strategy Plus argued that the concepts are good but the interface makes it needlessly difficult to access information vital to managing them. GameSpot's Trent Ward said the game's micromanagement is "everything that the hard-core veteran dreams of", but noted that strategy game novices would find it inaccessible. Offering yet another opinion, Next Generation found the difference from Master of Orion to be minor, concluding that "perhaps the biggest problem is that the game is a little too stagnant, and doesn't really break new ground in the now-crowded galactic conquest genre".

Reviewers criticized that the race traits are unbalanced, with "creative" in particular being overpowered, but praised the replay value provided by the wide range of galaxies, races and other options. Macworld's Michael Gowan wrote that Master of Orion II's "countless strategy options will keep you coming back for more".

Complaints that the loading of artwork from CD made the game run slowly led to recommendations to download the entire CD onto hard disk before play. Cale Corbett, reviewing the Mac version, complained that the user interface was "clunky", as it lacked features common in programs originally developed for the Mac.

Master of Orion II was a finalist for the Computer Game Developers Conference's 1996 "Best Strategy/War Game" Spotlight Award, but lost the prize to Command & Conquer: Red Alert. It was also nominated as Computer Games Strategy Plus's 1996 turn-based strategy game of the year, although it lost to Civilization II. The game was a finalist for Computer Gaming World's 1996 "Strategy Game of the Year" award, again losing to Civilization II.

Master of Orion II was named the 39th best computer game ever by PC Gamer UK in 1997.

== Legacy ==
The Master of Orion series set a new standard for space-based 4X games, with a retrospective review by Chick describing it as "a towering monolith in the genre that has cast an eight-year-long shadow over everything that's followed... Master of Orion is still the definitive name in space opera games". In the same review, Chick added that Master of Orion II and its predecessor Master of Orion "loom large" in any discussion of science fiction strategy games. Master of Orion II has both influenced the subsequent development of such games and invited comparisons in reviews, with a 2006 GameSpot review describing it as "the pinnacle of the genre".

Other games have been noted for their similarities and differences with Master of Orion II. One review of Space Empires IV made several comparisons with Master of Orion II, commenting favorably on the complex tactical combat, while criticizing the relatively "sparse graphics and sound", concluding that it was the most sophisticated game available in the genre, but that it built "on the basic foundation of Master of Orion" instead of "breaking new ground". Other games which have been compared with Master of Orion II include Galactic Civilizations II, which James Lombardi praised as standing "proudly next to its famed predecessor" (although it "did not include the tactical battle option like Masters of Orion II"), and Lost Empire: Immortals, whose scale was criticised as "soulless" (relative to Masters of Orion) by Jason Ocampo.
