= Champions of Regnum =

2007 video game

- Developer: Nimble Giant Entertainment
- Publisher: Nimble Giant Entertainment
- Platforms: Windows, OS X, Linux
- Release: May 24, 2007
- Genre: Massively multiplayer online role-playing game
- Mode: Multiplayer

Champions of Regnum (previously known as Regnum Online) is a fantasy massively multiplayer online role-playing game (MMORPG) developed and published by Nimble Giant Entertainment, a game development studio located in Argentina. The game focuses on full Realm vs Realm team player vs player combat, with a three-way war constantly in progress over forts and castles. There are monsters and an element of grinding, but these are considered secondary to the war. It was released on May 24, 2007.

The name Regnum means realm in Latin, and is also a tribute to one of the first games published in Argentina by some of the team members, which was named Regnum.

== Overview ==
Players create characters as their avatars in a fantasy medieval-themed persistent virtual world. Individual appearance of characters is customisable. The player has to choose between three realms: Alsius, Ignis and Syrtis, with each having their own races. Players then level up by grinding on monsters or with quests.

=== Steam launch ===
Champions of Regnum was launched on steam in February 2013 to mixed reviews.

== Gameplay ==
The inspiration for Regnum Online is the online game Dark Age of Camelot (DAOC). As such, RO is heavily focussed on Realm vs Realm (also known as faction pvp or team pvp) combat. In general, at all times a player can find active wars occurring in the "Warzone" where players of the 3 realms fight for control of forts, gates and castles. Players can choose the realms of Alsius, Ignis and Syrtis. Each realm has four races, and some of the races are essentially the same across the three realms. For example, each realm has a race of humans, and each realm has "lamai".

The differences between the races of the three realms is cosmetic as all share the same character classes and powers. Alsius is a snowy realm, Ignis is a desert realm and Syrtis is a grassy realm.

Regnum offers the three standard character classes: archer, warrior and mage. Each class is further offered two specialisations. At present, the full range of classes are: Marksman, Hunter, Barbarian, Knight, Warlock and Conjurer.

Combat skills, stealth and spells are drawn primarily from the lore of DAOC and Dungeons & Dragons, with much shorter durations and magnified effects. The movement controls take place by the use of the W, A, S and D movement keys or mouse clicking nearby locations. Each class has a unique skill tree.

Along with many side quests, there are storyline quests that reveal things about each realms past and the war between them. Quests reward players with experience, gold, and some items that they could not obtain otherwise. There are also player versus player quests which require the player to accomplish a certain task such as killing a certain amount number of players from another realm or holding a specific location for a certain amount of time.

== Development ==
Former logo as Regnum Online

Andrés Chilkowski worked on Regnum, a real time strategy video game, published by Conde Entertainment Software in 1995. He was the team leader of the project, working with his friend. They wished to create an RTS game similar to Dune II, leading to the development of Regnum. The friend served as a designer and script writer. After releasing the title, Conde would release a few more games before closing down from financial difficulties. In 2002, Andrés opened up NGD Studios and started working on Regnum Online.

== Reception ==
Strana Igr said the game is surprisingly good for a low-budget MMORPG. Massively wrote: "I have a feeling that if Regnum Online could make its beginning levels, you know, fun, then it could be a great game." Softpedia summarized: "Champions of Regnum packs all the cliches one can remember when it comes to free-to-play MMOs. However, that's not to say it's awful, although there are far better alternatives out there."

In 2012, the game was said to be very popular in Latin America and Germany. It has also been called the biggest MMORPG made in Latin America.
