= Nimble Giant Entertainment =

Argentine video game developer

Nimble Giant Entertainment, SA
- Formerly: NGD Studios (2002–2019)
- Type: Subsidiary
- Industry: Video games
- Founded: 2002; 24 years ago
- Headquarters: Buenos Aires, Argentina
- Number of locations: 4 (2022)
- Key people: Martín Cao (CEO); Andrés Chilkowski (CCO); Lucas Wall (COO); Nicolas Maier (CTO)
- Number of employees: 160 (2022)
- Parent: Saber Interactive (2020–present)
- Website: nimblegiant.com

Nimble Giant Entertainment, SA (formerly known as NGD Studios) is an Argentine video game developer located in Buenos Aires, Argentina. The studio was acquired by Saber Interactive in 2020.

== History ==
They started as a three group fusion and they first created a game for a construction kit toy called Mis Ladrillos, which is similar to Lego toys.

In 2004, Nimble Giant created a mobile gaming division, making games for known brands like Axe and doing development for the multinational GlobalFun. After releasing some successful games, GlobalFun acquired the mobile division from NGD Studios in 2007.

The company is currently continuing development of a real-time, 3D massively multiplayer online role-playing game (MMORPG) which emphasizes flexible gameplay and dynamic content. The game is called Regnum Online, and it has been in development for five years before ended up being released during the first quarter of 2007. The game was intended for the Spanish-speaking market at the beginning but then improved enough to be targeted for other zones as well, more recently the game has struggled to maintain a critical population and has scaled back some of its international servers.

The game currently officially supports English, Spanish, German, French and Dutch but they have stated plans to open the translation tools so volunteers can incorporate other languages.

The game uses a proprietary engine called NG3D which was built from scratch with massive multiplayer games in mind. It supports a variety of features found in today's engines, such as hardware shaders support, continuous world loading, asynchronous resource management and a flexible gameplay system.

Regnum Online was officially released on May 24, 2007. Any information about future expansions and features have been not disclosed yet. With the update of the NG3D engine, Nimble Giant Entertainment made graphic updates on Regnum Online. In 2011, they released a game called Bunch of Heroes, made with the new NG3D 2.0, and in 2013, they changed the game title to Champions of Regnum. In 2012, they helped on developing a game called Maldark: Conqueror of Worlds with Cartoon Network.

In late 2016, NGD acquired Red Katana, a developer founded in 2010, making its founder, Martín Cao, to replace Andrés Chilkowski as chief executive officer.

In May 2019, NGD Studios was rebranded as Nimble Giant Entertainment with the hiring of former Rockstar Games executive Jeronimo Barrera as its vice president of product development, however he left the studio in June 2020.

In November 2020, Embracer Group announced that they acquired the company through Saber Interactive, which will be the parent company. Nimble Giant partnered with Paradox Interactive for Star Trek: Infinite, a grand strategy video game set in the Star Trek universe. After two previous rounds of layoffs in 2023, Embrace cut another 30 jobs on January 30, 2024. In March 2024, Saber was sold to Beacon Interactive, a new company from Saber co-founder Matthew Karch. Many of Saber's studios, including Nimble Giant, were included in the sale.

== List of games ==
Year	Title	Platform(s)	Publisher(s)	Notes
2002	Mis Ladrillos Interactivo	Microsoft Windows	Mis Ladrillos	
2003	Mis Ladrillos Interactivo: El Misterio de los Ladrillos Maestros	Microsoft Windows	Mis Ladrillos	
2004	Absolute Puzzle	J2ME	GlobalFun	
2004	Clear Out	J2ME	GlobalFun	
2004	Axe - Marcales el Camino	J2ME	GlobalFun	
2005	Billy the Kid: Wanted	J2ME	GlobalFun	
2006	Great Legends: Billy the Kid II	J2ME	GlobalFun	
2006	Absolute Puzzle Split	J2ME	GlobalFun	
2007	Great Legends: Vikings	J2ME	GlobalFun	
2008	Axe - Tetris	J2ME	GlobalFun	
2009	Absolute Puzzle Deluxe	J2ME	GlobalFun	
2011	Bunch of Heroes	Microsoft Windows	Nimble Giant Entertainment	
2011	Realms Online	Macintosh; Microsoft Windows	Nimble Giant Entertainment	
2012	Maldark: Conqueror of Worlds	Microsoft Windows	Cartoon Network Games	
2013	Champions of Regnum	Linux; Macintosh; Microsoft Windows	Nimble Giant Entertainment	
2014	Adventure Time: Finn & Jake's Epic Quest	Microsoft Windows	Cartoon Network Games	
2016	Master of Orion: Conquer the Stars	Linux; Macintosh; Microsoft Windows	Wargaming	
2019	Drone Strike Force	Microsoft Windows	Odisi Games	
2020	Quantum League	Microsoft Windows; PlayStation 4 Xbox One; Nintendo Switch	Nimble Giant Entertainment	
2020	Rocket Arena	PlayStation 4 Xbox One; Microsoft Windows	Electronic Arts	Co-developed with Final Strike Games
2021	Hellbound	Microsoft Windows	Nimble Giant Entertainment	Developed by Saibot Studios
2023	Star Trek: Infinite	Microsoft Windows; Macintosh	Paradox Interactive	
