= Master of Magic (2022 video game) =

Strategy game by Slitherine Software

- Developer: MuHa Games
- Publisher: Slitherine Software
- Platform: Windows
- Release: December 2022
- Genres: 4X, turn-based strategy
- Mode: Single-player

Master of Magic is a single-player fantasy turn-based 4X strategy game developed by MuHa Games and published by Slitherine Software, in which the player plays as a wizard attempting to dominate two linked worlds. From a small settlement, the player manages resources, builds cities and armies, and researches spells, growing an empire and fighting the other wizards. The gameplay of the game, both the original and the remake, has been compared to the classic video game Civilization, enhanced with features like heroes and magic.

The game is a remake of the 1994 MS-DOS game Master of Magic by MicroProse.

== Development ==
The game was announced in August 2019 and released in December 2022. It was developed by MuHa Games, a small Polish-based studio and published by Slitherine Software.

== Gameplay ==
The game is a remake of the 1994 MS-DOS classic of the same name by MicroProse. The gameplay of the game, both the original and the remake, has been compared to the classic video game Civilization, enhanced with features like heroes and magic. Both the original and the remake feature five schools of magic, which many reviewers believe was inspired by the card game Magic the Gathering.

A world is randomly generated every time the player starts a new game, with the player being able to adjust a number of features. The player - a wizard in control of newly founded magic kingdom - can customize the skills, spell choices and appearance of their wizard, choosing one of 14 races for the starting city. The gameplay starts with the player in control of his first small settlement and military unit. The player will use that and further units to explore their surroundings, pushing back the strategic map's fog of war. During exploration, the player defeats monsters that are guarding treasure, finds the best locations for new cities, conquers existing ones, recruit heroes, equip them with magical artifacts, and steadily expands their magic kingdom, eventually coming into conflict with other kingdoms controlled by AI-run wizards.

The game is played over a large number (hundreds if not more) of turns with the player presented with a bird's eye (isometric) view of the world. A tactical battle begins when two armies occupy the same hex on the global map. The battle takes place in a tactical, also isometric map, that expands the contested hex in detail (including fortifications and terrain aspects that affect movement and combat). The two forces are arrayed at opposite edges of the map and the battle is conducted in a series of turns. One side achieves victory by eliminating the other or forcing it to flee the combat.

== Plot and setting ==
Master of Magic, just like its predecessor, has no story outside of pitting several wizards in control of magical kingdoms, each aiming to become the one and only ruler of the worlds. Worlds, plural, as the game setting are two worlds, Arcanus and Myrror. Arcanus is a land much like the Earth, with climatic zones and varied terrain like forests, oceans, grasslands and deserts. Myrror is a parallel world to Arcanus, featuring heavier magic use and fantastic flora, minerals and fauna not found on Arcanus. The two worlds are physically linked to each other by special portals called Towers of Wizardry, allowing units to travel between worlds.

== Reception ==
The game received an aggregate score of 75/100 on Metacritic, indicating "generally favorable reviews".

Most reviews agreed that the game is a very faithful recreation of the original, although some reviewers noted that this is both a strength and a weakness of the game, as its retro feel (mechanics-wise) can be a bit challenging to newer players. One of the minor complaints expressed by several reviewers was the pace of the game, particularly in the beginning, is relatively slow, something that is less common in modern games, where there is more to do from the very beginning.

The reviewer for IGN Italia noted that the game's "only and greatest flaw" is the very lackluster diplomacy menu, which seems even simpler than the relatively few options provided by the original game. They concluded that the remake is "a labor of love to the original game... created with great respect and expertise." Several other reviewers likewise commented on the simple diplomatic system as the area of the game that could use the most improvements.

The reviewers for PC Gamer and Rock, Paper, Shotgun noted that the game is less about balance and more about telling stories due to a high number of combinations, with the former commenting that on the "seemingly endless cocktail of armies, world-altering spells and items there is the potential for one of those petri dish experiences: a game that may not look like much, but has the potential to create epic stories", and the latter, that

Both Masters Of Magic are about choosing your own combination of powers with little regard for what's fair and equal, and seeing what you can make of them. It's a tradition that eschews balance for imagination, letting you pick Sorcery Halflings and Death Lizards, just to try it.
