= Master of Orion =

1993 video game

- Developers: Simtex; Take-Two (Mac)
- Publisher: MicroProse
- Producer: Jeff Johannigman
- Designer: Steve Barcia
- Composer: David Govett
- Platforms: MS-DOS, Mac OS
- Release: September 1993; 1995 (Mac)
- Genres: Turn-based strategy, 4X
- Mode: Single-player

Master of Orion (abbreviated as MoO) is a turn-based, 4X science fiction strategy game in which the player leads one of ten races to dominate the galaxy through a combination of diplomacy and conquest while developing technology, exploring and colonizing star systems.

Sometimes described as a scifi-themed spin-off of classic Civilization, the game has proven to be quite enduring, becoming a cult classic in its niche of sci-fi-themed 4X strategy games. It has received several direct sequels, and additionally, a number of other games published since have been described as inspired by it, with reviewers and players divided on whether any has succeeded at recapturing the feeling and gameplay of the original.

The game was released in 1993 by MicroProse on the MS-DOS operating system. It was ported to Mac OS in 1995 by Take-Two Interactive and distributed by GameTek. It is the first in its franchise, and the rights are held by Wargaming.

== Gameplay ==
Master of Orion is a turn-based game. In the first iteration of the franchise, one can only play against the artificial intelligence (AI). Human and AI players control the management of colonies, technology development, ship construction, inter-species diplomacy, and combat.

The software generates a map randomly at the start of each game; the player can only choose the size of the galaxy, and the number and difficulty of AI opponents. In the first game, star systems have at most one colonizable planet and a few have none. Later games have more planets.

Master of Orion has 10 playable races, each with a specialty. For instance, the Humans have advantages in trade and diplomacy; the Bulrathi are the best at ground combat; the Silicoids ignore pollution and can colonize even the most hostile planets, but have slow population growth. Each race is predisposed to like or dislike some of the other races, and is advantaged or disadvantaged in different research fields. The other 7 races are; Alkari, Darloks, Klackons, Meklar, Mrrshan, Sakkra, and Psilon.

The game begins with a single homeworld, one colony ship, and two scout ships that can be used to explore nearby stars. The game will sometimes produce random events which can be harmful or advantageous. One planet is Orion, "throne-world of the Ancients" and most valuable research site in the galaxy, protected by a powerful warship, the Guardian. Victory is gained either by eliminating all opponents or by winning a vote on peaceful unification.

There are seven normal and six hostile planet types. The various hostile types require increasingly advanced technology to colonize. Size determines the planet's initial population capacity. Mineral wealth dramatically influences a colony's industrial productivity while Habitability influences population growth rates. Hostile planets are the most likely to be rich or ultra-rich in minerals. Artifact worlds contain relics of a now-vanished advanced civilization. All planets can be upgraded to Gaia class with the appropriate technologies. Planets can be upgraded in three ways:

- Terraforming increases population capacity by a fixed amount for each tech level achieved, up to a maximum of 120 extra units.
- Soil enrichment increases a planet's population capacity and growth rate but can not be used on hostile planets. The advanced version increases capacity by up to 50% of its initial value and doubles the rate of population growth. Growth is increased by assigning the planet the modifier "Fertile", and then eventually "Gaia".
- Atmospheric terraforming converts hostile planets to normal ones, making soil enrichment possible there.

Planet type does not affect the costs and benefits of terraforming and soil enrichment.

The main screen, showing the planetary management controls on the right.

Sliders are used to allocate a colony's output between ship construction, planetary defenses, factory construction, ecology, and research. Planetary population generates production, especially when assisted by factories. There is a limit on the number of factories a unit of population can operate, but building upgrades can increase this. Defense spending is used to build additional missile bases, upgrade missile bases or planetary shields. Military and spy maintenance is deducted from every colony's production. A planet's output can also be transferred to the treasury at a loss.

Ships can travel to any star system within their range and combat always occurs in orbit over a planet - it is impossible to intercept enemy ships in deep space. Players can control space combat manually or ask the software to resolve combat automatically.

=== Technology ===
The designers regard technology as the most important contribution to a player's success. Funding can be put into one or all of the game's six independent tech tree fields, including Computers, Construction, Force Fields, Planetology, spaceship Propulsion, and Weapons.

If a ship uses a component from a particular technology area, further advances in that area reduce the cost and size of the component; this effect is called "miniaturization". When one has researched all of the technologies in an area of the tech tree, further research can discover "advanced technologies" in that area, which do not provide specific new capabilities but increase the miniaturization of ship components.

Battles are almost always decided by numbers and technology rather than by clever tactics. Players can design and use their own ships. There are four hull sizes; smaller sizes are harder to hit while larger ships can survive more damage and hold more components. There are eight types of components, each with different effects. Only six ship designs can be used at a time.

=== Weapons ===
Weapons are used in combat, and can be mounted to ships or given to ground units. When on ships, weapons are often unique and have their own effects, with their own cost and space taken up. Weapons for ground troops make ground defense and attacks more effective.

==== Special weapons ====
Special weapons are a branch-off of weapons, which do not take up standard weapon slots, rather special slots. these cannot be stacked, unlike standard weapons. They have much more unique effects, and some just make other weapons better, rather than dealing damage themselves.

==== Biological weapons ====
Biological weapons are designed exclusively for use in attacking planets. They destroy enemy population points and reduce the target's habitability (i.e., its maximum population size), leaving any missile bases and factories there intact. Use of these weapons causes political fallout and every other player in the game shifts a level toward despising their user. Biological defenses, the Bio-Toxin Antidote and Universal Antidote, prevent the loss of 1 and 2 million in population per biological attack respectively. However, neither reduce the damage done by biological attacks to a planet's habitability.

==== Bombs ====
Bombs are weapons which are designed to attack planets rather than enemy ships. They deal more damage than any other weapon type to colonies, but cannot target ships, and always have the minimum possible range.

=== Diplomacy ===
Master of Orion provides a wide range of diplomatic negotiations: gifts of money or technology; one-time technology trades; trade pacts that boost industrial output; non-aggression and alliance treaties. Players can also threaten each other, declare war and arrange cease-fires. Each AI player remembers others' actions, both positive and negative, and will be unwilling to form alliances with a player who has broken previous treaties with it.

Under AI control, each race has a ruler personality and an objective, such as Xenophobic Expansionist or Pacifistic Technologist. These traits guide their politics and economic management; for example militarists maintain large fleets and prioritize technologies which have military benefits, while ecologists put a lot of effort into pollution control and terraforming. Traits vary from game to game. Each race has most probable traits and avoids their opposites. Races may occasionally revolt and change traits, but players can force a revolt, and turn the population against the leader using spies.

=== War ===
Hostile actions do not automatically cause war. Clashes are even expected at the opening of the game, when all sides are sending probes out into the unknown. On the other extreme, a ground assault must be knowingly targeted at an inhabited planet, and is a massive provocation.

Colonies can be bombed from space, or taken in ground invasions. Ground invasions can be conducted through enemy defenses. Present enemy ships or missile bases will fire on the approaching transports, possibly destroying some or all of them. The invasion itself is fully automatic. Results depend on numbers, technology and (if one of the races involved is Bulrathi) racial ground combat bonus.

Invasion is expensive. In the first game, there are no special soldier units: the colonial population itself is sent to fight, exterminate the existing inhabitants, and form a new planetary population. The production capacity of any remaining factories can be gleaned, and plundered of technologies if enough factories survived the attack. Controlling a new system extends the range of the invader's ships.

== Development ==
Master of Orion is a significantly expanded and refined version of the prototype/predecessor game Star Lords (not to be confused with Starlord, also released by MicroProse in 1993). Steve Barcia's game development company Simtex demonstrated Star Lords to MicroProse and gaming journalist Alan Emrich who, along with Tom Hughes, assisted Barcia in refining the design to produce Master of Orion; and the game's manual thanks them for their contributions. Emrich and Hughes later wrote the strategy guide for the finished product. MicroProse published the final version of the game in 1994.

Star Lords, often called Master of Orion 0 by fans, was a prototype and never commercially released (its intro opens with "SimTex Software and Your Company present"). The crude but fully playable prototype was made available as freeware in 2001, stripped of all documentation and copy protection, in anticipation of the launch of Master of Orion III. Major differences between Star Lords and Master of Orion include inferior graphics and interface, simpler trade and diplomacy, undirected research, a lack of safeguards to prevent players from building more factories than are usable and the use of transports rather than colony ships to colonize new planets. One feature of Star Lords that Master of Orion lacks is a table of relations between the computer-controlled races. The game was eventually made available for download on FilePlanet and the home page for Master of Orion III.

== Reception ==
Reception

Review scores
Publication	Score
AllGame	5/5
Computer Gaming World	4.5/5
Next Generation	2/5

Master of Orion sold over 100,000 copies. It also received strong reviews. Emrich in a September 1993 Computer Gaming World preview described Master of Orion as "the best that galactic conquest can offer", and summarized its type of gameplay as "4X", meaning "eXplore, eXpand, eXploit, eXterminate". He and later commentators noted earlier examples of this genre, including Civilization (1991) and Reach for the Stars (1983). The magazine's full December 1993 review stated that "Master of Orion is one of those games where one must actually put effort into finding something inadequate about the game design, and that in itself is probably the highest praise this reviewer can give a product". The magazine concluded that it was "a definite Game of the Year candidate as well as Exhibit A in many divorce cases". A February 1994 survey of space war games gave Master of Orion a grade of A−, stating that "it's still conquest, but it's conquest that begins to have an interesting point to it". The reviewer wished that the game supported multiple players, but predicted that "I think MOO will safely reign supreme well into the new year". A 1994 survey of strategic space games set in the year 2000 and later gave the game four-plus stars out of five, saying that it was "a richly-textured product. Graphics coupled with high play yield a high recommendation".

Next Generation reviewed the Macintosh version of the game, rating it two stars out of five, calling the game as "strategy game of the year, NOT".

Master of Orion was named the best strategy game of 1993 by Computer Games Strategy Plus. It also won Computer Gaming World's Strategy Game of the Year award in June 1994. The editors called it "a game that is worthy of being called 'Civilization in Space'", and wrote that it "epitomizes and expands the 'Conquer the Galaxy' motif in strategy gaming".

== Legacy ==
In 1996, Computer Gaming World ranked Master of Orion as the 33rd best game of all time. In 1998, PC Gamer declared it the 45th-best computer game ever released, and the editors called it "a great sci-fi space epic". In 2003, IGN ranked it as the 98th top game. Master of Orion is a member of both GameSpy's Hall of Fame (2001) and GameSpot's list of the greatest games of all time. The Gamer included it in their list of top 10 games in the 4X genre.

In retrospective reviews, Allgame, GameSpot and IGN regarded MoO as the standard by which turn based strategy games set in space are judged.

=== Sequels ===
Three commercial sequels to Master of Orion have been released, Master of Orion II: Battle at Antares, Master of Orion III and Master of Orion: Conquer the Stars. The sequels are significantly more advanced in graphics and sound and feature large differences in gameplay, with some players claiming the original game remains the best version of the series.

In 1997, MicroProse released a Master of Orion "Jr." scenario as part of the Civ II: Fantastic Worlds expansion for Civilization II. In 2001, Star Lords, developed as Master of Orion prototype, was released as freeware as part of the promotion for Master of Orion III. Also a potential future release of the MOO and MOO2 source code was indicated by the MOO3 developers in 2001. In 2011, a clone of MoO II, titled Starbase Orion, was published by Chimera Software, LLC for the iPhone. The game setting has been the influence of Russian writer Sergey Lukyanenko's trilogy, the Line of Delirium.

In July 2013, Wargaming bought the Master of Orion franchise from the Atari bankruptcy proceedings. A "reimagining" subtitled Conquer the Stars was released on August 25, 2016.

=== Influence ===
Master of Orion became an influence on future space strategy games. It was the first game to be described as a 4X game, and helped establish the conventions for the genre going forward. The team behind Stellaris based their game partially on the Master of Orion series, but also said it was important to "try new things and leave the old formulas from the 90s behind". Writer George R. R. Martin mentioned it among the games he used to play most often.

== See also ==
- Master of Magic
