= Simtex =

American video game developer (1988–1997)

Simtex Software
- Industry: Video games
- Founded: 1988
- Defunct: 1997
- Headquarters: Austin, Texas
- Key people: Steve Barcia
- Products: Master of Orion; Master of Magic; 1830

Simtex Software was a video game developer established by Steve Barcia in 1988. It created a number of turn-based strategy games for the PC, most notably the first two Master of Orion games. The company closed in 1997.

== History ==
Spectrum HoloByte acquired SimTex in 1995.

== Games ==
- Master of Orion (1993)
- Master of Magic (1994)
- 1830: Railroads & Robber Barons (1995)
- Master of Orion II: Battle at Antares (1996)
- Mech Lords (renamed Metal Lords during development following FASA dispute) (1995 — unreleased)
- Guardians: Agents of Justice (in development at time of closure — never finished)

The rights to Simtex's games were held by Atari until sold to various parties in a 2013 auction. Wargaming now owns the rights to the Master of Orion series, while Slitherine holds the publishing rights to Master of Magic; it is eXtremePro Group Inc, that owns the full IP, based on trademark records. A third Master of Orion game named Master of Orion III was published by Atari (a subsidiary company of Infogrames) in 2003, having been developed by Quicksilver Software.
