= Freeciv =

Open-source turn-based strategy game

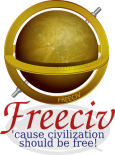
- Logo

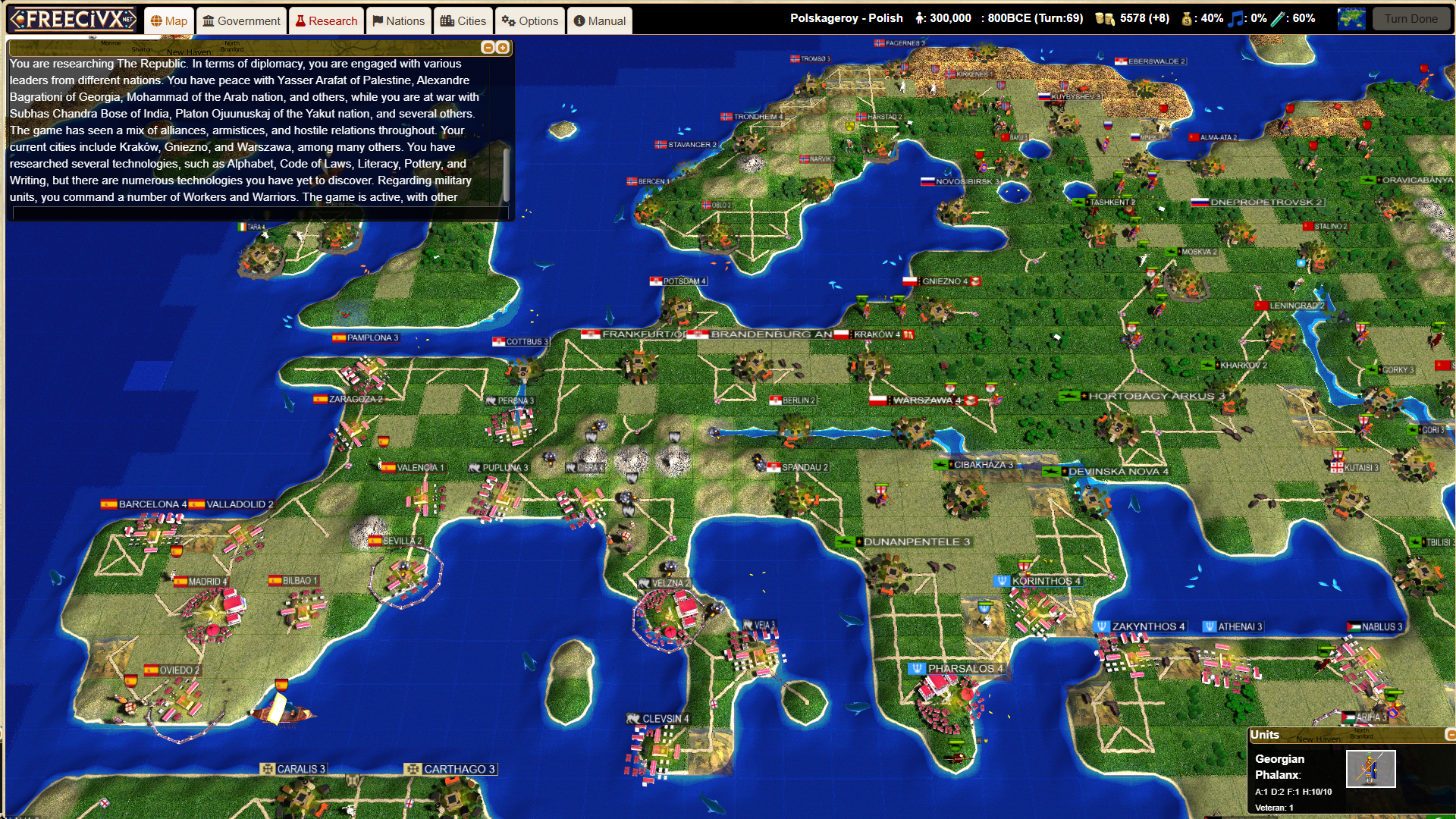
- Freeciv WebGL 3D
- Original authors: Peter Unold, Claus Leth Gregersen, Allan Ove Kjeldbjerg
- Developer: The Freeciv project
- Release: 5 January 1996; 30 years ago
- Stable release: 3.2.4 / 21 March 2026; 7 months ago
- Written in: C, Lua, JavaScript
- Engine: Simple DirectMedia Layer; GTK; Qt
- Operating system: Unix-like, Windows, more
- Available in: 33 languages (some incomplete)
- Type: Turn-based 4X strategy video game
- License: Freeciv: GPL-2.0-or-later; Freeciv-web: AGPL-3.0-or-later
- Website: https://www.freeciv.org
- Repository: https://github.com/freeciv/

Freeciv is a single- and multiplayer turn-based strategy game for workstations and personal computers inspired by the proprietary Sid Meier's Civilization series. It is available for most desktop computer operating systems and available in an online browser version. Released under the GNU GPL-2.0-or-later, Freeciv is free and open-source software. The game's default settings are closest to Civilization II, in both gameplay and graphics, including the units and the isometric grid. However, with a lot of multiplayer games being played in longturn communities, rulesets and additional variants have evolved away from the original ruleset. Freeciv is playable online on various public and private servers.

Players take the role of tribal leaders in 4000 B.C. who must guide their peoples through the centuries. Over time, new technologies are discovered, which allow the construction of new city buildings and the deployment of new units. Players can wage war on one another or form diplomatic relationships.

The game ends when one civilization has eradicated all others or accomplished the goal of space colonization, or at a given deadline. If more than one civilization remains at the deadline, the player with the highest score wins. Points are awarded for the size of a civilization, its wealth, and cultural and scientific advances.

== History ==
At the computer science department at Aarhus University, three students, avid players of XPilot and of Sid Meier's Civilization, which was a stand-alone PC game for MS-DOS, decided to find out whether the two could be fused into an X-based multiplayer Civilization-like strategy game. The students—Peter Unold, Claus Leth Gregersen and Allan Ove Kjeldbjerg—started development in November 1995; the first playable version was released in January 1996, with bugfixing and small enhancements until April. The rules of the game were close to Civilization, while the client/server architecture was basically that of XPilot.

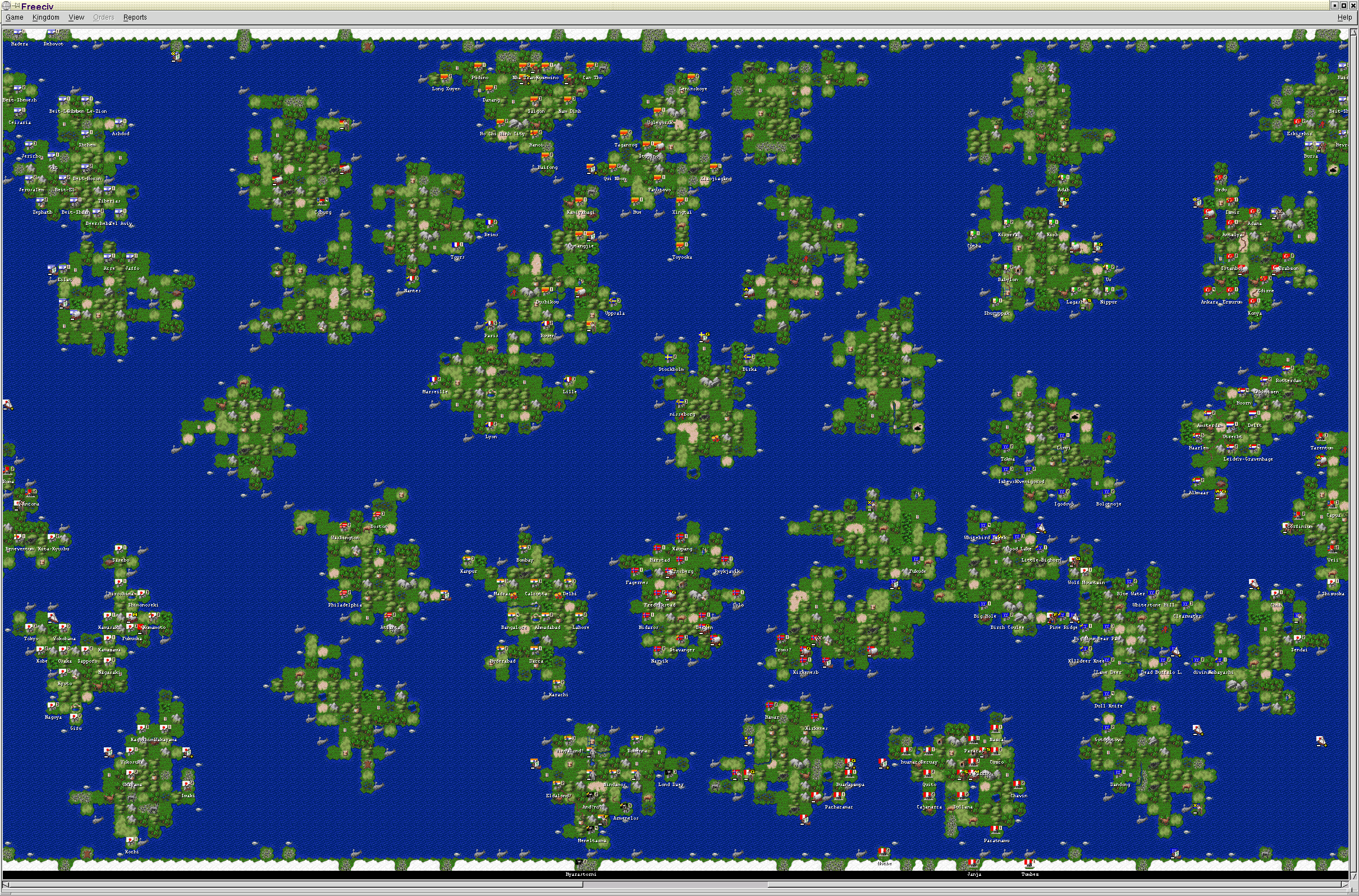
A Freeciv game with full world map revealed (Freeciv version 1.11.5, GTK+ client, tinydent tileset, islands map generator)

For the developers, Freeciv 1.0 was a successful proof of concept, but a rather boring game, so they went back to XPilot. Other players and developers took over; they made the game available on many other operating systems, including Linux, Solaris, Ultrix, AmigaOS, and Microsoft Windows. Linux distributions started to include Freeciv.

The main development goal remained to make a Civilization-like game playable over the Internet, with participants on different continents, even when connected with 14400 bit/s modems. Freeciv achieved this by using an asynchronous client-server protocol: during each turn, human users play concurrently, and their actions are sent to the server for processing without awaiting the results. This kept the game playable with network latency up to a few hundreds of milliseconds.

In 1998, computer players were added; they could soon beat newcomers to the game with ease, using only minor forms of cheating. Computer players are implemented directly in the server; they do not play concurrently with human players, but separately, in between turns.

The game grew in popularity. A public server was installed on which games could be played around the clock; it retained the games and published a post-game analysis webpage with per-player statistics and an animated map replay.

Subsequent 1.x releases improved the GUI, improved the gameplay, optimized playability over poor connections, and added many small features. Over time, the winning strategy proved to be city smallpox, i.e. sprawling the map with many small cities as fast as possible; whoever could develop fastest would win the game, and growing and developing individual cities was not worthwhile.

In practice, from around 2002, experienced players would form teams at the start of the game; a fork of Freeciv included specific features for team play; similar features would later appear in Freeciv 2.x.

Version 2.0, released in 2005, introduced several important changes. New team playing features and advanced diplomacy made cooperative gaming more attractive. Adjustments to various costs and benefits put an end to the dominance of the city smallpox strategy that left many of the game's features unused; developing one's empire now necessitated a careful plan for city development, including the use of trade routes and phases of rapture, in which city populations grow quickly, under relatively peaceful conditions. As a result, multiplayer games were almost always played in teams and typically took longer to finish when compared to 1.x games.

In 2006, TCP and UDP port number 5556 was assigned to Freeciv by IANA. In 2017, after being hosted on Gna! for 15 years, Freeciv moved its source repository to GitHub.

=== Reception and impact ===
In 2000, CNN placed Freeciv among the "Top 10 Linux games for the holidays". In 2005, in an O'Reilly article on "Open Source Mac Gaming", Freeciv was recommended. In 2008, APC named Freeciv among the "Top 5 best (free) open source games". Linux Format selected it as "HotPick" in April 2010 and in October 2014.

Freeciv was described as an example in The Art of Unix Programming by Eric S. Raymond. Studies and courses have used Freeciv as a platform for experimenting with the design and programming of intelligent agents.

== Design ==
Freeciv is very configurable, down to the specific rules, so it can be played in Freeciv (default) mode, Civilization mode, Civilization II mode, or a custom mode. One or several players act as game administrators and can configure the game rules. Typically modified rules are:

- Number of players required before the game can be started. The maximum number of players is 126 in the latest version of Freeciv.
- Speed of technological development
- Whether there should be computer controlled players
- Whether (computer controlled) barbarians should invade player settlements
- How close cities can be built to one another
- How continents and islands are generated and distributed over the map
- The map size, where the maximum map size is 2,048,000 map tiles (128,000 before 2.4.0)
- Map topology (rectangular or hexagonal tiling; whether it wraps horizontally and/or vertically)

In order to play a game of Freeciv, a user must start up a Freeciv client and connect it to a Freeciv server. Initially, the server is in pre-game phase; in this phase, clients can connect and game configuration parameters can be changed. At some point, the server may be ordered to start a game; in response, it creates game players (nations) and the game map, and assigns every player to either a Freeciv client or a computer player, as specified by the configuration. From that point on, the game will run until it ends or is terminated; the server can never get back into pre-game state. The user can also start a game directly from the client: this automatically starts a Freeciv server, connects to it and starts the game.

== Features ==
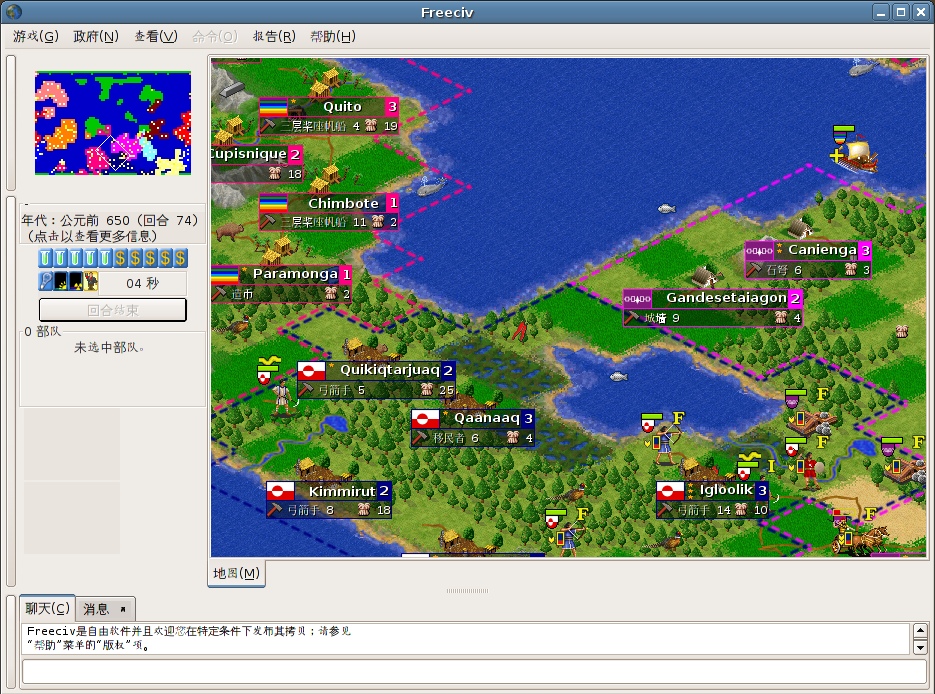
Simplified Chinese in version 2.1

Freeciv's graphics system is configurable: originally, map display was always in overhead mode (like in Civ I). Isometric mode (like in Civ II and III) and optionally hexagonal tiling (like in Civ V and VI) were added later. In both modes, look can be further customized by switching to an alternative set of graphics (called a tileset). The sounds can be replaced as well. Freeciv supports human-to-human multiplayer gameplay and artificial intelligence (AI) computer players. While the game is turn based, human players move simultaneously. The AI players move separately, partly at the start of a turn, partly at the end.

In releases before 2.0, AI players could not engage in diplomatic relationships with human players. Under the current releases, AI players will engage in a very predictable, rules-based diplomacy. Version 2.2.0 included a map editor, termed Civworld. It can create new scenarios, as well as edit the map currently being played. Basic scripting is available with Freeciv, but is not available in Civworld. Version 2.3 increased the limit of players from 30 to 126.

Dawning fanfare

There are different clients available SDL, GTK+ (version3) and Xaw3D A Qt client was added in version 2.5. The Freeciv interface is available in over 30 different languages. The addition of Gaelic was covered on BBC TV.

== Ports and variants ==
Originally developed on IRIX, Freeciv has been ported to many different operating systems: it is distributed with many Linux distributions, offers installers for Microsoft Windows, and has been known to run on Mac OS X, MorphOS, Solaris, Ultrix, QNX, OS/2, Cygwin, AmigaOS, AROS, RISC OS, Maemo, ZETA, SkyOS, various BSDs, and smartphones and tablets running Android.

Between version 2.4 and version 3.1 Mac OS X was not supported, but returned in March of 2023. As of version 2.3, Windows versions older than Windows XP SP3 are no longer supported. Freeciv is available in the PortableApps format.

=== Freeciv21 ===
Freeciv21 is a fork of the original Freeciv project started with the intention of modernizing the code and the client interface, and also adjusting the software more to the needs of multiplayer longturn variant. It was started by enthusiasts within the Longturn.net community. As of January 2023 it is in late developing stage. The first standard Longturn game played on Fc21 software was LT75, started in November 2022.

=== fciv.net ===
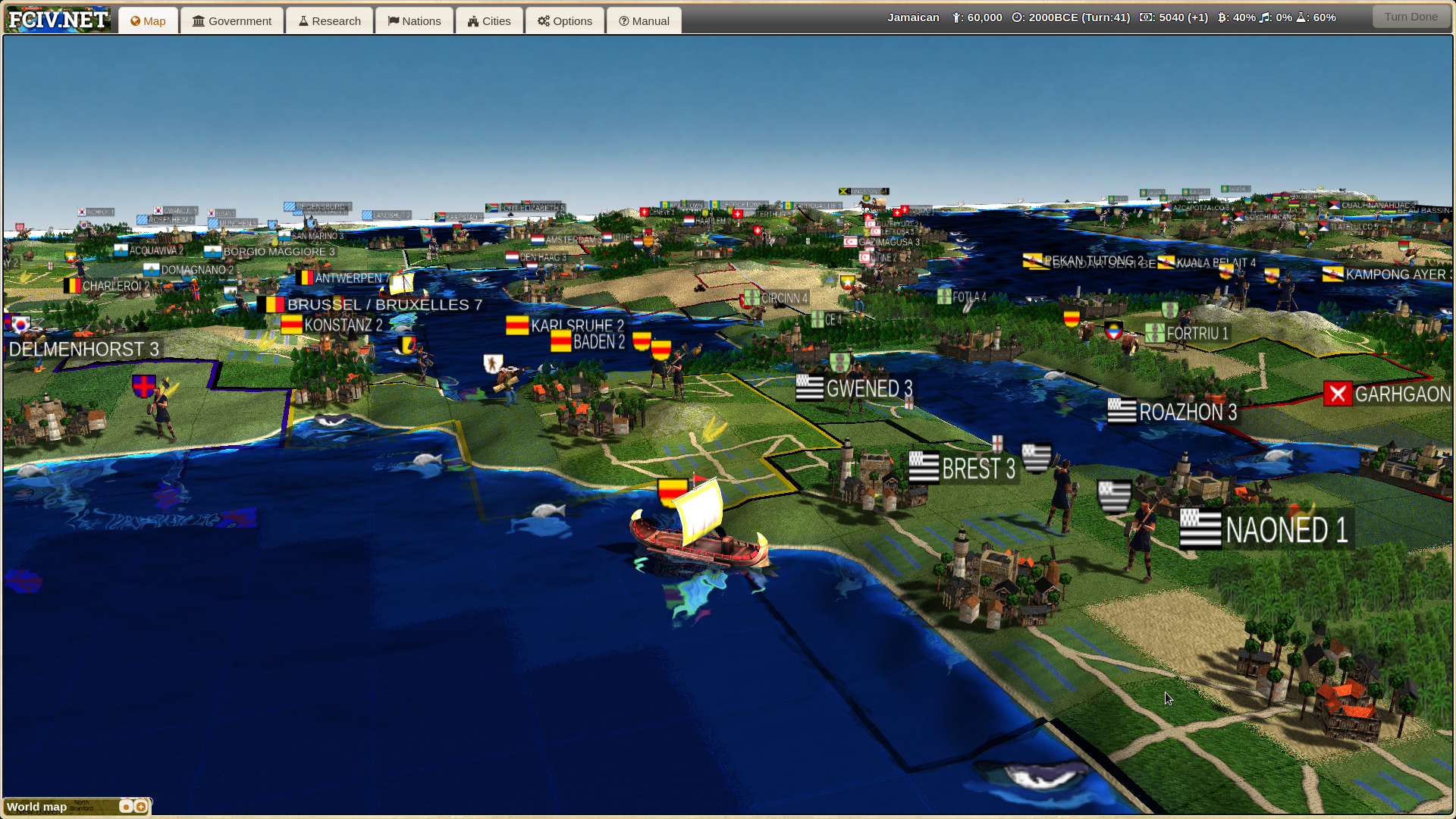
Screenshot of Fciv.net of a trireme unit

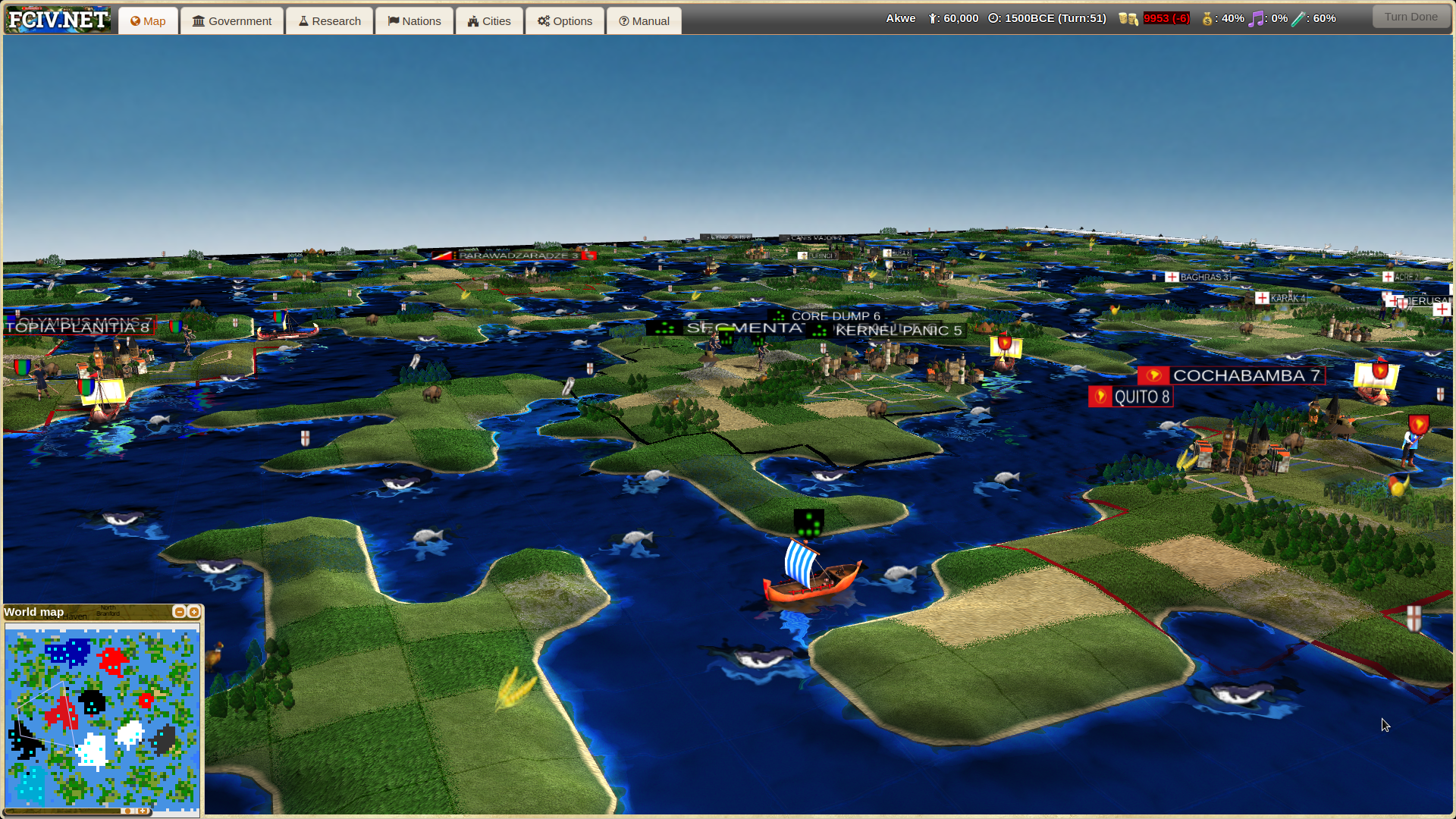
Screenshot of Fciv.net 3D version

Fciv.net was a web-based variant of Freeciv which focused on 3D graphics. It used the Three.js 3D engine. As of July 2026 the site is a landing page for an Indonesian sports betting site.

=== freecivx.net ===
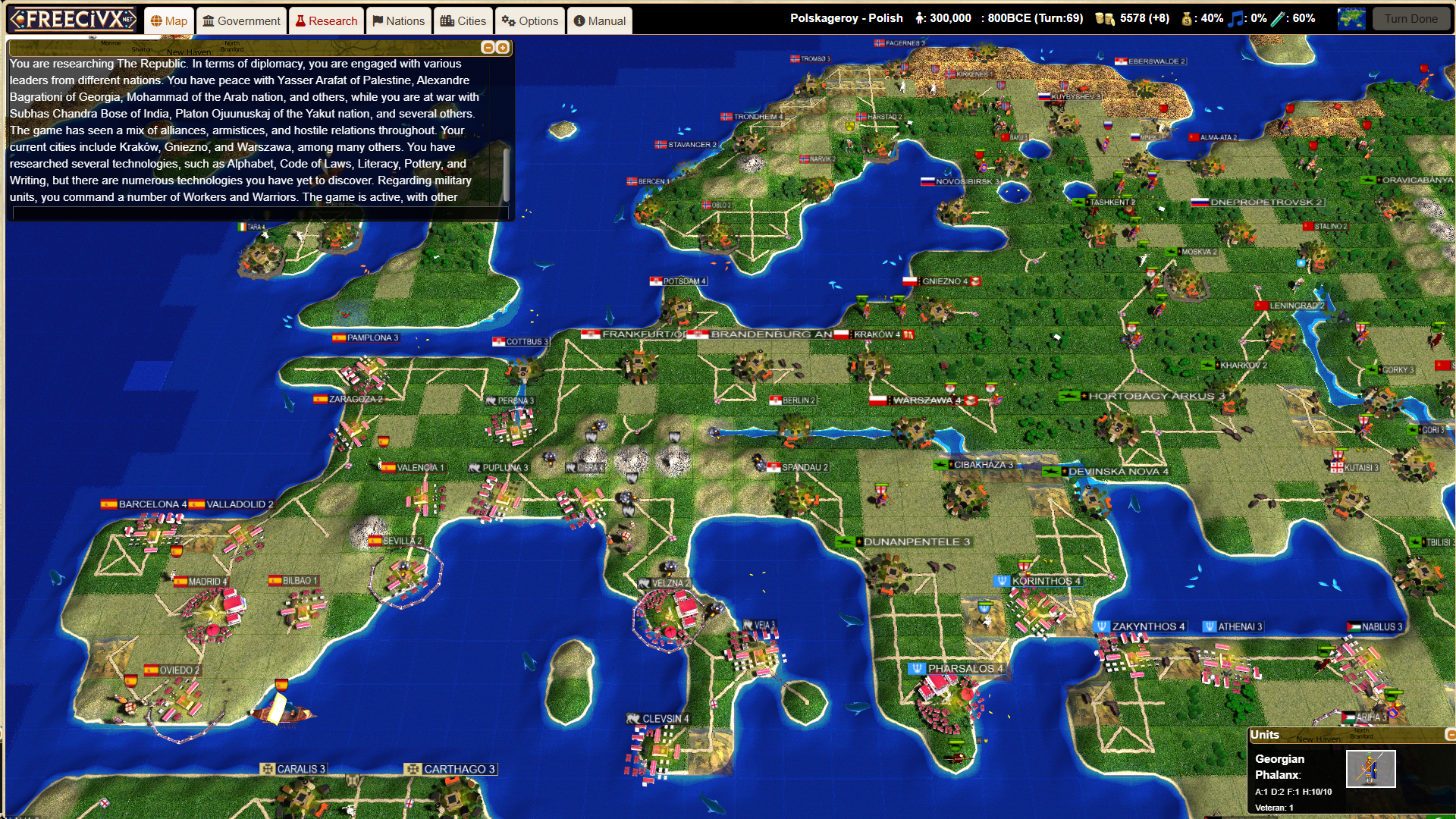
Screenshot of Freecivx.net

Freecivx.net is a free-to-play variant of Freeciv which focuses on 3D graphics. It uses the Three.js 3D engine and OpenAI for AI/LLM chat in-game assistance. Freecivx has a Java client and server in development.

=== Freeciv-web ===
Freeciv-web is a version of Freeciv playable online in any modern web browser. It supports 2D isometric graphics or 3D graphics using WebGL. The game is a fork of the Freeciv project, with the goal of redesigning the desktop game into a version which can be played online. Freeciv-web introduced several new features, such as play-by-email support freely available to anyone online, and support for playing the game on any real-world map location by choosing a map using Mapbox, which is not available in commercial games in the genre. The game's default settings are closest to Civilization II, both in gameplay and graphics (including the units and the isometric grid). The proposal to create a web-version of Freeciv was made 6 April 2007 on the Freeciv mailing lists, and documented on the Freeciv.org wiki. Freeciv-web was originally created by Andreas Røsdal, but is now maintained by several Freeciv developers on GitHub.

Freeciv-web is free and open-source software. The Freeciv C server is released under the GNU General Public License, while the Freeciv-web client is released under the GNU Affero General Public License. Freeciv-web supports human-to-human multiplayer gameplay and artificial intelligence (AI) computer players. Its features are similar to the Freeciv C client, although not all of the user-interface has been ported from the C client yet.

The Freeciv-web server on play.freeciv.org was shut down in March 2018, but the project was revived by a group of volunteers on freecivweb.org. Freeciv-web can be played online at a number of servers such as freecivweb.org. All the features required to play a full game of Freeciv are in place. Most servers offer multiple varieties of the game: single-player, multiplayer free-for-all, play-by-email and longturn.

=== Longturn variants ===
Greatturn Earth World rendering – match GT05

Freeciv Longturn is a specialized large-group-multiplayer-online-strategy variant of Freeciv featuring daylong game turns with large amounts of human opponents per map, allowing for optimal timing to build up strategic plans and readapt them to the circumstances of each turn. Matches can last anytime from a few weeks to months, and commonly involve 20 to 30 players in each one.

Longturn's first game, now called LT0, started around 2004 on the Polish Civilization fanpage civ.org.pl and is now conducted at Longturn.net. It was decided that the game is a bit too slow-paced, so a new "3X movement" ruleset was devised – basically, all units had their movement points and vision radius tripled. As of September 2026, the latest ended game is LT94. Changes to settings or rulesets are discussed in the Longturn forum. and, recently, Longturn Discord server where the community is currently centered. There is ongoing development of a few non-standard rulesets specifically adjusted for longturn multiplayer games, diverging from the rules of the original Civilization which was created as a single-player game.

Greatturn was a similar concept on another server. FreeCivWeb.org also offers longturn games (more than fifty have been played before mid-2021) with a multiplayer ruleset which is documented in great detail.

== See also ==
- List of free and open-source software packages
- List of open-source video games
