= 1830: Railroads & Robber Barons =

1995 video game

- Developer: Simtex
- Publishers: NA: Avalon Hill; EU: U.S. Gold
- Designer: Stephen Barcia
- Programmer: Russ Williams
- Artists: Steven Ray Austin; Jeff Dee; Patrick Owens; George Edward Purdy
- Composer: David Govett
- Platform: MS-DOS
- Release: 1995
- Genre: Turn-based strategy
- Modes: Single-player, multiplayer

1830: Railroads & Robber Barons is a video game developed by Simtex and published by Avalon Hill in 1995 for MS-DOS.

== Gameplay ==
1830: Railroads & Robber Barons is a multiplayer computer game adaptation of the Avalon Hill board game, 1830. With default settings, the game is a very strict implementation of the board game. Starting with a relatively small amount of seed capital, players purchase shares in eight different railroad companies; ownership of a majority of a company's shares makes a player its president, letting them dictate how the company lays track on a map of the northeastern US, builds stations, buys trains, and runs them on routes to generate revenue. The game ends when the players have collectively earned a certain amount of money ("breaking the bank") or when a player or computer opponent goes bankrupt, at which point the player having the highest total of stock valuation plus cash on hand wins. As in the board game, tactics such as looting companies of their assets, using buy/sell patterns to manipulate the stock market, and dumping unprofitable companies on other shareholders are prominent aspects of play.

The game has many options to alter game play, both minor (such as modifying the way trains become obsolete, or providing variable instead of fixed dividends per share) and major (adding a ninth railroad). Some variants, such as allowing random game maps or an unlimited number of the different types of track segment, are unique to the computer version, as they would be difficult to impossible to realize with a physical game.

The game can be played by a single player against one to five computer opponents, or multiplayer with hot seat play. There is no built-in facility for play over network, but modern players have done so by running a hot seat multiplayer game in a virtual desktop. Solo mode has four levels of computer opponent difficulty; at higher levels, the computer opponents collude so as to try to have any one of them defeat the player rather than having each maximize its own position (behavior that would not usually arise in a game among human players).

== Development ==
The game was developed by Simtex, a company based in Austin, Texas.

== Reception ==
Reception

Review scores
Publication	Score
Computer Gaming World	4.5/5
Dragon	3.5/5 (DOS)
Next Generation	2/5
PC Gamer (US)	80%
Pelit	68%
PC Player	55%
PC Joker	27%
Power Play	49%

The game sold less than 40,000 copies, at the time Avalon Hill's computer game sales record, set by Kingmaker.

Computer Gaming World's Bob Proctor wrote, "1830 has made the transition from table to computer very well. If you like pure strategy games, this game will give you hundreds of hours of pleasure." T. Liam McDonald of PC Gamer US praised the game but found it overly limited by its faithfulness to the original board game. He summarized, "Where MicroProse's Tycoon titles are large, sprawling canvases on which to paint an entire empire, 1830: Railroads and Robber Barons is a thumbnail sketch; interesting, but ultimately quite small."

The game was reviewed in 1995 in Dragon #219 by Jay & Dee in the "Eye of the Monitor" column. Jay gave the game 3½ out of 5 stars, while Dee gave the game 4 stars.

Next Generation reviewed the PC version of the game, rating it two stars out of five, and stated that "SimTex created a faithful rendition of the classic boardgame, but it stopped right there. The result is a simulation that feels two-dimensional, at least in comparison to what PC gamers have come to expect."
