= Civilization II =

1996 turn-based strategy video game

- Developer: MicroProse
- Publishers: MicroProse; MacPlay (Mac); Activision (PS1)
- Producer: Jeff Briggs
- Designers: Brian Reynolds; Douglas Kaufman; Jeff Briggs
- Programmers: Brian Reynolds; Jason S. Coleman; Chris Taormino
- Artist: Michael O. Haire
- Writer: Dave Ellis
- Composers: Jeff Briggs; Roland J. Rizzo; Kevin Manthei (Fantastic Worlds)
- Series: Civilization
- Platforms: Windows; Mac OS; PlayStation
- Release: Windows: NA: March 1996; EU: 1996; Mac OS: NA: August 22, 1997; PlayStation: NA: January 4, 1999; EU: April 1, 1999
- Genre: Turn-based strategy
- Modes: Single player, multiplayer

Sid Meier's Civilization II is a turn-based strategy video game in the Civilization series, developed and published by MicroProse. It was released in 1996 for PCs, and later ported to the PlayStation by Activision.

Players build a civilization from a primitive tribe, competing with rival computer- or human (in some editions)-controlled civilizations. They manage cities and units in a quest to assure their civilization's dominance—either by conquering all other civilizations or by manufacturing advanced space technology.

Civilization II was a commercial hit, with sales of around three million units by 2001, and has won numerous awards and placements on "best games of all time" lists. It was followed by Civilization III.

== Gameplay ==
The main game screen and map in Civilization II. Cities are labeled with text. The several units on the map are engineers and a cruiser ship (bottom left). Note the different types of terrain.

As a turn-based strategy game, Civilization II models the historical development of human civilization. A player, when creating a game, may pick one of 21 historical civilizations or a custom-named civilization. The computer will intelligently control multiple rival civilizations. Only a single-player mode was available until the release of the Multiplayer Addon.

The following civilizations appear in the game: Americans, Aztecs, Babylonians, Carthaginians, Celts, Chinese, Egyptians, English, French, Germans, Greeks, Indians, Japanese, Mongols, Persians, Romans, Russians, Sioux, Spaniards, Vikings and Zulus. Barbarians are available as NPCs.

The game takes place on a map made of tiles. A human player may generate a random map based on their specifications, or opt for a pre-made map. Different terrain types, special resources and improvements such as irrigation are present on different tiles. Players begin with one or a few units, including settlers to found their first cities, in 4000 BC. All of the map is unexplored except the starting units' immediate vicinity, and exploration is a top early-game priority.

Cities occupy one tile and harvest yields from nearby tiles: food, trade and production. They may build units, city improvements or wonders of the world. Typically, each civilization will constantly expand by founding new cities until all of the map is settled. Analogous to chess pieces, the many different units vary in their functions, mirroring historical types of soldiers and occupations. Units occupy one tile at a time and may move every turn. Most of them can attack others in battle; a minority have non-military functions.

After civilizations make contact, they begin diplomatic relations. In war, a civilization may conquer another civilization's cities. When all of a player's cities are conquered, they are permanently removed from the game. To end war, two players may promise peaceful relations.

Scientific research is a focal point of the game. Players begin with primitive technology and hence limited possible actions. Grouped by eras from ancient to modern, civilization advances, both scientific and societal, offer numerous advantages.

There are three paths to victory: conquering all other civilizations, building a spaceship that reaches the Alpha Centauri star system using advanced technology, and otherwise surviving until 2020 AD. A player's score is calculated after finishing the game.

=== Other features ===
Civilization II supports mods that customize game graphics or mechanics. "Scenarios" are preset game files that emulate historical, fictional or other situations.

=== Differences from Civilization ===
Civilization II is similar to its predecessor Civilization, with some changes to and additions of units, civilizations, world wonders, tile "specials" and technologies. Entirely new concepts include diplomatic reputation and production waste. The world map was changed from a top-down view to an isometric representation. The artificial intelligence for the human player's opponents was also improved.

== Development ==
Civilization II was designed by Brian Reynolds, Douglas Caspian-Kaufman and Jeff Briggs. Following the success of Civilization, the ongoing development of a sequel was kept secret for years. The game was publicly announced when the team was in the final stage of tweaking and balancing. The game's working title was Civilization 2000. Asked about Sid Meier's involvement in the project, Reynolds replied, "We sat down and brainstormed about it and hashed out ideas, that's about it." Emulating the recently released Doom, Reynolds implemented support for modding despite Meier's fear that customers would blame the company for poor-quality mods.

Meier commented, "Civilization greatly favored the military approach to achieving victory. We've now adjusted the balance to make trade and diplomacy a more integral part of the game".

On the PC Civilization II was developed for Windows 3.1 and later using the WinG API. The later released Civilization II: Multiplayer Gold Edition required Windows 95, and no longer ran on Windows 3.1.

== Release ==
=== Re-release ===
The game was re-released on December 9, 1998 as Civilization II: Multiplayer Gold Edition, which bundled the two prior expansion packs and added options for multi-player games, among other tweaks with the disadvantage that it required Windows 95 and later, while the original Civilization 2 version worked in Windows 3.1. The Multiplayer Gold Edition was included in the Civilization Chronicles box set released in 2006.

=== Expansion sets ===
There were two expansion packs that slowly added more features to the game. The first, Conflicts in Civilization, included 20 new scenarios: 12 created by the makers of the game, and eight "Best of the Net" by fans. It also added an enhanced macro language for scenario scripting with advanced programming features such as variable typing and network features, which was considered widely unnecessary. Due to a programming bug, the Encarta-style Civilopedia was disabled from the game.

The second expansion was Civ II: Fantastic Worlds. (Note: A legal dispute arose following Sid Meier's departure from MicroProse and prevented the use of the full word "civilization" in the North American release. The European version used the full word.) It also added new scenarios that had many unique settings such as one scenario dealing with colonization of Mars, and one scenario called Midgard that had Elven, Goblin, Merman, and other civilizations from fantasy. There are also some scenarios based on other MicroProse games such as X-COM, Master of Orion and Master of Magic "Jr." scenarios. Fantastic Worlds also contains a new scenario editor that allowed users to edit the statistics and icons used for units, city improvements, terrain, and technologies, as well as creating event triggers and other enhancements to the game.

=== Remake ===
The remake Civilization II: Test of Time was released in 1999, following Sid Meier's Alpha Centauri. Test of Time has a new palette and user interface, and new features such as animated units, a playable Alpha Centauri to settle and new campaign modes.

== Reception ==
=== Sales ===
Civilization II placed second on PC Data's monthly computer game sales chart for April 1996. The game secured position 3 for the next four months, before dropping to No. 5 in September. It exited PC Data's top 10 in December, after remaining there for an additional two months. In the United States, Civilization II was the third-best-selling computer game of the first six months of 1996, and the fifth-highest seller of the year as a whole. Worldwide, its sales surpassed 400,000 copies by August, reached 500,000 in September and topped 600,000 by November. In the United States alone, it sold 482,522 units and earned $21.1 million by the end of 1996.

By mid-January 1997, global sales of Civilization II had surpassed 720,000 copies. It finished 20th on PC Data's monthly chart for March, and was the United States' 17th-highest-selling computer game of the year's first half. The game had topped its predecessor's 850,000 sales that August, and continued to sell "over 20,000 units a month" by November, according to Microprose. Civilization II reached 1.2 million units sold by April 1998; Terry Coleman of Computer Gaming World wrote that sales were "still going strong" at that time. In the United Kingdom alone, the game sold 160,000 units by 1999. It also received a "Gold" award from the Verband der Unterhaltungssoftware Deutschland (VUD) in August 1998, for sales of at least 100,000 units across Germany, Austria and Switzerland. Civilization II Gold alone sold 171,495 copies in the United States by September 2000, according to PC Data.

In August 2001, Jeff Briggs of Firaxis estimated that Civilization II had sold "about 3 million" copies. Meier said that he was "wrong on all counts" about opposing mod support; "The strength of the modding community is, instead, the very reason the series survived".

=== Critical reviews ===
Reception

Aggregate scores
Aggregator	Score
GameRankings	93%
Metacritic	94%

Review scores
Publication	Score
AllGame	5/5 (Windows); 4.5/5 (Macintosh); 2.5/5 (PlayStation)
Computer Game Review	91/100
Edge	9/10
Electronic Gaming Monthly	8.75/10 (PS) (Note: In Electronic Gaming Monthly's review, three critics gave Civilization II 9/10, another 8/10.)
Game Informer	7.75/10 (PS)
Génération 4	5/5
Joystick	84% (Note: Joystick scored Civilization II 79% for technique, and 90% for interest.)
Macworld	4/5
Next Generation	5/5 (PC); 5/5 (PS)
Official U.S. PlayStation Magazine	4.5 (PS)
PC Gamer (UK)	96%
PC Gamer (US)	97%
PC Games (US)	A
PC PowerPlay	9/10
PC Zone	90/100

On release, a reviewer for Next Generation ventured that Civilization II "may be one of the most balanced and playable games ever released." He especially praised the added depth of the combat, diplomatic relations, and trade over the original Civilization, which he said was one of the best games ever released for PC. Computer Gaming World gave it the Strategy Game of the Year award, and PC Gamer US named it the overall game of the year, calling it and its predecessor "perhaps the finest strategy games ever made." Civilization II was nominated as Computer Games Strategy Plus's 1996 game of the year, although it lost to Tomb Raider. However, it won the magazine's award for the best turn-based strategy game of the year. It also won a Spotlight Award for Best PC/Mac Game. Macworld's Michael Gowan wrote, "Hard-core strategists will enjoy this game's complexity."

Next Generation reviewed the PlayStation version of the game, rating it five stars out of five, and stated that "Overall, Civ II remains one of strategy gaming's finest hours and is a welcome addition on PlayStation. For those who are willing, it's a game of limitless possibilities."

In 2007, Civilization II was ranked as third in IGN's list of the 100 greatest video games of all time, having previously rated it at number 15 in 2003. In 2012, G4tv ranked it as the 62nd top video game of all time. Polish web portal Wirtualna Polska ranked it as the most addictive game "that stole our childhood". The journal article "Theoretical Frameworks for Analysing Turn-Based Computer Strategy Games" deemed it "significant and influential". In Ted Friedman's essay "Civilization and its Discontents: Simulation, Subjectivity, and Space" from the collection Discovering Discs: Transforming Space and Genre on CD-ROM, he argues that the game "simultaneously denies and de-personalizes the violence in the history of 'exploration, colonization, and development". Computer Shopper deemed it a "worthy successor" to Civilization, and "arguably the finest multiplayer game ever created". In anticipation to the launch of Civilization III, New Straits Times described Civilization II as "the best turn-based empire- building strategy game". Baltimore Afro-American was "obsessed with the game". Tribune Business News deemed it an "old favorite". The game was the fourth bestseller in October 1996 and the 3rd bestseller in December 1997. PC Games argued that the game "cemented the franchise's place in videogame history."

In 1998, PC Gamer declared it the 2nd-best computer game ever released, and the editors called it "intelligent, engrossing and entertaining beyond compare, it's one of the finest artistic achievements of the last decade". In 1996, GamesMaster ranked the game sixth in a list of the top 100 games of all time, writing: "Civ 2 could well be one of the world's most addicting games."

== Legacy ==
Several other games have been heavily inspired by Civilization II. In 2006, an N-Gage version of Civilization was released, based on Civilization II and its successor III. The open-source game Freeciv has a "ruleset" that is virtually identical to II's mechanics.

In 2011, researchers at the MIT Computer Science and Artificial Intelligence Laboratory and the University College London published the results of a machine learning system playing Civilization II, in its Freeciv implementation, which used the text from its official game manual to guide its strategy. The linguistically informed player outperformed its language-unaware counterpart, winning over 78% of games when playing against the built-in AI, a 27% absolute improvement. The same group also showed that their "non-linear Monte-Carlo search wins 80% of games against the handcrafted, built-in AI".

In June 2012, the Reddit user "Lycerius" posted details of his decade-long Civilization II game, since dubbed "The Eternal War". The viral story spread to many blogs and news sites. The game closely mimicked social conditions in the dystopian novel 1984 of George Orwell, with three superpowers engaged in perpetual multiple-front total warfare.
