= Master of Magic =

1994 video game

- Developer: Simtex
- Publisher: MicroProse
- Producer: Douglas Kaufman
- Designer: Steve Barcia
- Programmers: Steve Barcia; Ken Burd; James Cowlishaw
- Artist: Jeff Dee
- Composers: George Sanger; David Govett
- Platforms: MS-DOS, PC-98, PlayStation, Windows
- Release: September 1994: September 1994 (DOS); JP: December 6, 1996 (PC-98); JP: January 17, 1997 (PS1); JP: December 12, 1997 (Windows)
- Genres: 4X, turn-based strategy
- Mode: Single-player

Master of Magic is a single-player, fantasy turn-based 4X strategy game in which the player plays as a wizard attempting to dominate two linked worlds. From a small settlement, the player manages resources, builds cities and armies, and researches spells, growing an empire and fighting the other wizards.

The game was developed by Simtex and published by MicroProse for MS-DOS in 1994. Sometimes described as a fantasy-themed spin-off of classic Civilization or sci-fi themed Master of Orion, it has proven to be quite enduring, becoming a cult classic in its niche of fantasy-themed 4X strategy games. While it never received a direct sequel, a number of other games published since have been described as inspired by it, and reviewers and players remain divided on whether any has succeeded at recapturing the feeling and gameplay of the original.

Master of Magic's early versions had many bugs, and were heavily criticized by reviewers. The last official patch version 1.31, released in March 1995, fixed many of the bugs and implemented updates to the AI. The patched version was received more positively by reviewers. The game was re-released in 2010 with Windows support on GOG.com. Slitherine Ltd. now owns the IP from Atari and has added a DLC, as well as releasing the game on Steam.

== Gameplay ==
Players customize their characters with choices of portraits, spell books, abilities and race.

A world is randomly generated every time the player starts a new game, with the player being able to adjust land size, magic strength, game difficulty and other features. The player can customize the skills, spell choices and appearance of their wizard, choosing one of 14 races for the starting city.

The gameplay starts with units exploring their surroundings, pushing back the strategic map's fog of war. During exploration, the player defeats monsters that are guarding treasure, finds the best locations for new cities, discovers the Towers of Wizardry that link the game's two planes of Arcanus and Myrror and locates the cities of enemy wizards.

Apart from the Player's first city, cities are established by settlers, then upgraded by adding buildings, which in turn improves the economy, availability and strength of units, city's growth rate, mana and economics. Cities produce food, gold and mana. Military units require at least food and often gold upkeep; spellcasters consume mana in combat. While the player is exploring and colonizing new territories, new magical spells are researched. Spells can be used during or outside of combat.

Master of Magic splits spells into six schools of magic: Life Magic, which heals and protects; its antithesis Death Magic, which drains life and creates undead; Chaos Magic, which warps targets and spews destructive energies; Nature Magic, which controls the weather and turns it against the enemy; Sorcery, which manipulates the air and subverts the effects of the other schools; and Arcane Magic, which is a general school and free for all. Players select spellbooks from desired schools, allowing them to research and cast spells from said schools. The number of spells a wizard can learn from each school is dependent on the number of books chosen for that school. The game's five schools of magic were inspired by the collectible card game Magic: The Gathering.

Additionally, the player can select traits in addition to spellbooks. Traits provide special bonuses throughout the game.

There are global spells that affect targets throughout the world. Unit or city enhancement spells can boost the potential of its target, such as increasing the movement and attack speed of units, enabling them to regenerate wounds and increasing the power of their attacks. Wizards can summon creatures related to their schools. The player can research combat spells, which include direct attacks, debuffs and traps. The final spell learned is the Arcane Spell of Mastery, which takes enormous resources to research and cast but instantly wins the game for the casting player.

Unlike strategic phase's top-down perspective, combat takes place in isometric view.

A tactical battle begins when two armies occupy the same square on the global map. The battle takes place in an isometric map that expands the contested square in detail (including fortifications and terrain aspects that affect movement and combat). The two forces are arrayed at opposite edges of the map and the battle is conducted in a series of turns. One side achieves victory by eliminating the other or forcing it to flee the combat; a draw occurs if both sides remain after 50 turns.

The player can recruit 86 unit types from the cities to build their armies. A few (such as swordsmen and archers) are generic, while others (such as troll shamans) feature racial bonuses (such as regeneration or flight) that make them more valuable or more powerful than generic units. Most city-recruited units are unique to the city's region or terrain and have special abilities like magic use, ranged attacks or an ability to always strike first in combat. Mercenaries can seek employment with famous wizards, allowing them to possibly recruit units which their cities are unable to produce. The player can even summon fantastic creatures, such as demon lords or enormous creatures like dragons. The variety of units with unique special abilities offer many options when building an army.

Many distinct heroes are available for players to hire or summon. Heroes have special abilities that boost the efficiency of other military units (like bestowing offensive or defensive bonuses) or allow the hero to perform special attacks, grant them immense strength or toughness, among other abilities.

== Plot and setting ==
An animated slideshow showing the two worlds of Arcanus and Myrror.

Master of Magic takes place across two worlds, Arcanus and Myrror. Arcanus is a land much like the Earth, with climatic zones and varied terrain like forests, oceans, grasslands and deserts. Myrror is a parallel world to Arcanus, featuring heavier magic users and fantastic flora, minerals and fauna not found on Arcanus. The two worlds are physically linked to each other by special portals called Towers of Wizardry, allowing units to travel between worlds.

Magic nodes—which are valuable sources of magical power—are scattered throughout both worlds. The worlds are populated by traditional fantasy races like elves and halflings, plus races which were introduced early to gaming via Simtex's games, like the insectoid Klackons.

== Reception ==
Reception

Review scores
Publication	Score
Next Generation	3/5
PC Magazine	4/4

Next Generation reviewed the PC version of the game, rating it three stars out of five, and stated that "beginner players may have some trouble with the game's high level of complexity and often hard-to-follow instructions, but veterans will be satisfied".

Master of Magic was a nominee for Computer Gaming World's 1994 "Strategy Game of the Year" award, which ultimately went to X-COM: UFO Defense.

Early versions of Master of Magic were riddled with bugs and had a terrible artificial intelligence (AI), frustrating a lot of reviewers with its crashes and ignorant enemies. Despite that, it was announced as the Runner-up Strategy Game of the Year by Strategy Plus magazine, coming in behind its older sibling Master of Orion. A few patches later, version 1.2 corrected a lot of the bugs and added some tweaks, but there were still game-crashing moments. Bill Cranston of GameBytes also savaged other aspects of the game, constantly comparing it against the 1991 hit Civilization.

He said the gameplay was mostly repetitive clickings of the "end turn" button throughout several hundred eventless turns. Other complaints on his list also include Master of Magic's magic not being as crucial to winning the game in a straightforward manner, as compared to Civilization's technology. The potential of racial strife was less than fulfilled as military units of different races can co-exist harmoniously even though subjugated cities of a different race can rise up in rebellion. Coming Soon Magazine! however reviewed the same version and called it a must-have for strategy fans with great gameplay and many spells.

Master of Magic version 1.31 was released in March 1995. It rectified many more bugs and implemented a few changes to the AI. IGN reviewed this version of Master of Magic in 2002 and stated that the ability to customize the player's character, random maps and vast variety of spells and creatures give an immense replayability to the game. The dual planes concept and intense tactical battles spiced with spells, encouraged them to name the latest version of the game as the best fantasy strategy game ever made.

James V. Trunzo reviewed Masters of Magic in White Wolf Inphobia #54 (April, 1995), rating it a 5 out of 5 and stated that "I don't believe that you will tire of MOM. There are simply too many options and too much variety. Even the simple but effective diplomacy segment is enjoyable - and I usually abhor diplomacy. If I had to buy one fantasy game right now, Masters of Magic would be it."

Computer Gaming World called this version fantastic and named it as #141 of their "150 Best Games of All Time". Similarly, IGN placed the game as one of their "Top 25 Games of All Time" in 2000 and "Top 100 Games of All Time" in 2003, praising it for its innovative simultaneous play of two worlds. Tracy Baker wrote in Computer Gaming Classics named it as a strategy game classic for its success in implementing the mechanics of Master of Orion in a fantasy setting.

Master of Magic was inducted into GameSpy's Hall of Fame in 2000, with the network describing it as a visually stunning game with "enduring replayability", due to its randomness and large variety of spells. GameSpy credited the game with being more popular than Master of Orion and responsible for making Steve Barcia and Simtex household names. Computer Gaming World inducted Master of Magic into its Hall of Fame in 2005. The game has been referenced as a representative product of MicroProse in gaming reviews. The writer Alan Emrich, responsible for coining the "4X genre" term, has placed Master of Magic in the top position on his "Games of All Time" list in 2001.

In 2012, a retrospective review of Eurogamer concluded: "It hasn't yet been surpassed by any other fantasy 4X game. Curiously enough, Master of Magic remains the best example of its kind".

== Legacy ==
In 1997, the game was ported to PlayStation with various graphical improvements, retitled Civizard: Majutsu no Keifu (シヴィザード 魔術の系譜). This was a Japan-only release by Asmik (developed by Opera House).

After the closure of developer Simtex in 1997 and the end of official support the game's community took up the support with community patches to fix remaining bugs and unbalances. As of 2020 there is patch v1.52 by the community available.

In 1997, MicroProse released a Master of Magic "Jr." scenario, using the Civilization II engine, as part of the Civ II: Fantastic Worlds expansion for Civilization II. Steve Barcia stated that Master of Magic II would be complete by spring 1998, with new features, spells, monsters and a spell designer included, but Simtex was closed down later that year. MicroProse revealed that it would be developing the sequel on its own, but this plan was canceled when the company's financial situation deteriorated in 2000. Despite the later emergence of games that resemble Master of Magic (such as the Age of Wonders series), reviewers like Kyle Ackerman and GameSpot editor Andrew Park have stated that the game's essence has not yet been re-captured.

Due to Master of Magic's impact on the fantasy "turn-based strategy" genre, the Age of Wonders series, which some considered almost identical in terms of gameplay, has received comparisons in reviews of the latter. However, Lennart Sas, the lead designer for Age of Wonders, argues against this. Other series that have been also compared to Master of Magic, including Dominions series from Illwinter Game Design.

Further prospects of a sequel surfaced with the announcement that companies Quicksilver Software and Stardock had obtained the rights to undertake such a venture. These companies were unable to reach an accord with Atari, who had negotiated complete control of marketing the property. Game Informer reported in 2007 that Stardock aimed to release a remake of Master of Magic in 2009. However, a Stardock employee, Aaron Rister, clarified in the company's own forums that Game Informer was a mistaken reference to a 2010 game Elemental: War of Magic.

In April 2013, Wastelands Interactive launched a successful Kickstarter bid to fund the game Worlds of Magic which is meant as a spiritual successor to Master of Magic, and designer George Edward Purdy who worked on Master of Orion and Master of Magic joined the team. Worlds of Magic officially launched at retail outlets and on Steam according to the gaming news site, Gamasutra on March 19, 2015. Sometimes also known as Worlds of Magic: Planar Conquest, was released for a number other platforms over the next few years, to mixed reviews.

In February 2020, an expansion pack was released as downloadable content titled Master of Magic: Caster of Magic. It started development as a user-made mod.

A remake to Master of Magic by MuHa Games was announced in August 2019 and released under the same title in December 2022. It received generally positive reviews.
